= 1943 Detroit race riot =

Racial violence in Michigan

- Part of civil unrest during World War II
- Detroit police officers defending black people from the white mob
- Date: June 20–22, 1943
- Location: Detroit, Michigan; 42.330°N 83.046°W
- Methods: Rioting, arson, looting, assault, street fighting

Parties
White rioters: White youths; Sailors; European immigrants	Black rioters: Black youths; Black workers	Detroit Police Department United States Army Civilians engaged in self-defense

Casualties
- Deaths: 34
- Injuries: 433
- Arrested: 1,800

A race riot took place in Detroit, Michigan, from the evening of June 20 through to the early morning of June 22, 1943. It occurred in a period of dramatic population increase and social tensions associated with the military buildup of U.S. participation in World War II, as Detroit's automotive industry was converted to the war effort. Existing social tensions and housing shortages were exacerbated by racist feelings about the arrival of nearly 400,000 migrants, both African-American and White Southerners, from the Southeastern United States between 1941 and 1943. The migrants competed for space and jobs against the city's residents as well as against European immigrants and their descendants. The riot escalated after a false rumor spread that a mob of white people had thrown a Black mother and her baby into the Detroit River. Black people looted and destroyed white property as retaliation. White people overran Woodward to Veron where they proceeded to violently attack Black community members and tip over 20 cars that belonged to Black families.

The Detroit riot was one of five that summer; it followed others in Los Angeles; Beaumont, Texas; and Mobile, Alabama, and preceded that of New York City.

The rioting in Detroit began among youths at Belle Isle Park on June 20, 1943; the unrest spread to other areas of the city and was exacerbated by false rumors of racial attacks in both the Black and white communities. It continued until June 22. It was suppressed after 6,000 federal troops were ordered into the city to restore peace. A total of 34 people were killed, 25 of them Black and most at the hands of the white police force, while 433 were wounded (75 percent of them Black), and property valued at $2 million (worth $30.4 million in 2020) was destroyed. Most of the riot took place in the Black area of Paradise Valley, the poorest neighborhood of the city.

At the time, white commissions attributed the cause of the riot to Black people and youths, but the NAACP claimed deeper causes: a shortage of affordable housing, discrimination in employment, lack of minority representation in the police, and white police brutality. A late 20th-century analysis of the rioters showed that the white rioters were younger and often unemployed (characteristics that the riot commissions had falsely attributed to Black people despite evidence to the contrary). If working, the white people often held semi-skilled or skilled positions. White people traveled long distances across the city to join the first stage of the riot near the bridge to Belle Isle Park, and later some traveled in armed groups explicitly to attack the Black neighborhood in Paradise Valley. The Black participants were often older, established city residents, who in many cases had lived in the city for more than a decade. They also looted and destroyed white-owned property in their neighborhood.

== Background ==
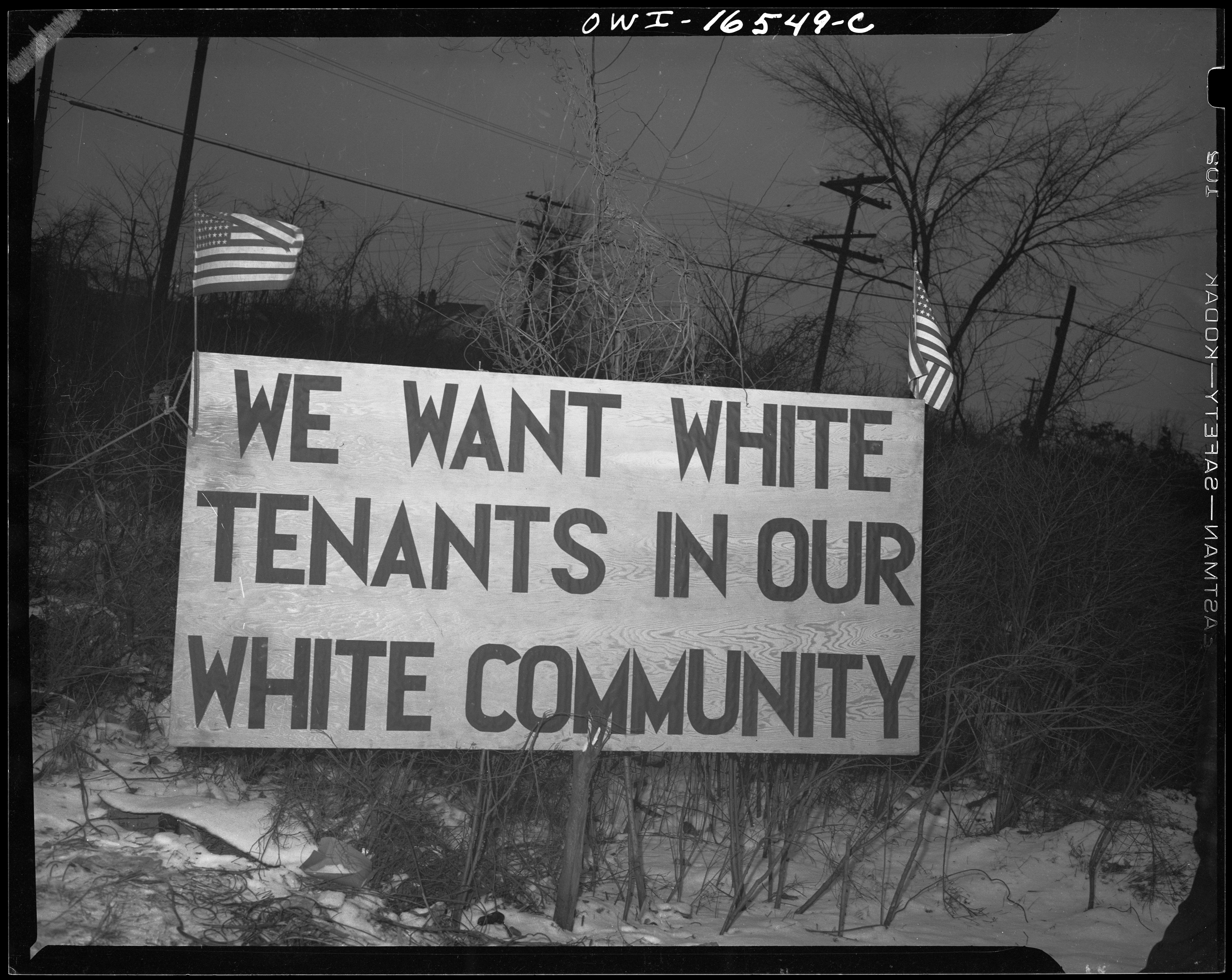
Sign posted in response to proposed Sojourner Truth Housing Project, February 1942. Photograph by Arthur Siegel.

By 1920, Detroit had become the fourth-largest city in the United States, with an industrial and population boom driven by the rapid expansion of the automobile industry. Detroit was unique among northern cities by the 1940s for its exceptionally high percentage of Southern-born residents, both Black and white.

In this era of continuing high immigration from southern and eastern Europe, the Ku Klux Klan (KKK) in the 1920s established a substantial presence in Detroit during its early 20th-century revival. The KKK became concentrated in midwestern cities rather than exclusively in the south. It was primarily anti-Catholic and anti-Jewish in this period, but it also supported white supremacy. The KKK contributed to Detroit's reputation for racial antagonism, and there were violent incidents dating from 1915. Its lesser-known offshoot, Black Legion, was also active in the Detroit area. In 1936 and 1937, some 48 members were convicted of numerous murders and attempted murders, thus ending Black Legion's run. Both organizations stood for white supremacy.

Soon after the U.S. entry into World War II, the automotive industry was converted to military production; high wages were offered, attracting large numbers of workers and their families from outside of Michigan. The new workers found little available housing, and competition among ethnic groups was fierce for both jobs and housing. With Executive Order 8802, President Franklin D. Roosevelt on June 25, 1941, had prohibited racial discrimination in the national defense industry. Roosevelt called upon all groups to support the war effort. The executive order was applied irregularly, and Black people were often excluded from numerous industrial jobs, especially more skilled and supervisory positions.

=== Growing population ===
In 1941, Detroit's Black population numbered nearly 150,000 of the total population of 1,623,452. This total population would reach nearly 2 million by 1943, absorbing more than 400,000 white people and some 50,000 Black migrants, mostly from the American South. This second wave of the African American Great Migration was driven by the economic and political repression across the South exacerbated by the Great Depression and codified in Jim Crow laws respectively. These more recent African American arrivals were driven by de facto segregation and redlining to the already established Black community in the poor and overcrowded east side of the city. A 60-block area east of Woodward Avenue was known as Paradise Valley and had aging and substandard housing.

White American migrants came largely from agricultural areas and especially rural Appalachia, carrying with them southern prejudices. Rumors circulated among ethnic white groups to fear African Americans as competitors for housing and jobs. Indeed, Black residents had to compete for low-level jobs with numerous European immigrants or their descendants, in addition to rural southern white people. Black families were excluded from all of the limited public housing except the Brewster Housing Projects and were exploited by landlords and forced to pay rents two to three times higher than those paid by families in the less densely populated white districts. Like other poor migrants, they were generally limited to the oldest, substandard housing. By the summer of 1943, after the United States had entered World War II, tensions between the white and Black communities in Detroit were escalating; resistance to economic and political repression as well as the oppression and violence of the mostly white Detroit Police Department grew steadily.

=== Great Migration ===
After the Civil War, slavery became illegal. Former slaves and their descendants still faced severe discrimination. As a result, many former slaves could only find low paying work in agriculture or domestic service. Southern Black people migrated north in the 20th century in hopes of leaving the oppressive culture in the South. Many considered Detroit to be the place of paradise, calling Detroit the "New Canaan."

During the Civil War, Detroit was an important stop on the Underground Railroad, as many settled in the northern city or used it as a means to get to Canada. During World War II, it was sought out as a refuge for Black people seeking to escape the lingering effects of the Jim Crow era. The promise of employment and escape from the violent racial tensions in the South drew in many African American workers to the North. Before the war, Black workers in Detroit were scarce: even in 1942, 119 of 197 Detroit manufacturers surveyed did not have any Black employees. However, by 1943, Detroit's labor shortage had become so severe that companies finally began employing African Americans. A report in 1944 showed that with the 44% increase of wartime employment, Black employment increased by 103%.

Ford Motor Company was the leading manufacturer in Black employment: half of all Black people in the auto industry in the U.S. were employed by Ford, and 12% of all Ford workers were Black. Ford made sure to develop close ties with African Americans, being in contact with leading clergy at major Black churches and using ministers as a screening process to obtain recommendations for the best potential workers. This ensured that Ford only employed reliable long-term workers who would be willing to do the most labor-intensive jobs. Around 1910, Ford gave a salary of $5 per day to its workers, which is equivalent to $162 per day in 2023. Because of the city's growth in population and employment opportunities, Detroit became a symbol of cultural rebirth. The statement "when I die, bury me in Detroit" became popular among the Black community for these reasons.

=== World War II and housing shortages ===
The effect of World War II in Europe and Asia was felt heavily in the U.S. even before the attack on Pearl Harbor. The defense industry was growing rapidly because the country was immersed in a military buildup to provide assistance to their European and Asian allies. On the home front, African-Americans were subjected to low-level jobs with little security or protection against the discrimination and prejudice they faced in the work place. A. Philip Randolph and other civil rights leaders took this opportunity to speak with President Roosevelt about expanding opportunities for African-Americans by outlawing discrimination in the defense industry. At first, the president was hesitant to agree because of his political alignments but changed his mind when Randolph threatened a large march on the nation's capital.

After Roosevelt signed Executive Order 8802 which prohibited racial discrimination within the defense industry, he was then preoccupied with providing adequate housing for the new additions to the workforce. Housing in many cities was substandard, especially for people of color. Housing in Detroit was strained as both Black people and white people moved from southern states to Detroit to work in the booming manufacturing industry in the city. African-Americans were unable to buy houses in the suburbs during the majority of the 20th century because of racially biased practices, such as redlining and restrictive covenants. They had no choice but to live in substandard housing in downtown Detroit in an area more commonly known as Black Bottom. Properties in the city had high values for what residents were getting: single-family apartments crowded with multiple families, outstanding maintenance and, in many cases, no indoor plumbing. The influx of African-Americans to Detroit exacerbated racial tensions already present in the city and culminated at the introduction of the Sojourner Truth Housing Project.

==== Sojourner Truth Project ====
In 1941, in an attempt to lessen the severity of the housing crisis, the federal government and the Detroit Housing Commission (DHC) approved the construction of the Sojourner Truth Project with 200 units for Black defense workers. The original location for this housing project was chosen by the DHC to be in the Seven Mile-Fenelon neighborhood in northeast Detroit. They believed that this location would be uncontroversial because of its proximity to an already existing African-American neighborhood. However, this decision was met with immense backlash.

White residents in the surrounding area formed an improvement association, the Seven Mile-Fenelon Improvement Association, and they were soon joined by the residents of the middle-class African American neighborhood, Conant Gardens. These two groups formed an alliance and organized the resistance to the Sojourner Truth Project. These groups protested by meeting with city officials, sending thousands of angry letters to the government and lobbying with their congressmen against the project, among other things. Since the Federal Housing Administration (FHA) refused to insure any mortgage loans in the area after the announcement of the project, many of the residents in the area believed that this project would decrease nearby property values and reduce their ability to build on nearby vacant lots. On the other side, civil rights groups and pro-public housing groups rallied for the federal government to keep its promise to allow Black residents in Sojourner Truth housing and address the housing shortage. There was only one other housing project in the city for African Americans at this time.

In response to the uproar in the local community, the federal government changed its decision on the racial occupancy of the housing project multiple times. In January 1941, the DHC and federal officials declared that Sojourner Truth would have white occupants, but quickly decided instead that it would be occupied by Black war workers just two weeks later. Ultimately, it was decided that the Sojourner Truth project would house Black residents as originally promised, much to the frustration of the local white community.

As the first African-Americans workers and their families attempted to move into their new homes in February 1942, large crowds of both Black supporters and white opponents surrounded the area. A billboard announcing "We Want White Tenants in our White Community" with American flags attached was put up just before the families were to move in. White residents protested the project in the name of "protecting" their neighborhoods and property value. These efforts continued throughout the day as more people attempted to move in and tensions continued to rise. More than a thousand people showed up that day, and fighting erupted between the supporters and opponents. Over a dozen police came onto the scene, but the situation worsened. The fighting resulted in over 40 injured and 220 arrested. Of those arrested, 109 were held for trial, only three of whom were white.

Detroit officials postponed the movement of African-Americans defense workers into the housing project in order to keep the peace. This created a problem for the workers who did not have any place to live. The one other public housing that housed Black people was able to take up some of the residents, but many others had to find housing in other places. After about 2 months protesting had reduced, and Detroit Mayor Edward Jeffries called the Detroit police and Michigan National Guard to escort and protect the African-American workers and their families as they moved into their new homes. The riot led the DHC to establish a new policy mandating racial segregation in all future public housing projects and promised that future housing projects would not "change the racial patterns of a neighborhood." It also established the precedent that white community groups could utilize the threat of violence to their advantage in future housing debates.

=== Assembly line tensions ===
In June 1943, Packard Motor Car Company finally promoted three Black people to work next to white people in the assembly lines, in keeping with the anti-segregation policy required for the defense industry. In response, 25,000 white people walked off the job in a wildcat strike at Packard, effectively slowing down the critical war production. Although white people had long worked with Black people in the same plant, many wanted control of certain jobs and did not want to work right next to Black people. Harold Zeck remembers seeing a group of white women workers coming into the assembly line to convince the white men workers to walk out of work to protest Black women using the white women's bathroom. Zeck remembers one of the women saying "They think their fannies are as good as ours." The protest ended when the men refused to leave work. There was a physical confrontation at Edgewood Park. In this period, racial riots also broke out in Los Angeles, Mobile, Alabama and Beaumont, Texas, mostly over similar job issues at defense shipyard facilities.

== Riot ==
Altercations between youths started on June 20, 1943, on Belle Isle, an island in the Detroit River. In what is considered a communal disorder, youths fought intermittently through the afternoon. The brawl eventually grew into a confrontation between groups of white people and Black people on the long Belle Isle Bridge, crowded with more than 100,000 day trippers returning to the city from the park. From there the riot spread into the city. Sailors joined fights against Black people. The riot escalated in the city after a false rumor spread that a mob of white people had thrown a Black mother and her baby into the Detroit River. Black people looted and destroyed white property as retaliation. White people overran Woodward Avenue to East Vernor Highway, where they proceeded to tip over 20 cars that belonged to Black families. The white people also started to loot stores while rioting.

Historian Marilyn S. Johnson argues that this rumor reflected Black male fears about historical white violence against Black women and children. An equally false rumor that Black people had raped and murdered a white woman on the Belle Isle Bridge swept through white neighborhoods. Angry mobs of white people spilled onto Woodward Avenue near the Roxy Theater around 4 a.m. on June 21, in the actual area of Brush Park beating Black people as they were getting off street cars on their way to work. They also went to the Black neighborhood of Paradise Valley, one of the oldest and poorest neighborhoods in Detroit, attacking Black civilians who were trying to defend their homes. Black people attacked white-owned businesses.

The clashes escalated to the point where mobs of white people and Black people were "assaulting one another, beating innocent motorists, pedestrians and streetcar passengers, burning cars, destroying storefronts and looting businesses." Both sides were said to have encouraged others to join in the riots with false claims that one of "their own" had been attacked unjustly. Black people were outnumbered by a large margin and suffered many more deaths, personal injuries, and property damage.

The riots lasted three days and ended only after Mayor Jeffries and Governor Harry Kelly asked President Roosevelt to intervene. He invoked the Insurrection Act of 1807 and ordered in federal troops. About 6,000 troops imposed a curfew, restored peace and occupied the streets of Detroit. Over the course of three days of rioting, 34 people had been killed; 25 were African Americans, of which 17 were killed by the police (their forces were predominantly white and dominated by ethnic white people); 13 deaths remain unsolved; nine deaths reported were white, and out of the 1,800 arrests made, 85% of them were Black, and 15% were white. Of the approximately 600 persons injured, more than 75% were Black people.

The first casualty was a white civilian who was struck by a taxi. Later, four young white males shot and killed a 58-year-old Black civilian, Mose McKissick, who was sitting at the bus stop. The triggerman, 16-year-old Aldo Trani, later said he shot Kiska since he "wanted to kill myself a Nigger." He and the rest of the group had hunted the city for Black people prior to the murder. Trani was convicted of manslaughter and sentenced to 5.5 years to 15 years in prison. Two other youths were convicted, Armando Mastantuono and Ralph Tancredi. Mastantuono was sentenced to 2.5 years to 15 years in prison, and Tancredi was sentenced to 1.5 years to 15 years in prison. Trani was released from prison after serving 2.5 years due to police misconduct during the investigation against him.

A doctor went to a house call in a Black neighborhood. He then was hit in the back of the head with a rock and beaten to death by Black rioters. A couple years after the riot, a monument was dedicated to this doctor at the streets of East Grand Boulevard and Gratiot Avenue.

== Aftermath ==
Leaders on both sides gave different explanations for the violence, effectively blaming the other side. White city leaders, including the mayor, blamed young Black hoodlums and repeatedly framed the events as being caused by outsiders, people who were unemployed and marginal. Mayor Jeffries said, "Negro hoodlums started it, but the conduct of the police department, by and large, was magnificent." The Wayne County prosecutor believed that leaders of the NAACP were to blame as instigators of the riots. Governor Kelly called together a fact finding commission to investigate and report on the causes of the riot. Its mostly white members blamed Black youths, "unattached, uprooted, and unskilled misfits within an otherwise law-abiding Black community," and regarded the events as an unfortunate incident. They made these judgments without interviewing any of the rioters, basing their conclusions on police reports, which were limited.

Other officials drew similar conclusions, despite discovering and citing facts that disproved their thesis. Dr. Lowell S. Selling of the Recorder's Court Psychiatric Clinic conducted interviews with 100 Black offenders. He found them to be "employed, well-paid, longstanding (of at least 10 years) residents of the city", with some education and a history of being law abiding. He attributed their violence to their southern heritage. This view was repeated in a separate study by Elmer R. Akers and Vernon Fox, sociologist and psychologist, respectively, at the State Prison of Southern Michigan. Although most of the Black men they studied had jobs and had been in Detroit an average of more than 10 years, Akers and Fox characterized them as unskilled and unsettled; they stressed the men's southern heritage as predisposing them to violence. Additionally, a commission was established to determine the cause of the riot, despite the unequal amount of violence toward Black people, the commission blamed the riot on Black people and their community leaders.

Detroit's Black leaders identified numerous other substantive causes, including persistent racial discrimination in jobs and housing, frequent police brutality against Black people and the lack of Black representation on the force, and the daily animosity directed at their people by much of Detroit's white population.

Following the violence, Japanese propaganda officials incorporated the event into its materials that encouraged Black soldiers not to fight for the United States. They distributed a flyer titled "Fight Between Two Races". The Axis powers publicized the riot as a sign of Western decline. Racial segregation in the United States Armed Forces was ongoing, and the response to the riots hurt morale in African-American units—most significantly the 1511th Quartermaster Truck regiment, whose Black enlisted men fought against white officers and military police on June 24 while stationed in England, in the Battle of Bamber Bridge, after the officers and MPs attempted to enforce Jim Crow laws on a pub in the village where locals welcomed the Black GIs.

Walter White, head of the NAACP, noted that there was no rioting at the Packard and Hudson plants, where leaders of the UAW and CIO had been incorporating Black people as part of the rank and file. These changes in the defense industry had been directed by executive order by President Roosevelt and had begun to open opportunities for Black people.

According to The Detroit News:

Future Supreme Court Justice, Thurgood Marshall, then with the NAACP, assailed the city's handling of the riot. He charged that police unfairly targeted black people while turning their backs on white atrocities. He said 85 percent of those arrested were black while white people overturned and burned cars in front of the Roxy Theater with impunity as police watched. "This weak-kneed policy of the police commissioner coupled with the anti-Negro attitude of many members of the force helped to make a riot inevitable."

=== Reinterpretation in 1990 ===
A late 20th-century analysis of the facts collected on the arrested rioters has drawn markedly different conclusions. It notes that the white people who were arrested were younger, generally unemployed, and had traveled long distances from their homes to the Black neighborhood to attack people there. Even in the early stage of the riots near Belle Isle Bridge, white youths traveled in groups to the riot area and carried weapons.

Later in the second stage, white people continued to act in groups and were prepared for action, carrying weapons and traveling miles to attack the Black ghetto along its western side at Woodward Avenue. Black people who were arrested were older, often married and working men, who had lived in the city for 10 years or more. They fought closer to home, mainly acting independently to defend their homes, persons or neighborhood, and sometimes looting or destroying mostly white-owned property there in frustration. Where felonies occurred, white people were more often arrested for use of weapons and Black people for looting or failing to observe the curfew imposed. white people were more often arrested for misdemeanors.

=== Inspiration for non-violence ===
Marshall Rosenberg stated that one of the incidents that motivated him in developing nonviolent communication were the 1943 Detroit riots, which he experienced in his early life at 9 years old.

== Media ==
Radio producer, writer, and director William N. Robson introduced his Peabody Award winning radio drama "An Open Letter on Race Hatred" broadcast on the CBS network on July 24, 1943. The drama is narrated by Jackson Beck, featuring Frank Lovejoy.

Ross Macdonald, then writing under his real name, Kenneth Millar, used Detroit in the wake of this riot as one of the locales in his 1946 novel Trouble Follows Me.

Dominic J. Capeci, Jr. and Martha Wilkerson wrote a book about the Detroit Race Riot, called Layered Violence: The Detroit Rioters of 1943. This book talks about the entire riot. It also talks about how Black people were considered hoodlums and the white people were known as hillbillies. This book also covers the Black people struggle for racial equality in World War II. This also explains the rioters to be the transforming figures of racial violence in the 20th century.

Elaine Latzman Moon gives a brief overview about the riot in her book Untold Tales, Unsung Heroes : An Oral History of Detroit's African American Community, 1918-1967.

== See also ==
- 1967 Detroit riot
- Detroit race riot of 1863
- Harlem riot of 1943
- List of incidents of civil unrest in the United States
