= Eight Mile-Wyoming area =

Neighborhood in Detroit, Michigan, US

Eight Mile-Wyoming Area
- Interactive map of the Eight Mile-Wyoming Area area

General information
- Location: Detroit, Michigan, United States
- Coordinates: 42°26′29.5″N 83°09′52.8″W

Eight Mile-Wyoming area (alternatively known as Eight Mile ) is located nearly 10 miles (16 km) from Paradise Valley on the northern boundary of Detroit and minimally resembles inner-city neighborhoods. Originally settled in the 1920s by thousands of optimistic migrant farmers, the area became a settlement opportunity for Black people to construct and own their own homes. The area was fought over for development and housing projects for decades and represented an isolated concentration of Black people in a vast White population.

== History ==
The Eight Mile-Wyoming area historically represented an empowering area for Black home development and ownership in the 1920s and 1930s. Horace White, a leading Detroit minister and the first Black member of the Detroit Housing Commission (DHC), states it represented an important place of Black settlement "because it was their one opportunity, as they saw it, to own their own homes and rear their families". The dedicated and driven residents constructed homes by scraping together meager resources gathered from junkyards, demolition sites, and occasional purchases for windows and doors. The houses grew as families expanded but the residents were unable to obtain loans and mortgages because of racist legislation and oppressive policies of redlining and blockbusting. However, the residents took pride in their houses and utilized abundant land for gardens of corn and vegetables which subsidized meals for impoverished families. According to a report by the Works Progress Administration and DHC in 1938. Eight Mile residents were among the poorest in the city living in dire conditions. 91.7% lived in single-family detached homes and 2/3 of the homes were owner occupied in contrast to the city's percentage of 37.8%. The Eight Mile community suffered from extremely poor living conditions even though the majority of residents owned homes through land contracts or mortgages. In fact, 2/3 of buildings had substandard conditions, and 45.5% had the minimum of one toilet or bath.

=== Federal Housing Administration influence ===
The battle for reconstruction and development of Eight Mile's land began in the 1930s and 1940s. Eight Mile presented itself as ripe for development because 72% of the 1/2-square-mile (1.3 km^{2}) area was vacant. The vacant land was owned by Black people optimistically planning to construct future homes there or by banks and real estate firms that repossessed the land when poor residents defaulted on high-interest land contracts. The government and state viewed these vacant lots as lost revenue because of unpaid taxes. In order to increase their tax base, the United States Housing Authority (USHA), planned to designate Eight Mile as a place for slum clearance and public housing construction. In the eyes of the Federal Housing Administration (FHA), Eight Mile blight prevented them from subsidizing and insuring the construction of single-family homes in areas of northwest Detroit. In the 1940s, the area around Eight Mile was scattered with housing on a terrain of truck farms and woodlands that the city planned to utilize as future development as populations expanded. West Outer Drive represented a community located 1/4 mile (0.40 km) south of Eight Mile and was populated with newly built spacious middle-class homes. A barrier of undeveloped land and a sand quarry starkly separated the two realities. The neighborhoods of Palmer Woods and Sherwood Forest lay less than a mile east and were populated with enormous two-three story homes, pools and tennis courts. The dire state of Eight Mile prevented the development of middle-class neighborhoods like these because of their proximity to the impoverishment. The FHA refused to fund development projects of all-White subdivisions west of Black neighborhoods because they were designated high-risk areas by appraisers because of their proximity to slums. The construction of the Eight Mile wall, a one-foot-thick (0.30 m), six-foot-high (1.8 m) wall, symbolizing the racist government practices, allowed developers to get loans and mortgage guarantees from the FHA.

=== New Deal ===
Impoverished and oppressed residents of the Eight Mile community desperately lobbied the Franklin Roosevelt administration for housing benefits and utilized their voting power in the New Deal to do so. In the 1930s and 1940s they persistently, but unsuccessfully pleaded the Home Owners' Loan Corporation, a government sponsored corporation created by the New Deal, and the FHA for assistance in improving their homes. The failure of individual actions inspired collective efforts, and in the 1930s two community groups were founded: the Carver Progressive Association and Eight Mile Road Civic Association. Burneice Avery, a 35-year-old schoolteacher, was among the first Black settlers in the community and became an outspoken representative for the Eight Mile Road Civic Association. The community groups worked for FHA funding for single-family detached homes and protested private White redevelopment of their neighborhood. The federal housing policies represented blatant discrimination against Eight Mile residents because in factories they were "working side by side with homeowners who are paying off their mortgages through FHA." Avery drew strong parallels between the government's plan to relocate landowners of Eight Mile and replace them with public housing and the evictions of sharecroppers in the South. However, the dedicated efforts of the Eight Mile Civic Association drew Raymond Foley's attention. Foley, the Michigan director of the FHA, New Deal Democrat and later national director of the FHA under Truman, found the dedicated commitment of Black residents to housing improvement compelling. Although Foley believed that federal housing should create residential stability through homeownership, he embodied a separate but equal philosophy. The FHA already mandated racial homogeneity within housing construction and Foley continued this racist and oppressive practice. Foley visited Eight Mile after a Detroit Common Council sponsored hearing in August 1943 on the development of the community. Community organizers led a clean-up drive on the eve of Foley's visit, resulting in him praising them at a city Plan Commission hearing.

== Citizens Housing and Planning Council ==
Like many other organizations the Citizens Housing and Planning Council (CHPC) developed plans for the Eight Mile-Wyoming area. In 1938 they started their efforts by targeting the residential area with a detailed study of housing conditions in order to facilitate their major redevelopment proposal. In 1939, Marvel Daines, a White graduate student of sociology at the University of Michigan, began surveying the bleakest residences of the community. Daines produced a pamphlet published by the CHPC which was distributed to government officials, planners, and corporate leaders. The pamphlet showcased his interviews of Eight Mile residents about housing, employment opportunity, and living conditions. The report illustrated Daines' astonishment at the forced impoverishment of the residents and their dire conditions while showcasing admiration for their efforts. However, he also highlighted his concern for development of White communities because of their closeness to the slums. Therefore, Daines considered a myriad of proposals to alleviate these issues. He saw the construction of public housing unlikely because of the government's strong desire to clear Eight Mile as slums. He believed that a private-public project would effectively exacerbate rents and evict poor residents. Daines settled, in the CHPC report, on a proposal he saw as "seemed feasible from both the point of view of the Negro and his more fortunate white neighborhor in the adjacent areas." The proposal asserted that the land of existing Black neighborhoods should be sold to White buyers who would develop and maintain the land at levels suitable for middle-class White homeowners. The CHPC proposed a new community "in a comparable area ... close to an industrial center of employment ... where Negros have already settled, and garden space is available" would then be built. This effectively represented a government-subsidized expansion of Black ghettos while designating Eight Mile for White settlement.

=== City of Detroit's plan ===
The city of Detroit also had plans for the redevelopment of Eight Mile. In 1941 the Mayor's Airport Committee sought its vacant lots as space for a new airport. Because the area was inhabited by impoverished African Americans, the committee foresaw little objection and saw the commercial development as possible increases in tax money. However, in 1942 they considered sites on Detroit's East Side, because of its proximity to the industrial belt, or undeveloped suburban area, because of its cheap land. In 1954 they reconsidered Eight Mile, but staunch opposition from community groups and middle-class developers shut down the proposal.

== Detroit's City Plan Commission ==
Detroit's City Plan Commission (CPC) also proposed redevelopment of the Eight Mile community. The CPC believed in coupling public housing projects with strictly regulated private development. In 1940, the CPC administration enacted Detroit's first zoning law which would guide city growth. The CPC planned to reconstruct the blighted neighborhoods of Detroit through modern planned communities, and strongly opposed allowing Black residents or private developers to dictate Eight Mile development. Instead, they believed in temporary housing for war workers or movement of impoverished black residents, as the CHPC report suggested, in order to prevent slum expansion. In 1942, a "Blight Committee" sent by the CPC, studied the public and private housing of Eight Mile and suggested, previously in 1941, that the city should condemn the land and sell it to private developers. The CPC supported the adoption of a public-private partnership plan for Eight Mile because city officials, like Detroit Mayor Jeffries, viewed public housing as preventative of private housing growth. Furthermore, the slow pace of construction, large manpower necessary for World War II (which was ongoing at the time), and material shortage created an influx of thousands of new workers. Therefore, in 1942, the Federal Public Housing Authority and DHC proposed 1,500 units of temporary warehousing for Black workers in vacant Eight Mile land. The city saw this construction as uncontroversial because the racial homogeneity of Eight Mile's already Black community would not be changed by an influx of Black workers.

== Individual contractors ==
Individual contractors viewed the Eight Mile community as an opportunity to greatly increase profits by attaining "scavenger lots"—land held by the city or state because of nonpayment of taxes. In 1943, M.M. Robinson and Nash Russ, a Black developer, petitioned the CPC to grant access to property controlled by the state on which they promised to repair dilapidated housing and continue development through subsidies from the FHA. A hearing for this petition was later held in September 1943. The Eight Mile Civic Association created a private development group that incorporated under Urban Development Corporate Law in a maneuver to garner city approval. The Wayne County Better Homes, led by black businessman and politician Charles Diggs, proposing community focused development. In March 1944, a hearing for the sale of 850 tax delinquent parcels heard testimony from three members of Eight Mile Road Civic Association, State Senator Charles Diggs, two representatives from the United Automobile Workers (UAW), Local 600, and Raymond Foley — who praised Eight Mile residents' efforts and initiatives. The support for public housing in Eight Mile was headed by Black community members who joined the CPC, CHPC, and the UAW and Local 600 who pressured city and federal officers to eradicate the housing shortages for Black wartime southerners. The director of Congress of Industrial Organizations' International Housing Department, William Nicholas, proposed 2,500 public housing units. Horace White, a leading Detroit minister and mediator in the Sojourner Truth project, advocated through Black newspapers for development of the area. He believed that residents would be "pawns in the fight between private builders and public housing people" if private developers could profit off of FHA loans. The construction of six hundred units of temporary housing, backed by the FHA and designated the Robert Brooks Homes, along with FHA subsided single-family homes, represented a compromise. Although the Eight Mile community changed FHA policy, the discriminatory practices of the FHA remained intact.

In the 1940s and 1950s, 500 single-family homes were built in the area and the Black population were able to traverse the racial divide. In 1960, 88% of the homes in the area were occupied.
