= McGuirk Arena =

Multi-purpose arena in Mount Pleasant, Michigan

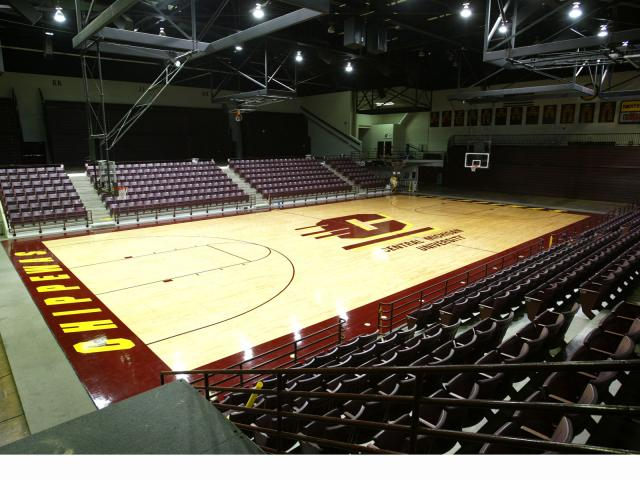
- Interior in 2007
- Interactive map of McGuirk Arena
- Former names: Ryan Hall; Daniel P. Rose Center (until 2010)
- Location: Mount Pleasant, Michigan
- Coordinates: 43.580888°N 84.773941°W
- Owner: Central Michigan University
- Capacity: 5,200 (1973–2009); 5,300 (2010–present)
- Record attendance: 5,425 (January 28, 2023 vs. Western Michigan)

Construction
- Opened: 1973
- Renovated: 2009–10
- Cost: $22.5 million (2010 renovation)

Tenants
- Central Michigan Chippewas (NCAA); Men's basketball Women's basketball Women's gymnastics Women's volleyball Wrestling

McGuirk Arena, previously known as the Daniel P. Rose Center and Rose Arena, is a multi-purpose arena, in Mount Pleasant, Michigan, United States. The arena opened in 1973 and is part of a larger facility known as the CMU Events Center. The arena is home to the Central Michigan University Chippewas men's and women's basketball, women's gymnastics, women's volleyball, and men's wrestling teams.

== Amenities ==
The facility features a pair of club rooms, the largest of which is a 1,600-square-foot (150 m^{2}) space with room for 130 Chippewa fans and plush leather-chair seating for 88. It also features a 360-square-foot (33 m^{2}) outdoor patio and is available for receptions, meetings and banquet

== History ==
Ryan Hall/Rose Arena took over as the main hub for Central Michigan's indoor athletic events in 1973 in part of the project to move the athletic events to the south end of campus. Prior to its opening, the main gymnasium was Finch Fieldhouse, itself built in 1951 on South Franklin Street to replace the original Central Hall on Warriner Mall. Previous seating capacity was 5,200.

=== Toilet Paper tradition ===
Prior to 1988, fans would throw toilet paper after a CMU men's basketball player made the first basket. It was estimated that 3,000 rolls were used each game, causing a shortage. Fans would even steal paper from the bathrooms. The Mid-American Conference began assessing technical fouls in 1988 for stopping play and putting the players at risk, thus ending the tradition.

The tradition returned during the 2022-23 season, though the ceremonial toss was shifted to pregame. The modern Toilet Paper Toss encouraged the new attendance record for the facility, hosting arch-rival Western Michigan on January 28, 2023. The Chippewas overcame an 11-point deficit to log a game-winning three-pointer with 6.6 seconds to go for a 70-69 final.

=== Renovation ===
In 2009–2010, the CMU Events Center underwent a $20 million renovation that included reconfigured seating in the arena, increasing seating capacity to 5,300 from the previous capacity of 5,200. The Daniel P. Rose Center became McGuirk Arena with the court named after donor and former trustee John G. Kulhavi.

== Mascot ==
Rowdie was introduced as the arena's official mascot after the men's basketball team made a trip to the NCAA Men's Basketball tournament in 2003. Rowdie, named after the "Rose Rowdies" student section at that time, has since hosted numerous events supporting various causes. In 2008 Rowdie hosted a basketball game featuring mascots from around Mid-Michigan including Sparty from Michigan State.

== Attendance Records ==
Highest attendance at McGuirk Arena*
Rank	Attendance	Date	Game result
1	5,425	Jan. 28, 2023	CMU 70, WMU 69
T2	5,412	Feb. 3, 2017	CMU 86, WMU 82
T2	5,412	Feb. 18, 2017	Ball State 109, CMU 100, OT
3	5,361	Jan. 25, 2025	CMU 73, WMU 52
4	5,352	Jan. 31, 2026	CMU 62, Bowling Green 59
5	5,350	Dec. 1, 2010	Temple 65, CMU 53
6	5,032	Feb. 17, 2024	CMU 69, WMU 42

*does not include attendance records from Rose Arena prior to renovations

== Notable athletes ==
=== Retired numbers ===
- Dan Majerle #44 (men's basketball)
- Sue Nissen #22 (women's basketball)
- Dan Roundfield #32 (men's basketball)
- James McElroy #14 (men's basketball)
- Mel McLaughlin #14 (men's basketball)
- Ben Poquette #50 (men's basketball)

=== NBA/ABA players ===
- Nate Huffman
- Willie Iverson
- Chris Kaman
- Ben Kelso
- Dan Majerle
- Jim McElroy
- Ben Poquette
- Dan Roundfield

== See also ==
- List of NCAA Division I basketball arenas
