= Krainz Woods =

Neighborhood in Detroit, Michigan, United States

Coordinates: 42.4297°N 83.0542°W

Krainz Woods (colloquially known as Krainz and Krainz Park) is a neighborhood in Detroit, Michigan.

The neighborhood was named after Captain John Krainz Jr., a World War II hero from Detroit. The neighborhood was once home to Malcolm X, who lived on Keystone Street in the 1950s, and Spencer Haywood in the 1960s. The Sojourner Truth housing project is located there. Many Motown singing groups, such as The Dramatics and The Floaters, were from the Sojourner Truth housing projects. In 2009, Mayor of Detroit Dave Bing led a ribbon-cutting dedication of Krainz Park.

== History ==
Originally, Krainz Woods was a deeply wooded area located west of the Village of Norris. It later became a part of Hamtramck Township, and the City of Detroit annexed the area in 1916. Between 1923 and 1940, about 1,000 houses were constructed in Krainz Woods. In 1966 the Krainz Woods Neighborhood Organization was mostly White. During that year, the organization posted an advertisement in an African-American newspaper that asked Conant Gardens residents to go to a meeting at an area church to protest a proposed scattered-site housing and open occupancy. The whites in Krainz Woods wanted to recruit middle class blacks in Conant Gardens to oppose public housing.

Ten prisoners escaped from the Ryan Correctional Facility on August 21, 1994. Nine prisoners were recaptured and, according to authorities, one died of a drug overdose. On Monday August 29, 1994 a group of about 500 area residents held a meeting in the W.L. Bonner Cultural Center about the prison, and the residents decided that they needed to have the prison closed. The residents said that, prior to the prison's construction, the state had said that "harden" and "violent" criminals would not be held in that facility. On November 5, 1994, about sixteen members of the Krainz Woods Neighborhood Organization, including at least eight elderly people, demonstrated in front of the Ryan Correctional Facility, saying that the state did not implement promised measures, improving neighborhood lighting, hiring employees from the neighborhood, and implementing a grant to pay for security doors on the houses of the residents.

== Cityscape ==
The Krainz Woods Neighborhood Organization serves a 17-city block area, east of Conant Gardens, and adjacent to the Detroit Reentry Center (formerly the Ryan Correctional Facility), and the Mound Correctional Facility. The community is bounded by Ryan Road, Mound Road, Nevada, and 7 Mile Road East. Due to its proximity to Conant Gardens, Krainz Woods is often mistaken for, and erroneously considered as part of, that neighboring community.

The Krainz Woods business community consists of The Bay at Cranbrook Health and Rehabilitation Center, three party stores (F&S Market, Moore Market and Piper Liquors), and two restaurants (Nevada Coney Island, and 7's Deli).

== Education ==
Residents are zoned to Detroit Public Schools. Mason Elementary-Middle School serves K-8. Pershing High School serves 9–12.

The National Heritage Academies Legacy Charter Academy, located in the former Atkinson Elementary School, is in Krainz Woods.

Previously Atkinson Elementary School in Krainz Woods served the community as the zoned elementary school. At one time Van Zile Elementary School served the community. Previously Farwell Middle School served the community.
