= Drey Ricks =

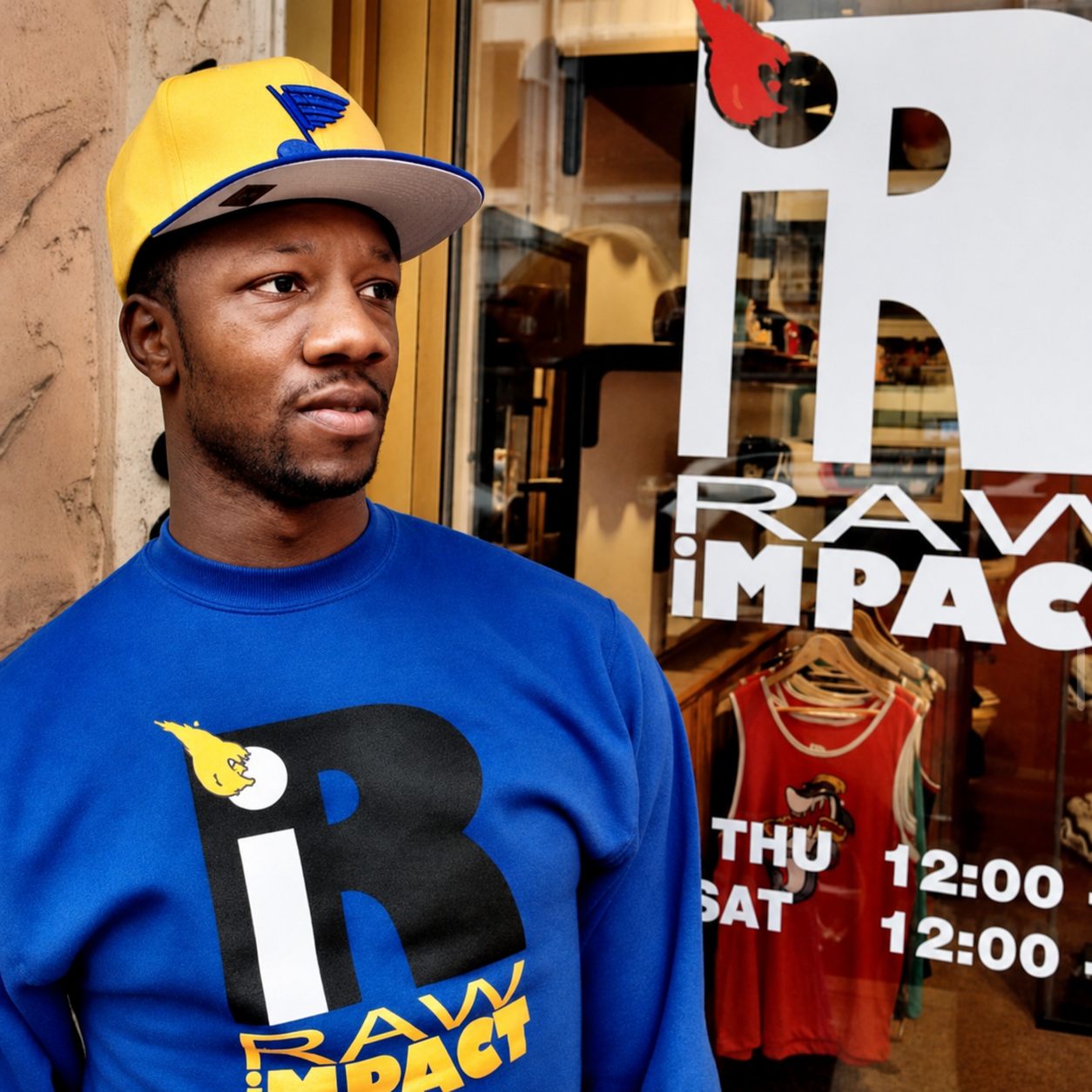
- Born: September 12, 1986 (age 40); Detroit, Michigan, U.S.
- Occupations: CEO & Founder of Rawimpact Lifestyle Brand
- Years active: 2005–present
- Sports commentary career
- Genres: Color Commentary, Performance Analysis
- Sport: Basketball
- Basketball career

Western Michigan University
- Position: Point guard

Career information
- College: Western Michigan University
- Number: 12

Drey Ricks (born September 12, 1986) is the CEO & Founder of Rawimpact Lifestyle Brand. Rawimpact Lifestyle Brand gained prominent recognition in the sports, hip-hop and streetwear culture association with various artists and athletes within mainstream sports and entertainment circles.

== Early life ==
Drey Ricks was born in Detroit, Michigan. Ricks is from a boxing family; His uncles, Jimmy Paul and Thomas "Hitman" Hearns, and his father, Danny Paul, were boxers. Ricks spent much of his adolescence inside the legendary Kronk Boxing Gym in Detroit. Ricks played basketball at Pershing High School in Detroit and was named Third Team All-State in 2005 and earned a basketball scholarship to Western Michigan University.

== College career ==
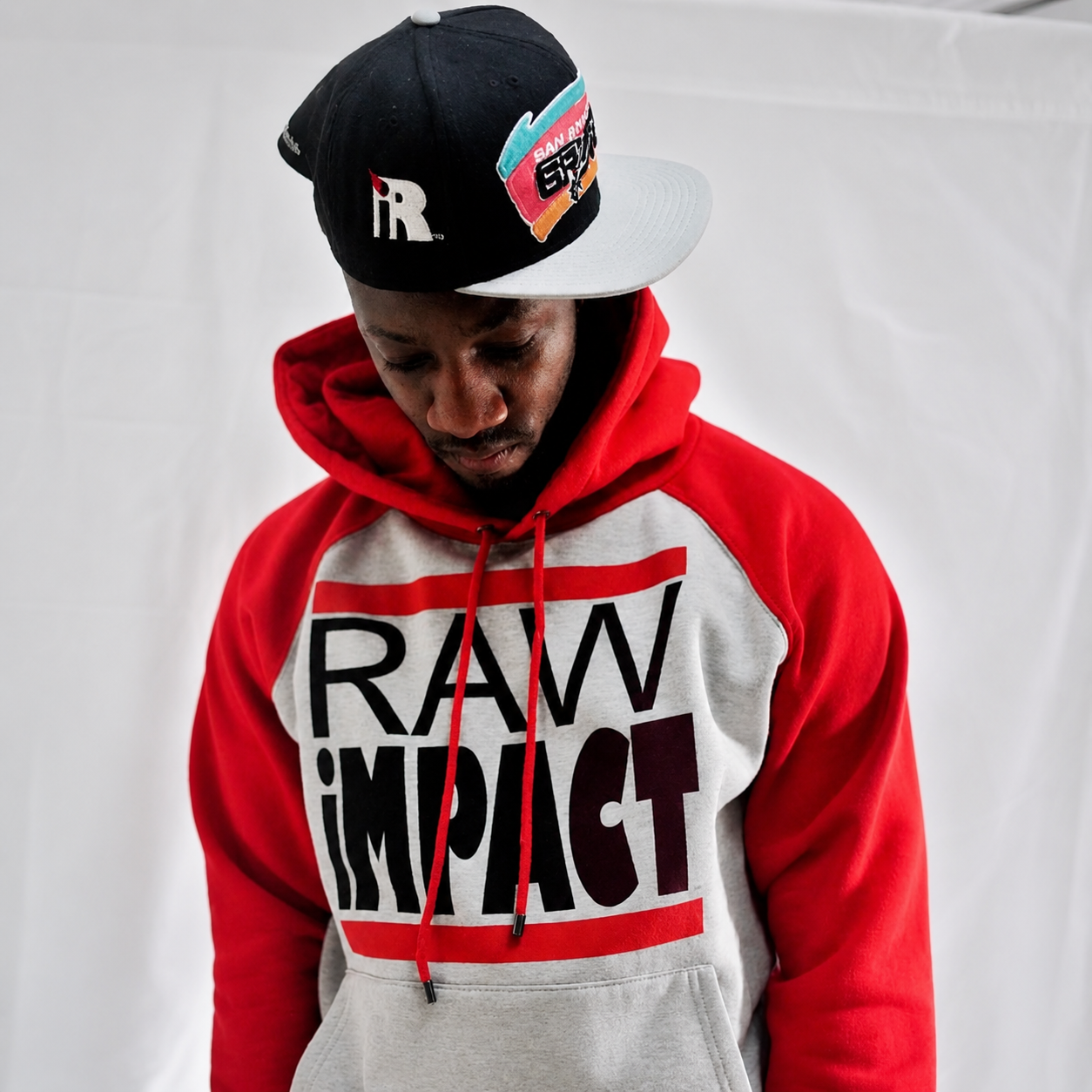
Drey Ricks CEO & Founder of Rawimpact Lifestyle Brand

Ricks played basketball at Western Michigan University from 2005 to 2009. His best game came in the 2006-2007 season against the San Diego State Aztecs where he scored 29 points, earning him MAC West Player of the Week and CollegeInsider.com Mid-Major Player of the Week. That season, he ranked fifth in the MAC in three-point shooting. Over his first three years, he earned three letters.

Ricks career was cut short due to a torn ligament in his left wrist during summer team workouts that caused him to sit out and miss numerous games during the 2008–2009 season. Ricks graduated from Western Michigan University in 2009 with a bachelor's degree in criminal justice.

== Post-playing career ==
After graduating from Western Michigan, Ricks started the clothing brand Rawimpact with a storefront in downtown Kalamazoo, Michigan. He also began managing several athletes including Wilson Chandler and Louis Delmas.
