= Rawimpact Lifestyle Brand =

American sportswear brand

Rawimpact Lifestyle Brand ©
- Industry: Clothing Industry
- Founded: September 12, 2010
- Founder: Drey Ricks
- Headquarters: Kalamazoo, Michigan
- Products: Sportswear; Clothing; Accessories; Skateboards
- Website: shoprawimpact.com

Rawimpact Lifestyle Brand is an American sportswear and lifestyle brand founded in 2010 by Drey Ricks. It includes streetwear apparel, snapback hats, skateboards, backpacks and accessories.

== History ==
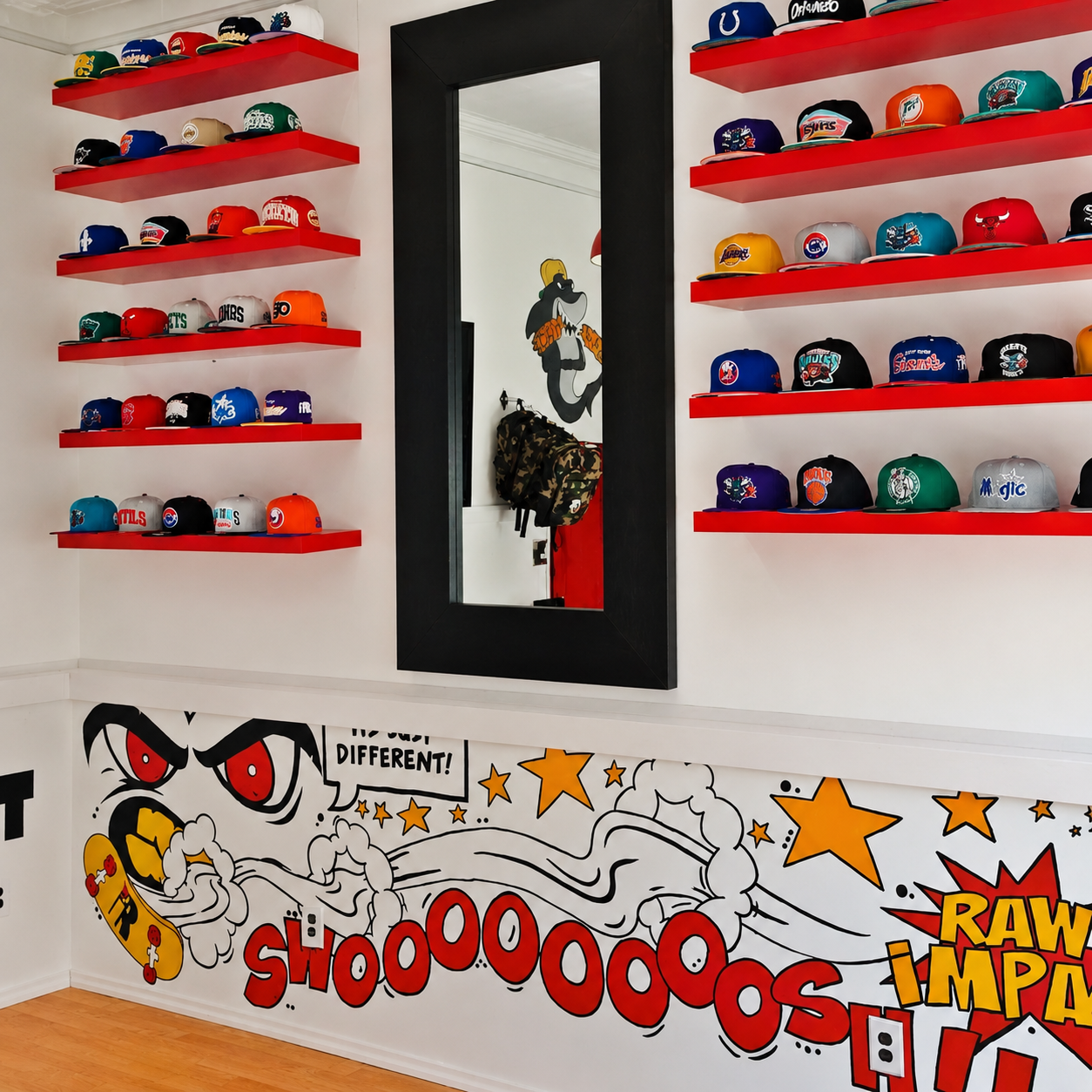
The initial products were a collection snapback hats and crewneck sweatshirts sold in Kalamazoo, Michigan at the brands flagship brick-and-mortar retail store. The grand opening included autograph signing from boxing legend Thomas 'Hitman' Hearns.

Rawimpact was awarded 'New Business' of The Year by the Kalamazoo, Gazette and Western Herald in March 2011.

In 2013, the second retail location was opened in Sterling Heights, Michigan. The brand expanded to include skateboard, backpacks and accessories to its catalogue.

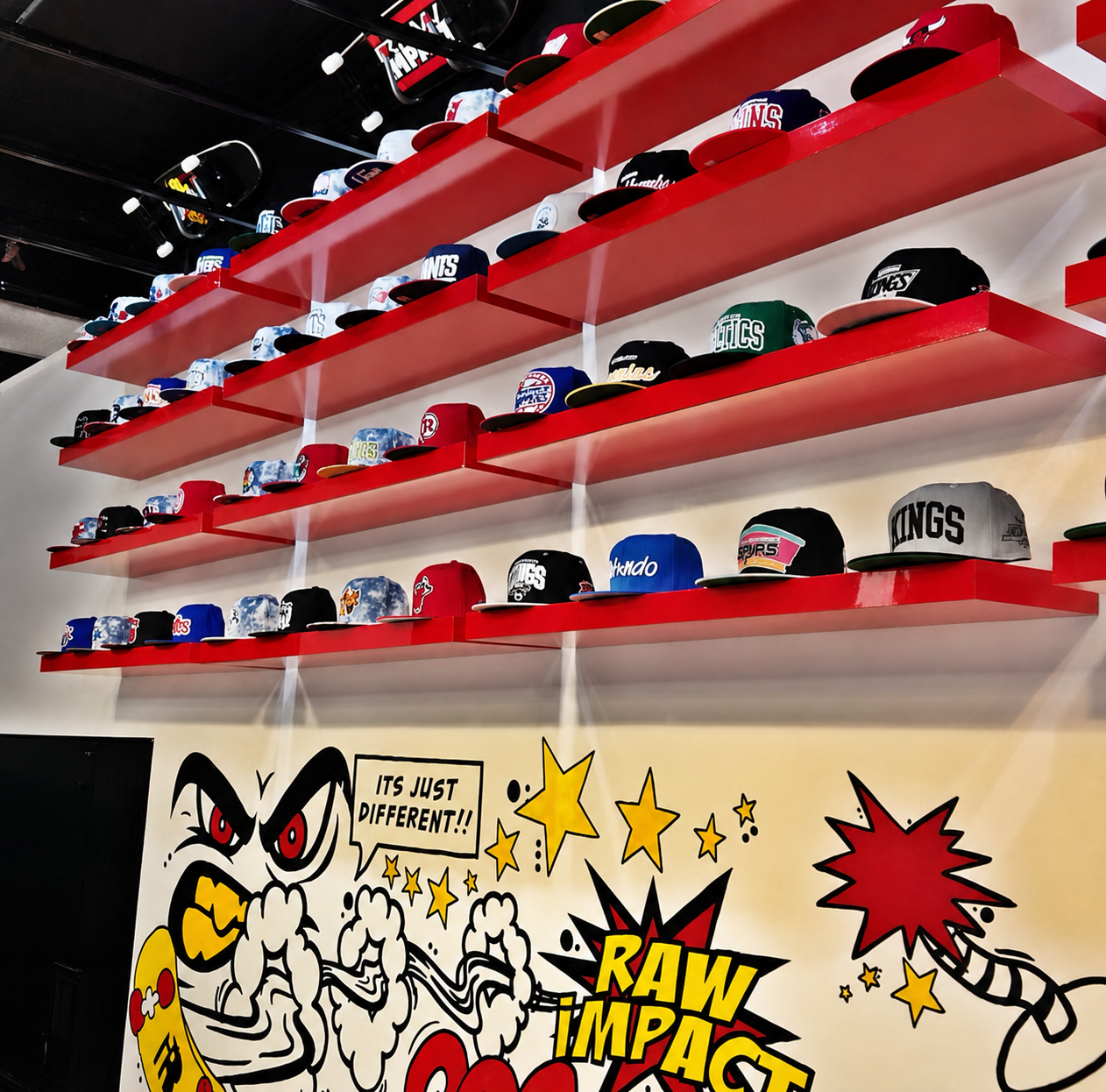
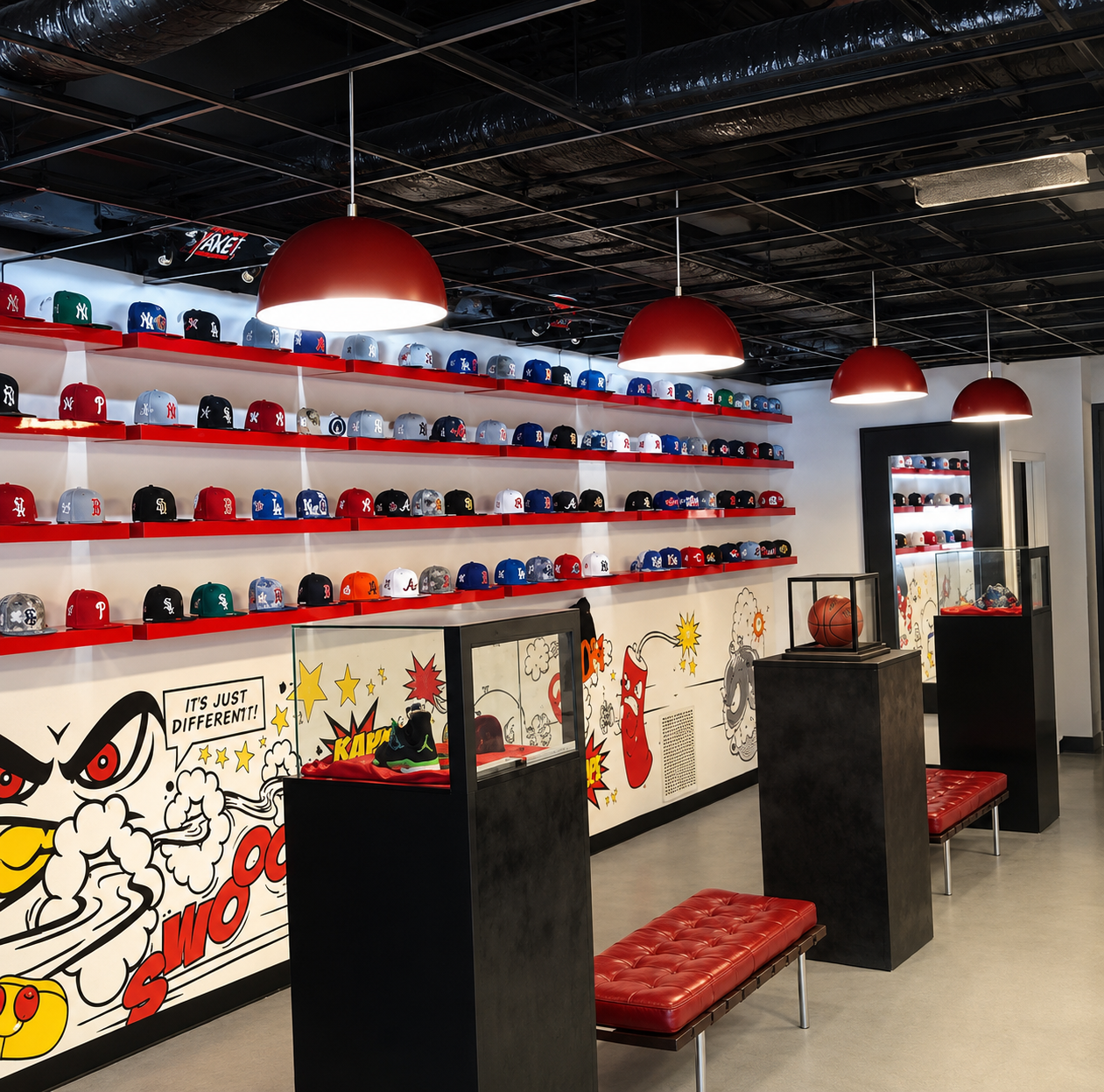
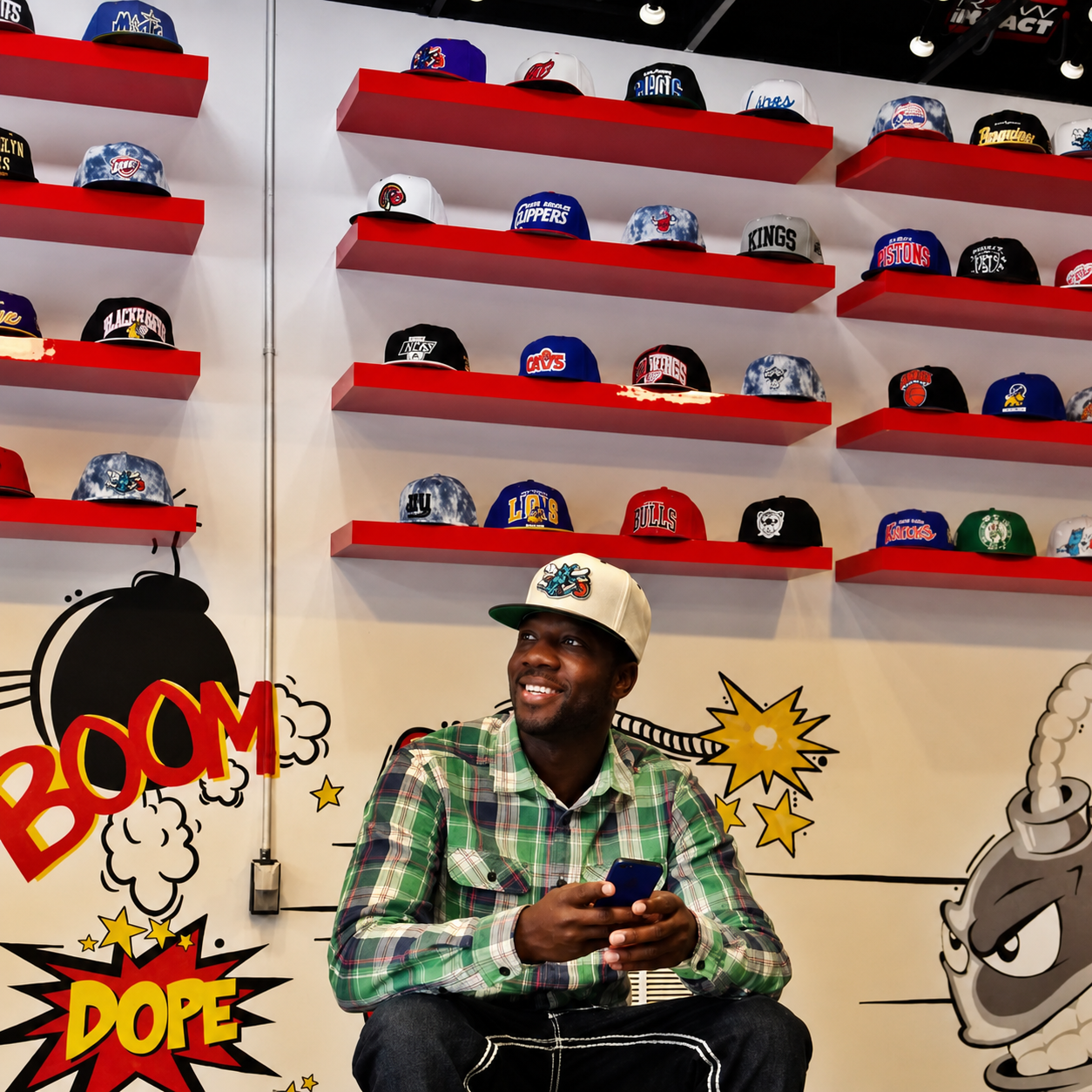
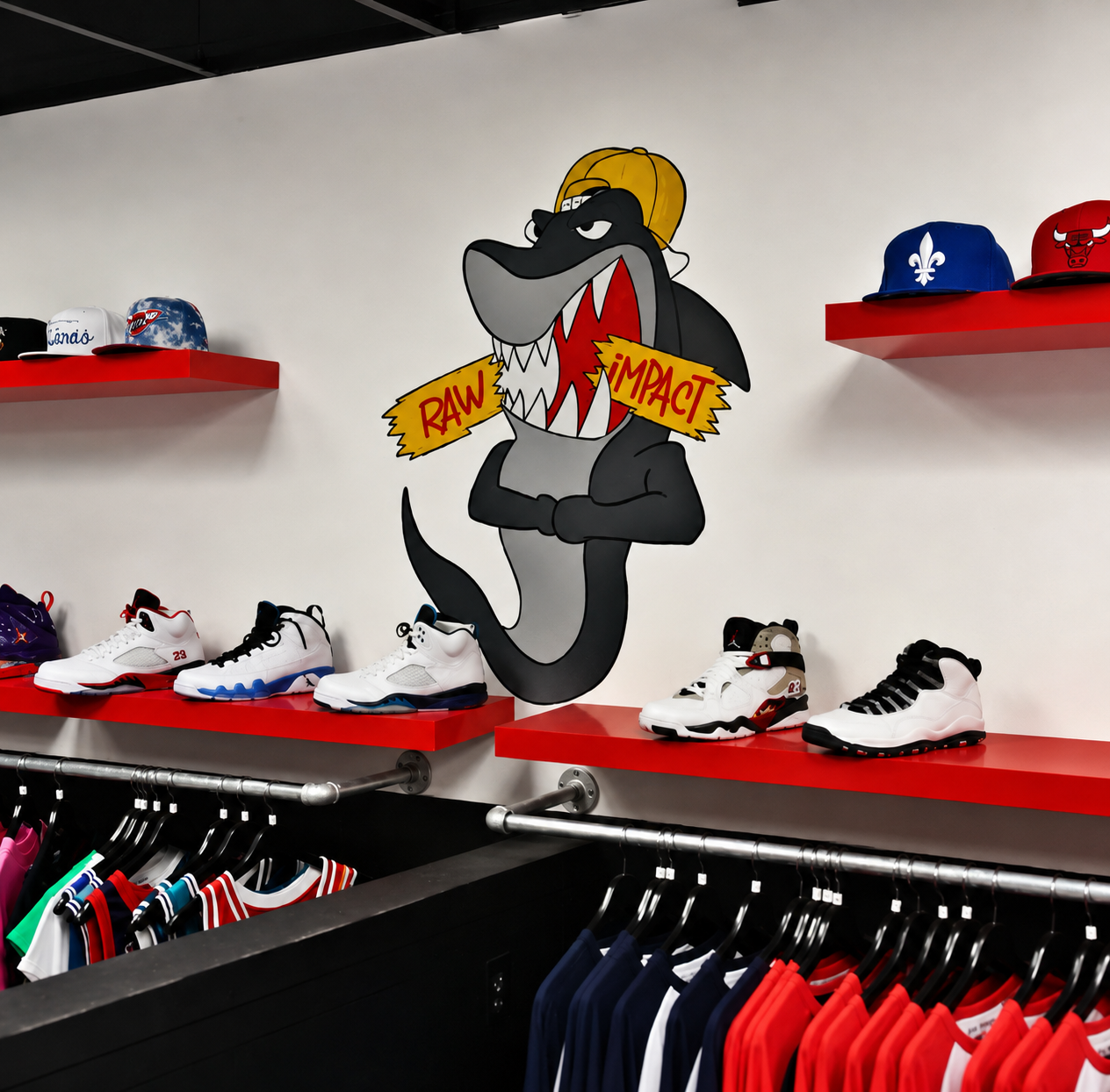

Rawimpact was recognized by the City of Detroit for being a marquee sponsor at Detroit's 'Summer-Jamz 16' along with Heineken powered by WGPR Hot 107.5 in June 2013.
