= Ed Opalewski =

American football player (1919–1993)

Profile
- Position: Tackle

Personal information
- Born: November 11, 1919; Detroit
- Died: March 4, 1993 (aged 73); Novi, Michigan
- Listed height: 6 ft 3 in (1.91 m)
- Listed weight: 230 lb (104 kg)

Career information
- High school: Pershing (MI)
- College: Michigan State Normal

Career history
- Detroit Lions (1943–1944)

Career statistics
- Games: 11
- Stats at Pro Football Reference

Edward Leo Opalewski Jr. (November 11, 1919 – March 4, 1993), sometimes known as "Opie", "Big Ed", and "The Sheriff", was an American football player.

Opalewski was born in Detroit in 1919. He attended Detroit's Pershing High School and played freshman football at the fullback position for Michigan State Normal College (now known as Eastern Michigan University) in 1940. He also competed in track in college.

Opalewski also played professional football in the National Football League (NFL) as a tackle for the Detroit Lions. He appeared in 11 NFL games, five as a starter, during the 1943 and 1944 seasons. He also played tackle for the Paterson Panthers of the American Football League in 1947.

He was married for 50 years to Virginia Golenbiewski Opalewski. After his playing career ended, he worked for General Motors in Ypsilanti, Michigan, from 1957 to 1980. He died at his home in Novi, Michigan, of cardiac arrest in 1993 at age 73.
