= Birwood Wall =

Historic separation wall in Detroit, Michigan, US

- U.S. National Register of Historic Places
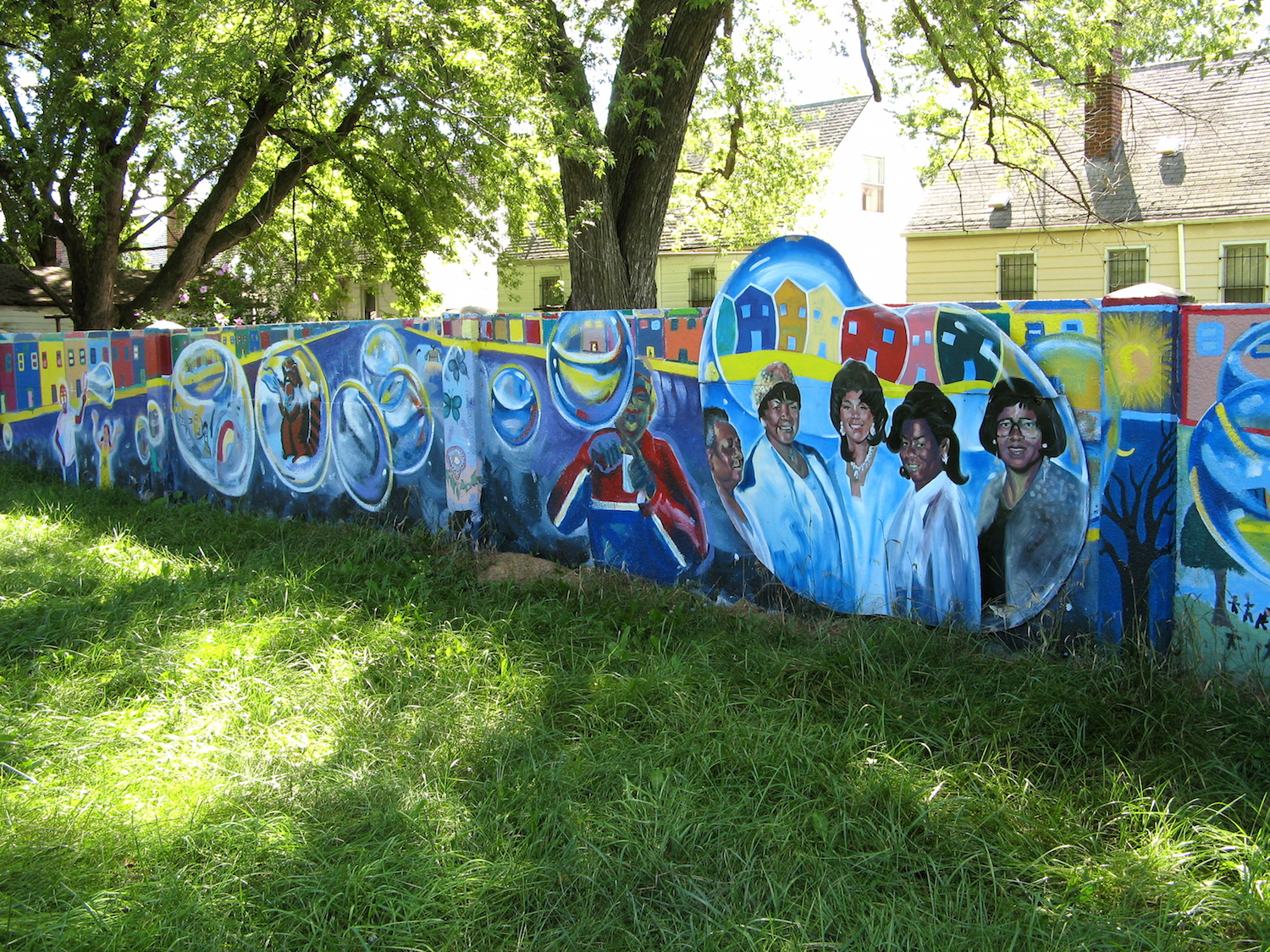
- The Detroit Wall as seen from Alfonso Wells Playground in August 2011
- Interactive map
- Location: Paralleling Birwood Avenue, Eight Mile-Wyoming, Detroit, Michigan
- Coordinates: 42°26′32″N 83°9′58″W
- Built: 1941
- MPS: The Civil Rights Movement and the African American Experience in 20th Century Detroit MPS
- NRHP reference No.: 100006100
- Added to NRHP: January 27, 2021

The Birwood Wall, also referred to as Detroit's Wailing Wall, Berlin Wall or The Detroit Eight Mile Wall, is a one-foot-thick (0.30 m), six-foot-high (1.8 m) separation wall that stretches about a half mile (0.80 km) in length. One foot (0.30 m) is buried in the ground and the remaining 5 feet (1.5 m) are visible to the community. It was constructed in 1941 to physically separate black and white homeowners on the sole basis of race. The wall no longer serves to racially segregate homeowners and, as of 1971, both sides of the barrier have been predominantly black.

The wall runs parallel to Birwood Avenue in the Eight Mile-Wyoming neighborhood of Detroit for three city blocks, with its northern end at an alley south of Eight Mile Road. An exposed stretch of the wall with no homes to the east runs through Alfonso Wells Memorial Playground, between Chippewa Avenue and Norfolk Street. This portion of the wall is decorated with murals commemorating milestones in civil rights in Detroit.

The wall was listed on the National Register of Historic Places in 2021, representing a physical element of the history of housing discrimination in the United States.

== Background ==
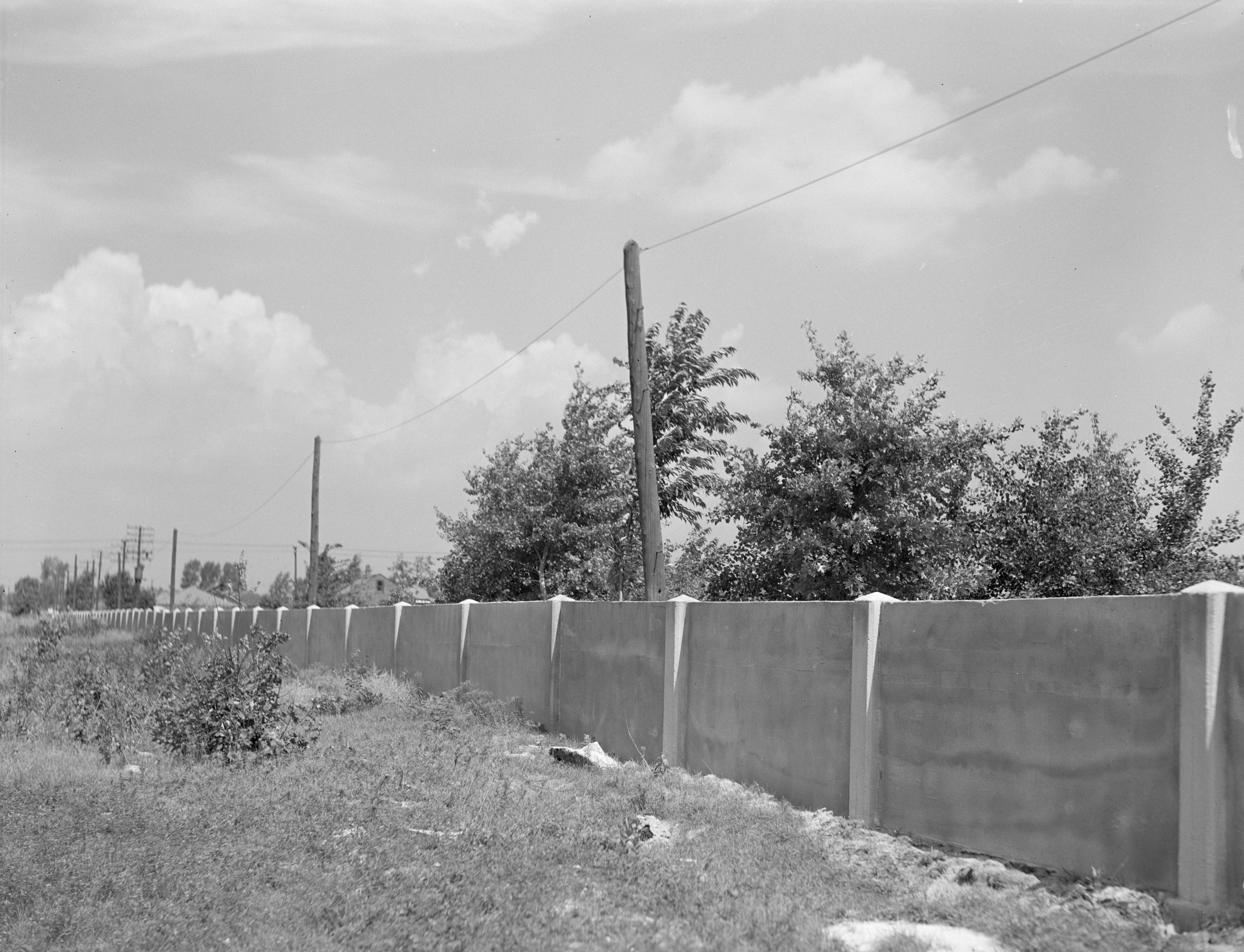
The wall shortly after construction in 1941

The World War I industrial economy of Detroit afforded opportunities for women and black men to become more active participants in the labor force of the city. A large percentage of white men were drafted to fight in the war, leaving many of their jobs vacant and needing to be filled. This allowed black citizens to fill empty job positions, causing a large demographic shift in the makeup of the Detroit workforce. In light of more job opportunities, the city experienced an increase in the population of black people seeking economic and social mobility. This trend was known nationwide as the Great Migration, as more than six million black people moved from the southern to the northern areas of the United States. But as white men were returning from war and more black citizens entered the city, competition for scarce housing increased tensions between the two groups. White residents took over most private-sector housing, pushing black residents to less desirable areas of the city. The Great Depression furthered the scarcity of housing as the population continued to soar.

The New Deal legislation implemented under President Franklin D. Roosevelt intended to make private housing more accessible to citizens. The Home Owners Loan Corporation (HOLC) was created in 1933, followed by the Federal Housing Administration (FHA). In short, these programs reduced barriers to housing by offering discounted payment plans spread out over 20–30 years. These policies significantly improved home-ownership accessibility for working-class white Detroit residents and promoted single-family units. Yet according to Thomas J. Sugrue, a Detroit scholar and historian, black residents did not benefit from the New Deal era of legislation because "local governments had the final say over the expenditure over the federal funds, the location of projects, and the type constructed." As a result of local government bodies being composed of white politicians, white residents received federal funding, while black residents were left to seek housing with no aid.

The primary concern of white Detroit residents was maintaining racial homogeneity. Local policies allowed for the prevention of black "infiltration" into white neighborhoods due in part to the HOLC members serving as federal appraisers. They identified areas that were "safe" for banks to issue loans to by giving each neighborhood a rating: A, B, C, or D. An "A," or "green," was practically guaranteed a loan, largely due to the fact that these areas were homogeneously white and affluent. In turn, a "D," or "red," neighborhood was occupied by black residents who were systematically prevented from receiving a loan. This became a phenomenon across the United States known as red-lining.

Children pose in front of the wall, 1941

In Detroit specifically, red-lining preserved racial homogeneity and increased racial tensions. For example, if a black family moved into a white neighborhood, the rating of the neighborhood would change and everyone's property value would decrease, creating resentment among the two communities. Between 1930 and 1950, three out of five homes purchased in the United States were financed by FHA, yet less than two percent of the FHA loans were made to non-white home buyers. This process of redlining was one of the main reasons as to why black Americans today have about one-tenth the household wealth of white Americans, as it deprived the black Americans of access to capital to purchase and improve homes. In addition to generational inequalities, the practice of residential discrimination also exacerbated racial tensions in primary education. In the case of the Detroit Wall, most of the kids on the west side attended MacDowell Elementary School, which was majority white. On the east side of the wall, the kids attended Higginbotham School, which was mostly black.

Without any financial aid, black neighborhoods became starkly different than white neighborhoods. Renovations, purchasing homes, and rent in these areas were far too expensive to afford, causing deterioration in these areas and overall lower living standards. The appearance of black neighborhoods solidified white resident's opinions that Black residents were a detriment to any neighborhood. Thomas J. Sugrue wrote, “the decaying neighborhoods offered seemingly convincing evidence to white homeowners that blacks were feckless and irresponsible and fueled white fears that blacks would ruin any neighborhood that they moved into.”

Additionally, the New Deal was perceived differently by the federal and local level. In Detroit, these policies caused debates between public housing and private home-ownership, two commodities that those living in Detroit believed could not work together. These debates were often racial, with public housing aimed to help black people in the city and private home-ownership aimed at helping middle class white people become homeowners. The debate over public housing was centered around the belief that such an idea would threaten the private sector. Affordable living for the lower class, usually minorities, meant interference with a successful, free market real estate. Community groups determined to keep their neighborhoods segregated lobbied against public housing projects, and contractors found business working in private housing.

The Eight Mile-Wyoming neighborhood, where this wall is located, was one of many that was significantly affected by the housing crisis. When originally settled by Black residents in the early 20th century, this neighborhood was located outside Detroit's city limits, and was described as a farmland where residents pooled resources in order to build their own homes. The neighborhood was annexed by Detroit in 1926. The houses were small, but the residents were proud of their homes they built up from nothing. In 1938, the Detroit Housing Commission conducted a survey and found residents living here to be among the poorest in Detroit. Despite this, the residents of this neighborhood were both independent and secure with over 90% of residents living in these single family built homes.

== Eight Mile community and construction ==
Due to redlining, the Eight Mile area was extremely poor and was considered a "blighted area". After World War II, a developer saw the area as a new spot to construct an all-white subdivision. This proposed subdivision was named "Blackstone Park." HOLC appraisers viewed this as high-risk because of how close it was to the neighborhood occupied by black people. FHA, as a result, was unable and unwilling to lend out loans for home construction. Sugrue reports, "the developer worked out a compromise with the FHA, garnering loans and mortgage guarantees in exchange for the construction of a foot-thick, six-foot-high wall, running for a half-mile on the property line separating the black and white neighborhoods." A representative of the owner of the Blackstone Park subdivision declared that the wall was being put up "simply to improve the subdivision by giving it a fixed border and trim." This statement was outlined in a Michigan Chronicle article which criticized the owner of the subdivision for attempting to establish a "Negro ghetto" by erecting the wall between the subdivision and the preexisting black neighborhoods.

Contractors and realtors were able to attract whites to this area because the wall would "protect them". It served to keep property values high and to keep the neighborhoods racially segregated. It became known as the Detroit Eight Mile Wall, the "Detroit Wailing Wall", and the Birwood Wall.

However, in 1948, the Supreme Court case Shelley v. Kraemer outlawed the enforcement of deed restrictions regarding race and other forms of discrimation. By the following year, houses on the west side of the wall, inside the Blackstone Park subdivision, appeared on the market, intended for black buyers. By the 1960s, both sides of the wall were majority black neighborhoods. Two black neighborhoods – one built by black activism, the other by white flight – became a single community, known as Eight Mile-Wyoming, with a wall in the middle.

== Wall today ==
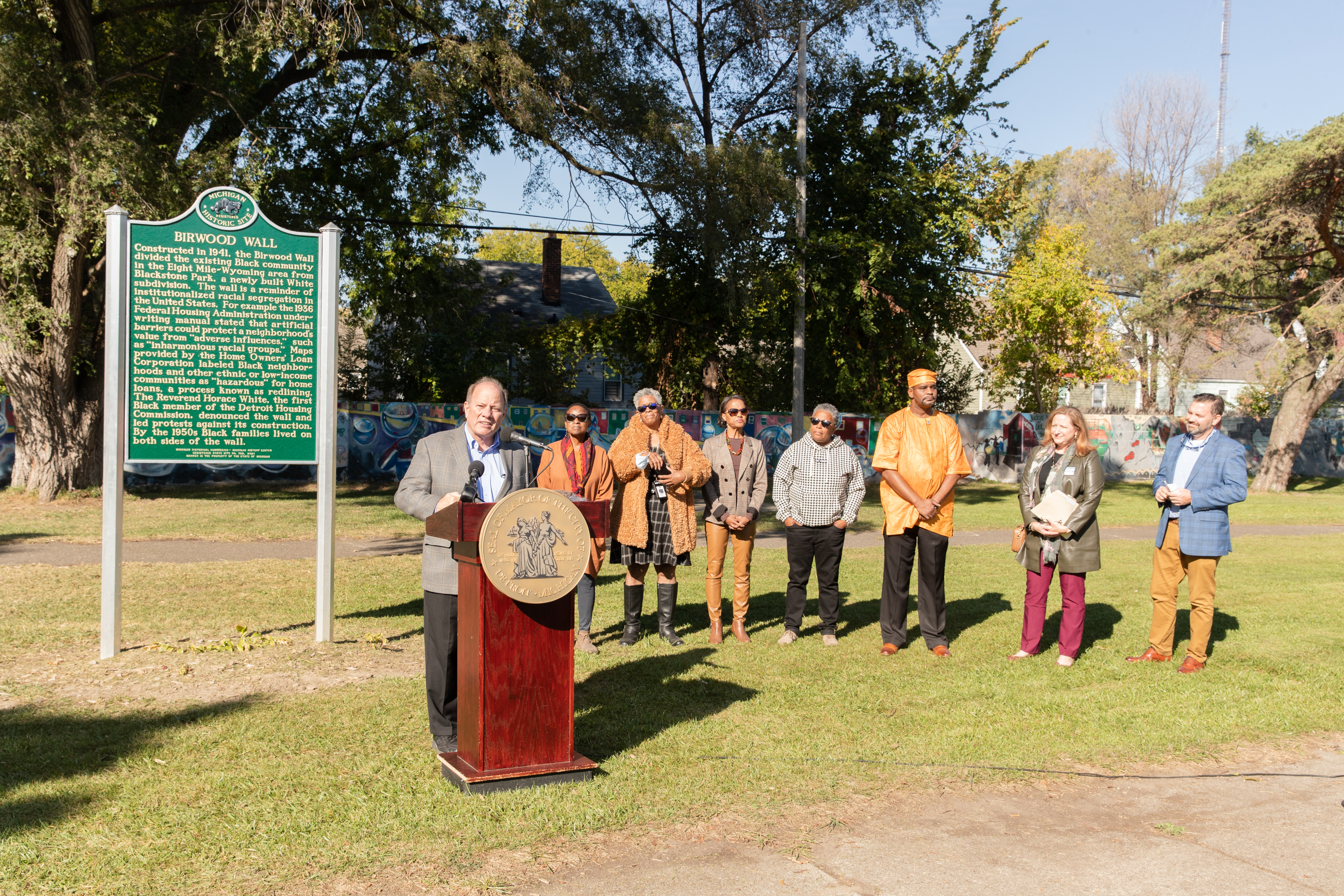
A Michigan historical marker was dedicated at the wall in 2022

The Wall still stands in the Eight Mile area to this day. The Wall's function has transformed from being a racial barrier to a backyard fence and mural for the current residents of this community. The residents are aware that the Wall was originally meant to be racially divisive, but now black people live on both sides of it. In 2006, a portion of the Wall was converted into a mural by Detroit residents and community activists. It serves as a reminder and recognition of history, but also of a hopeful, more colorful future. Regarding the wall today, Rochelle Riley, with Detroit Arts, Culture, and Entrepreneurship remarks that "history lost is history that can be repeated." Instead of eliminating the wall to erase the history of residential segregation and discrimination, the community chose to responsibly acknowledge these histories and aimed to educate future generations about the harms of such practices.

In 2021, the wall was listed on the National Register of Historic Places, as part of the Civil Rights Movement and the African American Experience in 20th Century Detroit Multiple Property Submission.
