= Pershing High School =

Coordinates: 42.4321°N 83.0644°W

Location
- 18875 Ryan Road; Detroit, Wayne, MI 48234; United States

Information
- Type: Public
- Motto: Students Rise. We All Rise.
- Opened: September 3, 1930
- Status: Open
- School district: Detroit Public Schools Community District
- NCES District ID: 2601103
- Superintendent: Nikolai Vitti
- NCES School ID: 260110304813
- Principal: Bryant Tipton
- Teaching staff: 23.50 (FTE)
- Grades: 9-12
- Enrollment: 378 (2023-2024)
- Student to teacher ratio: 16.09
- Colors: Blue and Gold
- Athletics conference: Detroit Public School League
- Mascot: Doughboys
- Website: https://pershing.detroitk12.org/

John J. Pershing High School is a four-year public high school in Detroit, Michigan. It is in Conant Gardens in proximity to the residential areas and also serves Krainz Woods. Pershing was governed by the Education Achievement Authority (EAA), which oversees failing schools, from 2011 until 2017, when all schools were transferred back to Detroit Public Schools Community District.

== History ==
Pershing High School opened in 1930 with capacity to serve more than 2,200 students. It was named after General John J. Pershing, a senior officer in the United States Army during World War I, best known for his involvement in the American Expeditionary Forces on the Western Front. General Pershing's troops were called doughboys, which was adopted as the high school's mascot.

In 2012, Kettering High School closed due to poor performance and some students were rezoned to Pershing.

Pershing had also been fraught with academic performance issues for nearly two decades; in 2011, the governor moved Pershing and four other at-risk public high schools into a separate district called the Education Achievement Authority (EAA). This district was a state initiative to reinvigorate struggling schools through a partnership with Eastern Michigan University, but lacked funding, planning, and sufficient governance.

EAA was closed in 2017 due to its low performance and the expiration of its partnership with Eastern Michigan University, and its schools were returned to the Detroit Public Schools Community District.

Concern over school closures continued and in 2017, discussions about which schools needed to go escalated. Closure criteria were initially based on test scores, then, after significant pushback from Detroit families, based on school capacity. At this point, Pershing was only at 25% capacity and had test scores in the bottom 5% for 2014, 2015, and 2016, and so was named one of 24 schools slated to close in June 2017.

During the COVID-19 pandemic in 2020, Pershing was one of several technology hubs in the district and served as a meal distribution site, provided mobile COVID-19 screenings, and provided resources for childcare and utility bills.

Construction of a new Pershing High School building began in 2025. The $77 million project is planned for completion in December 2028.

=== Legal trouble ===
In 2014, English teacher Tiffani Eaton-Davis attempted to break up a fight between two boys in her classroom with a broom after her attempts to reach security via walkie-talkie were unsuccessful. A cell phone video of the incident was posted online and EAA fired her the next day for violating the policy against corporal punishment; they faced immediate pushback by school, district, and state officials, as well as the Pershing community. EAA quickly rescinded their decision and offered her a job at any school in their district, but she declined and, in 2015, she sued. The lawsuit stated that she was not warned or prepared to break up violent fights every day; that one of the students in the fight had been suspended for gang-related activity and was not supposed to be on the premises; and that she was discriminated against for being a woman and for being Black, as white teachers in the same scenario were not disciplined. In 2016, she was awarded a settlement of $390,000.

== Student body ==
Pershing is a Title I-eligible school with Black students making up 95% of its enrollment as of 2020. Nearly 60% of the student body is male and 87% are eligible for free lunch.

== Academics ==
Student assessments
- 2021–22 school year Change vs. prior year

M-STEP 11th grade proficiency rates (Science / Social Studies)
- Advanced %: ≤10 / ≤10
- Proficient %: ≤10 / ≤10
- PR. Proficient %: <3 / –
- Not Proficient %: – / –

Average test scores
- SAT Total: 725.4 (▼ −45.8)

In 2020, Pershing had a graduation rate of 72.15%. During the 2017–2018 academic year, less than 5% of students achieved a SAT score that indicates proficiency in math or reading; the district as a whole scored more than 50% lower than the state average.

Electives include ACT prep, choir, dance, Jobs for America Graduation, JROTC, music theory, Police Cadet, and robotics. After-school programs include Credit Recovery, Wayne State University C2 Pipeline, and driver's ed. The standard curriculum includes: English language arts 9, 10, 11, and 12; algebra I, geometry, algebra 2, and probability and statistics; biology, chemistry, forensics for science, and physical science; civics, economics, US history, world history; Spanish I and II; and health, JROTC, and physical education.

== Athletics ==
Pershing offers eight sports: baseball, softball, basketball, cheerleading, track, cross country, football, and volleyball. The Doughboys are part of the Detroit Public School League, which is associated with the Michigan High School Athletic Association.

== Extracurriculars ==
Some of the activities offered at Pershing are robotics, the Detroit Area Pre-College Engineering Program (DAPCEP), JROTC, and STEM Club.

A recording studio was created on-campus through a partnership with JDilla Music Foundation (now called the James Dewitt Yancey Foundation), an organization created in honor of Pershing alumnus J Dilla, who died from lupus-induced cardiac arrest in 2006.

== Notable alumni ==
=== Actors ===
- Tim Meadows (born 1961), actor and comedian, former member of Saturday Night Live

=== Baseball ===
- Lenny Green (1933–2019), late MLB player for multiple American League teams
- Marvin Lane (born 1950), former MLB player for the Detroit Tigers
- Ted Sizemore (born 1945), former MLB player; 1969 Rookie of the Year; and CEO of the Baseball Assistance Team

=== Basketball ===
- Keith Appling (born 1992), former NBA player
- Mel Daniels (1944–2015), late ABA All-Star and MVP, 2x ABA MVP, 7x ABA All-Star, inducted in the Naismith Memorial Basketball Hall of Fame
- Ron Dorsey (born 1983), former basketball player
- Sherron Dorsey-Walker (born 1993), basketball player for Wilki Morskie Szczecin in the Polish Basketball League
- Kay Felder (born 1995), former NBA player
- Robert Hawkins (basketball) (1954–1993), late NBA player
- Spencer Haywood (born 1949), former NBA All-Star and NBA champion; Olympic gold medalist (1968); All-American at the University of Detroit; Naismith Memorial Basketball Hall of Fame inductee
- Willie Iverson (born 1945), former ABA basketball player
- Arthur Johnson (born 1982), basketball player
- Willie King (1915–1965), former professional basketball player in the National Basketball League
- Willie Mitchell (born 1975), former CBA and ABA player, and the 1994 Mr. Basketball of Michigan
- Derrick Nix (born 1990), NBA basketball player for the Windy City Bulls in the NBA G League
- Andre Ricks (born 1986), basketball player, trainer, and coach
- Ralph Simpson (born 1949), former NBA player and 5x ABA All-Star
- DeShawn Sims (born 1988), basketball player for Pistoia in Italy's Serie A2
- Steve Smith (born 1969), current basketball analyst for Turner Sports; former NBA All-Star and champion; Michigan State University All-American; and 2000 Summer Olympics gold medalist
- Justin Tillman (born 1996), basketball player for Hapoel Tel Aviv in the Israeli Basketball Premier League
- Kevin Willis (born 1962), former NBA All-Star and champion, second oldest NBA player in history

=== Football ===
- Brandon Barnes (offensive lineman) (born 1985), former NFL player
- Tom Cecchini (1944–2023), late football player and coach
- Al Day (1938–1979), late football player
- Glenn Doughty (born 1951), former NFL player for the Baltimore Colts, later founded the Shake and Bake Family Fun Center and the Career Information and Training Network
- Larry Foote (born 1980), former NFL player and current assistant coach for the Arizona Cardinals, 2x Super Bowl champion with the Pittsburgh Steelers
- George Genyk (1938–2017), late football player and coach
- Fred Julian (1938–2013), late NFL player and West Catholic High School and Grand Rapids Community College football coach
- Ed Opalewski (1919–1993), late NFL player for the Detroit Lions
- Paul Seal (born 1952), former NFL player for the New Orleans Saints and San Francisco 49ers
- Chuck Shonta (born 1937), former AFL player and All-Star for the Boston Patriots and football coach for Northville High School
- Harry Szulborski (1927–2017), late football player and Emerson High School football coach

=== Literature ===
- Melba Boyd (born 1950), Detroit poet, and Michigan Poet Laureate

=== Music ===
- Enchantment, soul/R&B band formed at Pershing, composed of Emanuel "EJ" Johnson, Joe "Jobie" Thomas, Bobby Green, Edgar "Mickey" Clanton, and David Banks
- Abdul "Duke" Fakir (1935–2024), co-founded the Motown quartet
- Mable John, Motown blues, gospel, and R&B singer
- Michael "Clip" Payne (born 1958), musician for Parliament-Funkadelic since 1977, often referred to as "The Man in the Box"
- Slum Village, hip hop group formed by Pershing alumni Baatin, T3, and J Dilla
- Levi Stubbs (1936–2008), late lead vocalist of the Motown act the Four Tops
- Gino Washington (born 1946), R&B and rock singer who released local hits "Out of This World" and "Gino Is a Coward"
- James "J Dilla" Yancey (1974–2006), late music producer, rapper, and member of the group Slum Village

=== Politics ===
- Brenda Lawrence (born 1954), former mayor of Southfield, Michigan and member of the US House of Representatives

=== Reporter ===
- Mike O'Hara sportswriter for The Detroit News from 1967 to 2008. He is also in the Michigan Sports Hall of Fame.
