= Mound Correctional Facility =

Prison in Michigan, United States

Coordinates: 42°25′24″N 83°02′38″W

Mound Correctional Facility was a Michigan Department of Corrections (MDOC) prison located in eastern Detroit, Michigan. It was adjacent to the Detroit Reentry Center (formerly the Ryan Correctional Facility). The facility which housed Mound was reopened in August 2013 as the Detroit Detention Center.

== History ==
Mound opened in 1994. It was on land previously used by DaimlerChrysler AG for storing automobiles.

Prior to January 8, 2012, Mound had 324.4 positions for employees, with most employees being prison guards and others being administrative employees, administrative support employees, program staff, counselors, and food service workers. As of 2011, 300 employees worked at Mound.

MDOC closed Mound on January 8, 2012. The planned closure was announced in 2011 as part of a budget balancing plan. The state projected that the closure could lead to a $50 million annual savings. Democratic Party members and representatives of unions in the Michigan State Legislature criticized the proposed closing. They said, as paraphrased by The Detroit Free Press, that "Closing the Mound prison is a betrayal of assurances the governor made earlier to keep it open". MDOC officials said that as the prison population decreased, the prison was expensive to operate. Kurt Weiss, a budget spokesperson said that the state did not want to close Mound but that they were unable to make a cost-cutting agreement so there was no other choice but to close the prison.

Jeff Gerritt, a columnist for the Detroit Free Press, said that the closure was not beneficial because prisons in northern Michigan have white staff members with mostly black prisoners, with these employees having no contact with African American people outside of a prison system, exacerbating racial tensions, and that relocating prisoners to the Upper Peninsula of Michigan would minimize visits from family and friends of the prisoners.

In May 2012 there was an announcement that the adjacent Ryan Correctional Facility would be converted into a center for parole violators, reducing the number of employees at Ryan. Dawson Bell of the Detroit Free Press said that "[t]he announcement was nevertheless greeted with skepticism by some department employees and others who had been encouraged by reports earlier this week that Ryan might remain open as a prison, while the shuttered Mound Facility next door was converted for use as a parolee detention center." Russ Marlan, a spokesperson for MDOC, said that it would have been too expensive to re-open Mound and convert it into a parole violator facility so MDOC decided not to do it.

Four months after the closure of Mound, the state announced that it planned to re-open the facility as a special population prison. Target prisoner groups included parolees who had minor parole violations and would be imprisoned for 90 or fewer days, and the prison had the possibility of housing state prisoners who were close to their release dates and needed to attend general population re-entry programs.

The facility which housed Mound was reopened in August 2013 as the Detroit Detention Center. The facility, which operates as a central lockup for Detroit, is staffed by personnel from the Michigan Department of Corrections and the Detroit Police Department.

== Facility ==
Mound was located in eastern Detroit, adjacent to the Krainz Woods community, Mound was on the eastern 39-acre (16 ha) portion of a 78-acre (32 ha) facility that also includes the Detroit Reentry Center (formerly Ryan Correctional Facility). The two share maintenance and warehouse functions. The prison was along Mound Road, adjacent to a residential area. A separation buffer consisted of two 12-foot (3.7 m) perimeter security fences topped with coiled stainless steel razor ribbon wire and a planting berm fencing with deciduous and evergreen trees separated Mound from the surrounding area, in order to keep prisoners in the prison and to prevent intruders from entering the facility. Other security features included four gun towers, an electronic detection system, and an armed vehicle on patrol 24 hours per day.

The prison had administrative offices, prisoner housing facilities, food service facilities, health care facilities, educational program facilities, and a small segregation unit.

== See also ==
- List of Michigan state prisons
