= Conant Gardens =

Human settlement in Detroit, Michigan, United States of America

Coordinates: 42.4299°N 83.0671°W

Conant Gardens is a historically Black neighborhood in northeast Detroit, Michigan. The neighborhood was once the most exclusive Black neighborhood in that city, and residents of Conant Gardens comprised the most highly educated Black enclave in Detroit.

== History ==
The land where Conant Gardens now lies was once owned by Shubael Conant, an abolitionist and the founder and first president of the Detroit Anti-Slavery Society in 1837. In his will, he stated that, "blacks could purchase or build new homes on his northeastern Detroit property." The area was not densely populated until around 1920, as growth of everything in and near Detroit related to the automobile industry soared. Conant Gardens' lack of restrictive covenants made it an appealing place for Black professionals to build homes. In 1942 and 1943, some in the primarily Black, middle-class community even protested against the construction of the Sojourner Truth Housing project, a federally funded public housing project, for fear that a public housing project near their neighborhood would bring down their 'exclusive' status. The residents of Conant Gardens allied with nearby white homeowners associations; Thomas J. Sugrue, author of The Origins of the Urban Crisis: Race and Inequality in Postwar Detroit, characterizes the alliance as "unlikely." Much like their white, middle-class counterparts, the Black residents of Conant Gardens created restrictive covenants to prevent multiple housing and other "undesirable" circumstances that could impact their status as the most exclusive Black neighborhood in Detroit. As late as 1966 the Krainz Woods Neighborhood Organization, a mostly-white organization posted, in an African-American newspaper, an advertisement asking for Conant Gardens residents to attend a meeting at an area church to protest proposed scattered-site housing and open occupancy. The white residents of Krainz Woods wanted to recruit middle-class Blacks in Conant Gardens to oppose public housing.

Conant Gardens was the childhood home of Slum Village founding members J Dilla, Baatin, and T3, as well as frequent collaborator Waajeed. The neighborhood is immortalized in the song "Conant Gardens," from Fantastic Vol. 2.

In 2001 the Conant Gardeners Club wrote and published a book about the neighborhood. Today, the median household income of the Conant Gardens neighborhood is $28,024, just over half of Michigan's median household income.

== Cityscape ==
Conant Gardens is in northeast Detroit, Michigan located just west of Detroit's Krainz Woods neighborhood. Houses were built in a variety of architectural styles including Tudor Revival and the Craftsmen style. It is located between Conant Street and the City of Highland Park, north of the City of Hamtramck. Seven Mile Road served as the boundary between Conant Gardens and a white working class area. The neighborhood boundaries are Conant Street, East Seven Mile, Ryan Road, and East Nevada Street. It is located almost 8 miles (13 km) from Paradise Valley. Due to its close proximity to Krainz Woods that neighboring community is sometimes mistaken as being within Conant Gardens. Pershing High School is located in Conant Gardens, in proximity to the residential area.

Thomas J. Sugrue, author of The Origins of the Urban Crisis: Race and Inequality in Postwar Detroit, said that Conant Gardens was "more suburban than urban, surrounded by open fields and remote from the city's business and industrial districts." The neighborhood had single family detached houses, many of which had large lawns. The streets were lined with trees. Sugrue said that the houses were modern, the lawns were "well-manicured" and the streets were "quiet".

The Double V Bar, a jazz hall, opened in 1942. The Club Deliese, a jazz hall which was owned by Jewish people and had an African American manager, opened in 1945. It changed its name to the "Club El-Morocco" three years after its opening. Lars Bjorn and Jim Gallert, authors of Before Motown: A History of Jazz in Detroit, 1920-60, said that the club remained open until at least 1953 and that Deliese was "the more substantial jazz spot of the two."

== Demographics ==
By the 1940s and 1950s, Conant Gardens was relatively well-populated. The residents were primarily Black businesspeople, lawyers, ministers, and teachers. In 1950, in terms of all neighborhoods with over 500 black people, the median income of black families and unrelated individuals of the tracts 603 and 604, respectively, were the highest in Detroit; the tracts correspond to Conant Gardens. That year, 60% of the residents owned their houses. Today, the neighborhood is 90.7% Black, 4.9% Native American, 0.9% White, 0.2% Hispanic or Latino, and 3.3% two or more races. 48.8% of today's neighborhood's residents live below the poverty line, which is higher than the city of Detroit's percentage of the population below the poverty line.

== Education ==
Conant Gardens is zoned to Detroit Public Schools. Residents are zoned to Mason K-8 School for elementary and middle school. All residents are zoned to Pershing High School, which has been ranked number 29 of 129 schools in Wayne County for athletics. The current Mason school was the former Farwell Elementary-Middle School. The previous Mason Elementary School closed in 2012 and consolidated into Farwell.

Previously Conant Gardens was zoned to Atkinson Elementary School. At a later point it was zoned to Van Zile Elementary School. Residents were previously zoned to Farwell K-8 for middle school.

== See also ==
- Neighborhoods in Detroit
- Public housing projects in Detroit
