= Detroit Detention Center =

Prison in Michigan, United States

Detroit Detention Center (DDC)
- Interactive map of Detroit Detention Center (DDC)
- Location: Detroit, Michigan; 42°25′24″N 83°02′38″W
- Status: Open
- Security class: Detention center
- Capacity: 200
- Opened: August 2013
- Managed by: Detroit Police Department, Michigan Department of Corrections

Detroit Detention Center (DDC) is a detention center located in eastern Detroit, Michigan. The facility, which operates as a central lockup for Detroit, is staffed by personnel from the Detroit Police Department and the Michigan Department of Corrections.

== General ==
The facility, which operates as a central lockup for Detroit and can hold up to 200 detainees. It is adjacent to the Detroit Reentry Center.

== History ==
The facility previously housed Mound Correctional Facility, which was closed on January 8, 2012. It was reopened as part of an inter-agency collaboration between the State of Michigan and City of Detroit in August 2013 as the Detroit Detention Center.

== Staffing ==
It was reopened as part of an inter-agency collaboration between the State of Michigan and City of Detroit in an effort to reduce the number of Detroit police officers required to staff the facility. The Michigan Department of Corrections provides the center with 51 staff.

== See also ==
- List of Michigan state prisons
