= Detroit Reentry Center =

Former prison in Michigan, United States

Detroit Reentry Center (RRF)
- Interactive map of Detroit Reentry Center (RRF)
- Location: Detroit, Michigan; 42°25′31″N 83°03′43″W
- Status: Closed
- Security class: Level II
- Opened: 1991
- Closed: January 9th 2021
- Managed by: Michigan Department of Corrections
- Warden: Ken Romanowski
- Website: Official website

Detroit Reentry Center (RRF), previously the Ryan Correctional Facility, was a prison of the Michigan Department of Corrections located in eastern Detroit, Michigan. It is adjacent to the Detroit Detention Center.

== History ==
It opened in 1991 as the Ryan Correctional Facility. The area was previously used by DaimlerChrysler to store automobiles.

An escape from Ryan occurred on August 21, 1994, with ten prisoners escaping. Nine prisoners were recaptured and according to authorities one died of a drug overdose. On Monday August 29, 1994 a group of about 500 area residents held a meeting in the W.L. Bonner Cultural Center about the prison, and the residents decided that they needed to have the prison closed. The residents said that, prior to the prison's construction, the state had said that "harden" and "violent" criminals would not be held in that facility. On November 5, 1994, about sixteen members of the Krainz Woods Neighborhood Organization, including at least eight elderly people, demonstrated in front of the Ryan Correctional Facility, saying that the state did not implement promised measures, improving neighborhood lighting, hiring employees from the neighborhood, and implementing a grant to pay for security doors on the houses of the residents.

In March 1995 a dialysis unit opened.

In May 2012 the Michigan Department of Corrections announced a plan to convert the Ryan facility from a regular prison to a parole violator facility and to close the former parole office near Caro and to move the parole office inside the Ryan facility. The state said that Ryan had an early operation cost of $35.4 million as a regular corrections facility but would cost $23 million to operate per year as a re-entry center. The state announced that the Detroit Parole Office would relocate to be inside the Ryan facility and that the Tuscola Residential Re-entry program previously located in Caro would be relocated to Detroit. In May 2012 the prison had 365 employees; the change would reduce the number to 157, because the parole office would house prisoners with fewer security requirements. The state planned to send 1,000 prisoners to a prison that is re-opening in Muskegon, the Muskegon Correctional Facility. Russ Marlan, a spokesperson for MDOC, said that the main reason for the move was to increase space for parole violators to Detroit so that, in case of a violation, the state would not have to release them anyway or to transport them to Jackson. Detroit at the time had over half of the 20,000 parolees in the state correctional system.

Glenn S. Anderson, a Michigan state senator from Westland, said that the plan should not proceed because the prisoners would become discipline problems since it is too far for family members to come visit them. Anderson called the plan "another attack on Detroit." Anderson further argued that the prison is among the most efficient prisons in the state prison system and is one of the newest. Marlan said that because the prison is in a residential area and because the prison houses fewer prisoners, its operating costs are higher than the costs of the Muskegon prison.

Dawson Bell of the Detroit Free Press said that "[t]he announcement was nevertheless greeted with skepticism by some department employees and others who had been encouraged by reports earlier this week that Ryan might remain open as a prison, while the shuttered Mound Facility next door was converted for use as a parolee detention center." Marlan said that it would have been too expensive to re-open Mound and convert it into a parole violator facility so MDOC decided not to do it. Anderson argued that it would have made more sense to put a parole facility at Mound instead of at Ryan. Bell said "A Facebook page for Michigan Corrections Organization members, the prison system's largest union, was filled with complaints Thursday afternoon about the disruption the changes will bring to workers' lives, and predictions that the claimed efficiencies will not materialize."

== Facility ==
The prison is located in eastern Detroit, Michigan, adjacent to the Krainz Woods community. It is on a 39-acre (16 ha) plot of land located off of Ryan Road, on the western side of a 78-acre (32 ha) area that also houses the Detroit Detention Center. The Reentry Center and Mound share maintenance and warehouse functions. The prison, as a re-entry center, was to have 400 short term slots for parole violators and 160 residential re-entry slots for parolees. The state also planned to have room for an additional 400 parolees or parole violators.

The prison itself has housing facilities, vocational instruction facilities, educational facilities, security facilities, administrative offices, a health clinic, and food service areas. It also houses a dialysis unit, which serves 44 prisoners. A 6-foot (1.8 m) landscaped berm with deciduous and evergreen trees separated the prison from the surrounding area. The perimeter has two 12-foot (3.7 m) fences and a buffer fence. In addition the prison houses gun towers, razor-ribbon wire, and electronic detection systems.

== Closing ==
It was announced in October 2020 that the facility would close citing fewer prisoners and other changes, in January 2021.

== See also ==
- List of Michigan state prisons
