= Black Bottom, Detroit =

Defunct neighborhood in Detroit, Michigan

Coordinates: 42°20′26″N 83°02′27″W

Black Bottom was a predominantly black neighborhood in Detroit, Michigan. The term has sometimes been used to apply to the entire neighborhood including Paradise Valley, but many consider the two neighborhoods to be separate. Together, Black Bottom and Paradise Valley were bounded by Brush Street to the west, the Grand Trunk railroad tracks to the east, south to the Detroit River, and bisected by Gratiot Avenue. The area north of Gratiot Avenue to Grand Boulevard was defined as Paradise Valley.

Although the name "Black Bottom" is often erroneously believed to be a reference to the African-American community that developed in the 20th century, the neighborhood was actually named by early French colonial settlers for the dark, fertile topsoil found in the area (known as river bottomland). During World War I, Black Bottom was home to many Eastern European Jewish immigrants, and the Great Migration influx of southern African Americans combined with redlining created a majority black neighborhood within Detroit. As the Black Bottom grew, it became a lively area with jazz bars and nightclubs. From the 1930s to the 1950s, residents in Black Bottom made significant contributions to American music, including blues, Big Band, and jazz.

Despite the rich cultural and musical hub of Black Bottom, the neighborhood was plagued with urban poverty. Most of Black Bottom's residents were employed in manufacturing and the automotive factory jobs. Some black business owners and clergymen operating in the neighborhood were able to rise to the middle class, however many moved to the newer and better-constructed West Side neighborhoods. Historical lack of access for the general population of African Americans to New Deal and Veterans Administration housing benefits combined with redlining segregated the neighborhoods from surrounding areas.

In the early 1960s, the Black Bottom and Paradise Valley neighborhoods were demolished for the purpose of slum clearance and to make way for the construction of I-375 highway. Homes and businesses were demolished, and residents relocated to outside neighborhoods.

== Geography ==
Historically, the primary business district was in an area bounded by Vernor, John R., Madison, and Hastings, with Gratiot Avenue running through the district as a "spoke" on the "hub-and-spoke" road layout of Detroit. The business district included hotels, restaurants, music stores, bowling alleys, shops, policy offices, and grocery stores. There were 17 nightclubs in the business district. The sunken I-375 highway passes directly over where Hastings Avenue once was.

== History ==
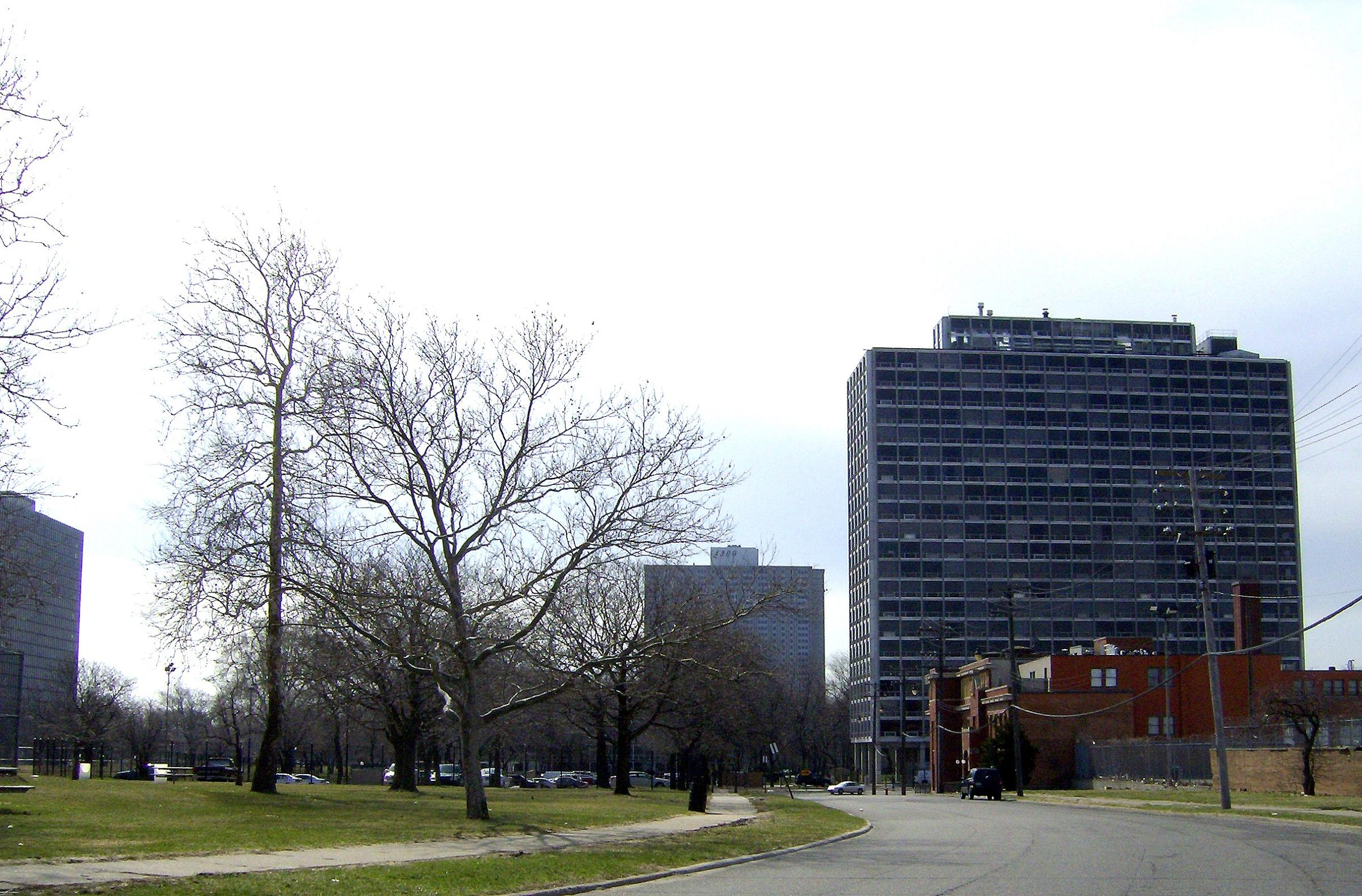
Lafayette Park, Detroit, redevelopment over Black Bottom

Historically, this geographical area was the source of the River Savoyard, which was buried as a sewer in 1827. The river's flooding produced rich bottomland soils, for which early French colonial settlers named the area "Black Bottom". Before World War I, European immigrants populated the area and built the frame houses.

In the early 20th century, European immigrants and blacks lived together in an ad-hoc integrated neighborhood. Coleman Young, the first black mayor of Detroit, moved to Black Bottom with his family in 1923; he states his neighbors as Italian, Syrian, German, and Jewish. Young is quoted as having "loved that neighborhood." Surrounding neighborhoods passed restrictive covenants prohibiting blacks from purchasing or renting property in the adjacent areas, functionally confining residents to Black Bottom. During the Great Migration, the area was primarily settled by blacks who established a community of businesses, social institutions, and night clubs. Detroit's Broadway Avenue Historic District contains a sub-district sometimes called the Harmonie Park District. It is associated with the legacy of Detroit's music from the 1930s-1950s.

The area's main commercial avenues were Hastings and St. Antoine streets. Paradise Valley contained night clubs where famous artists such as Billie Holiday, Sam Cooke, Ella Fitzgerald, Duke Ellington, Billy Eckstine, Pearl Bailey, and Count Basie regularly performed. In 1941, Orchestra Hall was named Paradise Theatre. Reverend C. L. Franklin, father of singer Aretha Franklin, originally established his New Bethel Baptist Church on Hastings Street.

Black Bottom was one of the poorest and densest sections of Detroit, with a third of black Detroiters living within Paradise Valley. Homes commonly held three to four families within the dwelling. Overcrowding, disease, crime, and vermin ran rampant. Income inequality and redlining contributed to deferred housing upkeep and maintenance, which further deteriorated housing conditions.

Following World War II, two-thirds of the physical structures of Black Bottom had been classified as aging and substandard, lacking modern amenities, or sitting in significant disrepair. The city government considered these areas slums and designated those remaining after the highway construction for clearance through a series of revitalization projects. Areas of both Black Bottom and Paradise Valley faced destruction for the construction of medical and city-run institutions, as well as public housing projects. The passage of the Federal Housing Act of 1949 funded demolition. The city of Detroit sent photographers out to document structures. The photographs are now housed in the Burton Historical Collection at the Detroit Public Library. By 1950, 423 residences, 109 businesses, 22 manufacturing plants, and 93 vacant lots had been condemned for the freeway project.

The Federal Highway Act of 1956 funded the highway construction over Hastings Street and surrounding city blocks. The highways, such as the Chrysler Freeway (formerly Oakland-Hastings), bisected the rest of the Lower East Side, including Paradise Valley and Black Bottom. The Edsel Ford Freeway also cut through the northernmost part of Paradise Valley.

The sites of Black Bottom and Paradise Valley were replaced with private housing from the Gratiot Redevelopment Project. The city also supported construction of Lafayette Park, a modernist residential development designed by Ludwig Mies van der Rohe, intended as a model neighborhood containing residential townhouses, apartments and high-rises with commercial areas. Many of the former residents of Black Bottom were relocated to public housing projects, such as the Brewster-Douglass Housing Projects (a public housing project built near Black Bottom starting in the 1930s) and Jeffries Homes. Jeffries Homes was demolished in 2001, and Brewster-Douglass was demolished in 2008.

In 2000, the final three structures of Paradise Valley were razed. A Michigan Historical Site marker sign on the former intersection of Adams Avenue and St. Antoine St., currently near Ford Field, exists as the last physical marker of the neighborhood. Architect Emily Kutil plans to recreate the neighborhood virtually, using photos from the Detroit Public Library's Burton Historical Collection, through a website called Black Bottom Street View. The website will purportedly also feature oral histories from past residents.

The University of Michigan and Bedrock Detroit previously announced a new project at 1400 S. Antoine St. (at the intersection of Gratiot Ave. and I-375) for a 190,000-square-foot (18,000 m^{2}) structure including, said the Michigan Daily, "residential units, a hotel, a conference center and a business collaboration and incubation space." Project funders included Stephen M. Ross and Dan Gilbert. Professor Stephen Ward of the University of Michigan's Department of Afro-American studies challenged the project; signing a Change.org petition entitled "#UMichRegentrifiers: Invest in Detroiters" which was created by a University of Michigan student opposing the project. This project was cancelled and moved to a different location downtown in 2021. The site remains empty with no concrete plans as of early 2024.

In September 2022, the Federal Highway Administration awarded Detroit a $104-million grant for the I-375 project which would demolish the current 1.062-mile-long (1.709 km) sunken highway to construct a proposed lower speed boulevard at street-level. This project is slated to start construction in 2025. This project will reconnect neighborhood streets cut off by the sunken highway for decades.

== Notable people ==
- Richard Harris, pioneering Techno and Electro musician
- Robert Hayden, poet, essayist, and educator
- Erma Henderson, first African American woman on the Detroit City Council
- Joe Louis, professional boxer
- Elijah Muhammad, the leader of the Nation of Islam from 1934 until his death in 1975
- Fard Muhammad, the founder of the Nation of Islam, who disappeared around 1934
- Della Reese, jazz and gospel singer and actress
- Sugar Ray Robinson, professional boxer
- Diana Ross, singer
- Stephen M. Ross, real estate developer, philanthropist, and sports team owner
- Mary Wells, Motown singer
- Coleman Young, mayor of Detroit, Michigan

== See also ==
- History of African Americans in Detroit

== Bibliography ==
- Binelli, Mark (2012). Detroit City Is the Place to Be (1st ed.). New York: Metropolitan Books, Henry Holt and Company. ISBN 978-0-8050-9229-5.
- Sugrue, Thomas J (2005). The Origins of the Urban Crisis: Race and Inequality in Postwar Detroit. United States: Princeton University Press ISBN 978-0691121864
- Woodford, Arthur M (2001). This Is Detroit, 1701-2001. Detroit: Wayne State University Press. ISBN 9780814329146.
