= Willie Iverson =

American basketball player

Personal information
- Born: October 8, 1945 (age 80) Detroit, Michigan, U.S.
- Listed height: 6 ft 0 in (1.83 m)
- Listed weight: 180 lb (82 kg)

Career information
- High school: Pershing (Detroit, Michigan)
- College: Central Michigan (1965–1968)
- NBA draft: 1968: undrafted
- Position: Point guard
- Number: 21

Career history
- 1968–1969: Miami Floridians
- Stats at Basketball Reference

Willie Iverson (born October 8, 1945) is an American former professional basketball point guard who played one season in the American Basketball Association (ABA) as a member of the Miami Floridians during the 1968–69 season.

Born in Detroit, Michigan, he attended Central Michigan University where he played on their basketball team. Willie, has 4 kids and 5 grandchildren. Willie taught 8th grade at East Bethlehem Lutheran School on Detroit's east side and was the basketball coach there. He attended Pershing High School in Detroit where he made All-City and All-State Basketball player in 1964 and 1965.
