= Brewster-Douglass Housing Projects =

Public housing development in Detroit, Michigan

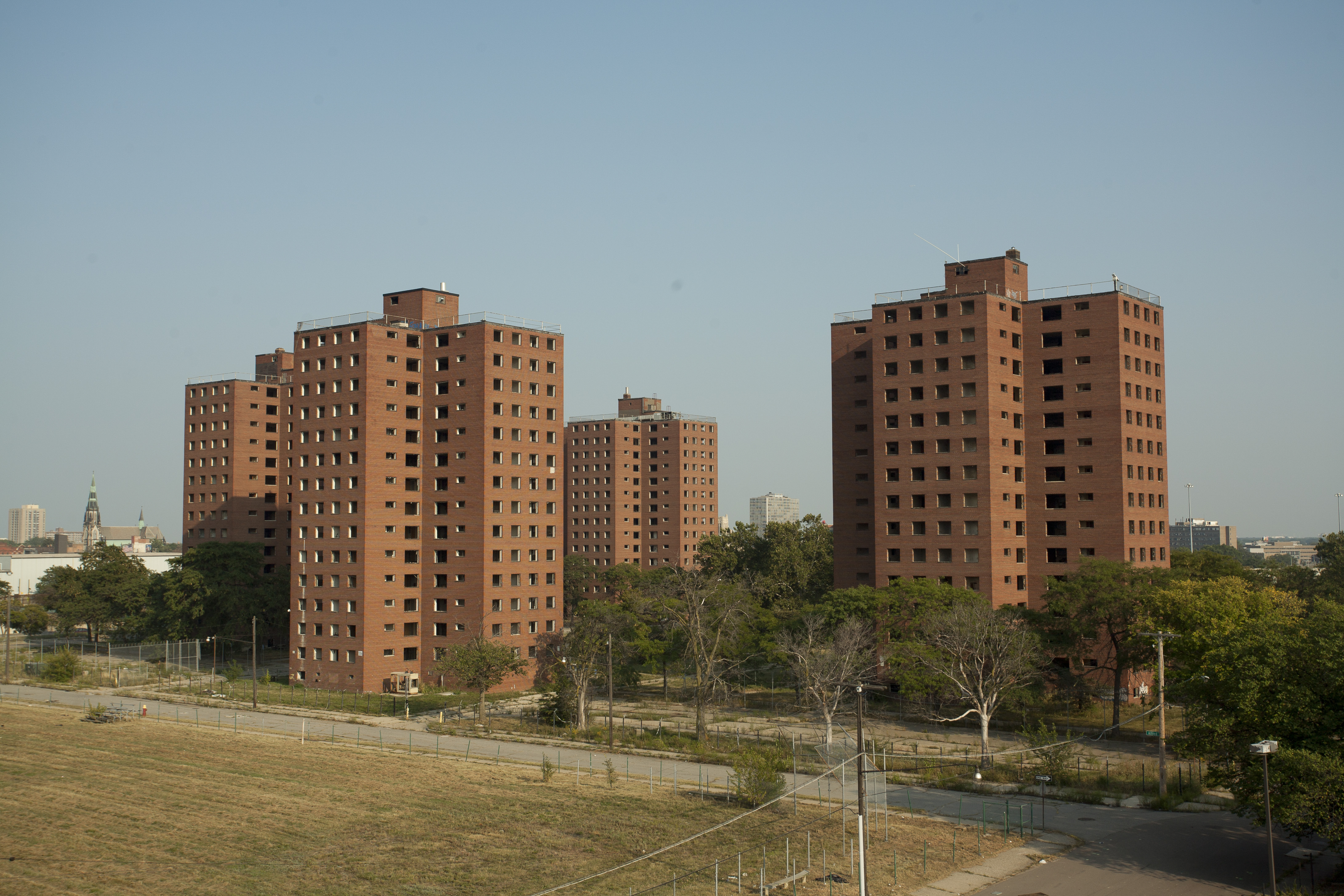
- The four remaining towers as seen in 2010
- Interactive map of the Brewster-Douglass Housing Projects area

General information
- Type: Residential
- Location: 2700 St. Antoine Street, Detroit, Michigan, United States
- Coordinates: 42°20′58″N 83°03′00″W
- Groundbreaking: 1935
- Completed: 1942–1952
- Demolished: 2003–2014

Height
- Height: 161 ft (49 m)

Technical details
- Floor count: 14

Design and construction
- Architects: Harley, Ellington & Day; Detroit Housing Commission; Smith Hinchman & Grylls

The Brewster-Douglass Housing Projects (officially named the Frederick Douglass Homes, and alternately named Frederick Douglass Projects, Frederick Douglass Apartments, Brewster-Douglass Homes, and Brewster-Douglass Projects) comprised the largest government-subsidized residence and housing project owned by the city of Detroit. It was located in the Brush Park section on the east side of Detroit, Michigan, United States, near the Chrysler Freeway, Mack Avenue and St. Antoine Street. The project was named after Brewster Street, which ran through the area, and Frederick Douglass, African American abolitionist, author, and reformer. All of its buildings were demolished in phases between 2003 and 2014.

The complex was home to such notable figures as Diana Ross, Mary Wilson, Florence Ballard, Loni Love, Smokey Robinson, and Etterlene DeBarge during their formative years.

== History ==
=== Hastings Street ===
Hastings Street, originally the center of the Jewish community in Detroit, had become the center of Black culture in Detroit between the 1920s and the 1950s. Located at the southern edge of the future Brewster-Douglass Homes, the street was the home of innumerable salons and entertainment venues. With the addition of the high-rises and an influx of people moving into the housing, Hastings Street was billed as the place one could fulfill any conceivable need. Hastings Street was most famously referenced in the John Lee Hooker song "Boogie Chillen'".

=== Brewster-Douglass Homes ===
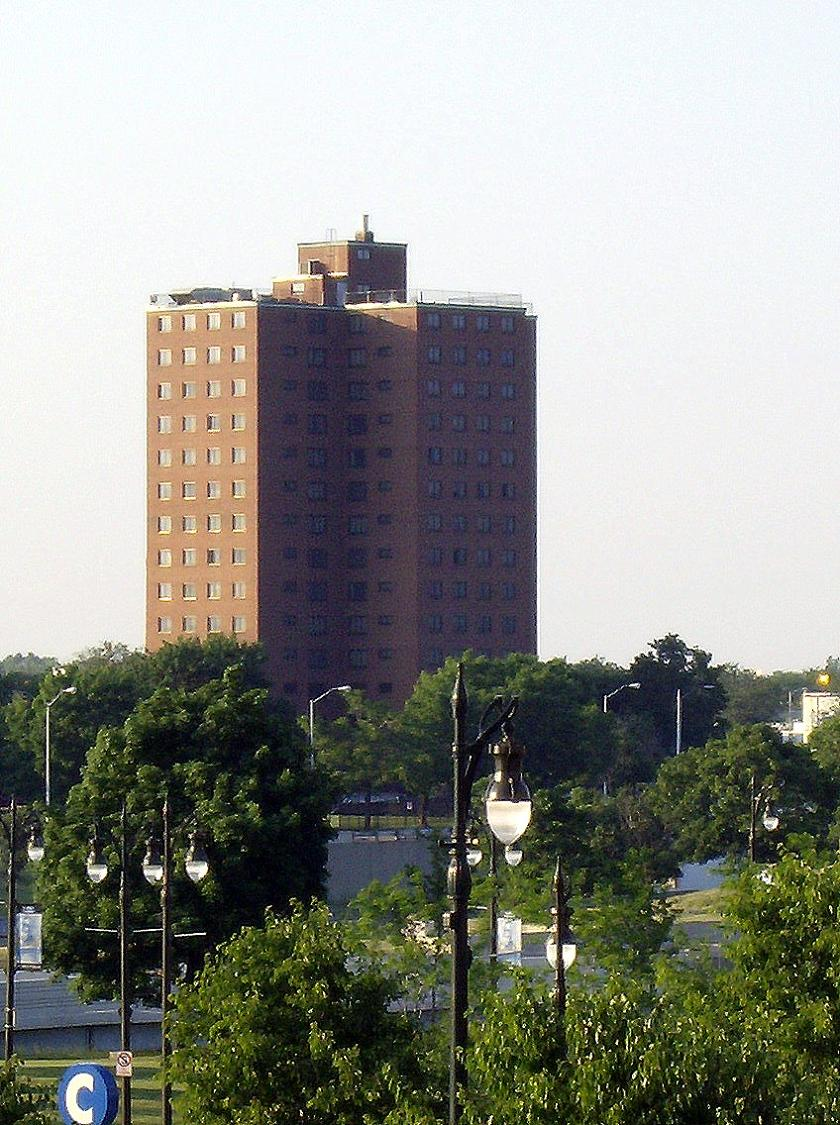
Frederick Douglass tower in 2007

The Brewster Project and Frederick Douglass Apartments were built between 1935 and 1955. They were designed by Harley, Ellington & Day of Detroit. The Brewster Project began construction in 1935, when First Lady Eleanor Roosevelt broke ground for the 701-unit development. The first phase, consisting of low-rise apartment blocks, was completed in 1938. An expansion of the project completed in 1941 brought the total number of housing units to 941.

The Frederick Douglass Apartments, built immediately to the south of the Brewster Project, began construction in 1942. Apartment rows, two 6-story low-rises, and six 14-story high rises were completed between 1952 and 1955. The combined Brewster-Douglass Project was five city blocks long, and three city blocks wide, and housed anywhere between 8,000 and 10,000 residents at its peak capacity.

The Brewster-Douglass Project were built for the "working poor". The Detroit Housing Commission required an employed parent for each family before establishing tenancy. As the Commission became less selective, crime became a problem in the 1960s and 1970s, and the projects fell into disrepair. The Frederick Douglass Apartment towers were converted to senior housing.

In 1991, the low-rise apartment blocks north of Wilkins Street, the original Brewster Project, were demolished, and by 1998 had been replaced with 250 townhomes. This new public housing, administratively distinct from the Frederick Douglass Homes project, was dubbed the "Brewster Homes", and still exists today.

The remaining housing on the project site continued to deteriorate. Two of the six 14-story Frederick Douglass Apartments towers, 303 and 304, were demolished in 2003, in an effort to consolidate living space and reduce maintenance costs. By 2008, only 280 families remained in the Frederick Douglass Homes complex, and the decision was made to shut down the housing entirely. The buildings south of Wilkins street were left abandoned after that date.

On July 29, 2013, 23-year-old French artist Bilal Berreni was found dead from a gunshot wound on the property of Brewster-Douglass, having last been seen the day before. Found without identification, Berreni's body was not identified for 7 months; three suspects were each sentenced to decades in prison.

From historic marker on the site of Brewster Homes

Between 1910 and 1940 Detroit, Michigan's African American population increased dramatically. In 1935, First Lady Eleanor Roosevelt broke ground for the Brewster Homes, the nation’s first federally funded public housing development for African Americans. The homes opened in 1938 with 701 units. When completed in 1941 there were 941 units bounded by Beaubien, Hastings, Mack and Wilkins Streets. Residents were required to be employed and there were limits on what they could earn. Former residents described Brewster as 'community filled with families that displayed love, respect and concern for everyone in a beautiful, clean and secure neighborhood.' The original Brewster Homes were demolished in 1991 and replaced by 250 townhouses.

=== Demolition ===
In March 2012, Mayor of Detroit Dave Bing announced that the Detroit Housing Commission planned to request funding from the Department of Housing and Urban Development to demolish all remaining housing on the Frederick Douglass Homes site, but redevelop the abandoned Brewster-Wheeler Recreation Center. The vacant land would then be developed as affordable housing and commercial space. The demolition was announced in November 2012 and began in September 2013. Demolition was substantially complete by the end of August 2014.

In 2016, a committee of several city agencies proposed selling the site to Dan Gilbert's firm Bedrock Detroit for redevelopment. The development would be a mixed-income neighborhood with both townhouses and apartment buildings. Gilbert negotiated to buy the Brewster-Douglass site for $23 million. His plans called for more than 900 apartments to be built on the site at a cost of over $300 million. The Detroit City Council approved the plans in July 2018, and the United States Department of Housing and Urban Development approved Gilbert's purchase in 2019.

=== Brewster Wheeler Apartments ===
On November 14, 2025, a ceremonial groundbreaking for 211 affordable housing units was held on the vacant site of the Brewster-Douglass Housing Projects. Overall development is set to complete in 2027.

== Constituent buildings ==
The six concrete-framed towers were designed in the Modern movement architectural style and were faced in brick. They were virtually identical in look. Each rose to the height of 15 floors.

Building Name	Address	Year Completed	Year Demolished
Frederick Douglass Apartments – Tower 306	Chrysler Freeway & East Vernor Highway	1952	2014
Frederick Douglass Apartments – Tower 305	Chrysler Freeway & East Vernor Highway	1952	2014
Frederick Douglass Apartments – Tower 302	2702 Saint Antoine Street	1952	2014
Frederick Douglass Apartments – Tower 301	Chrysler Drive at Alfred Street	1952	2014
Frederick Douglass Apartments – Tower 304	2602 Saint Antoine Street	1952	2003
Frederick Douglass Apartments – Tower 303	650 Alfred Street	1952	2003

== Schools ==
The buildings were zoned to the following Detroit Public Schools facilities:

- Spain Elementary School (K–8)
- Martin Luther King High School (9–12)

== In popular culture ==
- The claymation animated series The PJs was based on the housing project.
- It was seen in screenshots for the movie Dreamgirls, as well as D12's debut music video.
- Brewster-Douglass is mentioned in the first verse of singer/drag queen RuPaul's hit single "Supermodel (You Better Work)".
- Rapper Elzhi shot the album cover for his 2011 album Elmatic at the Brewseter-Douglass basketball court.
- It is the location for the copper scavenging scenes of Ryan Gosling's 2014 surreal fantasy thriller, Lost River.
- It is the setting for the basketball court scene of the 2014 science fiction drama Monsters: Dark Continent.
- The original members of The Supremes (Florence Ballard, Mary Wilson, Diana Ross, and Betty McGlown; initially known as the Primettes), all lived in the Brewster-Douglass project.

== See also ==
- Public housing in Detroit
