= Jeffries Projects =

Former public housing project located in Detroit, Michigan, United States

Coordinates: 42°20′29.5″N 83°04′02.7″W

The Jeffries Homes, also called the Jeffries Housing Projects, was a public housing project located in Detroit, Michigan, near the Lodge Freeway. It included 13 high-rises and hundreds of row house units, and was named for Detroit Recorder's Court Judge Edward J. Jeffries, Sr., who was also father of Detroit Mayor Edward J. Jeffries, Jr.

== History ==
The first phase, Jeffries West, opened in 1953 as a complex of eight 14-story towers. The second phase included five additional towers in Jeffries West and Jeffries East, 415 apartments in a set of low-rise apartment blocks, added in 1955. In total, the project included 2,170 housing units on 47 acres. At first, the complex was popular among many Detroit residents who were eager to move into the new buildings. But by the late 1960s, the buildings had become a haven for drug dealers and an area with a high crime rate.

== Redevelopment ==
Five towers of the complex were demolished in 1997, and four additional towers were imploded in 2001 to make way for the redevelopment of the site. An additional tower was demolished approximately two years later. The remaining tenants of the Jeffries were moved to Freedom Place and Research Park housing complexes, approximately 8 city blocks from the Jeffries, while the redevelopment took place. A development by Scripps Park Associates was built on the site of Jeffries West and named "Woodbridge Estates" at a cost of $92 million. Woodbridge Estates includes 281 mixed-income housing rental units, 101 owner-occupancy attached and detached single-family homes, a 100-unit senior housing apartment building, plus 297 units of senior housing in the three remaining towers of the former Jeffries West.

Jeffries East was demolished in 2008 and the site redeveloped as mixed-income complex named "Cornerstone," completed in late 2012 developed in three phases.. It included the development of 180 rental units in 30 buildings of townhomes and duplexes, consisting of 138 public housing units and 42 affordable housing rental units. Former residents of Jeffries East in good standing with the Detroit Housing Commission were permitted to return to the new complex.
