= Public housing in Detroit =

The following is a list of housing projects under the Detroit Housing Commission in the city of Detroit, Michigan, United States.

Tenement	Address	Contact
Brewster Homes	3526 St. Antoine, 48201	(313) 833-6924 (313) 833-6926
Cornerstone Estates	3200 John C. Lodge, 48201	(866) 416-9375 (866) 953-0395
Diggs Jr. Homes	1331 East Canfield, 48207	(313) 833-3590
Emerald Springs	5825 Emerald Springs Cr, 48212	(313) 366-1701
Gardenview Estates	16461 Van Buren Ave, 48228	(313) 582-9505
Harriet Tubman Apartments	2450 W. Grand Blvd., 48208	(313) 224-2576
John W. Smith Homes	14313 Crescent Dr, 48223	(313) 578-8015
Parkside Village II & IV	5000 Conner Ave., 48215	(313) 822-1477
Sojourner Truth Homes	4801 E. Nevada, 48234	(313) 852-5655
State Fair Apartments	1231 W. State Fair, 48203	(313) 852-4276

Senior Housing

Tenement	Address	Contact
Forest Park Apts.	1331 East Canfield, 48207	(313) 833-3590
Riverbend Towers	4386 Conner Ave., 48215	(313) 926-8702
Sheridan Apartments I & II	7501 & 7601 E. Jefferson, 48214	(313) 852-5736
Warren West Apartments	4100 W. Warren, 48210	(313) 224-4292
Woodbridge Senior Village	3511 John C. Lodge, 48201	(313) 831-4906
Woodbridge Senior Enhanced	1300 Martin Luther King Dr., 48201	(313) 494-9000

Public housing not under the Detroit Housing Commission

Tenement	Address	Contact
Colonel Hamtramck Homes	12025 Dequindre St, 48212	(313) 868-7445
Freedom Place	1101 W. Warren, 48201	(313) 832-3060
Martin Luther King Jr. Homes	595 Chene St, 48207	(313) 567-9150
Research Park	5500 Trumbull St, 48208	(313) 872-2313
Robert III Apartments	3901 Grand River, 48208	(313) 883-2322

== Demolished buildings ==
Tenement	Address	Notes
Brewster-Douglass	2700 St. Antoine, 48201	Residents moved to Brewster Homes. Completely demolished, awaiting redevelopment.
Charles Terrace	5512 Buffalo Court, 48212	Now home to Emerald Springs.
Herman Gardens	17116 Joy Rd., 48228	Now home to Gardenview Estates.
Jeffries Homes	3511 John C. Lodge, 48201	Now home to Woodbridge Senior Village.
Jeffries East	3241 John C. Lodge, 48201	Now home to Cornerstone Estates.
