= 1967 riots =

1967 riots may refer to:

- Long, hot summer of 1967, marked by race riots and civil disorder throughout the United States
  - 1967 riots in Avondale, Cincinnati, June 12–18, Cincinnati, Ohio
  - 1967 Buffalo riot, June 27–July 1, Buffalo, New York
  - 1967 Newark riots, July 12–17, Newark, New Jersey
  - 1967 Plainfield riots, July 14–21, Plainfield, Jersey
  - Cairo riot, July 17–20, Cairo, Illinois
  - 1967 Detroit riot, July 23–28, Detroit, Michigan
  - Cambridge riot of 1967, July 24, Cambridge, Maryland
  - 1967 Saginaw riot, July 26, Saginaw, Michigan
  - 1967 Milwaukee riot, July 30–August 3, Milwaukee, Wisconsin
  - 1967 Philadelphia student demonstration, November 17, Philadelphia, Pennsylvania
- 1967 Hong Kong riots, May–December, British Hong Kong
- 1967 anti-Chinese riots in Burma, June 26, 1967
