= 1967 Riviera Beach riot =

Civil rights disorder in Florida in 1967

- Part of Long, hot summer of 1967
- Date: July 30–31, 1967
- Location: Riviera Beach, Florida and West Palm Beach
- Caused by: James Mitchell's arrest; Accusations of police brutality towards Mitchell during his arrest; Racial inequality

Parties
Rioters	Florida Highway Patrol; Palm Beach County Sheriff's Office; Riviera Beach Police Department; West Palm Beach Police Department

Lead figures
	Sheriff of Palm Beach County; William Heidtman

Casualties
- Arrested: 45
- Damage: $350,000 (two warehouses)

The 1967 Riviera Beach riot was one of 159 riots during the Long, hot summer of 1967. It originated at the Blue Heron Bar in Riviera Beach, Florida and involved 400 rioters swarming the establishment. Forty-five people were arrested over the four hours it took to disperse the riot, including 14 teenagers in nearby West Palm Beach who were in possession of bomb-making materials.

== Riot ==
=== Background ===
Race riots and civil unrest were at a high in the 1960s, only climaxing in 1968 following the assassination of Martin Luther King Jr. on April 4. The summer of 1967 in particular saw more than 159 riots. Most, if not all, directly followed instances of police brutality, though the New York Times and similar publications labeled the rioters themselves as "terrorists." Like the rest of the country, Riviera Beach, Florida had started desegregating in the mid-1950s following Brown v. Board of Education and the building civil rights movement. The implementation, however, was slow-going.

While Riviera Beach itself was mostly Black, its police force was almost entirely composed of white officers. The day before the riot, Governor Claude R. Kirk Jr. appointed Republican William Heidtman as Sheriff of Palm Beach County. On the day of the riot, Riveria Beach dedicated two segregated recreational facilities in the area; Black residents, however, were still not allowed to visit nearby Singer Island. A predominantly white subdivision in Riveria Beach was surrounded by a wall, physically separating itself from nearby Black neighborhoods.

Footage of the riots

=== Incident ===
After a fight broke out at the Blue Heron Bar near the Port of Palm Beach on July 30, 1967, police arrested James Mitchell, a 27-year old Black man. The reason for his arrest was unclear. A rumor quickly spread among the onlookers that he had been abused by the police. The primarily Black bar patrons began taunting the police and followed them outside, where they began throwing rocks and bottles. Another rumor spread, this time alleging the police had assaulted innocent bystanders. More police arrived and began arresting people; when the local police became outnumbered, sheriff's deputies and state troopers were summoned for backup. At some point during the evening, Governor Kirk asked if local officials wanted him to impose a curfew, but they declined. One hundred and fifty-six National Guard soldiers were requested and remained on standby but were never used.

Over the course of four hours, 400 Riviera Beach residents, mostly Black, had joined the fray. Police tear gassed the crowd and arrested 45 people. Officers reportedly released Mitchell briefly to quash the violence and show that he had not been hurt. Fourteen teenagers were arrested in nearby West Palm Beach on charges of arson and possessing materials to create firebombs. Two warehouses owned by the Mullins Lumber Company caught fire, causing $350,000 in damage.

=== Aftermath ===
On July 31, the Riviera Beach City Council held a meeting to discuss the riots. Residents accused the police department of brutality and discriminatory traffic enforcement towards the local Black community. They cited poor housing conditions and lack of recreational facilities within their community as reasons for their discontent. Florida politicians blamed other figures, such as Fidel Castro, H. Rap Brown, and Stokley Carmichael. In Sheriff Heidtman's incident report, he blamed the news for saying riots would happen all over the country, and requested a sizable increase in the sheriff's department's riot-related budget at the council meeting. Walter Cronkite discussed the riot in Riviera Beach that evening.

Police dispersed a crowd gathering at Rosemary Avenue and Fourth Street in West Palm Beach on the evening of July 31. Liquor stores were boarded up and gun stores halted gun displays temporarily. The Mullins family, who owned the warehouses, sold them after receiving 20% of their insurance claim. Judge Russell H. McIntosh initially refused to lower bail until those arrested were charged and their backgrounds were investigated, but the appointed five-person bail committee, which included Edward Rodgers, the county's only Black judge, voted to reduce bail four days after the riot. Most of the 45 arrested were released. Police were applauded for their handling of the situation and concerns from the Black community were largely dismissed.

In the years following the riot, a federal jobs program was brought into the city and the first Black member of the School District of Palm Beach County was elected in 1970. By 1971, the City Council was mostly Black.
