= Buffalo riot =

Buffalo riot may refer to:

- Buffalo riot of 1862, an immigrant workers strike at Buffalo, New York
- Buffalo riot of 1967, a race riot at Buffalo, New York
