= Cairo riot =

Cairo riot may refer to

- Racial unrest in Cairo, Illinois
- 1977 Egyptian bread riots
- 1986 Egyptian conscripts riot
- 2011 Egyptian protests
- 2012–13 Egyptian protests
- June 2013 Egyptian protests
