= Long, hot summer of 1967 =

Race riots in the US in 1967

- Part of the Ghetto riots
- Film on the riots created by the White House Naval Photographic Unit
- Date: April–August 1967
- Location: United States
- Result: Kerner Commission established

Casualties
- Deaths: 85+
- Injuries: 2,100+
- Arrested: 11,000+

The long, hot summer of 1967 refers to an outbreak of widespread racial unrest across major American cities during the summer of 1967, where over 150 riots erupted, primarily fueled by deep-seated frustrations regarding police brutality, poverty, and racial inequality within black communities. The term emphasizes the intensity and widespread nature of the urban violence that summer.

The most destructive riots of the summer took place in July, in Detroit and Newark; many contemporary newspaper headlines described them as "battles". President Lyndon B. Johnson established the Kerner Commission to investigate the causes of the riots and address underlying societal issues.

== Riots ==
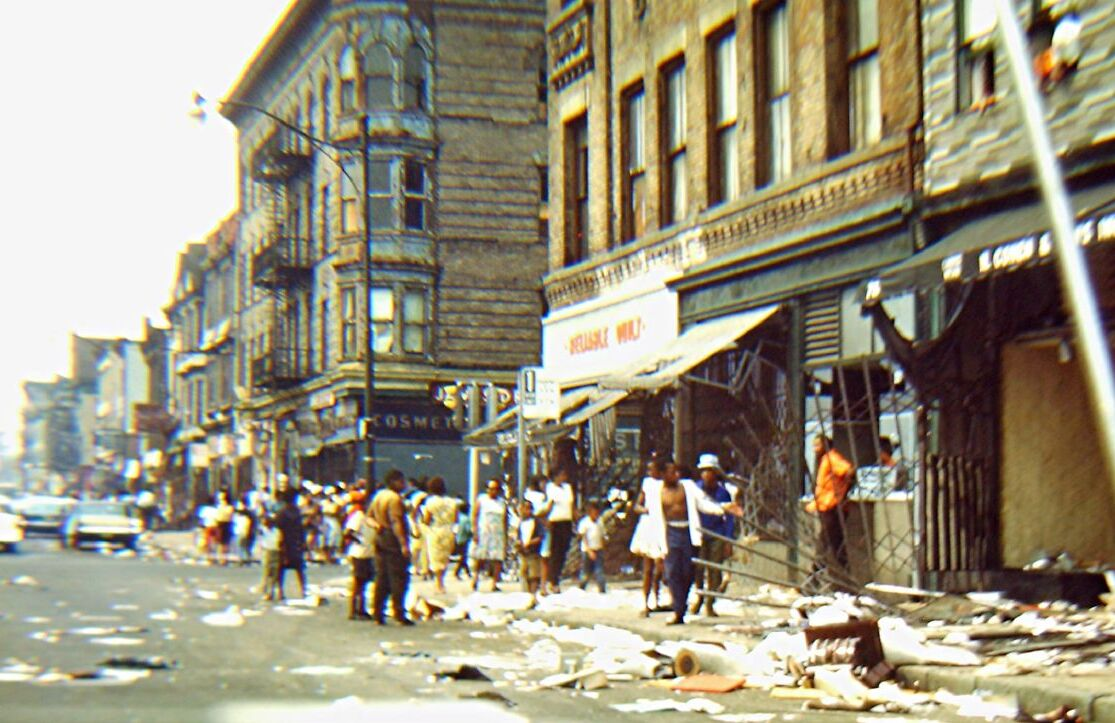
The streets of Newark, New Jersey, on July 14 during the 1967 riots

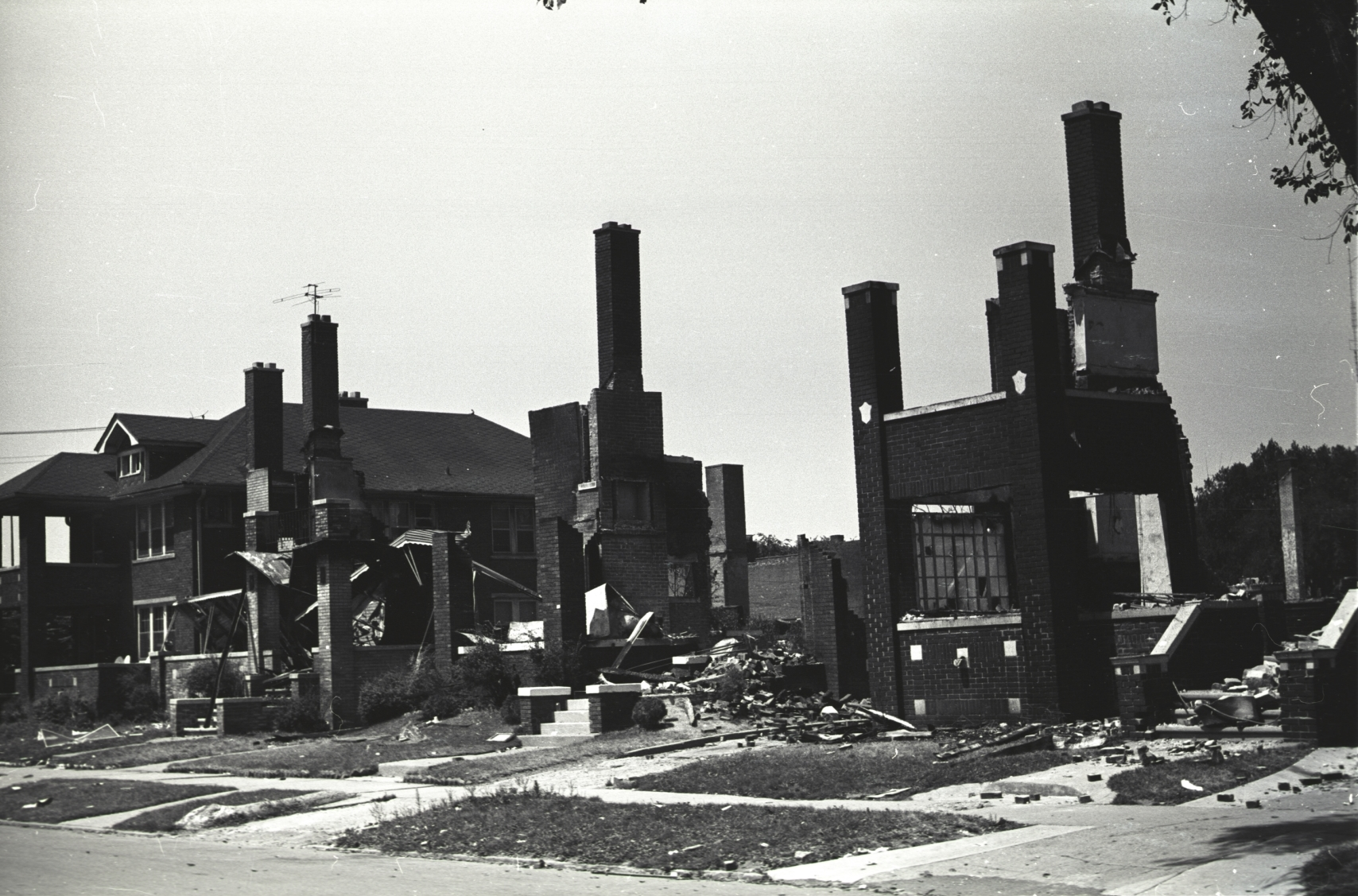
Destroyed buildings on July 24 during the 1967 Detroit riots

=== Background ===
The United States experienced a series of "long hot summers" of racial unrest during the mid-to-late 1960s. They started with the Harlem riots in July 1964, and the Watts riots in August 1965. During the first nine months of 1967, over 150 riots erupted across American cities. The most destructive riots were in Detroit, Michigan, and Newark, New Jersey. By September, 83 people were killed, thousands were injured, tens of millions of dollars' worth of property had been destroyed and entire neighborhoods had been burned.

Systemic racism, police brutality, high unemployment rates, poor living conditions in urban black neighborhoods, and a sense of hopelessness contributed to the widespread unrest. While significant civil rights legislation had been passed, many African Americans felt that the pace of change was too slow and the progress was not reflected in their daily lives.

=== Newark and Detroit ===
The Newark riots were sparked by the arrest and beating of John William Smith, a black cab driver, by police officers. The unrest lasted for five days, involving widespread looting, arson, and violent confrontations with police and National Guard troops. Some 26 people were killed, more than 700 were injured, and more than 1,000 residents were arrested. $10 million (equivalent to $96.56 million in 2025) in property was damaged, and destroyed multiple plots, several of which are still covered in decay as of 2017. The Boston Globe described the Newark riots as "a revolution of black Americans against white Americans, a violent petition for the redress of long-standing grievances." The Globe asserted that Great Society legislation had affected little fundamental improvement.

In Detroit, a large black middle class had begun to develop among those African Americans who worked at unionized jobs in the automotive industry. These workers complained of persisting racist practices, limiting the jobs they could have and opportunities for promotion. The United Auto Workers channeled these complaints into bureaucratic and ineffective grievance procedures. Violent white mobs enforced the segregation of housing up through the 1960s. The Detroit riots were sparked by a police raid on an unlicensed after-hours bar, commonly called a "Blind Pig", in a predominantly Black neighborhood. The riots lasted for five days, causing significant property damage, 1,200 injuries, and at least 43 deaths (33 of those killed were Black residents of the city). Governor George Romney sent in 7,400 National Guard troops to quell fire bombings, looting, and attacks on businesses and police. President Lyndon Johnson deployed U.S. Army troops with tanks and machine guns. Residents reported that police officers and National Guardsmen shot at black civilians and suspects indiscriminately.

At an August 2, 1967, cabinet meeting, Attorney General Ramsey Clark warned that untrained and undisciplined local police forces and National Guardsmen might trigger a "guerrilla war in the streets", as evidenced by the climate of sniper fire in Newark and Detroit. Snipers were a significant element in many of the riots, creating a dangerous situation for both law enforcement and civilians, with shooters often targeting from rooftops and other concealed locations.

== Reactions ==
It is in the context of having been through the "long, hot, summer" that, in December, Miami police chief Walter E. Headley uttered the now-infamous phrase, "When the looting starts, the shooting starts", after which Frank Rizzo, Richard Daley and George Wallace also spoke out in favor of a hardline approach towards looters and rioters.

In early July, the Justice Department met with local media to ask for "restraint in reporting". In December, The New York Times asked a psychologist about "deterrents" and was told that the riots would continue.

The FBI blamed the misery of ghetto life, oppressive summer weather, and Communist agitation. President Lyndon B. Johnson was convinced that inner-city poverty and despair were the principal ingredients behind the summer upheavals. Johnson publicly denounced the violence and looting occurring during the riots, calling on citizens to reject lawlessness and work towards peaceful solutions.

=== Political response ===
Throughout the summer that year, both the Republican and Democratic parties were split on how to handle the riots. In both parties two factions existed: one that advocated for law and order, and another that supported an approach based on social justice. Democrats held the majority of seats in both Houses of Congress while the Republicans held the minority. Despite common historiographical perceptions that depict the Republicans as being entirely in favor of a "law and order" styled approach to the riots, there was division in the party. President Johnson's popularity levels decreased that summer because of the riots.

During July, conservatives in the Republican Party dominated its response to the riots. Republicans believed this would be an opportunity to attack President Johnson and his War on Poverty initiative. Many Republicans would end up blaming Johnson for what happened that summer and many supported cutting back on programs that benefited urban areas. In the Senate, Republicans took a largely different approach that month than those who were in the House with most Republican Senators supporting Johnson's anti urban poverty programs.

In the 1968 presidential primaries, the Republican candidates split into two factions. Ronald Reagan aligned himself with the law and order faction; Nelson Rockefeller sided with the social justice faction; and Richard Nixon catered to both factions. Nixon emerged victorious. Nixon called for policies to control crime, scale back the war on poverty and encourage black capitalism as a way to "restore urban areas".

==== Kerner Commission ====
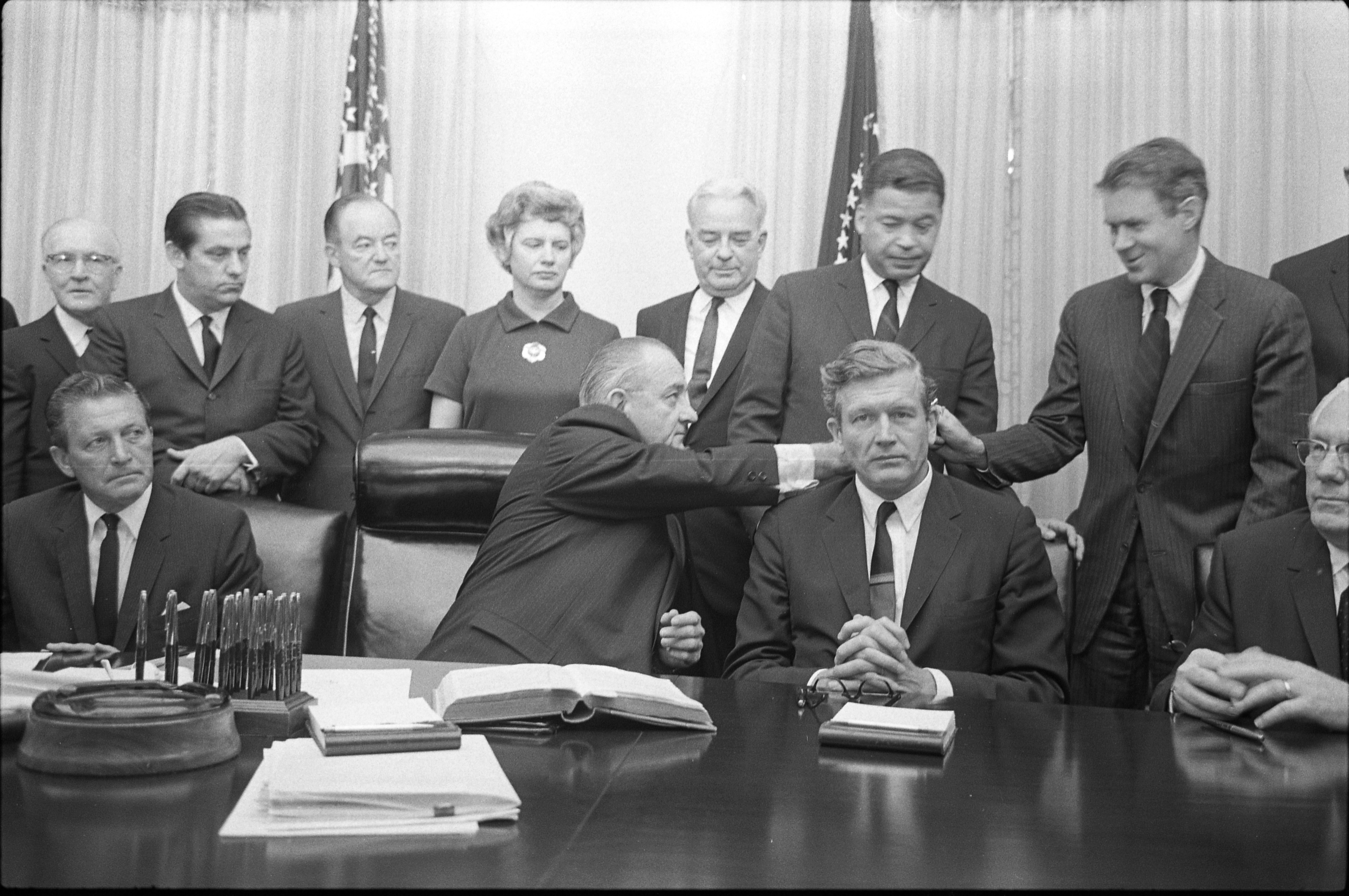
President Lyndon Johnson with some members of the Kerner Commission in the Cabinet Room of the White House

The riots confounded many civil rights activists of both races due to the recent passage of major civil rights legislation. They also caused a backlash among Northern whites, many of whom stopped supporting civil rights causes. President Johnson formed an advisory commission, informally known as the Kerner Commission, on July 28, 1967, to explore the causes behind the recurring outbreaks of urban civil disorder. The commission's scope included the 164 disorders occurring in the first nine months of 1967. The president had directed them, in simple words, to document what happened, find out why it happened, and find out how to prevent it.

The commission's 1968 report identified police practices, unemployment and underemployment, and lack of adequate housing as the most significant grievances motivating the rage. It suggested legislative measures to promote racial integration and alleviate poverty and concluded that the nation was "moving toward two societies, one black, one white—separate and unequal." The president, fixated on the Vietnam War and keenly aware of budgetary constraints, barely acknowledged the report.

On August 10, the Kerner Commission would recommend in a letter to President Johnson that they should substantially and immediately increase the amount of African Americans serving in the National Guard and Air National Guard. The reason being they thought with more African Americans serving in the National Guard it could be a more effective force at preventing civil disorder.

=== Polling ===
In a March 1968 Harris poll reported in The Washington Post, 37% of Americans agreed with the Kerner Commission's report that the 1967 race riots were brought on mainly by inequalities; 49% disagreed. A majority of whites (53%) rejected the idea, with just 35% agreeing. In contrast, 58% of blacks supported it, and only 17% disagreed.

== List of riots ==
Some of the riots include:

Location	Date	Deaths	Injured	Arrested	Notes
Omaha, NE	1. April 1	0		21	200 black youths damaged police cars and looted stores.
Nashville, TN	2. April 8–10	0	14+	100	Black college students from Tennessee State University rioted for 3 consecutive nights along Jefferson Street after Stokely Carmichael was denied to speak at the college campus.
Louisville, KY	3. April 11 - Mid-June	0		700	Black demonstrators protesting for open housing during segregation was harassed by white counter-protesters who threw rocks and bottles. During a visit by Martin Luther King Jr., 2,500 National Guardsmen protected the Kentucky Derby due to the possibility of a race riot.
Cleveland, OH	4. April 16	0			Black youths looted stores in Hough in Cleveland, which was also the location of previous rioting in 1966.
Massillon, OH	5. April 17	0		17	A fight broke out between black and white teenagers resulting in 17 arrests.
Wichita, KS	6. May 2–3	0			Black high school students fought against white students.
Jackson, MS	7. May 12	1	Several		Jackson State University student, Benjamin Brown was killed by 2 stray shotgun blasts by police into a crowd which was throwing rocks and bottles. National Guardsmen restored order after two nights of rioting near Jackson State University.
San Francisco, CA	8. May 14–15	0	14+	29+	500 black youths rioted at the amusement park Playland, which spilled out into Golden Gate Park and Haight-Ashbury.
Houston, TX	9. May 17	1		500	Rookie police officer, Louis Kuba, was killed during unrest on predominately-black college campus. Nearly 500 students were arrested.
Vallejo, CA	10. May 21	0			Black rioters stoned cars and snipers fought police after a drag race was broken up.
Chicago, IL	11. May 21	0	10	30	10 people, including 3 police officers were injured and 30 were arrested in a melee during a memorial service for Malcolm X.
Chicago, IL	12. May 30	0		37	37 were arrested after a race-related clash.
Boston, MA	13. June 2–5	0	100	73	A group of female welfare recipients started a sit-in at the Grove Hall Welfare Office at 515 Blue Hill Ave, resulting in a police response that angered the black population of Boston. The rioting spilled out along Blue Hill Ave for 4 days. The damage was estimated to be about 2 million in 1967 dollars (equivalent to $19,000,000 in 2025). The National Guard restored order soon afterwards.
Clearwater, FL	14. June 3	0		10	10 people were arrested after Black rioters attacked police for trying to break up a fight between 2 black men.
Tampa, FL	15. June 11–14	2		100+	After police shot black man, Martin Chambers, after he and 2 others robbed a photo warehouse, rioting spread throughout Tampa for 4 days. As a result, a black man and a white police officer were killed, more than 100 people were arrested, and damage was reported at 2 million dollars in 1967 dollars (equivalent to $19,000,000 in 2025).
Prattville, AL	16. June 11	0	4	10	The National Guard sent in after Black snipers opened fire on the police following the arrest of Stokely Carmichael.
Cincinnati, OH	17. June 12–19	1	63	404	In Avondale, black man Posteal Laskey Jr. was convicted as the Cincinnati Strangler. Protesters of the verdict turned violent and rioting spread throughout Reading Road, Burnett Avenue, and eventually Bond Hill, Winton Terrace, Walnut Hills, Corryville, Clifton, West End, and Downtown. As a result, 1 person was dead, 63 were injured, and 404 were arrested, and damages totaled 3 million dollars (equivalent to $29,000,000 in 2025). It took 1000 National Guardsmen to quell the unrest.
Montgomery, AL	18. June 12	0			National Guardsmen turned back black protesters against the jailing of Stokely Carmichael in nearby Prattville, who were marching on the State Capitol.
Los Angeles, CA	19. June 13	0			Stones and bottles were thrown at firemen in and near the Watts area (which was also the scene of a riot in 1965) while attempting to put out a fire that destroyed a small factory.
Philadelphia, PA	20. June 13	0	4+	25	25 people were arrested and 4 policemen hurt after rocks and bottles were thrown around a 12-block area due to a dispute over a rug.
Maywood, IL	21. June 14	0			Young black men and women rioted while demanding a swimming pool in a historically neglected area.
Dayton, OH	22. June 14–17	0			Black gangs started smashing windows, setting fires, and looting after a speech by H. Rap Brown, head of Student Nonviolent Coordinating Committee.
Middletown, OH	23. June 14	0		4	Four black youths were arrested after youths threw rocks at cars, stores, and homes.
Lansing, MI	24. June 16	0	3	2	Three people were injured and two people were arrested as black gangs hurled rocks and bottles at police.
Atlanta, GA	25. June 17–20	1	22	13	Four days of disorder began after a fight ensued between a black male and a black security guard who would not let him in the Flamingo Grill located at the Dixie Hills Shopping Center.
Roanoke, VA	26. June 23	0	Several	9	A near-riot in a predominately black business neighborhood injured several and nine were arrested.
Buffalo, NY	27. June 26 - July 1	0	100	200	Groups of black teenagers started looting along William Street and Jefferson Avenue. While it was broken up that night, on the next day, arson, looting, and vandalism broke out. About 100 people were injured and 200 were arrested. Damage was estimated at $250,000 (equivalent to $2,400,000 in 2025).
Cincinnati, OH	28. July 3–5	0			One of 3 race-related riots that took place in 1967 in Cincinnati.
Los Angeles, CA	29. July 6	0			More rock and bottle throwing erupted in Watts.
Des Moines, IA	30. July 9–10	0		6	Black gangs threw rocks and bottles resulting in six arrested.
Kansas City, MO	31. July 9	0	1	11	1 was injured and 11 were arrested after tear gas was dispersed on black looters who broke windows and attacked police cars.
Waterloo, IA	32. July 9–10	0	5		5 were injured in two nights of minor disturbances where African-Americans stoned passing cars and looted stores.
Newark, NJ	33. July 12–16	26	727	1465	26 were killed, 727 were injured, and 1,465 were arrested in Newark after false rumors of a black man being killed by police. In an attempt to contain the violence, the bridges along the Passaic River were closed every night and nearly 8,000 state police and National Guardsmen were deployed in Newark.
Plainfield, NJ	34. July 14–16	1		150	Spillover from Newark riots. In Plainfield, black rioters looted 90 stores and kicked/shot a white policeman to death. After an arms factory was broken into nearby Middlesex, New Jersey, National Guardsmen were also deployed in Plainfield.
Irvington, NJ	35. ~July 14	0			Spillover from Newark riots.
Orange, NJ	36. ~July 14	0			Spillover from Newark riots.
East Orange, NJ	37. ~July 14	0			Spillover from Newark riots.
Montclair, NJ	38. ~July 14	0			Spillover from Newark riots.
Asbury Park, NJ	39. ~July 14	0			Spillover from Newark riots.
New Brunswick, NJ	40. ~July 14	0			Spillover from Newark riots.
Elizabeth, NJ	41. ~July 14	0			Spillover from Newark riots.
Paterson, NJ	42. ~July 14	0			Spillover from Newark riots.
Jersey City, NJ	43. ~July 14	0			Spillover from Newark riots. In Jersey City, the violence ended quickly after the mayor took a tough stand.
Hartford, CT	44. July 14	0	11+	20	After a black teenager was arrested for swearing at a waitress, black gangs started rioting by throwing bricks and firebombs, resulting in 11 policemen being injured and 20 arrested.
Erie, PA	45. July 14	0			One of 3 outbursts of arson and brick-throwing in Erie.
Des Moines, IA	46. July 16	0			Recurring violence in Des Moines.
Fresno, CA	47. July 16	0	1		An anti-poverty worker was wounded by a gunfight. Firebombing caused 23 fires.
Greenwood, NC	48. July 17	0			Black and white rioters fought with rocks after five whites were charged with terrorizing a black minister in his home.
Cairo, IL	49. July 17–21	0			After the jailhouse suicide of Robert Hunt, 9 firebombings took place and threats of violence were sent.
Erie, PA	50. July 18	0			One of 3 outbursts of arson and brick-throwing in Erie.
Nyack, NY	51. July 19	0		18	Violence spread from Newark to New York when dozens of black youths ran through Nyack, taunting police, and breaking the windows of homes and businesses. Police marched in a phalanx through the streets to break up bands of black marauders.
Minneapolis, MN	52. July 19–24	0	24	36	After an alleged plot set up by Black Panther Party leader, Stokely Carmichael or/and the shooting of a black shoplifter by a Jewish business owner, violence erupted along Plymouth Avenue. 600 National Guardsmen were deployed to quell the outbreak of violence. Total damage was about 4.2 million dollars (equivalent to $40,600,000 in 2025).
Durham, NC	53. July 19	0	3		National Guardsmen watched over predominately black protesters. Two blacks were injured by gunshot by a passing car, windows were broken, and bricks were tossed at motorists by black and white rioters.
Lakeland, FL	54. July 20	0			Black youths threw fire bombs into white-owned grocery stores.
Bridgeton, NJ	55. July 21	0			Windows were broken by black rioters following the arrest of a black man.
Hattiesburg, MS	56. July 22	0		27	27 black protesters were arrested for disturbing the peace in a boycott of stores.
Wadesboro, NC	57. July 22	0	1+		After a black person was shot and run over by a car, black rioters went on a rock-throwing rampage.
Youngstown, OH	58. July 22	0			Violence involving blacks and whites resulted in 2 buildings being blown up by dynamite. Police and firemen were harassed by rioters.
Englewood, NJ	59. July 22–24	0			3 nights of violence erupted in Englewood. At one point, 100 policemen were pinned down by snipers.
Houston, TX	60. July 23	0			Blacks gangs roamed through the streets and set three fires with fire bombs.
Detroit, MI	61. July 23–28	43	1189	7231	Nearly 1,200 people were injured and over 7,200 people arrested, many of them being the estimated 10,000 rioters who ravaged the city. The casualties and damages were the highest since the New York City draft riots or the Tulsa race massacre depending on what sources were compared. 2,509 buildings reported looting or damage while 412 buildings were burnt down or damaged enough that they had to be torn down. While news reports put costs from damage in the hundreds of millions, investigations have put estimates of property damage costs at 40 (equivalent to $386,000,000 in 2025) to 45 million (equivalent to $435,000,000 in 2025).
Grand Rapids, MI	62. July 23–25	0	44	350	Spillover from Detroit riot. The riot area was bounded by Wealthy Street on the north, Division Avenue on the west, Lafayette Avenue on the east, and Hall Street on the south. National Guardsmen and State police were deployed as arson and looting went on for several days.
Pontiac, MI	63. ~July 23	2		25	Spillover from Detroit riot. Two blacks were killed, one by a State legislator protecting his store. 25 rioters were arrested, 40 fires were set, and gun shops were looted.
Flint, MI	64. ~July 23	0			Spillover from Detroit riot.
Kalamazoo, MI	65. ~July 23	0			Spillover from Detroit riot.
Mount Clemens, MI	66. ~July 23	0			Spillover from Detroit riot.
Muskegon, MI	67. ~July 23	0			Spillover from Detroit riot.
Benton Harbor, MI	68. ~July 23	0			Spillover from Detroit riot.
Albion, MI	69. ~July 23	0			Spillover from Detroit riot.
New York City, NY	70. July 23–30	4	29+	32+	Following the shooting of a Puerto Rican by a police officer, unrest erupted in Spanish Harlem along Third Ave between 109th and 126th Streets, South Bronx, and Bedford–Stuyvesant, resulting in the deaths of 4 Puerto Ricans.
Toledo, OH	71. July 23–25	0	50+	180	Inspired by the Detroit riots, groups of black youths started looting stores. The rampage caused the National Guard to be deployed with orders to shoot to kill.
Birmingham, AL	72. July 23	0	11	70+	National Guardsmen helped police quell rioting. 11 were injured and more than 70 rioters were arrested.
New Britain, CT	73. July 23	0			Police sealed in a black neighborhood after an attack on a white motorist.
Rochester, NY	74. July 23–24	2			Violence erupted as white and black gangs raided each other's neighborhood, resulting in $60,000 damage (equivalent to $580,000 in 2025) and 2 blacks killed.
Tucson, AZ	75. July 23–24	0			Black rioters fought police for two nights in Tucson.
Lima, OH	76. July 23	0		21	Police arrested 21 black youths after being caught breaking the windows of stores.
Waukegan, IL	77. July 23–25	0			Police from neighboring cities came to Waukegan to help quell two days of vandalism.
Cambridge, MD	78. July 24	0			After a police officer's shotgun was fired without warning, a pellet ricocheted and hit SNCC leader "Rap" Brown. National Guardsmen were sent in after a night of rioting and shooting in which 17 buildings were destroyed by fire.
Saginaw, MI	79. July 26	0	7	50	Spillover from Detroit riot.
Phoenix, AZ	80. July 26	0			2 days after the rioting in Tucson ended, it erupted again in Phoenix.
Mount Vernon, NY	81. July 26	0			Looting erupted around South Seventh Avenue and West Third Street and a state of emergency was declared by mayor Joseph P. Vaccarella.
South Bend, IN	82. July 26	0			1000 National Guardsmen was sent into South Bend after roving black gangs in the western section of the city caused unrest.
Marin City, CA	83. July 26	0	3		Black rioters set fires and shot at firemen. Three people were wounded during the unrest.
Sacramento, CA	84. July 26–27	0			Stores were vandalized and hit by arson. A school was also hit by arson.
San Francisco, CA	85. July 27–28	0			Two nights of hit-and-run violence of blacks shooting at white youths.
Cincinnati, OH	86. July 27	0			One of three race-related riots that took place in 1967 in Cincinnati.
Philadelphia, PA	87. July 27	0			The mayor declared a state of "limited emergency" after vandalism erupted in Philadelphia.
Alton, IL	88. July 27	0			Supermarkets were vandalized as a cab driver was wounded and two police cars were hit by buckshot by a black gang.
New Rochelle, NY	89. July 27	0			Black youths returning from a community-action program threw rocks and broke 3 store windows.
Lorain, OH	90. July 27	0			National Guardsmen were sent in to quell vandalism and arson.
Albany, NY	91. July 27	0			Vandalism spreads to upstate New York.
Poughkeepsie, NY	92. July 27	0			Vandalism spreads to upstate New York.
Peekskill, NY	93. July 27	0			Vandalism spreads to upstate New York.
East St. Louis, IL	94. July 27–28	0		23	23 people were arrested after two nights of window-smashing and arson.
Passaic, NJ	95. July 27	0			Vandalism spreads throughout New Jersey.
Waterbury, CT	96. July 27	0	11+		At least 11 people were injured and 2 were shot in an outburst of rock-throwing and looting. Police used tear gas to quell the unrest.
Seattle, WA	97. July 27	0			Vandals and rioters set at least one fire and tossed rocks and bottles.
Memphis, TN	98. July 27	0			Violence subsided quickly after the National Guard was deployed in Memphis.
Springfield, OH	99. July 27	0		5	Five people were arrested after a wave of rock-throwing and arson.
New Castle, PA	100. July 28–30	0			Roving bands of black teen-agers threw fire bombs, smashed windows with rocks.
Pasadena, CA	101. Late July	0			Violence hit suburbs of Los Angeles in late July, resulting in the police using a new aerosol tear-gas gun called the Chemical Mace.
Long Beach, CA	102. Late July	0			Violence hit suburbs of Los Angeles in late July, resulting in the police using a new aerosol tear-gas gun called the Chemical Mace.
Wilmington, DE	103. July 28–29	0	13	325	City council passed riot-control measures as black gangs rampaged Wilmington.
Newburgh, NY	104. July 29	0			A Neo-Nazi rally resulted in fighting between black rioters and the National Renaissance Party, store windows broken, police cars broken, and 30 blacks arrested. Police were also helped in controlling crowd by using the Chemical Mace.
Elgin, IL	105. July 29	0			Police sealed off five blocks of downtown Elgin after black gangs began setting fires, arson, and throwing bricks and bottles.
Rockford, IL	106. July 29–30	0	11	44	Two nights of rioting resulted in 11 injuries and 44 arrests.
Portland, OR	107. July 30	0		115	A civil rights protest grew violent after a member of the Black Panther Party did not show up. National Guard was put on alert as the rioters roamed through 30 square blocks of the city throwing rocks and smashing store windows.
Rivera Beach, FL	108. July 30–31	0		45	After a black man was arrested for a fight at a bar, rumors spread that a black man was beaten by police, resulting in 2 days of rioting. Police fired tear gas to break up a rampage of black rioters, while National Guardsmen were called up, but not used.
East Palo Alto, CA	109. July 30–31	0			Rocks and bottles were thrown until a patrol of black volunteers calmed the situation.
Milwaukee, WI	110. July 30 - August 3	4	100	1740	After police broke up a fight between 2 black women, objects were thrown at them and grew into 5 days of rioting, resulting in 4 dead, 100 injured, and 1740 arrested.
Wichita, KS	111. July 31	0			Black rioters fire-bombed two stores and stoned police and motorists.
Erie, PA	112. July 31	0			One of 3 outbursts of arson and brick-throwing in Erie.
West Palm Beach, FL	113. July 31	0		46	Tear gas was used to break up a mob of approximately 400 blacks. A fire that led to damages of about $350,000 (equivalent to $3,400,000 in 2025) led to the arrest of 46 people under Florida's new tough antiriot law.
Denver, CO	114. July 31	0		12	A dozen youths were arrested after a mob of about 100 blacks bombarded police with rocks and bottles after breaking shop windows.
Providence, RI	115. July 31 - August 1	0	23	14	A 35-block area in the southern, predominately black, area of Providence were sealed after black youths went on a rampage. Riot squads battled snipers and routed rival gangs of whites and Negroes in two days of violence.
San Bernardino, CA	116. July 31 - August 4	0	2	67	Violence hit suburbs of Los Angeles in late July, resulting in the police using a new aerosol tear-gas gun called the Chemical Mace. Unrest began after a crowd of 300 people at a house party were blocking the street which the police broke up.
Washington D.C.	117. August 1	0			The nation's capital appeared heading for a riot when bands of black youths went on a midnight rampage, smashing dozens of store windows along H Street NE and setting a dozen small fires after a rock concert at the old Washington Coliseum. Police, moving in quickly but quietly, restored order before dawn.
Wyandanch, NY	118. August 1 -	0			In business districts of Wyandanch, smashed windows of 3 stores, overturned 2 cars, hurled stones at police, set fires to the auditorium of the (now named) Martin Luther King Jr. Elementary School on Mount Avenue, the Wyandanch VFW Hall, and the ambulance garage at South 20th Street and Straight Path throughout several nights of violence.
Sandusky, OH	119. August 2	0			Black teenagers smashed windows and arsoned two shopping centers after a black home was fire-bombed and several other black homes vandalized by four whites.
Peoria, IL	120 August 2–3	0	4	7	Police sealed off an open housing project for blacks after snipers fired at police directing traffic around a fire started by a fire bomb. Started after arsonists had set a grocery store on fire.
Wichita, KS	121. August 4	0			Black protesters marching on police station and courthouse renewed racial violence in Wichita.
Houston, TX	122. August 15–17	0		6	Unrest began in Houston after a white male service station attendant shot a black male in an attempted robbery. Snipping and vandalism were reported to have happened.
Syracuse, NY	123. August 16–20	0		186	Syracuse would see civil unrest after a case of police brutality toward an African American man on August 15. Property damages were estimated to be $66,000 (equivalent to $640,000 in 2025).
New Haven, CT	124. August 19–23	0	3	679	Rioting began in New Haven after a Puerto Rican man had approached a restaurant owner with a knife and the restaurant owner shot him. 200 state troopers were called in as reinforcements for the riots and ended up lasting for four days. Most arrests occurred for violating a curfew that lasted for several days. Interference with firefighting was reported and so were 90 cases of arson. About $149,000 (equivalent to $1,440,000 in 2025) in property damage was caused.

== See also ==
- United States racial unrest (2020–2023)
- Ferguson unrest
- George Floyd protests
- King assassination riots
- List of incidents of civil unrest in the United States
- Red Summer
