= 1967 Atlanta riots =

Atlanta Race Riots

- Part of Long, hot summer of 1967
- Date: June 17 – 20, 1967
- Location: Atlanta, Georgia
- Caused by: A fight breaking out at a shopping center.

Parties
Protesters, rioters	Atlanta; Atlanta Police Department

Casualties
- Death: 1
- Injuries: 22
- Arrested: 13

The 1967 Atlanta riots were one of many riots during the Long, hot summer of 1967 lasting from June 17, 1967, to June 20. The riots started after a black male who was holding a beer can was denied from entering the Flamingo Grill by a security guard there at the Dixie Hills Shopping Center and a fight started afterwards.

== Background ==
Prior to the riots, the Kerner Report described the city as being racially progressive but tense. Despite the city being racially progressive, there were strong segregationist elements in the city as well. The city had experienced significant growth after World War II through industrialization and annexations along with the city's non white population growing. By the time of the riots, 44% of the city was non-white.

=== Statistical background ===
Disparities were seen between non-white residents in the city through housing, income and education. The median income for non-white families in the city was less than half that of white families. In Atlanta, there were about 25,000 unfilled job positions because of a lack of education and skills to get potential applicants. Non whites in Atlanta had less education on average than whites did in the city. Many homes in the city where non-white residents lived at were in bad condition.

=== Summerhill Riot ===
On September 6, 1966, a black man who was arrested in connection to stealing a car was shot and wounded by a detective. Afterwards, a riot known as the Summerhill Riot or the Atlanta Rebellion broke out and lasted until September 12.

=== Civil Rights Movement actions ===
Atlanta pursued a strategy that was considered moderate when it came to desegregation during the Civil Rights Movement. It considered keeping the peace and moderation as the highest priorities while considering actual integration secondarily. Martin Luther King collaborated with Atlanta mayors William Hartsfield and Ivan Allen Jr. to achieve this. Golf courses were desegregated in 1955, while the city's buses got desegregated in 1959 after a 2 year long bus boycott had happened. In 1964, only 1 out of every 10 restaurants in the city was desegregated. While for hotels/motels, it was even less prevalent with only 3 out of every 150 being desegregated.

== Riots ==
At roughly just after 9 PM local time on June 17, a black male by the name of "E.W." attempted to enter the Flamingo Grill located at the Dixie Hills Shopping Center. A black security guard at the grill denied him entrance for unclear reasons and a fight broke out between the two. 200 to 300 people were drawn in and eventually the guard called in the police with three arrests being made. The mall was closed the following day. Local residents decided to get to work on organizing committees and hold a protest meeting the next night.

During June 18, an African American man banged on an alarm with a broom leading to it short circuiting. When officers who responded to what happened came, they asked him to stop but he did not. As a result, a fight broke out between him and the officers with a crowd of onlookers forming. The onlookers joined into the fight. At one point, an officer fired his revolver towards the crowd and shot someone giving them minor wounds. During the evening, a meeting was held with 250 attendees. African-American leaders were urged to voice their grievances through legal channels but received a moderate response from the crowd. Stokeley Carmichael arrived and gave a rousing speech that electrified the audience. The crowd grew to over 1,000 throwing rocks and bottles at police cars along with breaking car windows. The police easily became aware of what was happening. The police heard the sounds of firecrackers going off and thought they were being fired upon. 9 police officers were injured and they called 60-70 officers for backup and fired their weapons above the crowd. The police arrested 10 people in the end.

On June 20, a meeting was held in the area. At the end of the meeting, 200 protesters were confronted with 300 police officers. An explosive device was flung near the officers causing the area to catch on fire. The police fired into the crowd with one person being killed and another injured. Community workers tried to prevent any future violence by going to the area along with mayor Ivan Allen Jr. in an attempt to lower tensions. H. Rap Brown tried to start another protest but his attempt failed.
