= Lynching of William "Froggie" James =

African-American man lynched in southern Illinois

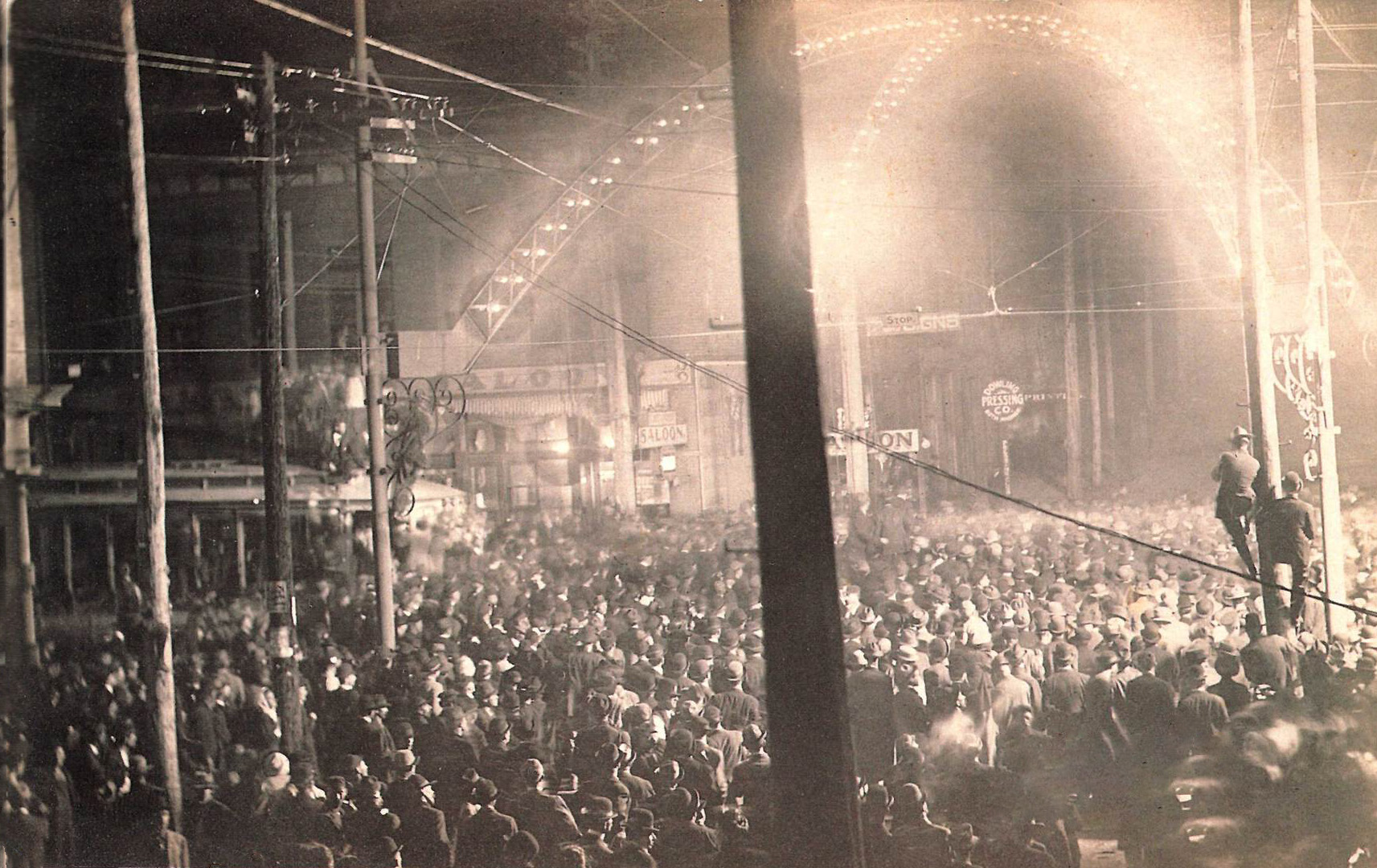
- The lynching of James on November 11, 1909
- Date: November 11, 1909
- Location: Cairo, Illinois, United States
- Participants: Residents of Cairo, Illinois
- Deaths: 2 (William James and Henry Salzner)

William "Froggie" James, an African-American man, was lynched and mutilated on November 11, 1909, by a mob in Cairo, Illinois after he was charged with the rape and murder of 23-year-old shop clerk Anna Pelley.

James was denied due process and killed before the police investigation had been completed. The townspeople of Cairo formed a mob and murdered him. A white prisoner, Henry Salzner, was also murdered by the mob. He was charged with the murder of his wife. The lynching of James drew crowds of thousands, and led the Illinois State Legislature to pass a series of anti-lynch and anti-mob laws that led to major reforms throughout the Midwest involving the sentencing and protections for African American people in Illinois. His lynching also mobilized advocacy groups in the state to push for more legal protections of African-American communities in smaller towns.

== Background ==
=== Anti-lynching legislation ===
Years before James's lynching, the Illinois State Legislature implemented a series of anti-lynching laws to curb the racial tensions that had been brewing throughout the state. In 1901 alone, there were 135 lynchings in Illinois. Anti-lynching bureaus formed to assemble political capital to pass anti-lynching laws. While anti-lynching proponents met considerable resistance, civil rights leaders in Chicago, such as Ida B. Wells, gained significant ground in drafting anti-lynching laws. These leaders were able to gain the support of Illinois governor Charles Deneen, who was imperative in drafting the 1905 anti-lynch laws passed in Illinois. Deneen gained support from Black voters, who saw him as being on their side. While most of the state supported lynching laws, smaller towns did not. Lynching was seen as a sort of "peoples' justice", as river towns became increasingly embroiled in vice-related activity. The laws were laxly enforced in areas where lynchings ran rampant. Police were overwhelmed with regulating the influx of organized crime, mostly revolving around prostitution and smuggling of alcohol. Mob action took precedence when police action failed to keep pace with the sentiments of the community.

== Events ==
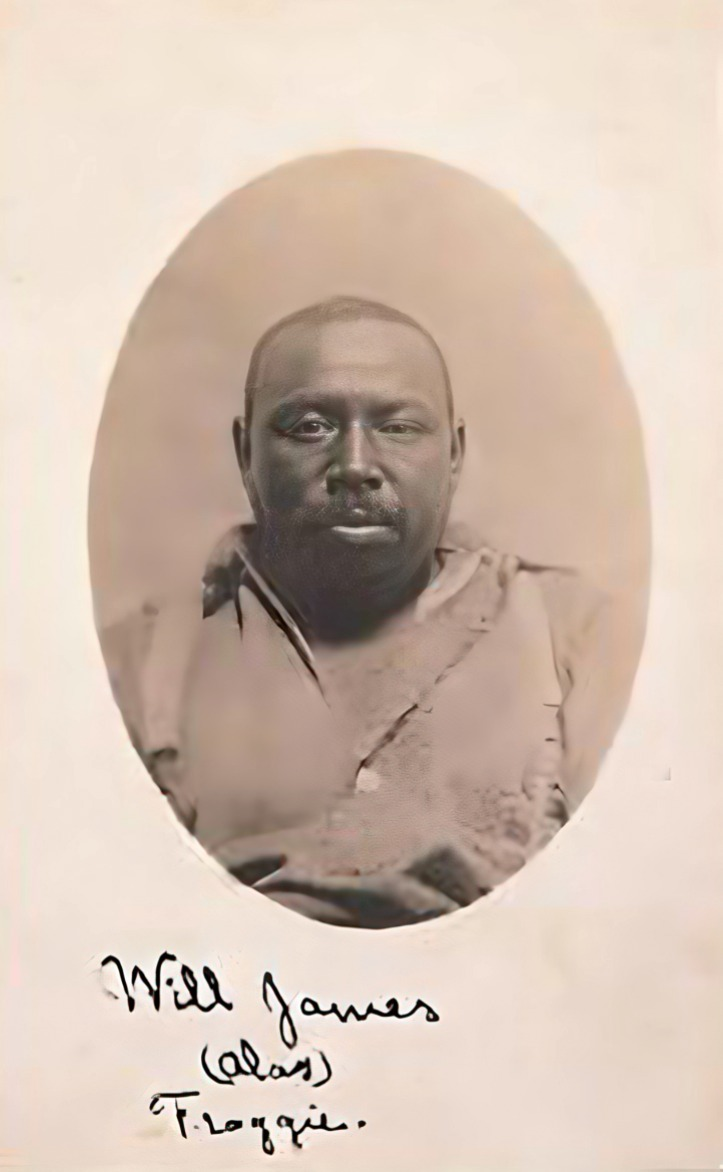
William James pictured

Stacy McDermott's 1999 article "'An Outrageous Proceeding': A Northern Lynching and the Enforcement of Anti-Lynching Legislation in Illinois, 1905–1910" analyzes the events leading to James's final moments. Pelley's twisted and bruised dead body was found gagged with a cloth in an alley on the morning of November 9. The police chief sent for bloodhounds and used them that day. The dogs led authorities to arrest five people: James, Arthur Alexander, Sam Mosby, Georgia Cooper, and another woman identified only by the surname Green. James and Alexander were the primary suspects.

"James had no alibi for the hour between five and six o'clock on November 8, the time which the coroner's jury thought the murder to have taken place. The flour sack that Green had allegedly been washing upon her arrest matched the gag found in Pelley's mouth. Cooper's alleged statement that she washed James's bloodstained clothes on the night of the murder and James's muscular build added to the limited evidence."

— "'An Outrageous Proceeding': A Northern Lynching and the Enforcement of Anti-Lynching Legislation in Illinois, 1905–1910"

Mobs began to form across the river, and citizens started to "investigate" the crime scene and James's home. The mob began to carry out its own "investigation" of James, since the police force did not align with the mob's desired time frame. Hearing plans of the assembling mobs, the police began to increase security by the jailhouse, and even dismissed several groups of would-be citizen investigators from the crime scene. While the security was effective in keeping the jailhouse secure, the history of social disorder suggested that the mob was only gaining strength and would eventually overpower the guards.

Alexander County Sheriff Frank E. Davis and Deputy Thomas Fuller attempted to keep the detainees in the jailhouse safe from the impending invasion. Knowing the mob was targeting James, the two officers took him into the woods on the night of the 9th as the mob began to plan their attack on the town. To avoid the even further inflamed racial tensions in nearby towns, the three stayed in Karnak, Illinois, about 27 miles north of Cairo. Hearing of the officers and James fleeing, 300 men from Cairo boarded a freight train to Karnak. The trio were quickly found and offered little resistance to the mob. The officers were disarmed and the mob kidnapped James.

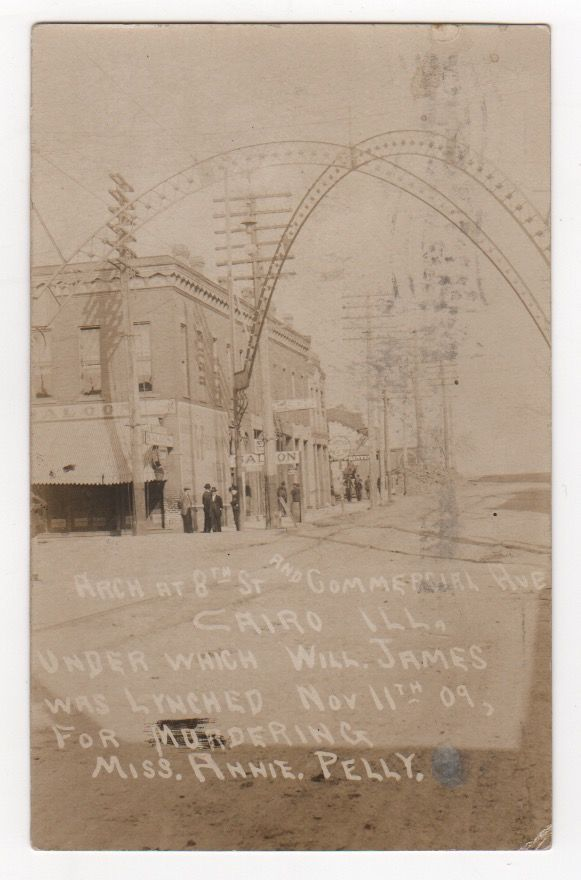
A postcard showing the location where a mob attempted to hang William James from a steel arch

The next day, James, accompanied by the mob, arrived to a waiting crowd of hundreds at the Cairo train depot. James was then taken to Downtown Cairo. Around 10,000 people were present. McDermott describes his final moments:

The enraged and exhilarated mob tied the noose around James's neck, intending to hang him from a steel arch in the well-lit street. Then the mob hoisted up the rope to hang him, demanding that he confess his crime. James allegedly shouted his confession and implicated Arthur Alexander as his accomplice. The judges, jury, and executioners lifted the rope to avenge the dead woman, but the rope broke and threw James roughly to the ground. As he stood, several people in the crowd riddled his body with approximately five hundred bullets. William James was dead. [...] The mob ran with his bleeding body to the murder scene in the alley. One man chopped off James's head, put it on a pike, and lifted it up for the cheering crowd to see. The mob then set James's body on fire and roasted the remains while men, women, and children shouted and cheered. When the fire died out, the horror continued as people moved in to dismember the body. Some took out their pocketknives and cut off ears and fingers and broke up bones to take as gruesome souvenirs.

— "'An Outrageous Proceeding': A Northern Lynching and the Enforcement of Anti-Lynching Legislation in Illinois, 1905–1910"

=== Henry Salzner ===
After James was dead, the mob returned to the jail and kidnapped Henry August Salzner (1879-1909), a white photographer who was charged with murdering his wife with an axe. Salzner was scheduled to go on trial later that month, but the mob decided to murder him first. Salzner was lynched and shot in the public square. After the second lynching, shouting matches and minor looting gripped Cairo until the next morning when the Illinois National Guard implemented martial law and restored order in the town.

== Impact ==
In the aftermath of the event, many prominent figures and groups denounced the murders. Governor Deneen responded to the Cairo lynchings by calling the mob violence "an outrageous proceeding and a disgrace to the state of Illinois." He relieved Sheriff Davis and Deputy Fuller of their positions. The recently founded National Association for the Advancement of Colored People (NAACP) was the first advocacy group to use James's case as an example of the ineffectiveness of anti-lynching laws. The group sent civil rights activist Ida B. Wells from Chicago to Cairo when Davis was applying for reinstatement. Wells's presence caused a rift in the Cairo Black community, mostly because of the conflict of allegiances tied with Davis. Davis hired Black men to his police force, and the Black community respected him for granting their homes and families a relative safety not often afforded to other small river town Black communities. Members of the Black community also believed that James had committed the murder, and saw him mostly as a "worthless sort of fellow". Nevertheless, Wells continued her campaign to prevent the reinstatement, arguing that if Davis were to remain in his position, it would set a negative precedent for other towns to condone these kinds of attacks. Davis was not reinstated, and Deneen passed an order mandating that presiding officers be relieved of their job if they failed to protect their prisoners. These laws effectively ended mob lynchings in Illinois.

=== In popular culture ===
The television series American Gods, set partly in Cairo, depicts the lynching of James in its episode "The Ways of the Dead" in its second season.

== See also ==
- List of lynchings and other homicides in Illinois
- List of lynching victims in the United States
- Racial unrest in Cairo, Illinois
