= 1967 Toledo riot =

US riot part of national racial unrest

1967 Toledo Riot
- Part of the Long hot summer of 1967
- Date: July 23–25, 1967
- Location: Toledo, Ohio, U.S.
- Methods: Rioting

Parties
Toledo Police Department	African-American community members and protesters

Casualties
- Injuries: 50+
- Arrested: 180

The 1967 Toledo riot was one of 159 race riots that swept cities in the United States during the "Long Hot Summer of 1967".

The riot occurred in Toledo, Ohio, beginning on July 23, 1967. Tensions were high across the midwest that week as the 1967 Detroit riots in nearby Detroit had been escalating since Sunday July 23. The first glass was broken in Toledo on Monday, the day after the unrest began in Detroit. It was mostly the work of roving gangs of kids, likely inspired by the images they were seeing on TV coming from the Motor City. They began their copycat crime spree by walking the streets of several neighborhoods, breaking windows, looting stores and setting fires. A dozen fires were set the first night, many of them in the Dorr Street corridor between Detroit Avenue and City Park Avenue. There was also looting of stores in the downtown area at Monroe and 17th Streets and windows were smashed in the Miracle Mile Shopping Center in west Toledo.

As the night progressed, violence flared in numerous sections of the city. At Monroe and 10th Street, nine people were arrested with gasoline, bottles and rag wicks, the crude ingredients for firebombs. A fire bomb was believed to have caused a $10,000 fire at the Kellermeyer Chemical Company on Brown Avenue in central Toledo.

As the reports of fires and looting continued in the early hours of the morning, more Toledo police officers were called in to help quell the situation and even in the Toledo suburbs, of Oregon, Maumee and Sylvania, extra crews were summoned just in case their normally tranquil streets would become targets for the restless youth. In another preemptive move, Toledo Police and County Deputies camped out on the Michigan State border to stop any potential Detroit "rioters" from coming across the state line. Also on alert, and ready for deployment was the Ohio National Guard and they got their chance the next day when 500 guardsmen were mobilized and put on standby at the Secor Road Armory in the event that Toledo Police needed their assistance. A 9:00 pm curfew was placed on everyone under the age of 21 in the city by Mayor John Potter. Many stores and bars and taverns were also asked to close, while some Community Traction bus routes were shut down through some neighborhoods. After several motorists were attacked and seriously injured by rock and bottle throwing teens, police opted to block off some streets in area of known trouble spots. Tuesday and Wednesday brought more reports of looting and dozens of scattered disturbances around the city including the arrests of more than a dozen people caught with fire bomb materials and weapons.

When the city finally calmed down after five tense and turbulent days, police had made more than 180 arrests, and fire crews had responded to almost 80 arson fires.

== See also ==
- List of incidents of civil unrest in the United States
