= 1967 Saginaw riot =

Race riot in Michigan, United States

1967 Saginaw Riot
- Part of the Long hot summer of 1967
- Date: July 26th, 1967
- Location: Saginaw, Michigan, U.S.
- Caused by: Protesters turned away at City Hall and confronted by riot police
- Methods: Protests, Rioting, Looting, Vandalism, Arson, Shooting

Parties
Saginaw Police Department	African-American community members and protesters

Casualties
- Injuries: 7
- Arrested: 50

The 1967 Saginaw riot was one of 159 race riots that swept cities in the United States during the "Long Hot Summer of 1967". This riot occurred in Saginaw, Michigan, on July 26, 1967. Tensions were high across Michigan that week as the 1967 Detroit riots in nearby Detroit had been escalating since Sunday July 23. When Saginaw mayor Henry G. Marsh chose to only meet privately with Civil Rights leaders in a conference closed to members of the public, the public started a protest. The protestors were met by riot police at City Hall and began getting out of hand, eventually turning into a riot that spread through downtown and into the neighborhoods of Saginaw. In all, 7 people were injured, 5 of whom were civilians and 2 were police.

== See also ==
- List of incidents of civil unrest in the United States
