= 1967 Cambridge riot =

Race riot in Maryland, United States

The Cambridge riot of 1967 was an urban riot which took place in Cambridge, Maryland on July 24, 1967. Cambridge, a segregated and economically depressed town, had been the site of high racial tensions since the arrival of Freedom Riders in 1961. Although black activists, led by Gloria Richardson, and the white city officials reached a Justice Department-brokered deal to end official discrimination in Cambridge in 1963, the town quickly walked back on many of its commitments, and black residents remained segregated in the town's Second Ward.

Gloria Richardson would leave for New York in 1964, where she met H. Rap Brown. At Richardson's encouragement, Brown visited Cambridge in 1967 and gave a rousing speech on the evening of July 24. Riots began after Brown was wounded by police shotgun fire while leaving the speech. A black elementary school was set on fire, and the refusal of Cambridge's white fire company to respond led to the blaze destroying two blocks in the Second Ward. At least two people were wounded in the unrest. Local officials and law enforcement blamed Brown's speech for the unrest, and he was arrested. Governor Spiro Agnew, previously known as a moderate on race, emerged as a fierce opponent of black radicalism following the riot.

While author Peter Levy disputes the characterization of the events as a "riot", it was classified as such by the Kerner Commission and most contemporary observers.

== Context and Brown's speech ==
=== Overview ===
For the first two centuries of its existence, Cambridge was a hub of the Maryland plantation economy, dependent on the labor of enslaved African Americans. After the end of the Civil War, the town transitioned to a manufacturing-based economy. By the mid-20th century, many black people worked in the packing industry in the area, but still suffered from low wages and high unemployment, particularly following regional economic troubles. Almost all of the town's black residents lived in the impoverished Second Ward. Overt racial segregation in schools and public facilities was abolished following the events of 1963 and the passage of the Civil Rights Act, but despite this, Cambridge's black population still suffered from deep inequality.

=== Cambridge movement and beginning of the riot ===
The collapse of local Phillips packing operations in the early 1960s precipitated high unemployment and discontent in Cambridge, particularly in the town's black community. The unemployment rate for black men in Cambridge was over twice that of white men. In 1961, the Freedom Riders came to Cambridge, part of an effort to desegregate seating and facilities for interstate buses. Many participants were students from regional colleges, such as Howard University in Washington, DC. Some also were members of such civil rights organizations as SNCC or CORE. The arrival of the Freedom Riders unleashed a fervent civil rights movement in the town. Encouraged by SNCC members, the black community in Cambridge conducted its own activism against segregation and racism, conducting sit-ins and demonstrations through 1962 and 1963 from a base in the Bethel AME Church. Gloria Richardson and her Cambridge Nonviolent Action Committee (CNAC) took a leading role. Police reacted violently, and black Cambridge residents began to arm themselves. Escalating tensions sparked a series of riots over the summer of 1963. In June 1963 martial law was imposed and the National Guard was ordered into the town. A protest on June 11 resulted in shots being exchanged after whites attacked black protesters marching to the Dorchester County Courthouse before curfew.

Perhaps disquieted by the violence so near to the nation's capital, Attorney General Robert F. Kennedy called an August meeting in Washington of both black and white leaders from Cambridge, hoping to negotiate an agreement that would allow progress and end the protests. The negotiations resulted in "The Treaty of Cambridge," an agreement adding an equal rights amendment to the city charter, among other commitments to desegregation and equality.

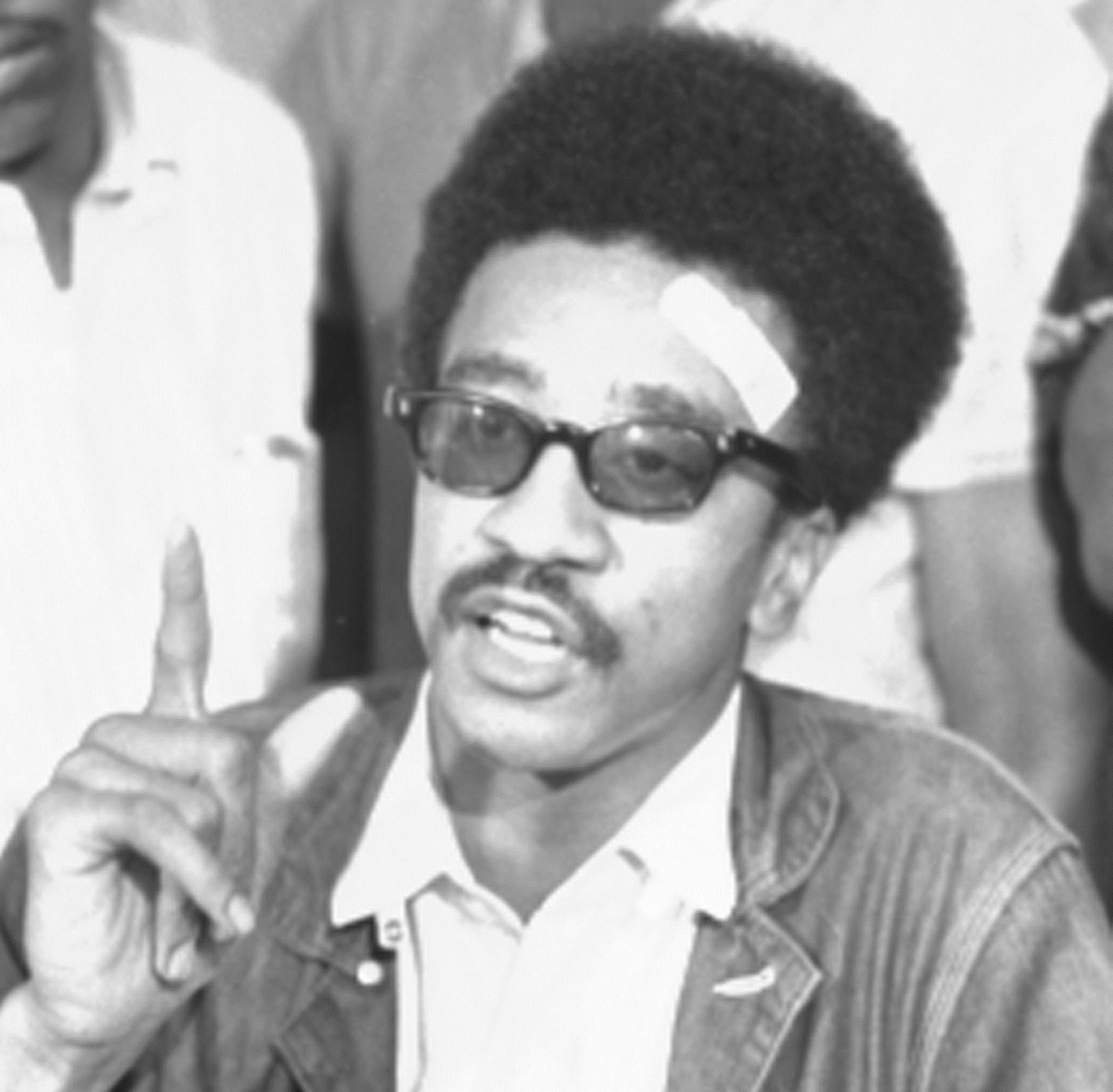
Brown, with a bandaged head, three days after the riot

Shortly after the passage of the "Treaty", the city government began to back away from many of the agreement's provisions, particularly those relating to desegregation in certain public facilities. A referendum on desegregation, sponsored by the Dorchester [County] Business and Citizens Association (DBCA), was called, against which Gloria Richardson called a boycott. Record turnout by white voters resulted in desegregation being narrowly defeated in March 1964. Emboldened, the DBCA invited Governor George Wallace to speak in Cambridge during his campaign for the democratic nomination in May, sparking another riot. The passage of the Civil Rights Act in July would finally end segregation in the town, and Gloria Richardson and her CNAC were increasingly perceived as troublemakers for their trenchant protest.

In late 1964, Richardson left Cambridge and moved to New York, where she married photographer Frank Dandridge, whom she had met when he was covering the protests in her town. In New York she met Hubert Gerold Brown, better known as H. Rap Brown, a Black Power activist who endorsed violent resistance. Famously, Brown said that violence was "as American as cherry pie".

At Richardson's urging, H. Rap Brown and visited Cambridge in July 1967. The weather in Cambridge was hot, with daytime highs in the nineties. On the evening of July 24, 1967, a widely advertised rally was held at the corner of Pine and Cedar streets. In an hour-long speech atop a car, Brown railed against institutional racism in the town, imploring black residents to continue their use boycotts but also consider violence, should it be necessary. At one point, Brown famously exclaimed that "It's time for Cambridge to explode, baby. Black folks built America, and if America don't come around, we're going to burn America down." When the rally finished around 10 PM, Brown left the scene, and crowds mostly dispersed. However, while Brown and others escorted a female visitor to the rally home, he was wounded by unprovoked police shotgun fire. Peter Levy writes that the shots were fired by Deputy Sheriff Wesley Burton. Brown's wound was light, and after he was bandaged, he was moved out of Cambridge.

== Riot and aftermath ==
An hour after learning that Brown had been shot, black residents began to gather and protest. According to Levy, white night riders drove through the second ward firing guns. A sizable police force, nearly equal in size to the crowd, arrived in the Second Ward. Eventually, a policeman was wounded by gunfire within the Second Ward. At 1 AM, the black elementary school on Pine Street, a social center of Dorchester County's black community, caught fire. Many sources state that the fire was set by an arsonist. The all-white fire company did not respond to the fire. Reportedly, firefighters said that "if the blacks had started it, they should finish it", and claimed that they were afraid of violence should they fight the fire. Eventually, the state's attorney in Cambridge commandeered an engine and firefighters, which was assisted by community members. However, the intervention was too little, too late, as the blaze had already begun to spread through the Ward.

Due to the refusal of the fire department to fight the school fire, embers ignited nearby buildings, eventually burning two square blocks in the Second Ward. A total of 17 buildings were destroyed. Despite the large numbers of police deployed, the Cambridge Police Department requested, and was granted, assistance from the Maryland National Guard, Maryland State Police, and Dorchester County Sheriffs. Police response was initially designed to contain violence within the Second Ward, and upon the arrival of other law enforcement forces, disperse rioters.Violence was quelled by the morning, and a manhunt was launched for Brown.

After the riot, Governor Spiro Agnew blamed the damage H. Rap Brown's inflammatory rhetoric. After inspecting the ruins of Pine Street, Governor Agnew said, “It shall now be the policy of the state to arrest any person inciting to riot, and to not allow that person to finish his vicious speech”. Agnew's response to the Cambridge riots is considered to have lent him new credibility among conservative white voters, ultimately contributing to his eventual selection as vice president by Richard Nixon.

Accounts of the riots and conditions varied. City officials said Cambridge did not have a black ghetto, that its long-segregated schools were among the finest in the nation, and that relationships between black and white residents were “excellent.” Media coverage of the riot focused on the role of H. Rap Brown, particularly drawing connections between the Black Power ideology blamed for the destruction and communism. In response to claims by city leaders and media, the Black Action Federation conducted polls in the riot-affected neighborhood which found that black Cambridge residents blamed systemic racism, not Brown, for the violence. Although the findings of local activists were not widely reported, this stance would eventually be shared by President Johnson's Kerner Commission.

Many white residents of Cambridge, and the mayor of Baltimore, Thomas D'Alesandro III, alleged that the riots had been planned in advance.

Two days later, Brown was arrested and charged with inciting the riot. Activists widely criticized the arrest as politically motivated, intended to "make an example" of Brown and deflect claims that official action had actually started the riot. Nonetheless, popular media overwhelmingly portrayed Brown's speech, rather than his wounding, as the catalyst for the riot.

As noted, Governor Agnew was outraged by the riot. He had earlier garnered a positive reputation in the black community due to his limited reforms aimed at alleviating official discrimination against black people in Maryland state law. However, the riot marked a turning point in Agnew's popularity among black Marylanders. Agnew resolutely referred to Brown as a “professional agitator,” and became increasingly critical of black civil rights leaders for what he said was their “failure” to stop rioting. After the April 1968 assassination of Martin Luther King Jr. and consequent riots, Agnew invited fifty Maryland civil rights leaders to a conference, where he gave a speech perceived as blaming black people for the riots. Many of the listeners walked out of the speech. By the end of his term as governor, he had lost most of his black support.

== See also ==
- 1967 Newark riots in New Jersey
- 1967 Plainfield riots in New Jersey
- 1967 Detroit riot in Michigan
- Cambridge riot of 1963
- List of incidents of civil unrest in the United States
