= 1967 Plainfield riots =

Race riots in New Jersey, United States

- Part of "Long Hot Summer of 1967" during the Civil Rights Movement
- Date: July 14–16, 1967
- Location: Plainfield, New Jersey
- Methods: Rioting, rock throwing, shootout, arson, looting
- Result: See Aftermath

Parties
Rioters, residents of Plainfield, NJ	State of New Jersey; New Jersey National Guard; New Jersey State Police; Plainfield, New Jersey; Plainfield Police Department

Casualties
- Death: 1
- Arrested: 150

The Plainfield riots was one of 159 race riots that swept cities in the United States during the "Long Hot Summer of 1967". This riot was a series of racially charged violent disturbances that occurred in Plainfield, New Jersey, which mirrored the 1967 Newark riots in nearby Newark.

== Background ==
Two days after some African Americans began protesting and rioting in Newark in 1967, the Plainfield riots began. Plainfield is located about 18 miles southwest of Newark, and about one third of Plainfield's 48,000 citizen were African Americans then. Tensions remained high that summer, through the night of Friday, July 14, when a fight broke out at a local diner, The White Star. Afterwards, about 40 young black men left the diner and marched back to their housing project in the West End section of Plainfield. They vented their anger along the way by smashing store windows and throwing rocks at police cars. When the local police showed up in force, the group dispersed.

The White Star Diner, which still stands today, was depicted by artist Casey Ruble in 2015.

== The riot ==
On Saturday night, trouble started again. Many long time residents of Plainfield claimed that "outside agitators" who did not live in Plainfield came into the city to provoke violence and "rile up" the community. Reports of rioting and looting increased and Molotov cocktails were thrown at fire trucks responding to calls. Police from surrounding jurisdictions were called in, and the crowds finally dispersed when a heavy rain started to fall early Sunday morning.

On Sunday afternoon several hundred people gathered at Green Brook Park to hear the local Director of Human Relations talk about the situation in the city. The Union County, New Jersey Park Police, who had jurisdiction over the park, declared the meeting unlawful and ordered the crowd to disperse. Some reported that the police dismissively referred to the gatherers as "boys", in urging them to leave the park, which was taken as racially inflammatory, and may have led to anger.

The crowd broke up and reformed in the West End section of Plainfield, where widespread rioting started again. The city police were caught off guard, and did not respond quickly enough to quell the disorder.

=== Murder of Officer John Gleason ===
Later that evening, a white police officer, John Gleason, was manning a checkpoint. Members of the white motorcycle gang known as the Pagans entered the area and a confrontation between a large group of young black men, and the white members of the Pagans was brewing. Police Officer John Gleason placed himself between the two groups, and the Pagan motorcycle gang left. The remaining crowd refused to disperse and Officer Gleason became surrounded by the crowd which began to threaten him and close in on him. Officer Gleason fired a shot and wounded Bobby Lee Williams. When the officer tried to leave the area to get help, he was overtaken by a mob and beaten with a steel grocery store cart, stomped, and eventually shot and killed with his own service revolver.

== Middlesex arms theft ==
That same night, in nearby Middlesex, an arms factory was broken into, and 46 automatic weapons were stolen. The Plainfield Machine Company was a small manufacturing company owned by William Haas and William Storck that, among other things, produced M1 carbines for the civilian market. The stolen guns were passed out to the men on the streets of Plainfield that very night. The police were anxious because of the large number of guns now on the streets, and the Plainfield Fire Department Station was under constant gunfire for five hours. The bullet holes in the brick facade of the building remain to this day. Finally, New Jersey National Guardsmen, in armored personnel carriers relieved the station.

Police tried to arrange a truce and have residents turn in the stolen carbines. Black residents felt that having the guns in the community kept the police at bay, and they now had power over the police. When none of the stolen firearms were returned, the area was cordoned off, and 300 heavily armed New Jersey State Police and National Guardsmen started a house-to-house search for the stolen weapons. After about an hour and a half, with 66 homes searched, the operation was called off. The police felt that since Governor Hughes had declared a State of Emergency, no search warrants were needed.

== Aftermath ==
By July 21, things had calmed down to the point at which National Guard troops and state police could be pulled out of the city.

Dozens of black residents later filed suit against the government, claiming that their constitutional rights had been violated during the search for the stolen carbines. Even several weeks after the riot, the local police and FBI were still looking for the stolen weapons. No arrests had been made in the theft, and only a few of the guns had been recovered.

More than 100 people had been arrested for looting and rioting during the disturbance. Officer Gleason was the only person killed during the riot, and in December 1968, a jury convicted two people, a man and a woman, of murder in his death. They were both sentenced to life imprisonment. Seven others were acquitted, and one case was declared a mistrial because of a deadlocked jury.

== Legacy ==
Like many cities, Plainfield suffered a decline from the stigma of the riots, and many of the burned and looted businesses remained vacant for over four decades. Several residents decamped for neighboring towns like Edison, Scotch Plains, Watchung, Warren, Westfield and Bridgewater. Many residents abandoned their houses after leaving, as the massive number of people selling their property resulted in people being unable to sell them (or at massively reduced prices). After leaving, since the owners did not want to live there anymore, but could not sell, they sometimes let them fall into foreclosure. After a while, many of them ended up derelict. Many of the houses were also turned into multi family homes. It remains one of the poorest urban areas in the state, with a 16 percent poverty rate, including over 7 percent having an income less than 50 percent of poverty level.

Author and Plainfield native Isaiah Tremaine published the book Insurrection in 2017 as an accounting of the Plainfield riots from his perspective as a black teenager living in the city at the time.

In July 2017, the Plainfield Anti-Violence Coalition held a memorial event to discuss and commemorate the 50th anniversary of the rebellion.

Playwright TyLie Shider has used the events of 1967 Plainfield as a backdrop for some of his work, including The Gospel Woman and Certain Aspects of Conflict in the Negro Family.

== See also ==
- 1967 Detroit riot in Michigan
- 1967 Newark riots in New Jersey
- Cambridge riot of 1967 in Maryland
- List of incidents of civil unrest in the United States
