= 1967 Buffalo riot =

Race riot in New York, United States

- Part of Long hot summer of 1967
- Date: June 26 - July 1, 1967
- Location: Buffalo, New York
- Methods: rioting, arson, vandalism

Parties
| Black residents of Buffalo | Buffalo; Buffalo Police Department; Buffalo Fire Department |

Casualties and losses
| 40+ injured | Three policemen and one firefighter injured |

The 1967 Buffalo riot was one of 159 race riots that swept cities in the United States during the "long, hot summer of 1967". This riot occurred on the East Side of Buffalo, New York from June 26 to July 1, 1967. On the afternoon of June 27, 1967, small groups of African American teenagers cruised the neighborhood of William Street and Jefferson Avenue breaking car and store windows. By night, nearly 200 riot-protected police were summoned and a violent encounter ensued.

Many African Americans, three policemen, and one fire fighter were injured. Although the riot dispersed that night, it began again the next afternoon with fires set, cars over-turned, and stores looted, many of them having the words "soul brother" written on them. This time 400 police were summoned. Forty black people were injured, nearly half from bullet wounds.

The riots virtually shut down the city. During the night of June 28, over 40 people were hurt, 14 with gunshot wounds. On June 30, Jackie Robinson, then serving as Governor Nelson Rockefeller's Special Assistant for Urban Affairs, met with Mayor Frank Sedita about the riots. It was the first move by the Governor to intervene in the violence.

On November 10, 1967, Dr. Martin Luther King Jr. visited Buffalo and in a speech titled "The Future of Integration" at Kleinhans Music Hall before about 2,500 persons sponsored by the Graduate Student Association at the University at Buffalo proclaimed: "We are moving toward the day when we will judge a man by his character and ability instead of by the color of his skin."

== See also ==
- List of incidents of civil unrest in the United States
