= Racial unrest in Cairo, Illinois =

Racial unrest and ethnic riots in Cairo, Illinois from 1967 to 1973

Cairo, Illinois, racial unrest
- Date: 1967–1973
- Location: Cairo, Illinois, United States
- Caused by: Segregation, poverty, unemployment
- Methods: Rioting, arson, sniping, picketing, boycott
- Result: White flight, followed by general depopulation of Cairo

Parties
Black residents United Front of Cairo; NAACP	White residents White hats	State of Illinois; Illinois National Guard; Illinois State Police; Cairo Police Department

Casualties
- Deaths: 4

From 1967 to 1973, an extended period of racial unrest occurred in the town of Cairo, Illinois. The city had long had racial tensions which boiled over after a black soldier was found hanged in his jail cell. Over the next several years, fire bombings, racially charged boycotts and shootouts were common place in Cairo, with 170 nights of gunfire reported in 1969 alone.

The unrest was a factor in the depopulation and overall decline of Cairo.

== Background ==
Cairo's turbulent history of race relations is often traced back to the lynching of black resident William James. In 1900, Cairo had a population of nearly 13,000. Of that total, approximately 5,000 residents were African-American. In 1900, this was an unusually high black population for a town of Cairo's size, and five percent of all black residents of the state of Illinois resided here. As a result of the large black population in a town with a traditionally southern white heritage (despite the fact that Illinois is not in the South), race relations were already strained by 1900. On the night of November 11, 1909, two men were lynched. The first man lynched was a black man named William James, who was allegedly responsible for the murder of Anna Pelley, a young white woman killed three days earlier. The second man lynched was a white man named Henry Salzner, who had allegedly murdered his wife in the previous August.

The decline of the steamboat industry in the early 20th century hurt Cairo's economy significantly. By the time of unrest in the 1960s, the unemployment rate of Cairo was more than twice the national average and poverty was widespread among both black and white people in the city.

== 1967 riot ==
The Cairo riot of 1967 was one of 159 race riots that swept cities in the United States during the "Long Hot Summer of 1967". This riot began on July 17, 1967, and persisted through three days of riots and protests.

Tensions had been building in Cairo for years prior to the incident. Black residents (roughly half the population of Cairo) were locked out of all jobs except menial labor. Similarly, Black residents were restricted from purchasing or renting homes, and could only live in the two block by one block area of the Pyramid Courts housing project. This housing project had not been maintained by the city or the project management offices since its erection in 1939 and was in disrepair, infested with rats and insects, and used a water system that was contaminated with lead. Black residents were ignored by the all white city council and could not get onto the ballot themselves, depriving them of any legitimate means of addressing grievances.

The incident began with the alleged jailhouse suicide of Private Robert Hunt, a young African-American soldier on leave in his hometown of Cairo. Police said Hunt hanged himself with his T-shirt, but Cairo's African-American residents challenged that story. The death touched off three days of riots and protests, followed by a seven-year renewal of civil rights activities in the city.

Several shootouts occurred throughout the city and at least six firebombings occurred. Three stores and a warehouse were burned down and a stabbing also occurred.

== Timeline ==
=== 1967 ===
- July 17 - Unrest starts after the suspicious jailhouse suicide of Robert Hunt. Six fire bombings occurred throughout the city, including attacks on three stores and a warehouse.
- July 19 - Three fire bombings occurred in the city - two at a lumber yard and one at the home of the lumber yard's foreman. Police also exchanged fire with snipers but no injuries occurred.
- July 20 - 100 national guardsmen are recalled after a night of low tensions.
- July 21 - Eight community leaders from Pyramid Courts attended the meeting and issued a list of demands: repairs to Pyramid Courts, political representation, an end to police brutality and job discrimination. Activist and future minister Charles Koen was one of the leaders present and insisted that their demands needed to be met without 72 hours. Other Black leaders agreed, warning that otherwise Cairo would "look like Rome burning down." Mayor Lee Stenzel held a meeting to a crowd of 400 angry white people in which he told them that the "negro problem" in the city had been brewing for a long time and that he needed more time to deal with it. In spite of the warnings, the city did not burn, and the riot ended within a matter of days. That same July, over six hundred white residents, including prominent members of the community, formed a vigilante group called the Committee of Ten Million. For the next two years, day and night, members of this group patrolled Cairo with firearms and police dogs, conducted paramilitary drills, and were empowered by the sheriff's department to threaten and arrest Black residents. They became known as the White Hats due to the white helmets they wore in their duties.

=== 1969 ===
- March 23 - Father Gerald Mantroy exposed the crippling poverty of the Black community in Cairo and the violence perpetrated by the White Hats in an interview on the front page of the St. Louis Post-Dispatch. An organization called Concerned Clergy was formed in East St. Louis, and with the support of Bishop Albert Rudolph Zuroweste sent twenty priests and ministers to Cairo to support Montroy and the Black community. In response, the White Hats conducted their own interviews with the press, defending the use of intimidation tactics.
- March 31 - Around 10pm, members of the White Hats stood on a levee and fired rifles and shotguns into the Pyramid Courts housing project. Some residents returned fire, others shot out the streelights to provide cover. A railyard lay between the levee and the housing project, and some railcrew workers were caught in the crossfire. Assaults on the project would continue almost daily over the next several years, with the residents sleeping in bathtubs and occasionally firing back at their assailants.
- April 7 - Cairo's United Front called for a boycott of any store in the business district that refused to hire Black workers. The group picketed each Saturday for almost three years. In the first year, eleven businesses closed rather than capitulate to the protesters. Eventually a third of the downtown stores would go out of business.
- April 26 - State attorney Peyton Berbling issued warrants to search three apartments in Pyramid Courts for guns and explosives. The apartments were ransacked in the afternoon while the occupants of the apartments were picketing downtown. No weapons were found.
- April 26–28 - A total of 28 fire bombings occurred throughout the city over the weekend. A laundromat, a tavern and a mostly Black high school were bombed while the Tri-County Health center was set alight twice. During the second fire at the health center, firemen attempting to extinguish the flames and the policemen protecting them were fired at. In another incident, policemen tried to enter the Pyramid housing projects to search for a murder weapon, but were confronted by 200 black residents of the projects and forced to leave.
- May 1 - 175 National Guardsmen and 30 State Policemen were deployed to Cairo to help the 15-man police force enforce a curfew over the city. Mayor Lee Stenzel, Police Chief Carl Clutts and civic and business leaders city testified at the Illinois State capitol on the unrest.
- May 26 - Two waves of violence occurred in 24 hours. In the first incident, a number of gunmen attacked the Cairo police station, firing over 100 rounds into the building over the course of 15 minutes. In the second incident, a wallpaper warehouse and the Tri-County Health center were firebombed and responding firemen were shot at. The firemen allowed the health center to burn to the ground as it was scheduled to destroyed due to previous bombings.
- June 12–14 - Four fire bombings and two gunfire incidents occurred.
- June 15 - Sniper fire and fire bombings occurred throughout Cairo. A large discount store was fire bombed and responding firefighters were shot at. A group of black residents firebombed several white residences and there were total of about a dozen fires. There was speculation that the unrest was related to the appointment of former Alton police chief William Petersen to chief of Cairo police.
- June 18 - Policemen engaged in a shootout with an unknown gunmen at an abandoned building. An unoccupied house in a black neighborhood and a storage shed for a lumber company were set on fire as well.
- June 20 - A nine-member legislative committee recommended that a 70-man state police force patrol the city and that White Hats members should not be deputized. They also recommended that Governor Richard B. Ogilvie request the federal government to declare a state of emergency so that federal funding for housing and business development be made available.
- June 26 - Groups of white and black residents threw rocks and bricks at each other after a march of 400 white people demanding "equal rights for whites" ended.
- July 15 - Six ministers from the United Front of Cairo were evicted from Governor Ogilvie's reception office in Springfield where they had organized a sit-in.
- August 28–29 - Scattered gunfire reported throughout the city, including incident in which patrol cars were fired at, but no injuries reported.

=== 1970 ===
- July 23 - Several shootouts between white and black people occurred throughout the city, with the heaviest concentration being at the Pyramid Courts housing project.
- October 27 - Governor Ogilvie ordered a 24-man state police force as well as an armored car to patrol Cairo for an indefinite period to stop the "indiscriminate gunfire and lawlessness" in the city. The order came after the Cairo police station was attacked with automatic gunfire on three occasions.
- December 17 - Senator Charles H. Percy was visited in Washington by three Cairo high school students, the mayor and business leaders to discuss bringing peace to city.

== Aftermath ==
In 1971 and 1972, the City Council repeatedly blocked efforts of a United Front backed corporation to buy vacant city lots and build affordable housing for both white and black residents. The Lawyers' Committee for Civil Rights Under Law arrived in Cairo in September 1969 to work with the Pyramid Courts Tenants Council. They filed a class action lawsuit that resulted in the desegregation of public housing by 1974, ending the shootings from the nearby levee. Over the next decade they also challenged unconstitutional city ordinances and provided assistance to residents who had been arrested or abused. In 1980 the first Black representative was elected to the city council.

The racial conflict resulted in a mass exodus of white residents from Cairo, which was already experiencing population decline before the unrest began. The white-owned businesses that closed due to the United Front boycott were not replaced by new businesses. The population of Cairo has declined from 9,348 in 1960 to approximately 2,359 in 2016. The peak population was 15,203 in 1920.

== See also ==
- List of incidents of civil unrest in the United States
