= King assassination riots =

Riots following the assassination of Martin Luther King Jr

- Part of the civil rights movement, the Protests of 1968 and Ghetto riots
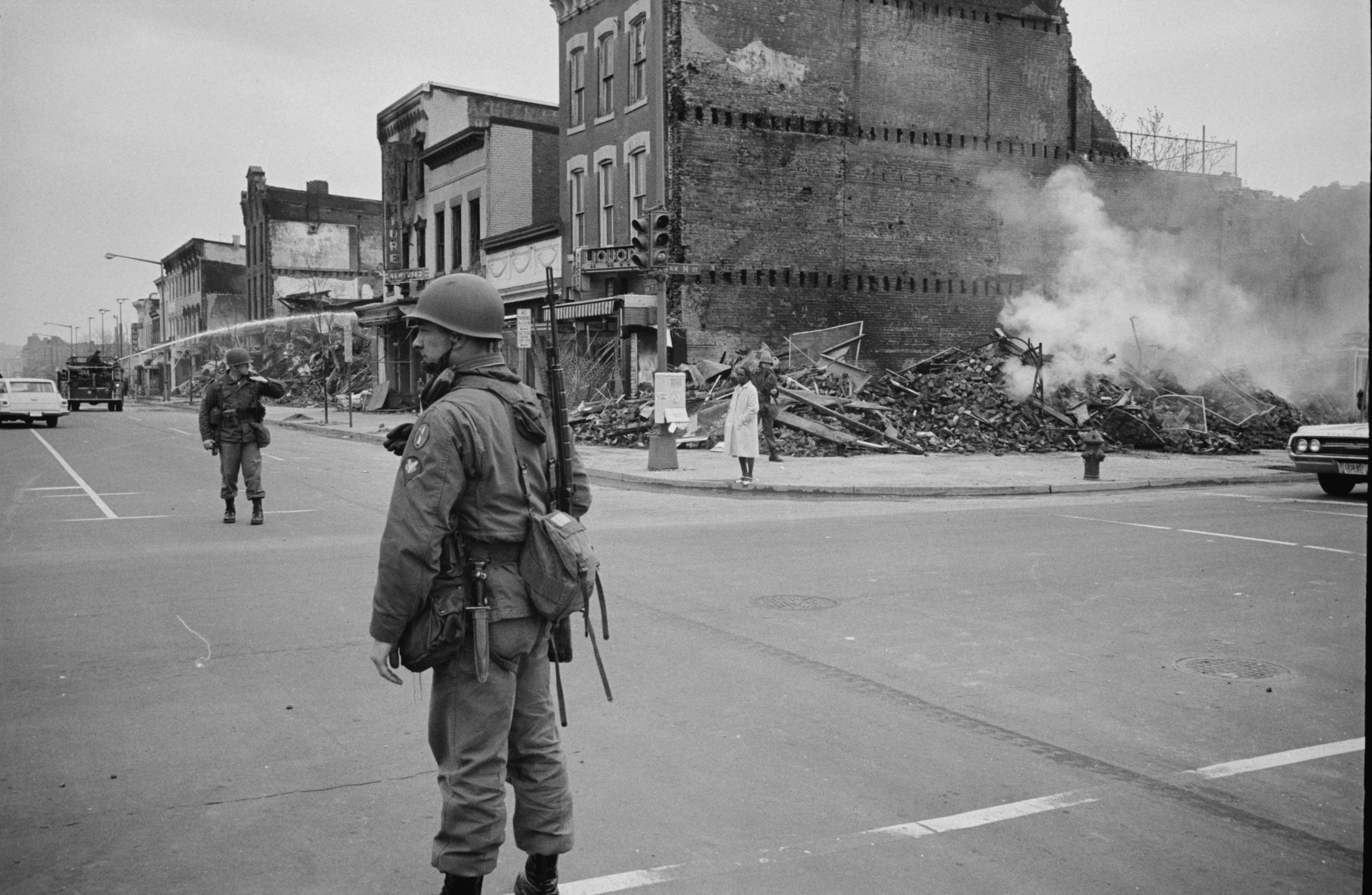
- Soldiers stand near ruined buildings in Washington, D.C.
- Date: April 4–11, 1968 (1 week)
- Location: Over 100 cities across the United States
- Caused by: Assassination of Martin Luther King Jr., racial inequality
- Methods: Rioting, looting, protesting, arson

Casualties
- Deaths: 43
- Injuries: 3,000+
- Arrested: 20,000+

The King assassination riots, also known as the Holy Week Uprising, were a wave of civil disturbance which swept across the United States following the assassination of Martin Luther King Jr. on April 4, 1968. Some of the biggest riots took place in Washington, D.C., Baltimore, Chicago, and Kansas City.

== Overview ==
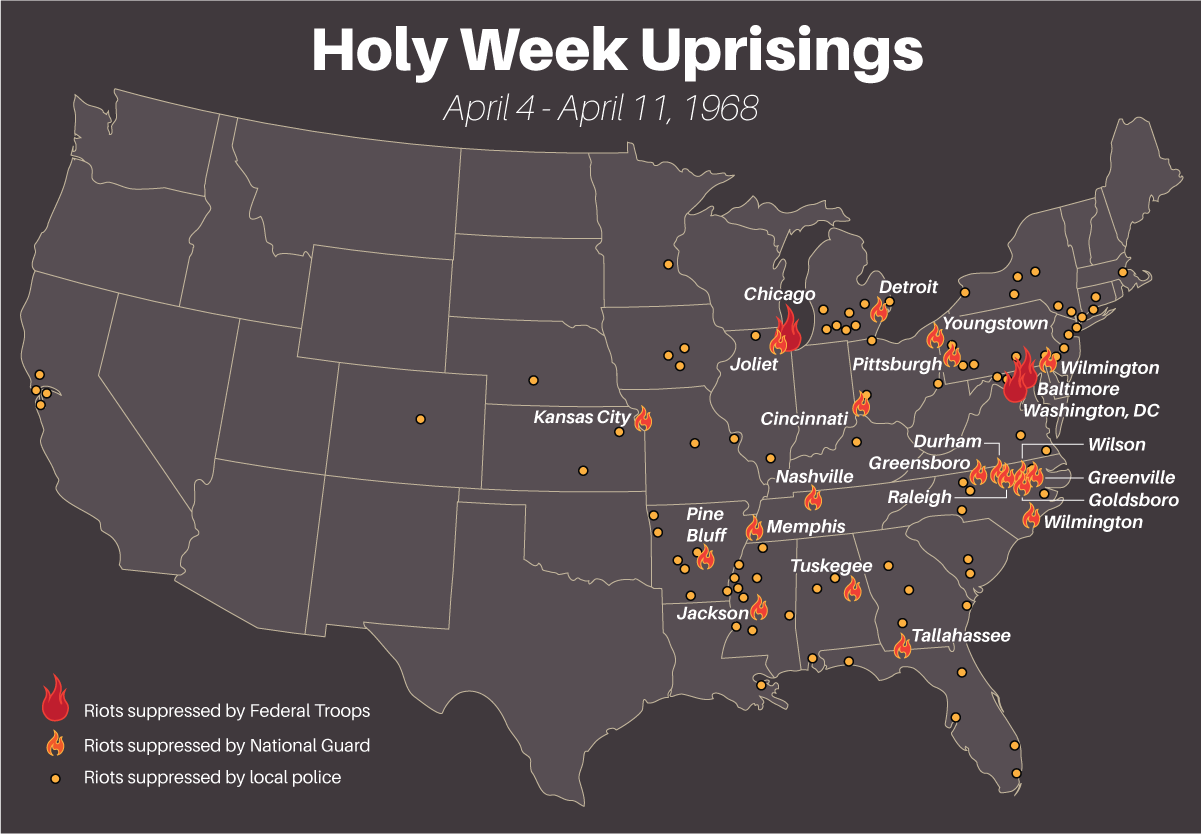
Riots occurred nationwide, but were concentrated in the Midwest, Mid-Atlantic, and South.

=== Causes ===
The immediate cause of the rioting was the assassination of Martin Luther King Jr. King was not only a leader in the civil rights movement, but also an advocate for nonviolence. He pursued direct engagement with the political system (as opposed to the separatist ideas of black nationalism). His death led to anger, disillusionment, and feelings that, thereafter, only violent resistance to white supremacy could be effective.

=== Riots ===
The protesters were mostly Black; not all were poor. Middle-class Black people also demonstrated against systemic inequality. At the time, the media described these events as “race riots” and white businesses tended to be targeted. However, white public and community buildings such as schools and churches were largely spared.

Compared to the previous summer of rioting, the number of fatalities was lower, largely attributed to new procedures instituted by the federal government, and orders not to fire on looters.

== Events by city ==
In New York City, Mayor John Lindsay traveled directly into Harlem, telling black residents that he regretted King's death and was working against poverty. He is credited for averting major riots in New York with this direct response although minor disturbances still erupted in the city. In Indianapolis, Indiana, Senator Robert F. Kennedy's speech on the assassination of Martin Luther King Jr. is credited with preventing a riot there. In Boston, rioting may have been averted by a James Brown concert taking place on the night of April 5, with Brown, Mayor Kevin White, and city councilor Tom Atkins speaking to the Garden crowd about peace and unity before the show.

In Los Angeles, the Los Angeles Police Department and community activists averted a repeat of the 1965 riots that devastated portions of the city. Several memorials were held in tribute to King throughout the Los Angeles area on the days leading into his funeral service.

=== Washington, D.C. ===
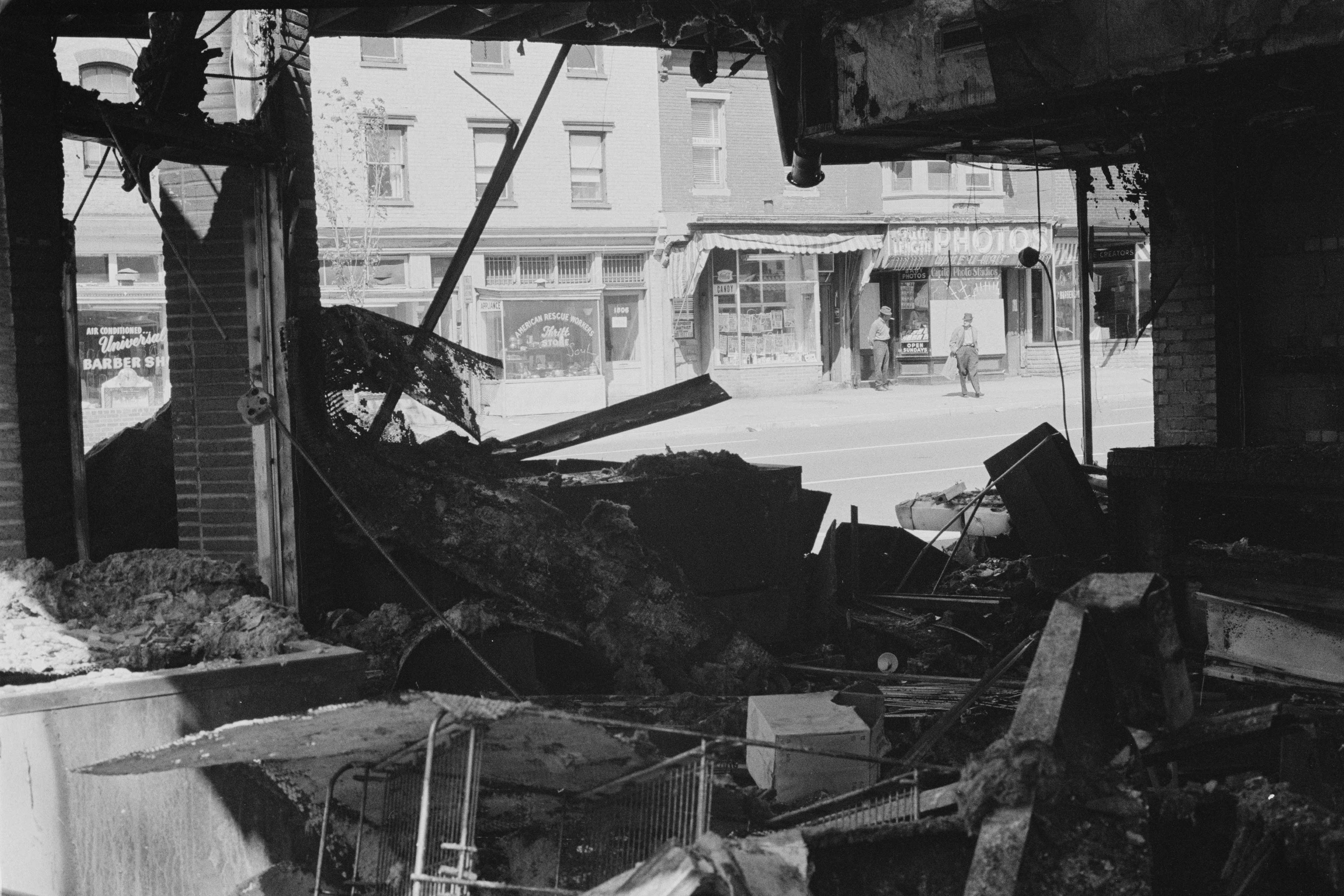
Damage to a Washington store following the riots

The Washington, D.C., riots of April 4–8, 1968, resulted in Washington, along with Chicago and Baltimore, receiving the heaviest impact of the 110 cities to see unrest following the King assassination.

The ready availability of jobs in the growing federal government attracted many to Washington since the early 20th century, and middle class African-American neighborhoods prospered. Despite the end of legally mandated racial segregation, the historic neighborhoods of Shaw, the H Street Northeast corridor, and Columbia Heights, centered at the intersection of 14th and U Streets Northwest, remained the centers of African-American commercial life in the city.

As word of King's murder by James Earl Ray in Memphis spread on the evening of Thursday, April 4, crowds began to gather at 14th and U. Stokely Carmichael led members of the Student Nonviolent Coordinating Committee (SNCC) to stores in the neighborhood demanding that they close out of respect. Although polite at first, the crowd fell out of control and began breaking windows. By 11:00 pm, widespread looting had begun.

Mayor-Commissioner Walter Washington ordered the damage cleaned up immediately the next morning. Anger was still evident on Friday morning when Carmichael addressed a rally at Howard, warning of violence. After the close of the rally, crowds walking down 7th Street NW and in the H Street NE corridor came into violent confrontations with police. By midday, numerous buildings were on fire, and firefighters were prevented from responding by crowds attacking with bottles and rocks.

Crowds of as many as 20,000 overwhelmed the District's 3,100-member police force, and 11,850 federal troops and 1,750 D.C. National Guardsmen under orders of President Lyndon B. Johnson arrived on the streets of D.C. to assist them. Marines mounted machine guns on the steps of the Capitol and Army soldiers from the 3rd Infantry guarded the White House. At one point, on April 5, rioting reached within two blocks of the White House before rioters retreated. The occupation of Washington was the largest of any American city since the Civil War. Mayor Washington imposed a curfew and banned the sale of alcohol and guns in the city. By the time the city was considered pacified on Sunday, April 8, some 1,200 buildings had been burned, including over 900 stores. Damages reached $27 million.

The riots utterly devastated Washington's inner city economy. With the destruction or closing of businesses, thousands of jobs were lost, and insurance rates soared. Made uneasy by the violence, city residents of all races accelerated their departure for suburban areas, depressing property values. Crime in the burned out neighborhoods rose sharply, further discouraging investment.

On some blocks, only rubble remained for decades. Columbia Heights and the U Street corridor did not begin to recover economically until the opening of the U Street and Columbia Heights Metro stations in 1991 and 1999, respectively, while the H Street NE corridor remained depressed for several years longer.

Mayor-Commissioner Washington, who was the last presidentially appointed mayor of Washington, went on to become the city's first elected mayor.

=== Chicago ===
Film shot by DASPO CONUS on April 9, 1968, of Chicago after the riots

On April 5, one day after King was assassinated, violence sparked on the West side of Chicago. It eventually expanded to consume a 28-block stretch of West Madison Street, with additional damage occurring on Roosevelt Road. The North Lawndale and East Garfield Park neighborhoods on the West Side and the Woodlawn neighborhood on the South Side experienced the majority of the destruction and chaos. The rioters broke windows, looted stores, and set buildings (both abandoned and occupied) on fire. Firefighters quickly flooded the neighborhood, and Chicago's off-duty firefighters were told to report for duty. There were 36 major fires reported between 4:00 pm and 10:00 pm alone. The next day, Mayor Richard J. Daley imposed a curfew on anyone under the age of 21, closed the streets to automobile traffic, and halted the sale of guns or ammunition.

Approximately 10,500 police were sent in, and by April 6, more than 6,700 Illinois National Guard troops had arrived in Chicago with 5,000 regular Army soldiers from the 1st Armored and 5th Infantry Divisions being ordered into the city by President Johnson. The General in charge declared that no one was allowed to have gatherings in the riot areas, and he authorized the use of tear gas. Daley gave police the authority "to shoot to kill any arsonist or anyone with a Molotov cocktail in his hand... and... to shoot to maim or cripple anyone looting any stores in our city."

By the time order was restored on April 7, 11 people had died, 500 had been injured, and 2,150 had been arrested. Over 200 buildings were damaged in the disturbance with damage costs running up to $10 million.

The south side ghetto had escaped the major chaos mainly because the two large street gangs, the Blackstone Rangers and the East Side Disciples, cooperated to control their neighborhoods. Many gang members did not participate in the rioting, due in part to King's direct involvement with these groups in 1966.

=== Baltimore ===
The Baltimore riot of 1968 began two days after the murder. On Saturday, April 6, the governor of Maryland, Spiro T. Agnew, called out thousands of National Guard troops and 500 Maryland State Police to quell the disturbance. When it was determined that the state forces could not control the riot, Agnew requested Federal troops from President Lyndon B. Johnson. The riot was precipitated by King's assassination, but was also evidence of larger frustrations among the city's African-American population.

By Sunday evening, 5,000 paratroopers, combat engineers, and artillerymen from the XVIII Airborne Corps in Fort Bragg, North Carolina, specially trained in tactics, including sniper school, were on the streets of Baltimore with fixed bayonets, and equipped with chemical (CS) disperser backpacks. Two days later, they were joined by a Light Infantry Brigade from Fort Benning, Georgia. With all the police and troops on the streets, the situation began to calm down. The Federal Bureau of Investigation reported that H. Rap Brown was in Baltimore driving a Ford Mustang with Broward County, Florida tags, and was assembling large groups of angry protesters and agitating them to escalate the rioting. In several instances, these disturbances were rapidly quelled through the use of bayonets and chemical dispersers by the XVIII Airborne units. That unit arrested more than 3,000 detainees, who were turned over to the Baltimore Police. A general curfew was set at 6 p.m. in the city limits and martial law was enforced. As rioting continued, African American plainclothes police officers and community leaders were sent to the worst areas to prevent further violence. By the end of the unrest, 6 people had died, 700 were injured, and 5,800 had been arrested; property damage was estimated at over $12 million.

One of the major outcomes of the riot was the attention Governor Agnew received when he criticized local black leaders for not doing enough to help stop the disturbance. While this angered black people and white liberals, it caught the attention of Republican presidential candidate Richard Nixon, who was looking for someone on his ticket who could counter George Wallace's American Independent Party campaign. Agnew became Nixon's vice presidential running mate in 1968.

=== Kansas City ===
The rioting in Kansas City did not erupt on April 4, like other cities of the United States affected directly by the assassination of King, but rather on April 9 after local events within the city. The riot was sparked when Kansas City Police Department deployed tear gas against student protesters when they staged their performances outside City Hall.

The deployment of tear gas dispersed the protesters from the area, but other citizens of the city began to riot as a result of the police action on the student protesters. The resulting effects of the riot resulted in the arrest of over 100 adults, and left six dead and at least 20 admitted to hospitals.

=== Detroit ===
Although not as large as other cities, violent disturbances did erupt in Detroit. Michigan governor George W. Romney ordered the National Guard into Detroit. One person was killed, and gangs tossed objects at cars and smashed storefront windows along 12th Street on the west side.

=== New York City ===
Riots erupted in New York City the night King was murdered. Sporadic violence and looting occurred in Harlem, the largest African-American neighborhood in Manhattan. Tensions simmered down after Mayor John Lindsay traveled into the heart of the area and stated that he regretted King's wrongful death. However, numerous businesses were still looted and set afire in Harlem and Brooklyn following the statement.

=== Pittsburgh ===
Disturbances erupted in Pittsburgh on April 5 and continued through April 11. The riot peaked on April 7 in which one person was killed and 3,600 National Guardsmen were deployed into the city. Over 100 businesses were either looted or burned in the Hill District, Homewood, and North Side neighborhoods with various structures being set afire by arsonists. The riot left many of the city's black commercial districts in shambles and the areas most impacted by the unrest were slow to recover in the following decades.

=== Cincinnati ===
The Cincinnati riots were in response to the assassination of Martin Luther King Jr. on April 4, 1968. Tension in the Avondale neighborhood had already been high due to a lack of job opportunities for African-American men, and the assassination escalated that tension. On April 8, around 1,500 black people attended a memorial held at a local recreation center. An officer of the Congress of Racial Equality blamed white Americans for King's death and urged the crowd to retaliate. The crowd was orderly when it left the memorial and spilled out into the street. Nearby James Smith, a black man, attempted to protect a jewelry store from a robbery with his own shotgun. During the struggle with the robbers, also black, Smith accidentally shot and killed his wife.

Rioting started after a false rumor was spread in the crowd that Smith's wife was actually killed by a white police officer. Rioters smashed store windows and looted merchandise. More than 70 fires had been set, several of them major. During the rioting eight young African Americans dragged a white student, Noel Wright, and his wife from their car in Mount Auburn. Wright was stabbed to death and his wife was beaten. The next night, the city was put under curfew, and nearly 1,500 National Guardsmen were brought in to subdue the violence. Several days after the riot started, two people were dead, hundreds were arrested, and the city had suffered $3 million in property damage.

=== Trenton, New Jersey ===
The Trenton Riots of 1968 were a major civil disturbance that took place during the week following the assassination of Martin Luther King Jr. in Memphis, Tennessee, on April 4. More than 200 Trenton businesses, mostly in Downtown, were ransacked and burned. More than 300 people, most of them young black men, were arrested on charges ranging from assault and arson to looting and violating the mayor's emergency curfew. In addition to 16 injured policemen, 15 firefighters were treated at city hospitals for smoke inhalation, burns, sprains and cuts suffered while fighting raging blazes or for injuries inflicted by rioters. Denizens of Trenton's urban core often pulled false alarms and would then throw bricks at firefighters responding to the alarm boxes. This experience, along with similar experiences in other major cities, effectively ended the use of open-cab fire engines. As an interim measure, the Trenton Fire Department fabricated temporary cab enclosures from steel deck plating until new equipment could be obtained. The losses incurred by downtown businesses were initially estimated by the city to be $7 million, but the total of insurance claims and settlements came to $2.5 million.

Trenton's Battle Monument neighborhood was hardest hit. Since the 1950s, North Trenton had witnessed a steady exodus of middle-class residents, and the riots spelled the end for North Trenton. By the 1970s, the region had become one of the most blighted and crime-ridden in the city, although gentrification in the area eventually followed.

=== Wilmington, Delaware ===
The two-day riot that occurred after King's assassination was small compared with riots in other cities, but its aftermath – a 9 1/2-month occupation by the National Guard – highlighted the depth of Wilmington's racial problem. During the riot, which occurred on April 9–10, 1968, the mayor asked for a small number of National Guardsmen to help restore order. Democratic governor Charles L. Terry (a southern-style Democrat) sent in the entire state National Guard and refused to remove them after the rioting was brought under control. Republican Russell W. Peterson defeated Governor Terry, and upon his inauguration in January 1969, Governor Peterson ended the National Guard's occupation in Wilmington.

=== Louisville ===
Riots occurred in Louisville, Kentucky, in May 1968. As in many other cities around the country, there were unrest and riots partially in response to the assassination. On May 27, 1968, a group of 400 people, mostly Black people, gathered at Twenty-Eight and Greenwood Streets, in the Parkland neighborhood. The intersection, and Parkland in general, had recently become an important location for Louisville's black community, as the local NAACP branch had moved its office there.

The crowd was protesting the possible reinstatement of a white officer who had been suspended for beating an African-American man some weeks earlier. Several community leaders arrived and told the crowd that no decision had been reached, and alluded to disturbances in the future if the officer was reinstated. By 8:30, the crowd began to disperse.

However, rumors (which turned out to be untrue) were spread that Student Nonviolent Coordinating Committee speaker Stokely Carmichael's plane to Louisville was being intentionally delayed by white people. After bottles were thrown by the crowd, the crowd became unruly and police were called. However the small and unprepared police response simply upset the crowd more, which continued to grow. The police, including a captain who was hit in the face by a bottle, retreated, leaving behind a patrol car, which was turned over and burned.

By midnight, rioters had looted stores as far east as Fourth Street, overturned cars and started fires.

Within an hour, Mayor Kenneth A. Schmied requested 700 Kentucky National Guard troops and established a citywide curfew. Violence and vandalism continued to rage the next day, but had subdued somewhat by May 29. Business owners began to return, although troops remained until June 4. Police made 472 arrests related to the riots. Two African-American teenagers had died, and $200,000 in damage had been done.

The disturbances had a longer-lasting effect. Most white business owners quickly pulled out or were forced out of Parkland and surrounding areas. Most white residents also left the West End, which had been almost entirely white north of Broadway, from subdivision until the 1960s. The riot would have effects that shaped the image which white people would hold of Louisville's West End, that it was predominantly black and crime-ridden.

== Local issues ==
The assassinations triggered active unrest in communities that were already discontented. For example, the Memphis sanitation strike, which was already underway, took on a new level of urgency. It was to these striking workers that King delivered his final speech, and in Memphis that he was killed. Negotiations on April 16 brought an end to the strike and a promise of better wages.

In Oakland, increasing friction between Black Panthers and the police led to the death of Bobby Hutton.

== Official responses ==
=== President Johnson ===
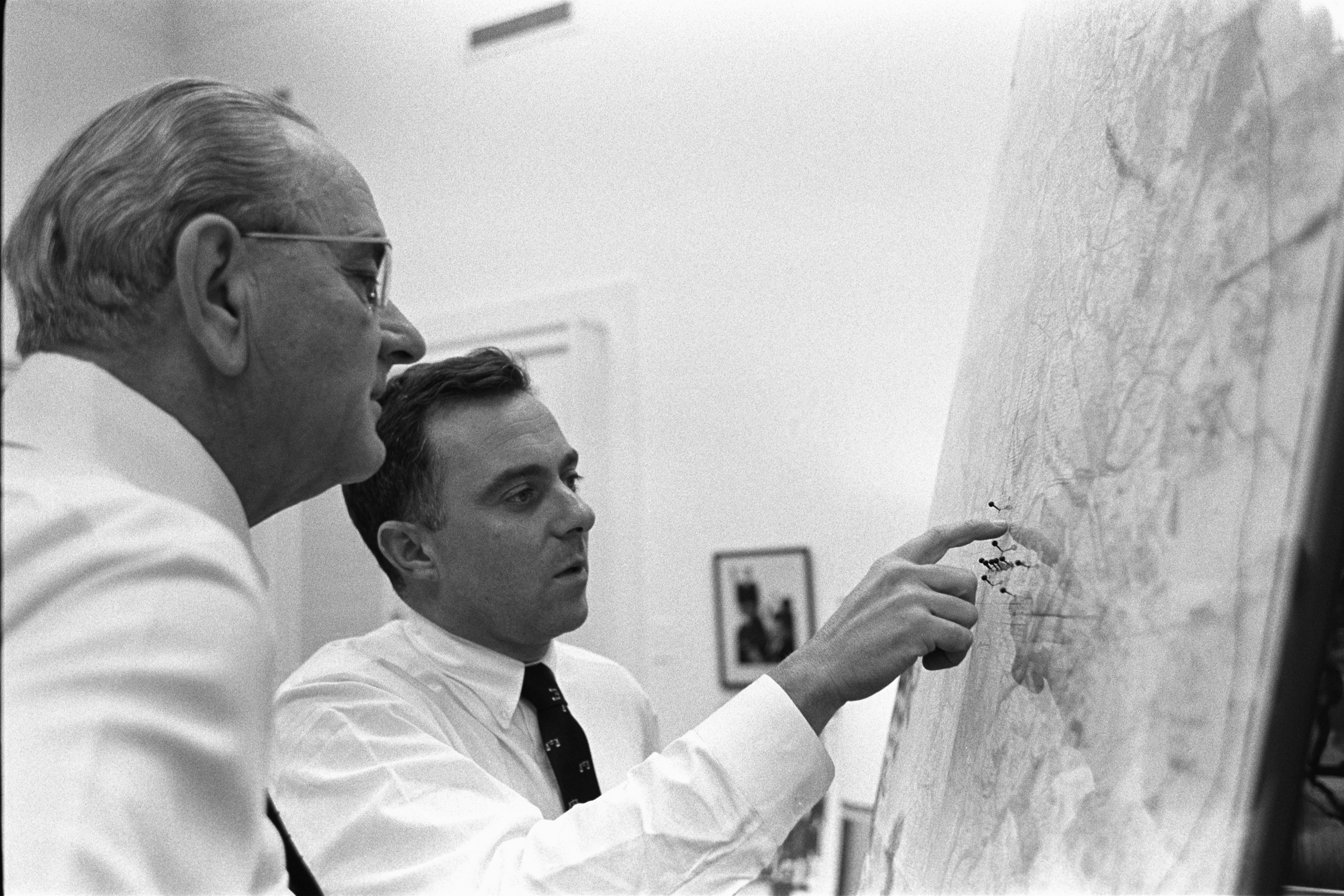
President Lyndon B. Johnson and Joe Califano chart riot outbreaks in Washington, D.C.

On April 4, President Lyndon B. Johnson denounced King's murder. He also began to communicate with a host of mayors and governors preparing for a reaction from black America. He cautioned against unnecessary force, but felt like local governments would ignore his advice, saying to aides, "I'm not getting through. They're all holing up like generals in a dugout getting ready to watch a war."

On April 5, at 11:00 AM, Johnson met with an array of leaders in the Cabinet Room. These included Vice President Hubert Humphrey, Chief Justice of the United States Earl Warren, Supreme Court Justice Thurgood Marshall, and federal judge Leon Higginbotham; government officials such as secretary Robert Weaver and D.C. Mayor Walter Washington; legislators Mike Mansfield, Everett Dirksen, William McCulloch; and civil rights leaders Whitney Young, Roy Wilkins, Clarence Mitchell, Dorothy Height, and Walter Fauntroy. Notably absent were representatives of more radical groups such as SNCC and CORE. At the meeting, Mayor Washington asked President Johnson to deploy troops to the District of Columbia. Richard Hatcher, the newly elected black mayor of Gary, Indiana, spoke to the group about white racism and his fears of racially motivated violence in the future. Many of these leaders told Johnson that socially progressive legislation would be the best response to the crisis. The meeting concluded with prayers at the Washington National Cathedral.

According to press secretary George Christian, Johnson was not surprised by the riots that followed: "What did you expect? I don't know why we're so surprised. When you put your foot on a man's neck and hold him down for three hundred years, and then you let him up, what's he going to do? He's going to knock your block off."

=== Military deployment ===
After the Watts riots in 1965 and the Detroit riot of 1967, the military began preparing heavily for black insurrection. The Pentagon's Army Operations Center thus quickly began its response to the assassination on the night of April 4, directing air force transport planes to prepare for an occupation of Washington, D.C. The Army also dispatched undercover agents to gather information.

On April 5, Johnson ordered mobilization of the Army and National Guard, particularly for D.C.

=== Legislative response ===
Some responded to the riots with suggestions for improving the conditions that engendered them. Many White House aides took the opportunity to push their preferred programs for urban improvement. At the same time, some members of Congress criticized Johnson. Senator Richard Russell felt Johnson was not going far enough to suppress the violence. Senator Robert Byrd suggested that Washington, D.C. ought to be occupied indefinitely by the army.

Johnson chose to focus his political capital on a fair housing bill proposed by Senator Sam Ervin. He urged Congress to pass the bill, starting with an April 5 letter addressed to the Speaker of the United States House of Representatives, John William McCormack. These events led to the rapid passage of the Civil Rights Act of 1968, Title VIII of which is known as the "Fair Housing Act".

=== President's communication with local governments ===
Audio records reveal a tense and variable relationship between Johnson and local officials. In conversations with Chicago mayor Richard J. Daley, Johnson describes the complications with ordering federal troops before local governments have exhausted all options. Later, Johnson would describe the domestic unrest as another front in the global war, criticizing Daley for not requesting troops sooner. From the transcript:

President Johnson: [Unclear] ... Goddammit, I don't know how we handle these things. But I know one thing: that we've got to handle them with muscle and with toughness. And we put troops in every place they asked me to, and we came after it [in] reasonably good shape.

Daley: But the thing is, is there's just so much of this destruction takes place before we're able to—that was my observation. We have all these things destroyed before we ever—

President Johnson: Well, that's right. Now, Mayor, if you want my judgment what's wrong, it's wrong with your not asking for it.

In the same call, Johnson told Daley he wanted to use a strategy of pre-emption: "I'd rather move them and not need them than need them and not have them."

== Impact ==
=== Physical ===
Some areas were heavily damaged by the riots, and recovered slowly. In Washington, D.C., poor urban planning decisions on the part of the federal and local government were an obstacle to recovery.

=== Political ===
Dr. King had campaigned for a federal fair housing law throughout 1966, but had not achieved it. Senator Walter Mondale advocated for the bill in Congress, but noted that over successive years, a fair housing bill was the most filibustered legislation in US history. It was opposed by most Northern and Southern senators, as well as the National Association of Real Estate Boards. Mondale commented that:

A lot of [previous] civil rights [legislation] was about making the South behave and taking the teeth from George Wallace ... This came right to the neighborhoods across the country. This was civil rights getting personal.

The assassination and subsequent riots quickly revived the bill. On April 5, Johnson wrote a letter to the United States House of Representatives urging passage of the Civil Rights Act of 1968, which included the Fair Housing Act. The Rules Committee, "jolted by the repeated civil disturbances virtually outside its door," finally ended its hearings on April 8. With newly urgent attention from White House legislative director Joseph Califano and Speaker of the House John McCormack, the bill—which was previously stalled that year—passed the House by a wide margin on April 10.

=== Social ===
For some liberals and civil rights advocates, the riots were a turning point. However, they increased an already-strong trend toward de facto racial segregation and white flight in America's cities, strengthening racial barriers that looked as though they might weaken. The riots were political fodder for the Republican party, which used fears of black urban crime to garner support for law and order, especially in the 1968 presidential campaign. The assassination and riots radicalized many, helping to fuel the Black Power movement.

== See also ==
- Black Rage
- George Floyd Protests (2020)
- Post-civil rights era African-American history
- List of incidents of civil unrest in the United States
- Long Hot Summer (1967)
- Red Summer (1919)
