= Donald Murphy =

Donald Murphy may refer to:

- Don Murphy (born 1967), American film producer
- Donald E. Murphy (born 1960), Maryland politician
- Don Murphy (Cubmaster), creator of the Pinewood derby
- Donald Wayne Murphy (born 1950), author and parks and recreation official
- Donald Murphy (actor), American film and television actor
- Donald Murphy (serial killer), American serial killer, sex offender and bank robber
- Donal Murphy (born 1955), Irish footballer

== See also ==
- Don Murray (disambiguation)
- Donald Murray (disambiguation)
