= Bigfoot Killer =

Unidentified American serial killer

- Other name: "The Cass Ripper"

Details
- Victims: 7-8+
- Span of crimes: February 16 – October 19, 1975
- Country: United States
- State: Michigan
- Date apprehended: Never apprehended

The Bigfoot Killer is the name given to an unidentified American serial killer who raped and murdered seven girls and women in Detroit between February and October 1975. All of the victims were engaged in prostitution and impoverished, with their killings taking place in the Cass Corridor neighborhood.

== Murders ==
The perpetrator chose women and adolescents aged 16 to 43 who prostituted themselves on the streets as victims. In early 1975, he committed at least four rapes, with his victims going to the police and describing his appearance, from which a facial composite was created. Between February 16 and October 19 the offender killed a total of seven women, five black and two white. During the investigation, witnesses reported that the killer had driven a beige Oldsmobile, and after offering $15 in exchange for sexual services, he lured the victims to his car, after which he threatened them with a knife, beat, raped, sodomized and finally strangled them. He was described as a muscular, tall African-American with facial hair and an afro, likely between the ages of 30 and 35. According to police, he may have suffered from acromegaly, since, according to testimonies and other evidence, he had large hands and feet. As a result of this, he was nicknamed "Bigfoot". After this information was revealed to the public, at the end of 1975, a number of NGO activists and several hundred residents of the Cass Corridor organized a rally in front of the police station, accusing the authorities of negligence due to the victims' social status. They appealed to the city's administrative bodies demanding an investigation and subsequent punishment of officials, because they refused to disclose information about the ongoing killings and were unable to take proper precautions. To back up their claims, the protesters showed a police leaflet describing the killer's appearance, which included a telephone number for communication, but it was unavailable at night. Representatives of law enforcement denied these allegations, claiming that enough was being done.

== Suspect ==
During the investigation, a black Detroit native, 29-year-old Carl Mayweather Jr., was arrested on January 27, 1976, during an attempted rape of a woman in River Rouge and subsequently considered a prime suspect. Mayweather came from a rich family and held a leadership position in a small company owned by his father, but it was revealed that he had previously been prosecuted on charges of assaulting a woman, for which he was given a suspended sentence. Since he was tall, athletic, wore size 12.5 shoes and physically matched the killer's description, after he was charged with rape and robbery in February 1976, authorities looked into the possibility that he was the Bigfoot Killer.

However, over the following months, it was established that Mayweather had a solid alibi for at least four of the murders, and thus, no further charges were brought against him, eliminating him as a suspect.

The Bigfoot Killer was never captured, and remains unidentified to this day.

== Victims ==
- Valinda Brown, 15 years old (February 16)
- Julie Brown, 16 years old (April 24)
- Regina Foshee, 19 year old (May 1)
- Naomi Hall, 22 years old (May 3)
- Eoria Char Dick, 21 years old (June 13)
- Andrea Lynn Coxton, 23 year old (July 13)
- Dorothy Holmes, 43 years old (October 19)

== Suspected victims ==
On July 27, the body of 15-year-old Wendra Curley was found in an alley. She was raped and beaten to death. She was not included in the official list of Bigfoot victims.

== See also ==
- List of homicides in Michigan
- Donald Murphy
- List of fugitives from justice who disappeared
- List of serial killers in the United States
