= Leslie Allen Williams =

American serial killer

Leslie Williams
- Born: July 4, 1953 (age 73); Detroit, Michigan, U.S.
- Convictions: First degree murder (4 counts); Kidnapping (5 counts); First degree criminal sexual conduct (6 counts); Breaking and entering (3 counts)
- Penalty: Life imprisonment without parole

Details
- Victims: 4
- Span of crimes: September 14, 1991 – January 4, 1992
- Country: United States
- State: Michigan
- Date apprehended: For the final time on May 24, 1992

Leslie Allen Williams (born July 4, 1953) is an American serial killer and sex offender convicted of the murders of four teenage girls in southern Michigan between 1991 and 1992. His case became controversial in that he was on parole at the time of the killings, bringing up flaws in the Michigan parole system.

== Early life ==
Leslie Allen Williams was born on the 4th of July 1953 in Detroit, Michigan. His mother neglected him from a young age, so he was sent to and raised by his grandparents. His first run-in with the law was in 1970, when he was 17, when he was arrested for breaking into a home in his neighborhood. He served only a year before getting out and continuing his criminal path. Over the next 12 years, Williams was repeatedly arrested for crimes that increased in severity. In September 1983, he was arrested for sexually assaulting a woman in her home, for which he was sentenced to 20 years in prison.

== Murders ==
In 1990, Williams, who had served eight years in prison since his arrest for the rape, was granted parole. Nine months later, he killed his first victim. On September 14, 1991, Williams attacked 18-year-old Kami Villanueva in her home in Oakland county. He raped and then killed her, burying her body in a shallow grave that he had dug.

On September 29, 1991, Williams attacked sisters Melissa Urbin, who was 14, and Michelle Urbin, who was 16, when the two were out walking at night. He raped and killed them, and put their bodies in his car. He drove to a secluded area and dug two shallow graves, but before burying them, Williams said he had sex with their bodies. Five months later, on January 4, 1992, he raped and killed 15-year-old Cynthia Marie Jones. Just like all the victims before, Williams buried her in a shallow grave.

== Arrest ==
On May 24, 1992, Williams attempted to rape a woman after snatching her into his car at a cemetery. Witnesses to this called the police. Williams was arrested and taken into custody, later confessing to the four murders. Over the next three weeks, Williams showed police where he had buried his victims. The case eventually made headlines and questions were raised about the Michigan parole system. The family of Melissa and Michelle Urbin blamed the parole board for their daughters' deaths.

== Conviction ==
In 1992, Williams was sentenced to life imprisonment for the four murders and the attempted rape. As of September 2024, Leslie Allen Williams is still alive, serving his sentence at the Ionia Correctional Facility.

== See also ==
- List of homicides in Michigan
- List of serial killers in the United States
