= List of homicides in Michigan =

This is a list of homicides in Michigan. This list includes notable homicides committed in the U.S. state of Michigan that have a Wikipedia article on the killing, the killer, or the victim. It is divided into three subject areas as follows:

1. Multiple homicides - homicides having multiple victims, including incidents involving race riots, mass killings involving organized crime, familicides, a school bombing, a school shooting, a post office shooting, and spree killers.
2. Serial killers - persons who murder three or more persons with the incidents taking place over more than a month and including a significant period of time between them
3. Single homicides - notable homicides involving a single fatality

== Multiple homicides ==
Listed in chronological order

Incident	Location	Date	Deaths	Description	Sources
Morris murders	Decatur	1879	2	Unsolved murders of Charles Henry Morris and Esther Jones Morris	
Seeberville Murders	Seeberville	1913-08-14	2	Shooting deaths of two striking miners during the Copper Country strike of 1913–1914	
Bath school disaster	Bath Township	1927-05-18	44	Violent attacks by Andrew Kehoe, including detonation of explosives at school building	
Milaflores Massacre	Detroit	1927	3	Shooting of three gangsters, suspected of having been perpetrated to The Purple Gang	
Collingwood Manor Massacre	Detroit	1931-09-16	3	Gang hit on three Chicago gunmen by members of The Purple Gang	
Ford Hunger March	Dearborn	1932	5	Confrontation between unemployed auto workers and Dearborn police and Ford security, five workers shot to death, more than 60 injured	
1943 Detroit race riot	Detroit	1943-06	34	Riots among black and white residents, 34 killed, 433 wounded	
Troy axe murders	Troy	1964-09-28	7	Murder of seven by father after release from mental hospital	
1967 Detroit riot	Detroit	1967-07-23-28	43	Race riot in which 43 people were killed	
Algiers Motel incident	Detroit	1967-07-25/26	3	Three civilians shot and killed by police at the Algiers Hotel during the 1967 Detroit riot, dramatized in the 2017 film Detroit	
Robison family murders	Good Hart	1968-06-25	6	Mass murder of family from suburban Detroit while vacationing at cottage	
Hazelwood massacre	Detroit	1971-06-14	8	Execution-style hit killing at house in Detroit	
Donald Goines	Highland Park	1974-10-21	2	Author of urban fiction murdered with his common-law wife in their apartment	
Ann Arbor Hospital murders	Ann Arbor	1975	10	Murders of 10 patients by intravenous administration of curare drug at VA hospital by nurses Filipina Narciso and Leonora Perez.	
Livernois–Fenkell riot	Detroit	1975-08-01	2	Bar owner shot black teenager. Mob beat to death dishwasher who was Nazi concentration camp survivor	
Rock Road massacre	Farwell	1982-02-16	7	Murder of seven members of the Post family by former Army sharpshooter	
Jeffrey Gorton	Romulus; Flint	1991-02-17; 1986-11-09	2	Convicted of rape and murder of a flight attendant and professor at UM-Flint	
Gwendolyn Graham and Cathy Wood	Walker	1987	5	Nurses aides who killed five elderly women at Alpine Manor nursing homes	
Murder of the DeLisle children	Wyandotte	1989-08-03	4	Father killed his four children (ages 10 months to 8 years) by driving station wagon into the Detroit River	
Royal Oak post office shootings	Royal Oak	1991-11-14	5	Former employee opened fire at the Royal Oak Post Office, killing four employees, then himself	
1997 Detroit shootings	Detroit	1997-03-11	4	A gunman opened fire at a Comerica branch bank, killing two employees and one customer. He was then killed by police	
Marvin Gabrion	Cedar Springs	1997	1–5	Convicted murderer, suspected serial killer	
Jack Kevorkian	Waterford Township	1998-09-17	1+	Pathologist and euthanasia proponent convicted of second-degree murder for administering lethal injection of potassium chloride to Thomas Youk	
Seth Privacky	Muskegon	1998-11-29	5	At age 18, killed his parents, brother, brother's girlfriend and grandfather	
2011 Grand Rapids shootings	Grand Rapids	2011-07-07	8	Spree killing	
Murders of Jourdan Bobbish and Jacob Kudla	Detroit	2012-07	2	Two white teenagers tortured and murdered in Detroit by two black males	
2016 Kalamazoo shootings	Kalamazoo	2016-02-20	6	Shootings at an apartment complex, car dealership and restaurant	
St. Joseph courthouse shooting	St. Joseph	2016-07-11	3	Shooting by inmate at Berrien County Courthouse, killing two bailiffs and himself	
Central Michigan University shooting	Mount Pleasant	2018-03-02	2	19-year-old student James Eric Davis Jr. shot and killed parents when they arrived to take him home for spring break	
2021 Oxford High School shooting	Oxford	2021-11-30	4	School shooting perpetrated by sophomore Ethan Crumbley	
2023 Michigan State University shooting	East Lansing	2023-02-13	3	Mass shooting at Michigan State	
2025 Grand Blanc Township church attack	Grand Blanc	2025	4	Mass shooting and arson attack on Mormon meeting house	
Karolkiewicz family murders	Grand Haven Charter Township	2026	7	Familicide committed by Kristopher Karolkiewicz.	

== Serial killers ==
Listed in chronological order by date of earliest homicide

Incident	Location	Date	Deaths	Description	Sources
Raymond Fernandez and Martha Beck	Grand Rapids	1949	3–17	Serial killer couple targeting widows and "lonely hearts"	
John Rodney McRae	St. Clair Shores	1950–1987	2–5+	Serial killer convicted of murdering two boys and prime suspect in three others	
Roland E. Clark	Multiple	1954–1967	2	Medical doctor convicted of two counts of manslaughter	
Henry Lee Lucas	Michigan and Texas	1960–1983	3 confirmed, claimed over 250	Serial killer who claimed to have killed over 250 persons	
Rudy Bladel	Multiple	1963–1978	3–7	Serial killer responsible for murders of seven railway employees, convicted of three of them	
Larry and Danny Ranes	Kalamazoo	1964	1–5	Serial killers	
Michigan Murders	Ann Arbor and Ypsilanti	1967–1969	7 +	Murders of female college students by serial killer John Norman Collins, aka the Co-Ed Killer and the Ypsilanti Ripper, in the Ann Arbor/Ypsilanti area	
Carl Eugene Watts	Michigan and Texas	1974–1982	14–100+	Serial killer known as "The Sunday Morning Slasher"	
Bigfoot Killer	Detroit	1975	7	Serial killer who raped and murdered seven girls and women between February and October 1975	
Anthony Guy Walker	Lenawee County	1975–1986	6+	Serial killer responsible for at least six murders	
Oakland County Child Killer	Oakland County	1976–1977	4+	Serial killings of children	
Donald Gene Miller	East Lansing	1977–1978	4	Serial killer known as "The East Lansing Serial Killer"	
Donald Murphy	Detroit	1979–1980	2–6+	Serial killer convicted of murdering two women, confessed to killing at least six	
Michael Darnell Harris	Various	1981–1982	4–10	Serial killer and rapist	
Richard Clarey	New Buffalo	1984-04-15	3+	German-American serial killer and Neo-Nazi sympathizer	
Benjamin Atkins	Detroit	1991–1992	11	Serial killer and rapist known as "The Woodward Corridor Killer" who murdered 11 women	
Leslie Allen Williams	Oakland and Genesee Counties	1991–1992	4	Serial killer, rapist and necrophile convicted in the deaths of four teenage girls	
John Eric Armstrong	Detroit	1992–1999	5–11+	Serial killer convicted of killing five sex workers in Detroit	
Shelly Brooks	Detroit	2001–2006	7–20+	Serial killer murdered at least seven women	
Elias Abuelazam	Genesee County	2010	1–5	Israeli suspected of 18 stabbings resulting in five deaths, convicted of one death	
Deangelo Martin	Detroit	2018–2019	4	Serial killer convicted of murdering four women and raping two others	
Kenyel Brown	Wayne County	2019–2020	6	Serial killer who committed suicide prior to trial	

== Single homicides ==
Incident	Location	Date	Description	Sources
James Strang	St. James Township	1856-06-16	Religious leader, successor to Joseph Smith, shot three times in the back	
Fabian Fournier	Bay City	c. 1875	Lumberjack killed by a blow to the head with a mallet	
Gaspar Milazzo	Detroit	1930-05-31	Organized crime figure murdered at the Vernor Highway Fish Market	
Jerry Buckley	Detroit	1930-07-23	Radio commentator shot and killed after successful campaign to recall Detroit mayor	
Tony Chebatoris	Midland	1937-09-29	Bank robber who shot and killed a bystander while trying to escape; also the only man executed in Michigan	
Carson James	Clawson	1950	Former Marine sergeant killed his father and buried him beneath a cow shed in Troy Township	
Shooting of Maurice Chenoweth	Big Bay	1952-07-31	Shooting defended by John D. Voelker and later the basis of Anatomy of a Murder	
Murder of Aziz Hermiz	Detroit	1956-02-10	Chaldean-Assyrian grocer murdered by the wife's paramour, wife found not guilty due to insanity	
Reggie Harding	Detroit	1972-09-02	Detroit Pistons player shot in the head	
Murder of Dawn Magyar	Chapin	1973-01-27	20-year-old woman abducted from a shopping center and found dead in woods	
Jimmy Hoffa	Bloomfield Township	1975-07-30	Former president of the Teamsters union disappeared from meeting with organized crime figures, body never discovered	
Richard Frederick Dixon	Casco Township	1976-01-09	Convicted of 1971 hijacking of passenger flight from Detroit to Cuba and of 1976 murder of a South Haven police officer	
Francine Hughes	Dansville	1977-03-09	Woman set fire to bed, killing abusive ex-husband, found not guilty by reason of insanity, later made into book and TV movie The Burning Bed	
Eddie Jefferson	Detroit	1979-05-09	Jazz vocalist shot by a disgruntled dancer outside Baker's Keyboard Lounge	
Killing of Vincent Chin	Highland Park	1982-06-19	Racially motivated assault and murder of Chinese American draftsman by a Chrysler plant supervisor and a laid-off autoworker	
Murder of Aundria Bowman	Hamilton	1989-03-11	Teenager who disappeared after accusing adoptive father of molesting her	
Shaka Senghor	Detroit	1991	MIT fellow convicted of shooting a man	
Death of Malice Green	Detroit	1992-11-05	Green died of blunt force trauma in assault by Detroit police officers Walter Budzyn and Larry Nevers, both officers convicted and imprisoned	
Robert Hawkins	Detroit	1993-11-28	Former Detroit Pistons player shot and killed in a crack house	
Lowell Amos	Detroit	1994-12	General Motors plant manager convicted of killing his third wife, later subject of TV movie called Black Widower	
Murder of Scott Amedure	Lake Orion	1995-03-09	Murder following appearance on The Jenny Jones Show episode "Revealing Same Sex Secret Crush", in which the victim revealed his same-sex attraction to the perpetrator	
Sharee Miller	Mount Morris	1999-11	Woman convicted of plotting the murder of her husband over the Internet with her online lover	
Killing of Kayla Rolland	Mount Morris	2000-02-29	Six-year-old girl shot at school by six-year-old classmate	
Duane Thomas	Detroit	2000-06	Welterweight boxer murdered over a drug dispute	
George Trapp	Detroit	2002-01	NBA player stabbed in stomach in fight with roommate	
Nancy Seaman	Oakland County	2005-05-10	Former teacher killed her husband with a hatchet, convicted despite claim of history of marital abuse	
Proof	Detroit	2006-04-11	Rapper shot and killed while playing billiards at a club	
Murder of Laura Dickinson	Ypsilanti	2006-12-13	Eastern Michigan University student murdered in her dormitory room, scandal led to firing of university's president	
Murder of Tara Lynn Grant	Macomb County	2007-02-09	Murdered and dismembered by her husband	
Murder of Jodi Parrack	Constantine	2007-11-08	11-year-old girl kidnapped while riding her bicycle	
Murder of Jim Pouillon	Owosso	2009-09-11	Activist shot while protesting against abortion in front of Owosso High School	
Murder of Jamar Pinkney Jr.	Detroit	2009-11-16	Execution-style shooting of 15-year-old boy by his father	
Killing of Aiyana Jones	Detroit	2010-05-16	Seven-year old girl shot and killed by police during raid, jury deadlock on involuntary manslaughter charge against officer	
Death of Jane Bashara	Detroit	2012-01-24	Grosse Pointe marketing executive strangled by hitman hired by husband and left in back seat of her Mercedes-Benz SUV in an alley in Detroit	
Murder of Robert Cipriano	Farmington Hills	2012-04-16	Murder committed by 19-year-old adopted son	
Murder of Jessica Heeringa	Norton Shores	2013-04-26	25-year-old woman disappeared while working at an Exxon gas station	
Murder of Renisha McBride	Dearborn Heights	2013-11-02	19-year-old woman crashed her car while intoxicated and was shot when knocking at a nearby house seeking assistance	
Killing of Collin Rose	Detroit	2016-11-22	Wayne State police officer shot after stopping a bicyclist	
Robert Eddins	Detroit	2016-12-20	NFL linebacker murdered in Detroit	
2017 Interstate 75 rock-throwing deaths	Vienna Township	2017-10-18	Six-pound rock thrown by teenagers crashed through van windshield and killed passenger	
Killing of Patrick Lyoya	Grand Rapids	2022-04-22	26-year-old refugee from Congo shot and killed during scuffle following vehicle stop	
Murder of Jim Matthews	Chesterfield Township	2022-09-23	News-radio anchor beaten to death by friend of his live-in girlfriend	
Killing of Samantha Woll	Detroit	2023-10-21	President of Detroit synagogue stabbed to death	
Killing of Ruby Garcia		2024-03-22	Woman killed by boyfriend, Presidential candidate Donald Trump used it as an example of "migrant crime"	
