= Michael Darnell Harris =

Convicted American serial killer (born 1963)

- Born: March 7, 1963 (age 63); Muskegon Heights, Michigan, U.S.
- Other name: Michael Stiggles
- Conviction: Murder x4
- Penalty: Life imprisonment x4

Details
- Victims: 4–10
- Span of crimes: 1981–1982
- Country: United States
- State: Michigan
- Date apprehended: December 7, 1982
- Imprisoned at: Muskegon Correctional Facility, Muskegon, Michigan

Michael Darnell Harris (born March 7, 1963) is an American serial killer and rapist who has been convicted and sentenced to life imprisonment for four murders and one rape committed in Michigan from 1981 to 1982, but is a suspect in several others. Harris has insisted on his innocence since his conviction, and in the mid-2010s, DNA testing put his guilt into question. According to his attorneys, his first conviction influenced all of Harris's subsequent trials, prompting the Michigan State Police to launch an investigation into alleged falsified evidence against him. In the end, his remaining convictions were upheld, but Harris is still considered innocent by some.

== Early years ==
Michael Darnell Harris was born on March 7, 1963, in Muskegon Heights, Michigan, the eldest of five children. He spent most of his childhood in Muskegon, where he claimed to have been raised in a good family. In 1973, his mother found a high-paying job at a veterans hospital in Ann Arbor, where the family soon moved in to live with a stepfather. Since the move, Harris began to frequently argue with his stepfather, who became increasingly aggressive and physically abusive. In the late 1970s, Harris dropped out of school and began spending a lot of time on the streets, sleeping in the homes of friends and acquaintances, as well as homeless shelters. In 1980, he left Ann Arbor and moved to Lansing, where he met a woman who bore him a daughter. For the next two years, Harris struggled financially, leading him to do jobs involving low-skilled labor and to live a vagrant lifestyle.

== Arrest, investigation and trial ==
On December 7, 1982, Harris was arrested at a homeless shelter in Jackson for breaking into the property of 68-year-old Lenora Nayrhardt, whom he was accused of beating and raping. Soon after his arrest, he was proposed as a suspect in the murders of 85-year-old Margorie Upson and 84-year-old Louise Koebnick, who were raped and strangled on September 28 and 30 of that year, respectively, in Ypsilanti. Authorities from the Lansing area also suspected him in a series of rapes and strangulations in their city:

- Edna Ryckaert (78), October 18, 1980
- Edith Crossette (83), February 14, 1981
- Ula Curdy (79), November 2, 1981
- Denise Swanson (79), November 30, 1981

In addition to these, Harris was also among the suspects in the murder of 91-year-old Florence Bell, who lived near Upson and was found with her throat slit in her home on January 8, 1982. The reason for this suspicion was the fact that, at the time of the killings in Lansing, Harris lived in the city, which stopped right after he left in October. Not long after, similar killings started to occur in Jackson, where he moved to.

On December 14, during a visual identification procedure, Harris was identified as the rapist of Nayrhardt. He pleaded not guilty to the crime, claiming that he was in a homeless shelter at the time, which was backed up by an attendant who worked there. On January 12, 1983, he was charged with Curdy's murder after his fingerprints were found on a chair in the room where she was killed. At the request of his attorneys, he was sent for a psychiatric evaluation at the Center for Forensic Psychiatry in Saline, which declared him sane in March of that year. Soon after, he was also charged with Swanson's murder.

On March 28, 1983, Harris went on trial for the assault and rape of Nayrhardt. During the proceedings, the prosecutor's office presented evidence which showed that the perpetrator's blood type and seminal fluid matched Harris, as well as cat hairs found on his clothing that matched those of the two cats in the woman's home. In addition, nineteen people, including the victim herself, identified Harris as the attacker. On April 4, he attempted to hang himself in his cell using a rope made from the torn fabric of his mattress. The rope was unable to support Harris's weight, and after it broke, other inmates called in staff, who transported him to the Ypsilanti Regional Psychiatric Hospital for treatment for depression.

On May 19, Harris was found guilty of assaulting and raping Nayrhardt, but was initially deemed incompetent to stand trial for the murder charges. He was eventually sentenced to 60-to-90 years' imprisonment; while his sentence was read out, he showed no emotion. After undergoing treatment, Harris went to trial for the murders of Swanson and Curdy in July 1983. On September 27, he was found guilty of Curdy's murder and sentenced to life imprisonment without parole on October 24. An identical verdict was handed down in the Swanson trial on November 3, for which he was given another life term without parole.

== Imprisonment, new revelations and current status ==
Following his conviction, Harris was transported to the Muskegon Correctional Facility to serve out his sentence. In the late 1990s, DNA testing was performed on seminal fluid samples recovered from the bodies of Upson, Koebnick, and Bell, all of which matched Harris's genotypic profile. As a result, he was charged in their murders in December 2001, with prosecutors presenting implicating evidence at all trials against him. In the end, Harris was convicted and given two additional life terms for Upson and Koebnick's killings, but was not tried for the Bell murder due to his multiple life sentences.

Throughout the years that followed, Harris continued to insist on his innocence and regularly appealed, accusing the police and forensic experts of fabricating evidence against him by placing his blood samples on items found at the crime scenes and then isolating his DNA. He also argued that the contaminated items, along with his blood samples, were not shown to the jury at his trials, and his attorneys' motions for independent DNA testing were denied. However, each of these appeals was dismissed, as they were found to be without merit.

In 2015, Harris asked the Ingham County District Judge Rosemarie Aquilina for DNA testing to be performed on the seminal fluids found on Ula Curdy's belt, which investigators believe the perpetrator left behind. The testing began in early 2016, with the results revealing that the DNA matched another individual, and not Harris. This caused public outrage, causing the case to garner new publicity and raising questions about his guilt. The Michigan State Police later launched an investigation to see if Harris tampered with the evidence, and the Ingham County District Court scheduled a hearing for September 23, 2016, to review new evidence that might overturn his conviction in Curdy's murder. In addition to the test results, Harris's attorneys insisted that the conviction be overturned because the chair found at the crime scene, on which Harris's palm prints were supposedly found, had been returned to the police by family members of the murdered woman before the trial began, instead of being retained as physical evidence during it. Accusations of racial bias were also leveled, with some of Harris's supporters pointing out that the jury consisted entirely of white people.

In early 2017, the Ingham County State Attorney's Office petitioned for a second DNA test, which subsequently found Harris's DNA at the Curdy crime scene, prompting Justice Aquilina to dismiss the evidentiary hearing on September 27, thereby preventing the possibility that Harris could be granted a new trial. He again reasserted his innocence and accused both the police and the prosecutor's office of yet again falsifying the evidence. Backed by his attorneys, Harris filed a motion demanding that Aquilina schedule a hearing in which Harris and his attorneys could question the crime lab technicians who worked on the case. However, Aquilina denied this request, stating that she had no authority to do so because the DNA tests proved Harris's culpability in Curdy's murder.

== See also ==
- List of homicides in Michigan
- List of serial killers in the United States
