= Richard Clarey =

German-American murderer (born 1960)

- Born: Richard Norbert Clarey, Jr. July 18, 1960 (age 66); Wiesbaden, West Germany
- Motive: Neo-Nazism, Anti-Americanism
- Conviction: Murder x3
- Penalty: Life imprisonment x3

Details
- Victims: 3+
- Span of crimes: April 15 – 18, 1984
- Country: United States, possibly Germany
- State: Michigan
- Date apprehended: April 18, 1984
- Imprisoned at: Carson City Correctional Facility https://www.michigan.gov/corrections/Prisons/Carson-City-Correctional-Facility

Richard Norbert Clarey Jr. (born July 18, 1960) is a German-American Neo-Nazi, convicted murderer and self-confessed serial killer. He was convicted for the murders of three men in Michigan in 1984, but later confessed to being responsible for over 100 unsubstantiated murders, starting at the age of 15 in his native West Germany.

== Early life ==
Clarey was born on July 18, 1960, in Wiesbaden, West Germany, the elder son of an American officer from Kalamazoo, Michigan, stationed in the city and his German wife, Hilde. His younger brother, Paul, was born in 1963. Richard Sr. was rarely at home to care for the children, and so, the two brothers were doted upon by their mother, who allowed them to do whatever they wanted. Richard Jr. became a delinquent who detested going to school, spending his time drinking alcohol and abusing drugs, in particular LSD. In his dreams, he began to hear voices of prominent Nazi figures who told him that he had a "mission to kill all Americans", after he had read Adolf Hitler's Mein Kampf. As a teenager, he moved in with an aunt in Oregon, before settling in his father's native city of Kalamazoo.

== Crimes ==
Clarey first came onto police radar at age 19, when he and 28-year-old Flavio Lengs robbed a Kalamazoo man who picked the two up in his car on December 18, 1979. They stole his wallet and stabbed him in the back, pushing him out of the vehicle before speeding off. The man's injuries proved to be non-fatal and he called the police, telling them that his assailants were breaking through roadblocks on the I-94, just outside Benton Harbor. Clarey and Lengs were shot at and chased by several patrol cars, driving at about 110 mph for about 15 miles. Clarey crashed the car into a utility pole in Benton Harbor's central business district. The two criminals were apprehended by police officers and sent to nearby Bronson Methodist Hospital, where the former had to be treated for head injuries and an LSD overdose. Both were imprisoned for a few years, before they were let out on the streets again.

On January 3, 1984, Clarey was paroled from the Kalamazoo Correctional Center, where he had served on charges of breaking and entering. On April 15, he accepted a ride from acquaintance, 36-year-old Robert Baranski. When they were alone, Clarey shot Robert and later dumped his body at a pier in South Haven.

He then picked up another man known to him, 17-year-old John Asher, planning to drive down to California. Along the way, however, Richard lost control of the car and crashed into a ditch near a I-94 freeway rest stop outside New Buffalo. Needing another vehicle, the pair shot 59-year-old Floyd Holmes, a traveling salesman from Santa Monica, California, who was visiting family members in Detroit. They tried to start up his truck but failed. They then set their sights on another truck, belonging to 28-year-old Dean R. Bultema, a Wimbledon, North Dakota, resident who was towing an antique car that he planned to sell in Owosso. Richard shot Bultema as well. The pair managed to start up the truck, but got stuck in mud at the rest stop. Clarey fled on foot, while Asher was arrested at the scene.

More than 30 officers from both Michigan and Indiana were dispatched to search for the fugitive, utilizing police helicopters and bloodhounds. He was arrested by authorities in the attic of a garage in La Porte, Indiana, without incident a few hours later.

== Trial and imprisonment ==
The day after his arrest, Clarey confessed to the Baranski killing, indicating that he had dumped the body in a lake near South Haven. He was arraigned on murder charges for the deaths of Holmes and Bultema, while Asher was held for carrying a concealed weapon, with his bail bond set at $25,000. In the meantime, a search was conducted to find Baranski's body, which was found a month later, washed ashore on a beach in southwestern Michigan.

Before his trial, Clarey was ordered to undertake a competency hearing at the Center for Forensic Psychiatry in Ypsilanti, where he was examined by researchers Elissa P. Bendek and Russell C. Petrella over the course of several days. In the end, it was revealed that while Clarey harbored great resentment towards Americans because of his rough childhood and a girlfriend being impregnated by an American, he was aware of the nature of his actions and was reasonably intelligent. According to Bendek, he was aware that he could plead insanity but refrained from doing so as he believed that he wasn't of an unsound mind.

After Clarey was ruled competent to stand trial, his trial was scheduled for December 1984. During the trial, more than 50 people testified: among them was psychologist Leonard Donk, who said that the defendant suffered from an array of disorders, most prominently periodic schizophrenia; another was Raymond Matthews, who revealed that on the night before Holmes' and Bultema's killings, Clary had approached his truck, tried to break in, and shot a gun at him.

A videotaped confession further proved Clarey's guilt. When he took the stand, he claimed to have realized that he needed help. On December 21, 1984, he was found guilty of the Holmes-Butelma murders, and received mandatory life imprisonment sentences.

Two months later, Clarey was put on a second trial for the murder of Baranski. Clarey plead guilty to the murder, but did so in a diminished capacity plea, receiving another term of life imprisonment. Two years after his conviction, he appealed two of his murder convictions, but the appeal was rejected by the appeallate court. To this day, Richard Clarey remains incarcerated at the Ionia Correctional Facility.

== Confessions ==
According to Leonard Donk's report, Clarey was driven by a belief that the blood spilled by his victims would be for a better life, with him confessing to 150 murders total, claiming to have killed people since he was 15 and still lived in West Germany. In addition, he claimed that he felt "excited and detached" during the killings, and since he followed Hitler's doctrines, he often targeted Jews, Blacks, Asians and other minorities. His confessions were investigated by several states along the West Coast, but none of his claims were matched to any open murder cases. Donk, who described Clarey in his report as "psychotic, paranoid, psychopathic and schizophrenic; appearing to have suffered brain damage from a long history of drug and alcohol abuse", he also noted his belief that Clarey did indeed kill more people than what he was convicted of.

== See also ==
- List of homicides in Michigan
- List of serial killers in the United States
