= Troy axe murders =

1964 mass murder in Michigan

- Photograph of murderer William Gravlin
- Location: 2121 Garson in Troy, Michigan, US
- Date: 28 September 1964; 62 years ago
- Attack type: Mass murder
- Weapons: Double-edged axe; Hammer; Shotgun
- Victims: 7
- Perpetrator: William Gravlin

The Troy axe murders were a familicide of seven individuals in Troy, Michigan, United States, in September 1964.

William G. Gravlin (June 4, 1934 – March 1, 1994), a Royal Oak fireman, was convicted of slashing his cousin's wife in 1961 and was committed to the Pontiac State Hospital. After his release, Gravlin's wife asked for a divorce. Several days later, Gravlin killed his wife, their five-year-old daughter, and his five stepchildren. Gravlin killed six of the victims using a double-edged axe; he killed his daughter with a shotgun. He left handwritten apology notes on each of the bodies.

Gravlin confessed to the killings but was initially found incompetent to stand trial and spent three years at the Ionia State Hospital for the Criminally Insane. In 1968, after being found competent, Gravlin was tried, convicted, and sentenced to life imprisonment.

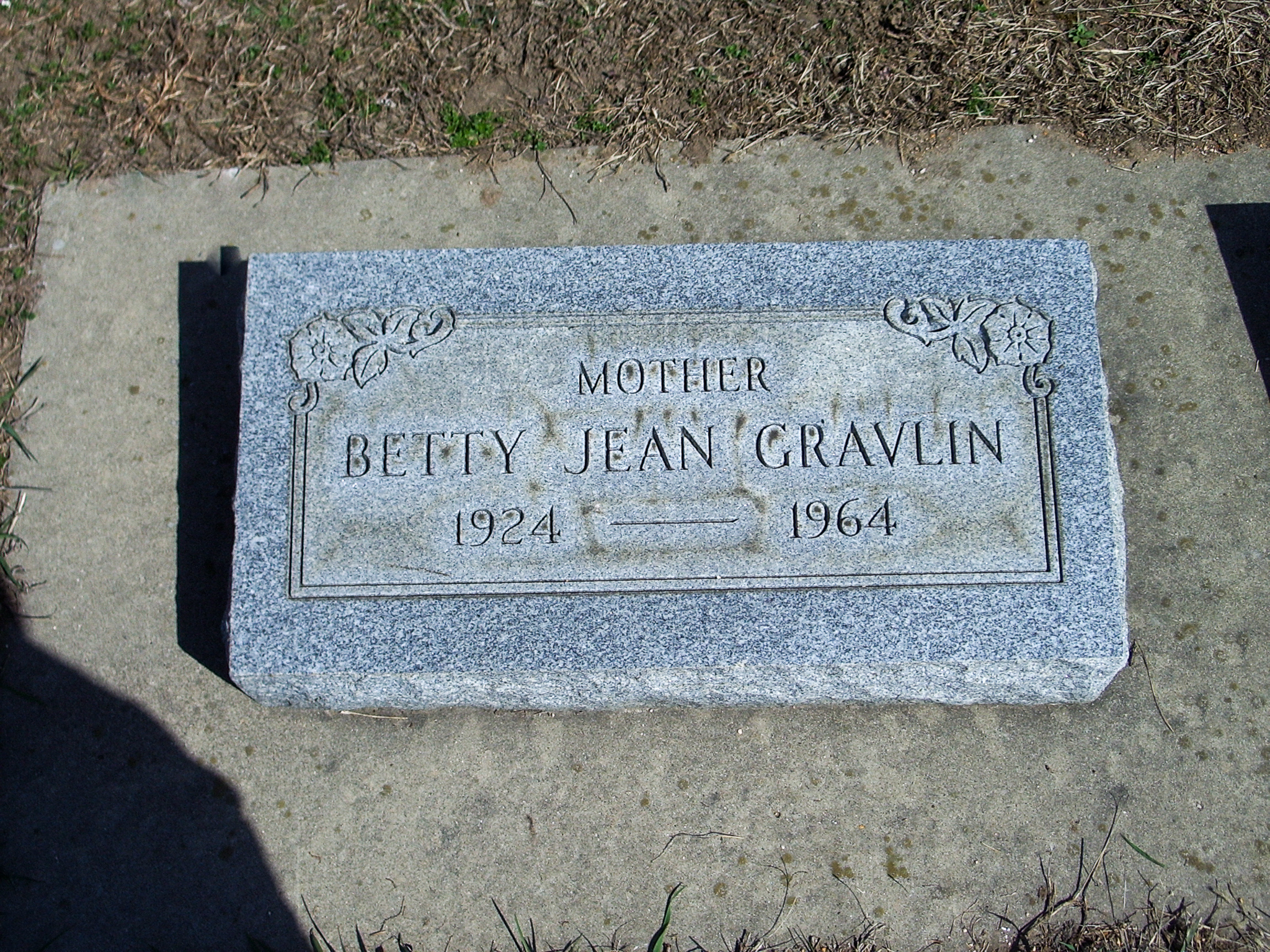
Tombstone of Betty Jean Gravlin, murdered by her husband William G Gravlin, Perrin Cemetery, Troy, Michigan. April 2005

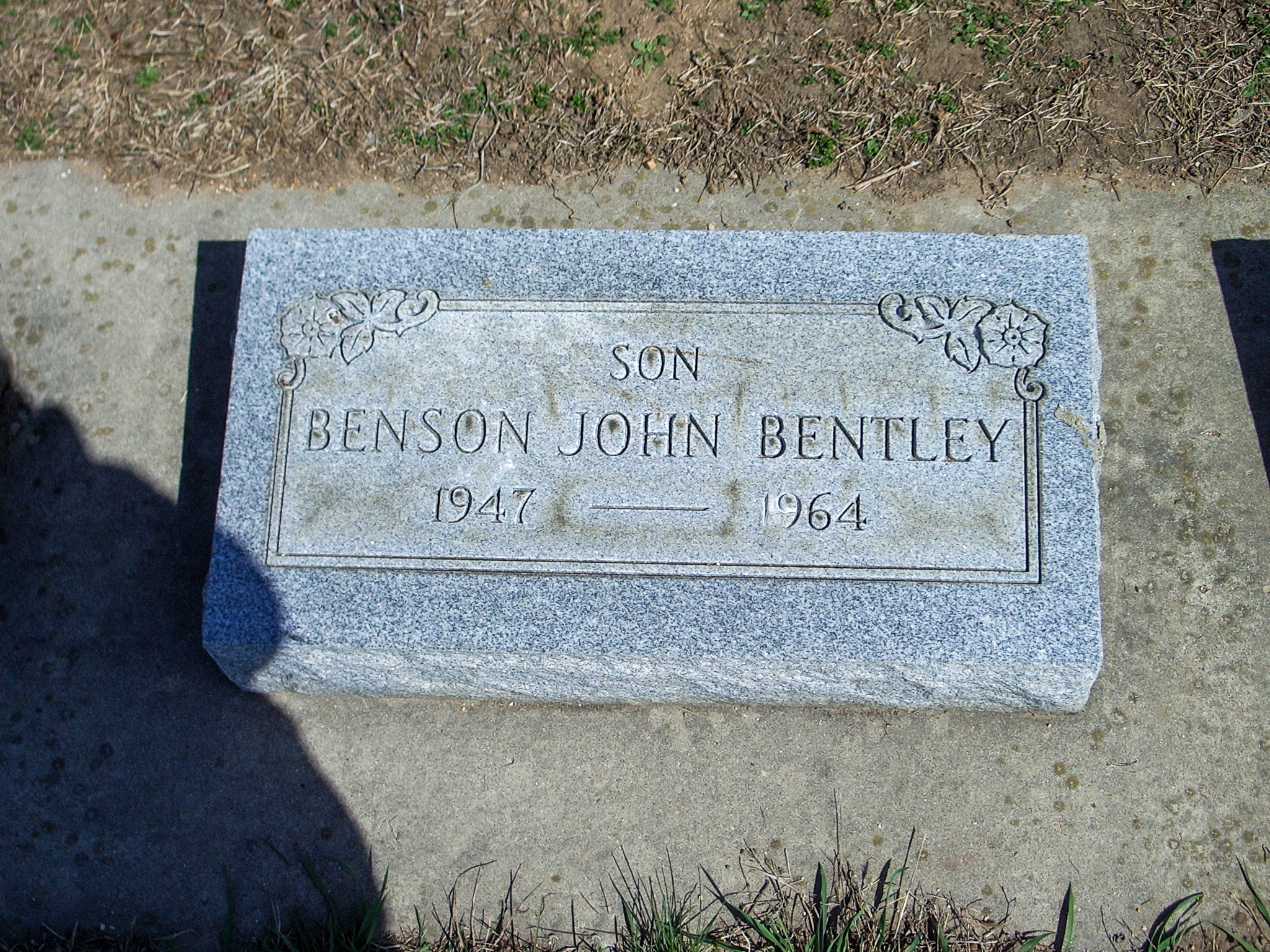
Tombstone of Benson John Bentley, murdered by his stepfather William G. Gravlin. Perrin Cemetery, Troy, Michigan. April 2005

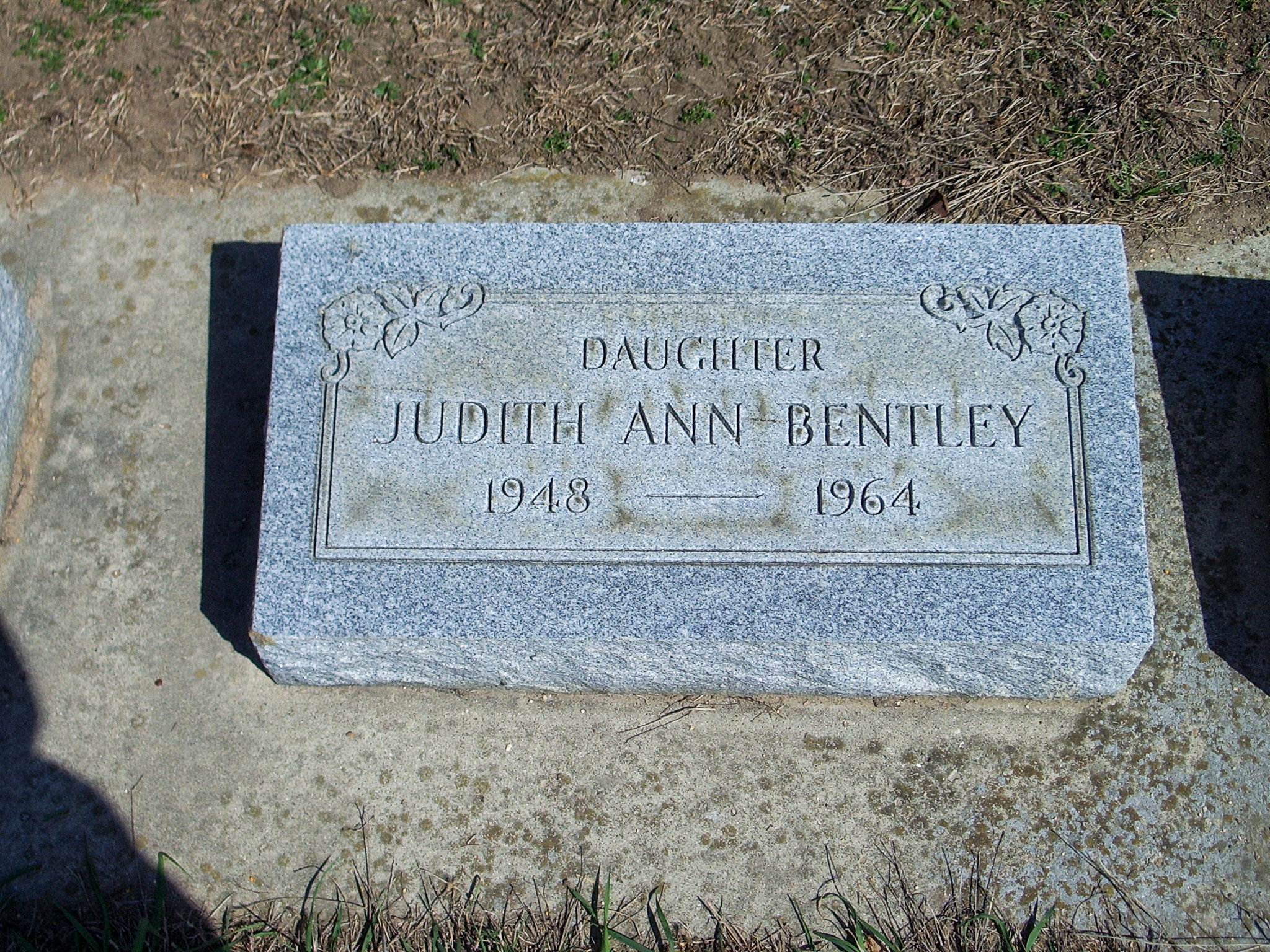
Tombstone of Judith Ann Bentley, murdered by her stepfather William G Gravlin, Perrin Cemetery, Troy, Michigan. April 2005

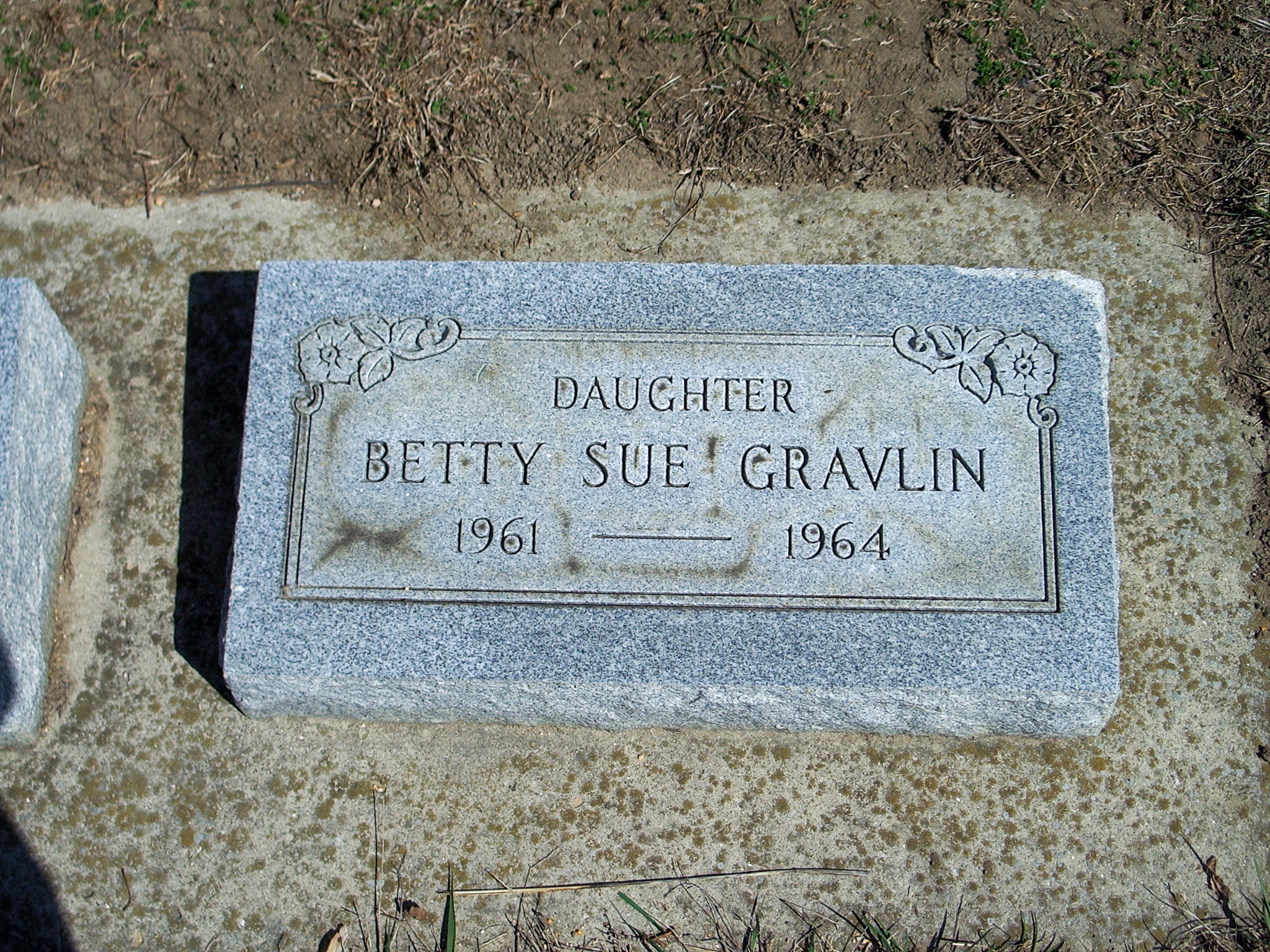
Tombstone of Betty Sue Gravlin, murdered by her father, William G Gravlin, Perrin Cemetery, Troy, Michigan. April 2005

== Background ==
=== Gravlin and Bette ===
William Glen Gravlin was married to Bette Jean Bentley (née Mettetal). Bette had been married previously and had five children with her first husband, John Joseph Bentley. Gravlin and Bette had a daughter, Betty Sue.

Gravlin became a fireman in Royal Oak, Michigan, in June 1959.

=== 1961 knife attack ===
In August 1961, Gravlin slashed his cousin's wife with a knife on a Monday afternoon. Gravlin used the knife to force the woman and her four-year-old daughter out of their house at 1058 Henrietta, Troy, Michigan. The woman screamed, and Gravlin then slashed her behind her left ear, a wound that required five stitches.

Gravlin was arrested the following day walking without shoes along Rochester Road, near 17 Mile Road, in Troy. Gravlin said he had been drinking and did not recall slashing the woman. He said that he purchased the knife on the morning of the attack. Gravlin was sentenced to three years of probation and committed to the Pontiac State Hospital for treatment.

=== Gravlin's release ===
Gravlin was initially released from Pontiac State Hospital on "convalescent leave" in April 1962. Having lost his firefighter job, he went to work on an assembly line operated by Temprite Products Corp. in Birmingham, Michigan. A representative of the company described Gravlin as "a good, steady worker." After an incident in which Gravlin was drunk, his wife had him brought back to the mental hospital in February 1963. He was released again on convalescent leave in July 1963, and he was officially released in July 1964.

A neighbor recalled that Gravlin drank a lot, that he would "go wild" when he was drunk, and that his wife was "scared to death" of him. A week before the murders, Gravlin's wife asked for a divorce. Gravlin moved out of the house and moved in with his mother in Clawson, Michigan.

== Murders ==
On Sunday night, September 27, 1964, Gravlin, age 30 at the time, took a taxi from Clawson to a location approximately 250 yards from his family's home at 2121 Garson in Troy, Michigan. The taxi driver dropped off Gravlin at 11 p.m.

In the early morning hours of Monday, September 28, 1964, Gravlin used a large, double-bladed axe and a hammer to murder his wife and five stepchildren. He also murdered his daughter, Bette Sue; unlike the other victims, she was killed by a shotgun blast. A pathologist placed the time of death at approximately 2 a.m. The axe was found under the house with human blood and hair on the blade. The blood-stained hammer was found in a bathroom.

The seven victims were:

1. Bette Gravlin, age 40 – Gravlin's wife
2. Betty Sue Gravlin, age 5 – Gravlin's daughter
3. Benson John Bentley, age 17 – Gravlin's stepson
4. Judith Ann Bentley, age 16 – Gravlin's stepdaughter
5. Dorrie Oral Bentley, age 15 – Gravlin's stepdaughter
6. Paula Allene Bentley, age 12 – Gravlin's stepdaughter
7. Walter Johnson Bentley, age 10 – Gravlin's stepson

Each of the bodies was covered with a blanket. Three of the victims (Judith Ann, Dorrie and Walter) were found in the living room. The bodies of his wife and two of his step-children (Ben and Paula) were found in bedrooms. His daughter Betty Sue was found in the bathroom with a Bible; the bathtub was half full of water "stained deep red with blood."

Gravlin left notes of apology, written on torn scraps of paper towel, on each of the bodies. To his five-year-old daughter, Gravlin wrote, "Susie, I love you with all my heart." The note to his wife was partially illegible, but read in part, "Bette, I loved you and Susie most of all and I can't change it. But if I could, you know the answer. Please forgive me and let me just be you ..." According to an Associated Press account, the notes read, "I love you, I'm sorry, it couldn't be helped."

== Immediate aftermath and arrest ==
After the murders, Gravlin walked to a gas station located half a mile from the home at the corner of 15 Mile Road and John R. An attendant at the station, Robert Herston, testified that Gravlin arrived at the gas station at 6:30 a.m., used a telephone, and drank between four and six bottles of Coca-Cola.

At approximately 8 a.m., Gravlin then took a taxi back to Clawson. He tried to kill himself, initially by ingesting sleeping pills and whiskey. When that failed, he purchased tile-and-bathroom cleaner with the intention of drinking it but, unable to do so, poured the corrosive liquid on himself, causing chemical burns to his chest. Later in the day, a motorist, Earl Stone of Hazel Park, saw Gravlin walking down the street and stopped to see if he needed help. Gravlin told the man he had killed his family and asked the man to call the police. Madison Heights police officer, Ronald F. Pearce, responded, saw Gravlin walking down a dirt road and asked Gravlin what happened. Gravlin told Pearce he had killed his family and asked to go to the police station.

Police went to the home and found the bodies. Troy Police Chief Forrest O. Fisher testified he had never seen such a crime scene. Dr. Richard E. Olson, the chief pathologist who examined the bodies at the scene, said, "It exceeded anything I have ever seen except in warfare."

== Legal proceedings ==
=== Pretrial developments ===
At his immediate arraignment on September 28, at the Troy Municipal Court, Gravlin pleaded guilty. Notwithstanding Gravlin's desire to plead guilty, the judge, Charles H. Losey, entered a plea of not guilty.

At a competency hearing held in October 1964, the Court heard testimony from Dr. Abraham Tauber who had first examined Gravlin in 1961. Tauber testified that Gravlin had schizophrenia and was not fully able to assist in his defense. According to Tauber, Gravlin talked about his deceased family members "in the present tense" and had previously attempted suicide by drinking a solvent. A second psychiatrist, Dr. George S. Evseeff, testified that, despite having what appeared to be a psychotic character disorder, Gravlin was able to assist his attorney. Oakland Circuit Judge James Thorburn ruled on October 29 that Gravlin was competent to stand trial. However, at the request of Gravlin's attorney, he was transferred to Washtenaw County Jail to be examined further by two University of Michigan psychiatrists.

On November 19, 1964, the Gravlin home was badly damaged in an arson fire. Oil was poured on the living room floor, and the fire damaged both the living room and one of the bedrooms.

In early January 1965, Gravlin again attempted suicide by rubbing his wrists across a broken window. Gravlin admitted to the suicide attempt which he attributed to harassment by other inmates.

On January 14, 1965, after reviewing the report of a second psychiatric commission finding Gravlin was not competent to stand trial, Judge Thornburn ordered Gravlin committed to the Ionia State Hospital for the Criminally Insane.

In November 1967, A. A. Birzagalis, the medical superintendent at Ionia State Hospital reported to the court that Gravlin was then capable of understanding the charges. After hearing testimony from psychiatrists, Judge Thorburn ruled in December 1967 that Gravlin was competent to stand trial.

=== Trial ===
In January 1968, Gravlin's attorneys waived his right to jury trial, and the matter was set for a bench trial before Judge Thorburn. The trial occurred at the Oakland County Circuit Court in Pontiac, Michigan, and lasted more than three weeks. The trial was limited to the death of Gravlin's 16-year-old stepdaughter Judith Ann Bentley. Dr. William Gordon, a Detroit psychiatrist, offered his opinion that Gravlin knew the difference between right and wrong, wanted to kill, and did what he wanted. Judge Thornburn ruled that, while the slayings were "a product of defendant's mental disease," he was legally sane and knew the difference between right and wrong at the time.

Gravlin was sentenced by Judge Thornburn in April 1968 to mandatory life in prison.

=== Appeal ===
Gravlin appealed on the ground that the sentencing judge should have given him credit for the time spent in custody. In March 1974, the Michigan Court of Appeal ruled that a mental hospital is a place of confinement and that Gravlin was entitled to credit against his sentence for the three years spent in the mental hospital.

== See also ==
- List of homicides in Michigan
