= Lou Scott =

American long-distance runner

Personal information
- Full name: Louis Cohn "Lou" Scott
- Born: September 4, 1945 (age 80) Detroit, Michigan, U.S.
- Education: Arizona State University
- Height: 1.70 m (5 ft 7 in)
- Weight: 68 kg (150 lb)

Sport
- Sport: Athletics
- Event(s): Mile, 5,000 meters 10,000 meters, 25Km road run
- Club: Motor City Striders

Achievements and titles
- Personal best(s): Mile – 4:04.9 (1964); 2 miles – 8:35.2 (1967); 5000 – 13:46.4 (1968)
Medal record
Representing the United States
Pan American Games
Silver medal – second place	1967 Winnipeg	5000 m

Louis Cohn "Lou" Scott (born September 4, 1945, in Detroit, Michigan) is an American long-distance runner who competed in the 1968 Summer Olympics. He won a silver medal at the 1967 Pan American Games.

He continues to run, showing up in a local Senior Olympics race. Running for Eastern High School, he was the Michigan State Champion in the mile in 1962 and 1963. He was also the 1962 state Cross Country Champion. His 4:11.3 in the summer of 1963 was the Michigan state record for seven years.

In 1985, Scott was a school teacher, and also competed in the Masters National Outdoor Track and Field Championship.
