= Killing of Collin Rose =

2016 shooting of a police officer in Detroit, Michigan

Murder of Collin Rose
- Location: Detroit, Michigan, U.S.
- Date: November 22, 2016 c. 6:32 p.m. – (ET)
- Attack type: Shooting
- Weapon: Handgun
- Deaths: 1
- Victim: Collin Rose

On November 22, 2016, Collin Rose, a police officer with the Wayne State University Police Department who worked with police dogs, was shot to death in Detroit, Michigan. The shooting occurred following an attempt by the officer to stop and question a bicyclist riding near the Wayne State University campus in an area which was experiencing an increase in thefts. The bicyclist was arrested and charged, but later released due to lack of evidence. Rose, who was shot in the head, died the following day at 5:45 p.m. at Detroit Receiving Hospital. He was surrounded by his family and close friends while his co-workers and fellow law enforcement waited in the hospital lobby.

Rose was the first Wayne State University Police Department officer to die in the line of duty. He was also the fifth police officer shot in the United States within three days.

== Event ==
At 6:31 p.m. ET on Tuesday, November 22, 2016, Rose radioed into dispatch requesting backup and saying he was approaching a bicyclist at 3650 Lincoln Street. Arriving back-up officers found Rose on the ground and with a gunshot wound to the head. The officers loaded Rose into the back of a patrol car and rushed him to Detroit Receiving Hospital, where he was taken into surgery.

Shortly after, the bicyclist was named a person of interest in the shooting. He was taken into custody at approximately 9:45 p.m., following a search involving multiple police agencies and helicopters.

Following surgery, Rose was on a ventilator and listed as being in a critical, but stable, condition. However, he died from his injuries the following day, November 23, at approximately 5:35 p.m. at Detroit Receiving Hospital. At the time of his death, he was surrounded by family and friends. More than 150 other police officers stood vigil in the lobby.

== Victim ==
Collin James Rose
- Born: April 1, 1987
- Died: November 23, 2016 (aged 29); Detroit, Michigan
- Education: Ferris State University
- Police career
- Department: 2010: New Baltimore Police Department c. 2010: Richland Police Department; 2011 – 2016: Wayne State University Police Department
- Service years: 2010 – November 23, 2016
- Rank: 2010: Cadet c. 2010: Police Officer; 2016 (posthumously): Sergeant
- Badge no.: 128
- Awards: Wayne State University Police Department Citation of Valor
- Memorials: Rose Dog Park in Detroit, MI, Michigan Fallen Heroes Memorial in Pontiac, MI, National Law Enforcement Officers Memorial in Washington D.C., Wayne County First Responders Memorial in Plymouth, MI, Memorial bench at SPCA of Southwest Michigan in Kalamazoo, MI, memorial mug at Baffin Brewery in St. Clair Shores, MI,

Collin James Rose (April 1, 1987 – November 23, 2016) was a police officer who specialized in working with police dogs, posthumously promoted to Sergeant, with the Wayne State University Police Department at Wayne State University.

He had been with the department for five years, and wore badge number 128. For three years he had been working with Clyde, the only narcotics-sniffing Rottweiler in the Great Lakes region. He had recently begun working with an additional dog, Wolverine, a German Shorthaired Pointer named in honor of Detroit Police Department Officer Patrick "Wolverine" Hill, who died in the line of duty in 2013.

Rose was born on April 1, 1987, and grew up in the Kalamazoo, Michigan area. He graduated from Gull Lake High School in 2006, where he was captain of the football team and had a summer job at a ferry service taking passengers across the Straits of Mackinac to Mackinac Island. He also interned for the Richland Police Department in Richland, Michigan. Rose then attended and graduated from Ferris State University's criminal justice program in 2010, where he was a member of the Sigma Phi Epsilon fraternity.

He was a Cadet with the New Baltimore Police Department in New Baltimore, Michigan in 2010. He then worked part-time for the Richland Police Department before joining the Wayne State University Police Department a few months later in March 2011.

Rose was a supporter of efforts related to fallen police officers. He regularly attended funerals and memorials around the state. In 2013 he traveled to Boston for the funeral of Massachusetts Institute of Technology Police Officer Sean Collier. In 2014 he traveled to Scranton, Penn. for the funeral of Pennsylvania State Police Trooper Bryon Dickson. Rose rode in the Police Unity Tour beginning in 2015. He had just started fundraising with his teammate in early November. He was slated to ride again in May 2017. He proposed to his fiancée at the National Law Enforcement Officer's Memorial following the 2016 ride. He was also a member of the Metro Detroit Schutzhund Club, which trains dogs using the Schutzhund method.

He was a resident of St. Clair Shores, Michigan, and attended the city's St. Joan of Arc Catholic Church. Rose was engaged to be married in October 2017. At the time of his death, his fiancée worked with Detroit Dog Rescue, a local animal rescue group.

Rose was pursuing a master's degree in dispute resolution and was one class away from completion. He had volunteered at the Wayne Mediation Center in Dearborn. Following his death, Wayne State University President M. Roy Wilson announced he would be receiving his master's degrees posthumously at the university's next commencement ceremony.

He was 29 years old when he died. While two other Wayne State officers have been shot in the line of duty since the department's formation in 1966, Rose was the first line of duty death. He was the third police officer who worked in Detroit to die in the line of duty since September 2016, and the fifth police officer shot in the United States within three days.

A viewing and memorial for Rose was held at Ford Field on November 29, 2016. His funeral was held at St. Joan of Arc Catholic Church in St. Clair Shores on December 1, 2016.

== Investigation ==
The bicyclist Rose was pursuing, who was taken into custody soon after the shooting, was charged with first-degree murder, murder of a police officer, being a felon in possession of a firearm, three felony firearm charges, and being a habitual offender. However, the charges were dropped on December 7, 2016. Wayne County Prosecutor Kym Worthy announced the person was no longer a suspect. Police also announced they were continuing their search for suspects.

On March 15, 2017, two Detroit Police Department officers were shot and wounded after stopping to question a man, Raymond Durham, who was walking in the street near Tillman and Ash. The Third Precinct officers who were shot exchanged gunfire with Durham, striking him in the leg and arm. They were transported to Detroit Receiving Hospital by responding officers and admitted with non-life-threatening injuries. Responding officers established a perimeter and located Durham hiding near Michigan and Vinewood. Durham was transported to Henry Ford Hospital for treatment of his gunshot wounds. A sample of his DNA was submitted to the state police forensic science laboratory to check against the trace evidence left at the scene where Rose was shot. The investigation is still ongoing in both shootings, but it is believed that Durham is in fact the person who shot and killed Collin Rose. Durham was arraigned on the shooting of the Third Precinct officers and pending initial court proceedings. The murder investigation continues, but Detroit Police Chief James Craig said during a press conference on March 17 that scientists found a "positive DNA match between Durham and the suspect in Rose's murder." Chief Craig also added, "We are calling him (Durham) a suspect in this matter, so that is a big first step".

On August 3, 2017, at 2 p.m. a press conference was held at the Wayne State University Police Department. Prosecutor Kym Worthy announced her office had charged Raymond Durham with first degree premeditated murder, murder of a peace officer, possession of a firearm by a felon and two counts of felony firearm. "It's taken eight months of hard, diligent work to bring these charges," Worthy said.

Wayne State Police Chief Anthony Holt and Detroit Police Chief James Craig were on hand for the announcement. "This will bring a sense of closure to the family, our officers and the Wayne State University community at large," Holt said. "This is a solemn time, not one of celebration, as our department is still recovering, but it does provide some comfort." Craig reminded the public that officers are still recovering from the March shooting and said "I am hopeful the (murder) charge will send a strong message to anyone who would harm our officers."

At 3:20 p.m. Raymond Durham appeared before 36th District Court Judge Kenneth King for a competency hearing for the March shooting of Detroit Police Officers James Kisselburg and Ben Atkinson. A review was heard and Durham remains incompetent to stand trial. The matter was scheduled for a review on November 3. Immediately after the hearing, Durham was arraigned on the murder charges. Randy and Karen Rose were present along with Detroit Police Homicide Sgt. Lance Sullivan, Wayne State University Police Captain Patrick Saunders and Officers Chris Powell and Patrick Cecile. Durham was ordered back to the Center for Forensic Psychiatry, a 210-bed psychiatric facility that provides diagnostic services to the criminal justice system and psychiatric treatment for criminal defendants adjudicated incompetent to stand trial or acquitted by not guilty by reason of insanity.

== Reactions and legacy ==
Michigan Governor Rick Snyder released a statement while Rose was still in critical condition which in part said, "Our police officers need our support and appreciation. This recent wave of violence against those sworn to protect and serve must end. Let's hope Officer Rose can make a full recovery and let's never forget the sacrifice he has made in service to his state." He also ordered for all United States and Michigan flags to be lowered to half-staff on all State of Michigan government buildings on December 2, 2016.

Wayne State University Police Chief Anthony Holt said Rose was "one of the best canine handlers not only in the state, but probably in the country."

Wayne State University President M. Roy Wilson said "This is a tragedy felt by all of us." He added that Collin served Wayne State with distinction, and we owe those he left behind our deepest sympathies and our strong support."

Ferris State University President David Eisler said in a statement, "Officer Rose was an excellent student, a leader among his peers and a consummate professional dedicated to protecting and serving."

More than 200 people attended a candlelight vigil held for Rose in Scripps Park, a Detroit park near where the shooting occurred, on Saturday, November 26, 2016.

A viewing and memorial for Rose was held at Ford Field on November 29, 2016. Hundreds of police officers, family, friends, and community members lined up in the stadium's atrium to view his casket.

Mourners gathered for a candlelight vigil on Wayne State University's campus on November 29 and bowed their head in a moment of silence at 6:31 p.m., exactly one week after Rose radioed in his request for backup. During the event, Chief Holt posthumously promoted Rose to Sergeant, and awarded him the Citation of Valor — the highest award issued by the department. Only three other officers have received the award since the department was created. Wayne State University President Wilson also announced the creation of a US$25,000 scholarship in Rose's name.

Wayne State University posthumously awarded Rose his master's degree in dispute resolution during commencement ceremonies.

The village of Richland, Michigan placed a memorial marker beneath a newly planted tree on December 8, 2016.

The Detroit Tigers held a winter caravan ceremony at Wayne State University Police Department on January 20, 2017, honoring Rose and cobringing attention to the request for information in the investigation of the shooting.

On July 17, 2017, the Officer Collin Rose Memorial Foundation was incorporated by some of Rose's friends. The organization was created to ensure the fallen hero is never forgotten. Accordingly, they sought to further Officer Rose's legacy by providing assistance in the following areas: Support of the Wayne State University Police Department canine and honor guard teams, Support of participants in the annual Police Unity Tour memorial bicycle ride, Support of the First Responders: Sergeant Collin J. Rose Memorial Scholarship at Gull Lake Community Schools Foundation, Support of nonprofit canine safety organizations, animal welfare organizations and the Collin Rose Enrichment Center at Detroit Dog Rescue Emotional and financial support of fellow Line of Duty Death survivors.

On June 12, 2018, the Michigan State passed SB 209, which would designate a portion of Michigan 10 in Wayne County as "Sergeant Collin Rose Memorial Highway." The bill was referred to the Michigan House Committee on Transportation and Infrastructure

== See also ==
- List of homicides in Michigan
- List of American police officers killed in the line of duty
- 2016 shootings of Des Moines police officers
- Shooting of Benjamin Marconi
