= Murders of Jourdan Bobbish and Jacob Kudla =

American double murder

- Location: Detroit, Michigan, United States
- Date: July 22, 2012
- Attack type: Murder, torture
- Weapon: Guns
- Deaths: 2
- Perpetrators: Frederick Young; Felando Hunter
- No. of participants: 2

Jourdan Bobbish and Jacob Kudla were two white American teenagers tortured and murdered in Detroit by two black males, Frederick Young and Felando Hunter, who were sentenced to life in prison without parole in 2015.

== Victims ==
Jacob Kudla, 18, was a student at Schoolcraft College. Jourdan Bobbish, 17, was a high school senior.

== Aftermath ==
When Kudla and Bobbish were reported missing, an area-wide search was mounted. Their bodies were discovered in a vacant parking lot by a waste picker. They were later found to have been unusually brutally murdered.

Details of the murders emerged during the trial. A witness said that she heard the victims begging for their lives, and that the suspects told them they could leave but killed them anyway.

Before being sentenced Young gave a statement to the court saying "I'd like to say sorry to the family of Aiyana Jones, Michael Brown, Eric Garner and I want to apologize for them for not being able to get justice for their loved ones who were murdered in cold blood and in respect for the peaceful protest I want to say hands up, don't shoot, black lives matter." Video of his statement went viral.

Hunter had already been sentenced to life in prison without parole for the unrelated August 9, 2012, murder of John Villneff, a military veteran, during a burglary on Rutland Street in Detroit. The following day, he and another man murdered Joshua Hayes during a burglary. After Chanel McDonald distracted Hayes by performing oral sex on him, Hunter and Jerry Pringle shot Hayes in the head. Hunter was convicted of first-degree murder in this case and received another life term. Pringle and McDonald both pleaded guilty to second-degree murder. Pringle was sentenced to 42 to 82 years in prison, while McDonald was sentenced to 10 to 30 years in prison and was paroled in 2022.

== See also ==
- List of homicides in Michigan
- Crime in Detroit
