= Murder of Robert Cipriano =

American murder case

Robert Cipriano
- Born: Robert Stephen Cipriano; November 30, 1959; Michigan, United States
- Died: April 16, 2012 (aged 52); Farmington Hills, Michigan, U.S.
- Known for: Murder victim

Tucker Cipriano
- Born: April 5, 1993 (age 33); Michigan, U.S.
- Status: Incarcerated
- Conviction: First-degree murder
- Criminal charges: First degree murder
- Penalty: Life imprisonment without parole

Details
- Victims: Robert Cipriano (father)
- Date: April 16, 2012
- Country: United States
- State: Michigan
- Location: Farmington Hills
- Weapon: Baseball bat

On April 16, 2012, Robert Cipriano (November 30, 1959 – April 16, 2012) was murdered by 20-year-old Mitchell Young and 19-year-old Tucker Cipriano (born April 5, 1993) in his family home in Farmington Hills, Michigan.

Tucker and Young also attacked Tucker's mother, Rosemary, and his 17-year-old brother, Salvatore, seriously injuring them. Tucker Cipriano was sentenced to life in prison without parole on July 24, 2013.

== Background ==
During the last week of March, 2012, Tucker Cipriano and his friend Ian Zinderman met and befriended Mitchell Young in Farmington Hills where the three all lived. Young was employed but living out of his truck. His mother required him to move out of her home due to his not having taken steps to finance enrollment in college. At the time of the murder, he was applying to the MIAT College of Technology, according to Young's allocution statement.

In early April, Cipriano was concerned about being arrested for violating his probation. Cipriano and Young formed the plan to break into a home and rob and kill the occupants. They sought $3,000, of which Cipriano would pay the others their share and then escape to Mexico. Zinderman, however, refused any involvement in murder. Yet on April 15, the day prior to the killing, they were not initially considering that plan. On the evening of April 15, the three sought to buy K2 synthetic marijuana, and chose to break into the Cipriano household as Cipriano knew there were debit cards in the car in the garage.

With that objective, Young drove the men to the house, and waited in his truck nearby while Zinderman boosted Cipriano as he entered the garage side window. In the car he found a Dearborn Federal Credit Union card. The group took the DFCU card to a Valero station in Farmington Hills and tried without success to withdraw $100 from the ATM. They then used the card successfully to buy a bag of K2 Spice, and Young used the card to fill his gas tank. Subsequently, the three drove nine miles north to a Mobil Station in Keego Harbor near the residence of Cipriano's girlfriend. At this Mobil, the group tried the Dearborn card again and it did not work. When this occurred, the burglars reflected on their plan of murder and robbery. Cipriano and Young decided to attack the Cipriano household. However, some of this narrative is based on the testimony of Ian Zinderman. He did not state that the three visited a second Mobil station as revealed by surveillance. Young, whose own testimony was heavily criticized, requested without success that Zinderman be impeached as a witness testifying against Young.

During this initial time in Keego Harbor, Cipriano and Young assigned themselves to kill specific members of the Cipriano family. Cipriano was to kill his brothers, while Young was to kill Cipriano's parents; Young also volunteered to kill their eight-year-old daughter, Isabella. But as these roles were being assigned, Cipriano became upset and hesitant at the thought of having his younger sister, Isabella, killed. The group therefore opted to try searching the garage once more for money. They then drove back south to Farmington Hills and the Cipriano house. Once again, Zinderman aided Cipriano in climbing into the garage where he found a gift debit card. On the card was a sticker appearing to read $265. Satisfied with this despite their larger aim, the group drove back north to Keego Harbor in Young's truck. But there they discovered the card held only $2.65. They tried the DFCU card a final time, and the bank informed the cashier the card was blocked for suspicious purchases. At that time, Cipriano and Young, on returning to the truck, made the decision to carry out their murder plan against the Cipriano family, having tired of wavering.

Zinderman, however, at that point declined any further participation as he was unwilling to be involved with murder. Due to his abandoning the crime, during the investigation Zinderman was granted immunity for testifying against the other two. Around 1:45 AM on April 16, Cipriano and Young dropped Zinderman off at Cipriano's girlfriend's house in Keego Harbor. Cipriano and Young returned south to Farmington Hills and broke into the Ciprianos' house a third and final time, shortly after 2:30 a.m. on April 16. They brought knives, intending to stab the Cipriano family as they slept.

== Attacks ==
Shortly after 2:30 a.m. on April 16, 2012, Young boosted Cipriano into the Ciprianos' garage, where Cipriano picked up an Easton baseball bat and then opened a door to let Young in. But the family dog, Emmy, hindered them as they made their way through the garage. Emmy barked and woke up the family. Robert Cipriano confronted the intruders in the kitchen, and demanded that they leave, at which point, Cipriano started beating Robert with the Easton bat. Young allegedly objected, "What are you doing?" and Cipriano replied, "Join this, or you will join them." He then gave the bat to Young, directing him to kill Robert while Tucker restrained Robert on the floor. During the investigation, it was concluded that Young had inflicted the blows that killed Robert, as the impact spatter of blood on Young's lower trousers indicated that he had been standing directly over Robert as he was beaten to death. Robert Cipriano's wife Rosemary witnessed this attack, during which their youngest child, Isabella, came down the stairs with a Quest bat to give to Rosemary to defend Robert. Young, instead, took the Quest bat and struck Rosemary with it. During the attacks, Cipriano's brother Tanner called 911 while hiding upstairs; yet by the time the police had arrived, Rosemary Cipriano and her son Salvatore had been nearly fatally beaten with the Quest bat. The victims were all members of Tucker's adoptive family: his father, Robert Cipriano; his mother, Rosemary "Rose" Cipriano, and his 17-year-old brother, Salvatore "Sal" Cipriano. Robert died from the attacks, while Rose and Sal were permanently injured. Sal was left mute and permanently brain damaged.

Both Tucker and Young were under the influence of the synthetic drug known as K2 during the attack, a fact that would become a major fixation of the subsequent murder trial.

The audio recording from Tanner Cipriano's several 9-1-1 calls also played a major role in the perpetrators' trials.

== Aftermath ==
=== Trial ===
Tucker Cipriano pled nolo contendere (no contest) to first-degree felony murder and was sentenced to life in prison without the possibility of parole. Mitchell Young pled not guilty to five charges, first-degree premeditated murder, first degree felony murder, two counts of assault with intent to murder (Rosemary and Salvatore Cipriano), and armed robbery. Young was convicted on all five counts and was sentenced to life in prison without the possibility of parole.

=== Appeal ===
On October 28, 2015, Mitchell Young's appeal was denied, and all convictions were upheld by the Michigan Supreme Court.

== Perpetrators ==
=== Tucker Cipriano ===
Tucker Robert Cipriano (born April 5, 1993) was adopted by Robert and Rosemary Cipriano.

=== Mitchell Young ===
Mitchell Jordan Young (born January 16, 1992) was Tucker Cipriano's friend who was found guilty of all charges. In 2014 his conviction and sentence of life in prison without parole were upheld on all counts.

== See also ==
- List of homicides in Michigan
- Criticism of adoption
