= Martin Luther King Jr. Senior High School =

Location
- 3200 East Lafayette Boulevard; Detroit, Michigan; 42°20′38″N 83°00′57″W

Information
- School type: Public magnet high school
- School district: Detroit Public Schools Community District
- Principal: Damian Perry
- Staff: 39.40 (FTE)
- Grades: 9-12
- Enrollment: 808 (2023-2024)
- Student to teacher ratio: 20.51
- Language: English
- Area: Urban
- Colors: Gold and black
- Mascot: Crusaders
- Website: https://king.detroitk12.org/

Martin Luther King Jr. Senior High School is a public magnet high school located at 3200 East Lafayette Boulevard in Detroit, Michigan; the building is operated by the Detroit Board of Education. It opened in 1901 as Eastern High School and moved to its current location in 1967.

The school's district currently encompasses Downtown and Midtown Detroit; it also includes Lafayette Park, the Martin Luther King Apartments and Riverfront Condominiums. The Brewster-Douglass Housing Projects were zoned to MLK prior to their demolition. In addition it includes the three Wayne State University housing complexes that permit families with children (Chatsworth Tower, DeRoy, and University Tower).

== History ==
Martin Luther King Jr. Senior High School was originally named Eastern High School. The first school building for Eastern opened in 1901 at the intersection of Mack Avenue and East Grand Boulevard.

In the fall of 1967 Eastern moved to a new building on East Lafayette and Mount Elliott, and one year later was renamed Martin Luther King Jr. Senior High School, after the civil rights leader's assassination in April 1968. The mascot name was changed at the same time from the Indians to the Crusaders. The original Eastern High building was demolished in 1982.

In 2009, Detroit Public Schools became the beneficiary of a $500.5 million, voter-approved federal bond package. At almost $53 million, the MLK project was one of the largest components of the package. The redeveloped Martin Luther King Jr. Senior High School re-opened in September 2011, with almost 200,000 square feet of new space, and 47,000 square feet of altered and redeveloped space. The project turned the facility into a school that emphasized a science, technology, engineering and mathematics (STEM) curriculum.

In 2012 Kettering High School closed, and some students were rezoned to King.

== Extracurricular activities ==
=== Athletics ===
In 34 seasons (1984 to 2017), under Coach William Winfield Jr., the Crusaders women's basketball program compiled 693 wins, appeared in eleven Michigan High School Athletic Association championship finals (1985, 1986, 1990, 1991, 1993, 1994, 2000, 2003, 2004, 2005, 2006, and 2016), winning the championship in 1985, 1990, 1991, 2003 and 2006. Coach Winfield retired in 2018 due to illness, and died age 78 on March 13, 2021.

In 2007, under Coach Jim Reynolds, the Crusaders football team became the first team from the Detroit Public Secondary Schools Athletic League to win a MHSAA Football Championship. From 1989 to 2019, the King Crusaders appeared in seven Michigan High School Athletic Association championship games in four different divisions: 1989(A), 1990(AA), 2007(2), 2015(2), 2016(2), 2018(3), and 2019(2), winning the championship in 2007, 2015, 2016, and 2018.

In 2006, King won the Detroit City League championship trophy in men's swimming and diving.

In 2008, the King High School marching band raised over $400,000 (including a sponsorship from then U.S. Senator Hillary Clinton) to perform at the Summer Olympic Games in Beijing.

== Notable alumni ==
- Markita Aldridge (1991); former WNBA basketball player
- Joe Altobelli (1950) All-City multi-sport athlete for the Eastern Indians; former Major League Baseball player and manager; managed the 1983 World Series champion Baltimore Orioles
- Richard Davis (techno artist) (1968) founding member of Cybotron
- John "Frenchy" Fuqua (1965) professional football running back who played eight seasons in the NFL. Fuqua become part of NFL lore as the intended receiver for quarterback Terry Bradshaw's pass that sports historians refer to as the Immaculate Reception.
- Joe Girard (1947), salesman; author
- Reggie Harding (1961) first-team Parade Magazine All-American in 1961; led the Eastern Indians to three consecutive Detroit Public School League basketball championships; three-time All-State selection, drafted into the National Basketball Association out of high school by the Detroit Pistons; former basketball player for the Pistons & Chicago Bulls
- Erma Henderson, first African American woman elected to the Detroit City Council
- Ron LeFlore (born 1948 - did not graduate), former Major League Baseball player for Detroit Tigers, two-time stolen-base champion in 1978 and 1980
- Avonte Maddox (2014) cornerback for NFL's Detroit Lions
- Dante Moore (2023), college football quarterback
- Jamar Pinkney Jr. (born 2004 - did not graduate), murder victim
- Lou Scott (1963) Olympian in the 1968 Summer Olympics & silver-medalist in the 1967 Pan American Games, one of America's top distance runners in 1960s. 1962 & 1963 Michigan State Champion in the mile, 1962 Michigan State Cross Country Champion for Eastern.
- Emanuel Steward (1962) boxing trainer who trained world champions Thomas Hearns, Hilmer Kenty, Lennox Lewis and others; 1996 International Boxing Hall of Fame inductee.
- Helen Thomas (1937) journalist; author
- Bill Yearby (1962) 1962 Michigan state champion in the shot put for Eastern; and All-American defensive lineman for the Michigan Wolverines; New York Jets first-round pick in the 1966 AFL draft.
- George Gervin (1970) former professional basketball player and member of Basketball Hall of Fame; in 1997, was voted one of NBA's 50 Greatest Players
- Mike Taylor (1976) former NFL linebacker
- Rod Hill (1977) former professional football player in the NFL and CFL
- Ken Woodard (1978) former NFL linebacker
- Derrick Gervin (1981) former NBA basketball player, 1995 Israeli Basketball Premier League MVP
- Roy Banks (1983) former professional football running back who played two seasons in the NFL.
- Kerwin Moore (1989) former MLB player
- Gerald McBurrows (1992) former NFL safety
- Karon Riley (1996) former NFL linebacker
- Anthony Adams (1998) former NFL defensive tackle and actor
- Ron Johnson (1998) former NFL wide receiver for two seasons with the Baltimore Ravens
- Kelly Williams (2000) basketball player who plays professionally in the Philippines
- Kevin Vickerson (2001) former NFL defensive tackle
- Chris Greenwood (2007) former NFL cornerback
- Nick Perry (2008) former linebacker for NFL's Green Bay Packers
- Dequan Finn (2019) college football quarterback for the Baylor Bears
- Sauce Gardner (2019) American football player
- Jaylen Reed (2021), college football safety
- Coleman Young (1934) the first African-American & longest-serving Mayor of Detroit who also served as a Michigan State Senator; described as the "single most influential person in Detroit's modern history."
