= Anthony Guy Walker =

American serial killer

- Born: July 11, 1957 (age 69); Adrian, Michigan, U.S.
- Convictions: First degree murder (3 counts); First degree criminal sexual conduct (2 counts); Second degree criminal sexual conduct Assault with intent to commit criminal sexual conduct
- Penalty: Life imprisonment

Details
- Victims: 6+
- Span of crimes: 1975–1986
- Country: United States
- States: Michigan, possibly elsewhere
- Date apprehended: For the final time in 1994
- Imprisoned at: Baraga Maximum Facility, Baraga, Michigan

Anthony Guy Walker (born July 11, 1957) is an American criminal and serial killer responsible for the murders of at least six people in Lenawee County, Michigan between 1975 and 1986. After being convicted for a brutal triple murder, he was convicted and sentenced to life imprisonment, without being prosecuted for his other known killings.

== Murders ==
A career criminal with a string of convictions for violent sexual offenses, Walker's first admitted murder was that of 24-year-old Arleen Salcedo in 1975. Her decomposing body was found on September 22, 1975, in a field two miles south of Blissfield. The cause of death couldn't be determined, and the case remained unsolved for a long period of time. Later that year, Anthony was arrested for kidnapping and raping a woman in his hometown of Adrian. The kidnapping charge was dropped, but he pleaded guilty to second-degree criminal sexual conduct and received a few years imprisonment. In early January 1979, he was paroled.

On January 15, while looking for a house to rob, Walker set his sights on a small house on West Maple Avenue in Adrian, where 24-year-old Puerto Rican immigrant Yolanda Torres Madison and her 11-month-old daughter Jessica were living, accompanied by 19-year-old Theresa Carey, a friend of Yolanda who was visiting the house that night. Sensing an opportunity, he broke into the home, tying up and beating up both women before finally shooting them. After stealing valuables and money from the house, he set the house on fire in order to cover his tracks, which caused the little Jessica to suffocate from smoke inhalation. Francisco 'Tito' Torres, Yolanda's brother, later went to the house and, sensing that something was off, began to pound on the front door since nobody was answering. When he noticed the smoke, he called the fire department, who managed to put out the fire. After examining the site, the bodies of the three victims were located. An autopsy determined that Madison and Carey had been killed prior to the house being set ablaze, and that the child had died as a result of it. Despite the severity of the crime and outrage from the local community, there wasn't enough evidence to convict anybody at the time, and the case went cold.

In what was believed to be a drug-related crime, Walker was paid $2,000 by an unidentified man to kill 28-year-old Floyd Beatty on March 1. The following morning, Beatty was found dead near the back door of his home in Manchester. Months later in September, Walker approached a trio of highschool students who were skipping school in Adrian. Claiming to be an off-duty police officer, he ordered them to get in his car and then drove to his house. There, he attempted to assault one of the girls, but decided against it, driving all three back to the downtown area, where he safely dropped them off. He was later arrested and convicted of assault, receiving a 10-to-15 imprisonment term, as a result of being a habitual offender. In 1986, while imprisoned at the now-closed Southern Michigan Institution near Jackson, Anthony paid another inmate to kill 40-year-old Daniel A. Staggs, a convict serving a life sentence for armed robbery. Staggs' body was later found in the prison's Cell Block 4, stabbed to death. His killer was never identified, and is now believed to be deceased.

In June 1993, Walker was released from prison, but remained free for only a short period of time. A little over a year later, in December 1994, he was arrested for sex crimes in Wayne County, convicted of two counts of first-degree criminal sexual conduct and sentenced to life imprisonment, with a concurrent 15-to-30 year term before he had a chance for parole.

== Exposure ==
In 2010, after technological advancements and the discovery of additional witnesses, cold case investigators arraigned Anthony Guy Walker on charges of committing the Madison-Carey killings. At his trial, Walker pleaded guilty to killing both women, but vehemently denied setting the fire that resulted in young Jessica's death. In a shocking turn of events, he additionally admitted to committing the Salcedo and Beatty murders, and for ordering Staggs' death. In exchange for his confessions, he was not prosecuted in either case. Anthony Walker was convicted in the triple murder and sentenced to three life imprisonment terms, expressing no remorse for his crimes. According to his attorney, Robert Jameson, Walker could be responsible for more than 30 murders across Michigan and potentially other states: Anthony himself provided him with locations, dates and descriptions of the various people he had killed, either when hired or choosing to do so of his own accord. Jameson went on to state that he was more prolific than Ted Bundy himself, and had killed seven people before entering adulthood.

== Aftermath ==
In 2015, Investigation Discovery broadcast a program dedicated to the case, titled "Rising from the Ashes". In it, explored how authorities and prosecutors managed to build up a case against Walker for the Madison-Carey murders.

== See also ==
- List of homicides in Michigan
- List of serial killers in the United States
