= Morris murders =

19th century unsolved murders

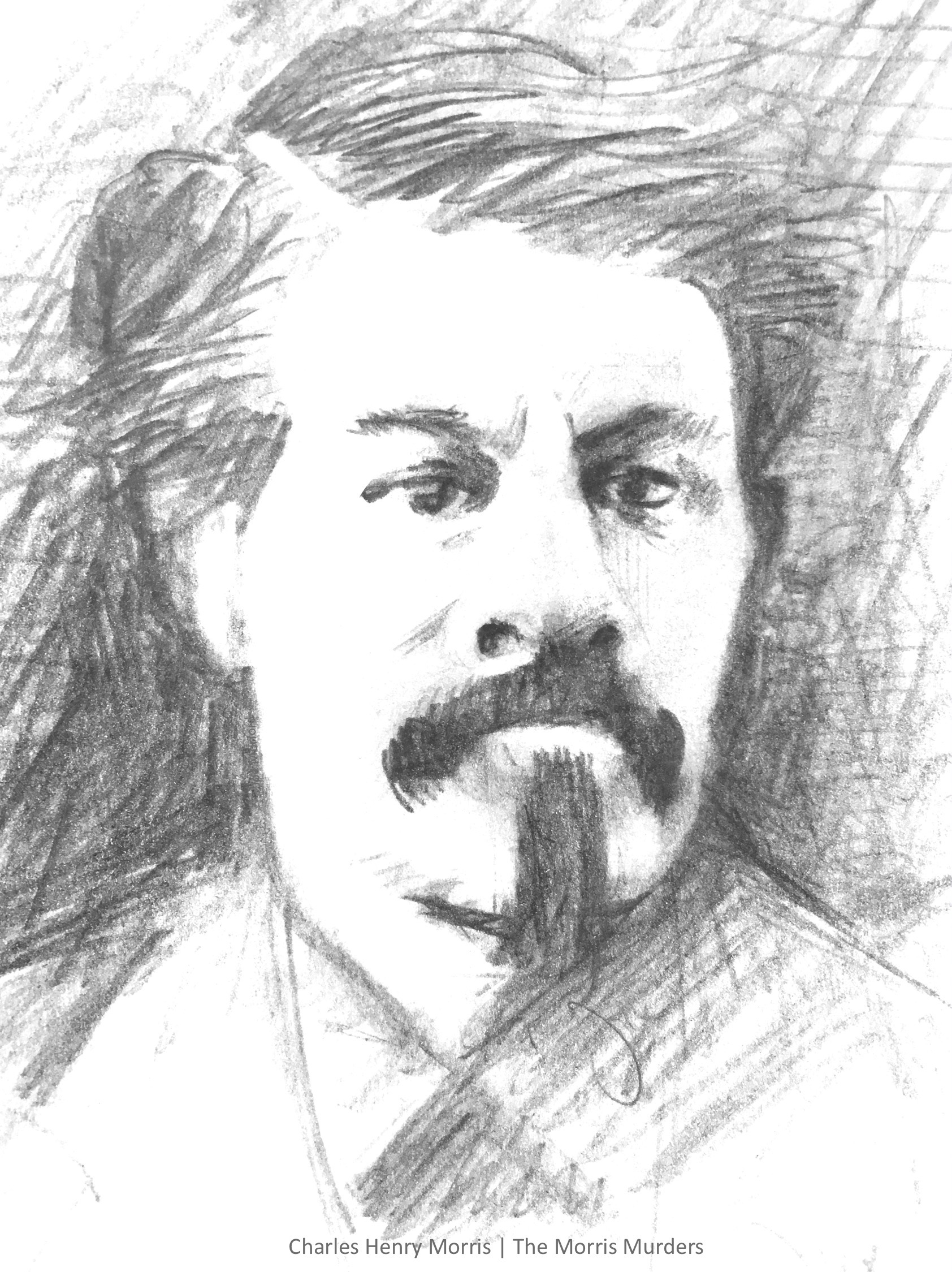
Charles Henry Morris

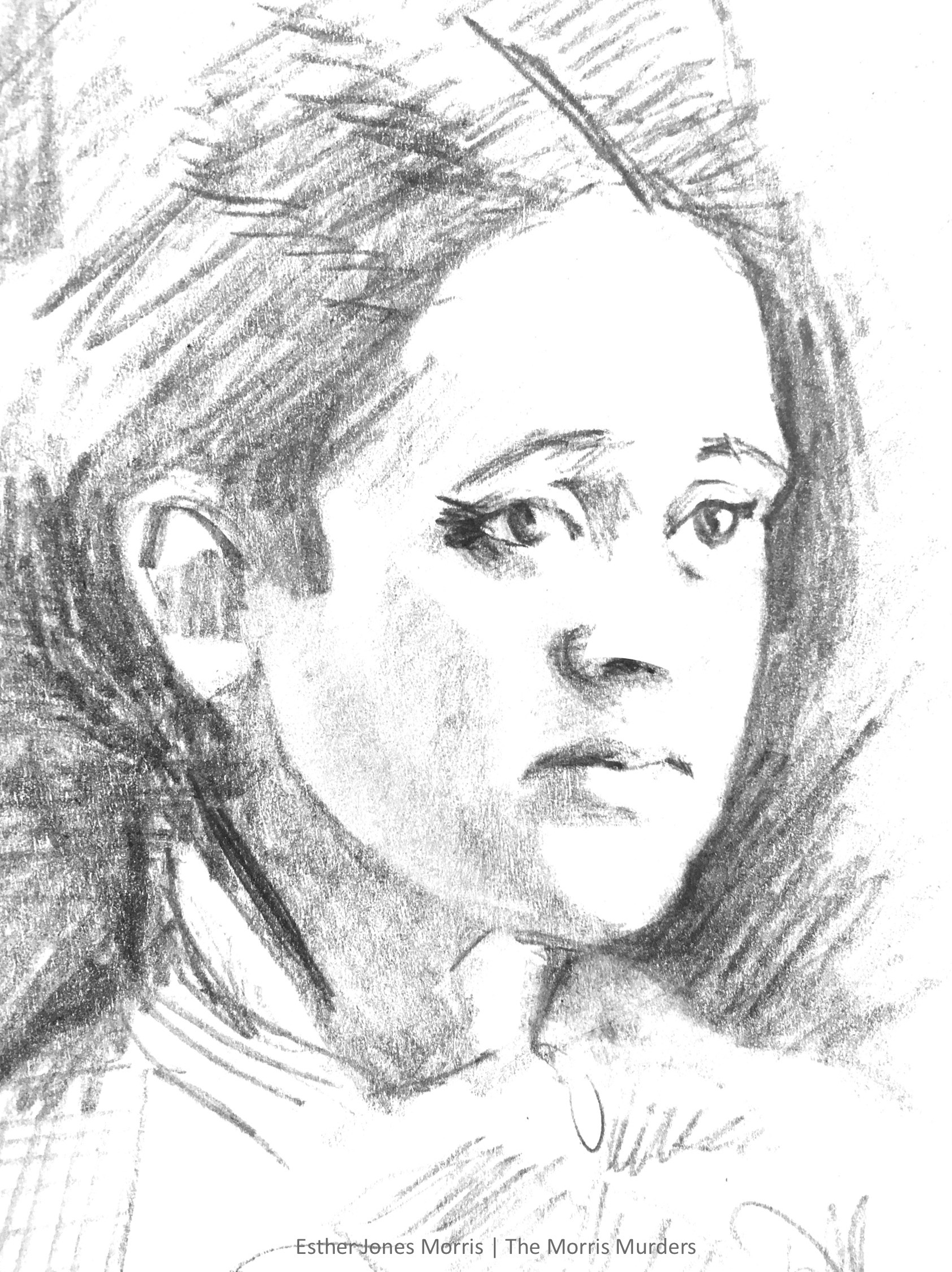
Esther Jones Morris

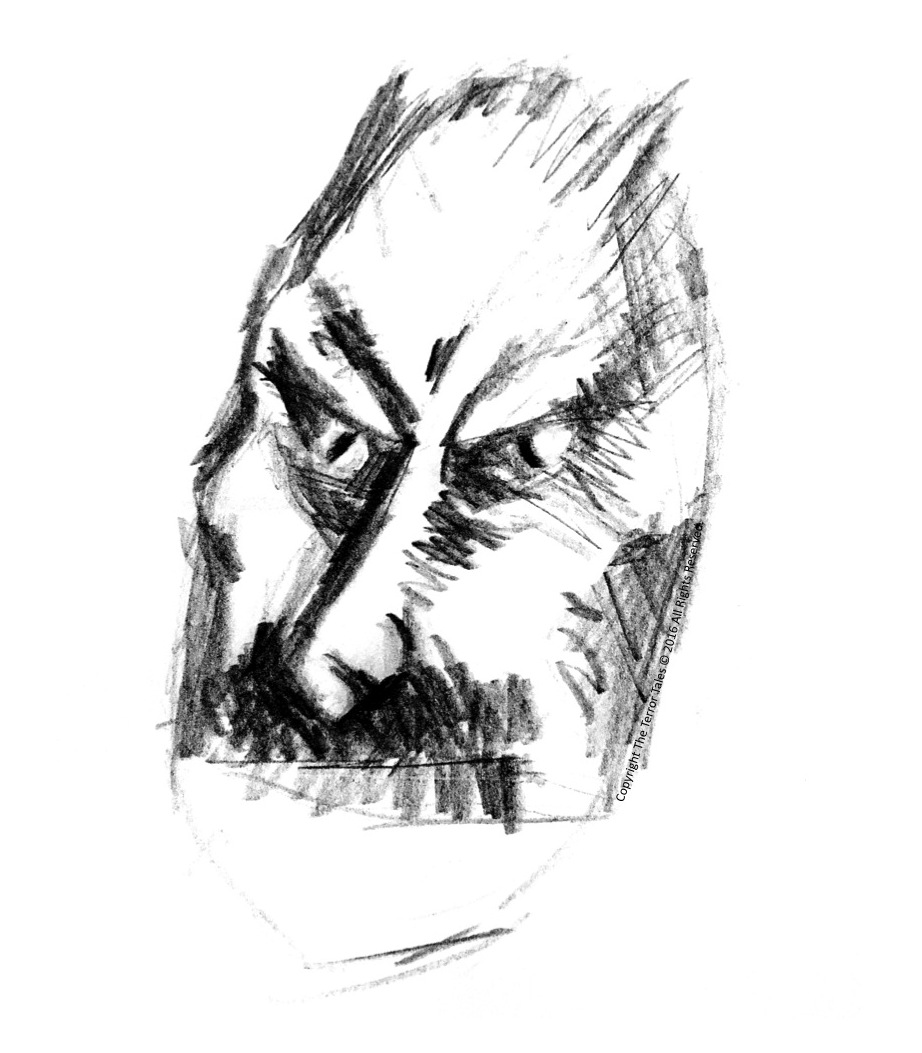
Jennie Bull Sketch

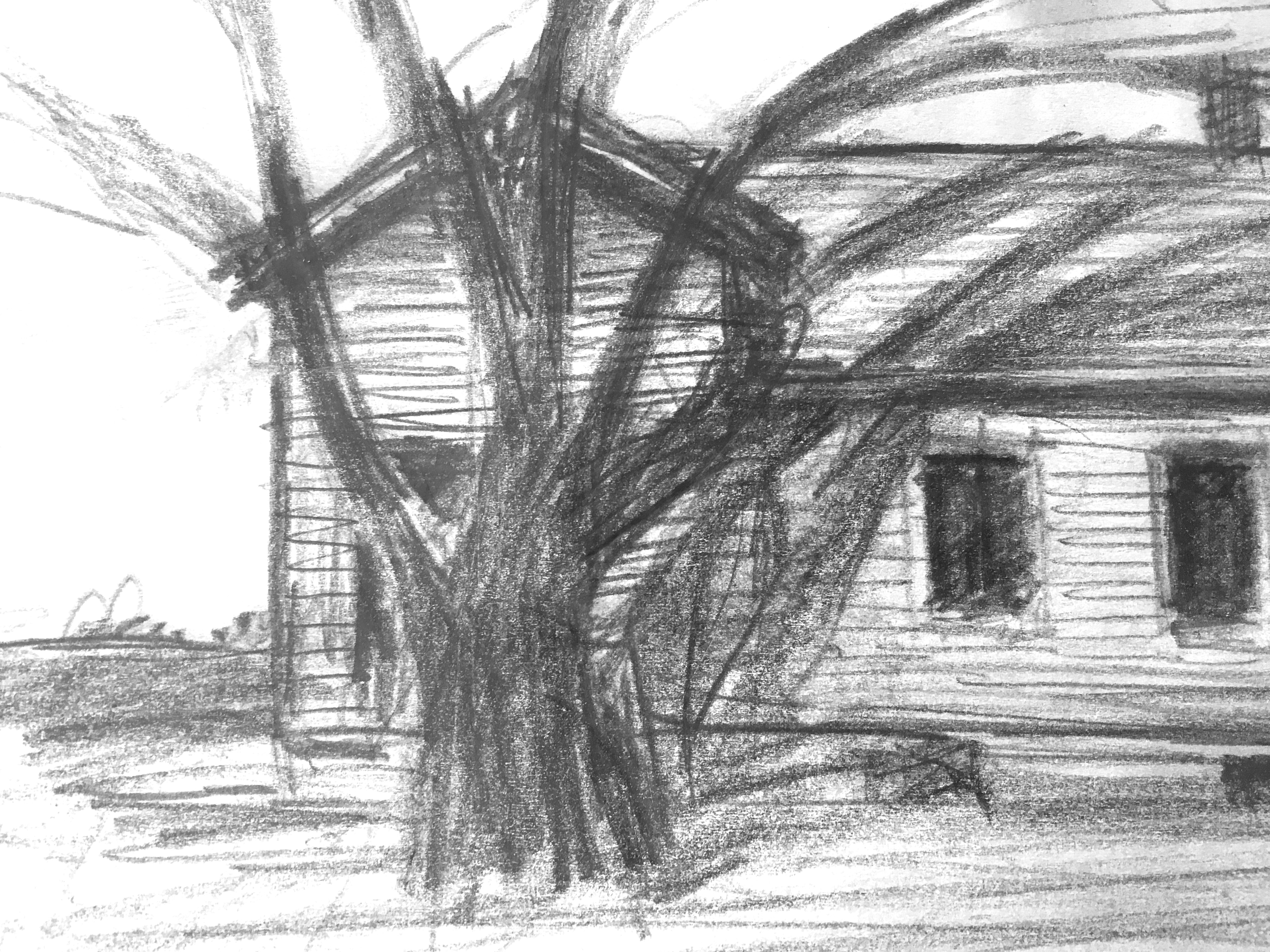
The Morris house

The Morris Murders refer to the unsolved 1879 killings of Charles Henry Morris (born May 9, 1847) and Esther Jones Morris (born September 22, 1850) in Decatur, Michigan.

== The murders ==
On the night of September 28, 1879, in a farmhouse along the road of Little Prairie Ronde in Decatur, Michigan, Mr. and Mrs. Morris retired to bed at about 8:30. The only other person in the house was their employee, Jennie Bull. Around 9 p.m., Mr. and Mrs. Morris were shot dead within minutes of each other and left where they fell. Two bullet holes from an unidentified Navy Revolver were in his neck, and one in the right breast, about an inch away from the nipple. Mrs. Morris was shot in the bedroom, then apparently ran into the closet where she was shot three more times above the left breast, below the right breast, and one shot through her arm.

Nothing was taken except for a horse that was used for the purposes of escape by the assailant. No money and gold watches lying in a bureau drawer were taken. The killer then stole and rode one of Morrises' saddled horses and was seen by neighbor Charles Rosewarne. The murderer passed him in between 9:30 and 10:00 p.m. Rosewarne remarked about the rider's "funny hat." That same horse was found in South Bend, Indiana, a few days later. The horse has a "strange fresh branding on it left rear flank." It was later revealed that Mrs. Morris was pregnant at the time of her murder. Apparently, the nearest neighbors are half a mile away from the house. Shortly after sunrise, Jennie Bull informed a farmhand employed by the Morrises (upon his arrival) that she had found both Mr. and Mrs. Morris shot to death. Charles Morris was found lying on the front porch, and Esther Morris was found lying in the bedroom.

Shortly thereafter, the Pinkerton Detective Agency was brought in but did not solve the crime. Some people were suspicious of a former hired man named Riley Huntley, who was discharged by Morris in July on account of him getting intoxicated, but he was apparently friendly. The story that made its way was that Morris must have gotten out of bed because someone was at his back porch. That is where he was shot dead. Then, Mrs. Morris, who must have seen the murderer entering the house (after hearing the gunshot), dropped the revolver she was carrying and ran to hide in the bedroom closet. That is where she was shot dead. Later, the funeral the Anderson cemetery took place on September 30, 1879, at 2:00 p.m. It was attended by about 2,000 people.

== Floyd Smith ==
A local man by the name of Floyd Smith was accused by Riley Huntley, a handyman previously discharged by the Morrises reportedly due to his drinking. After the authorities became suspicious of Huntley, Huntley accused Floyd Smith and swore out a complaint. On the night of December 17, 1879, Floyd Smith was taken into custody. He was arrested by Constable Botsford and assisted by another deputy named Scott Smith (no relation to Floyd). While blindfolded, he was taken into the woods near Decatur, strung up with rope in his neck in plan for hanging, tortured for hours, and told to confess. He did not confess. They then repeated the hanging operation four times. He was also kicked until bruised. Floyd Smith then moved away; he had serious injuries to his neck and his wife died shortly afterward from the trauma of the incident. In those years after, Floyd said that he knew nothing of the Morris murder. On his deathbed, he stated the same.

== See also ==
- List of homicides in Michigan
