= Murder of Jim Pouillon =

2009 murder in Michigan, United States

The murder of Jim Pouillon occurred on September 11, 2009. Activist Jim Pouillon and businessman Michael Fuoss were each shot by the same killer, at separate locations. Pouillon was killed while protesting against abortion in front of Owosso High School in Owosso, Michigan, evidently the first time someone had been murdered while doing so. Police arrested Harlan James Drake and charged him with both crimes. Drake was later convicted of two counts of first-degree murder, and was subsequently sentenced to two life sentences.

== Background ==
James Harlan Drake was born on March 8, 1976, and he worked as a trucker.

Jim Pouillon was 63-years-old and a well-known Michigan activist and member of Operation Save America. An elderly man dependent on an oxygen tank to breathe, he had been protesting against abortion since 1988. On the day he was shot, Pouillon was leading a protest across the street from Owosso High School in Owosso, Michigan.

== Shooting and arrest ==
During the protest, Pouillon was shot at 7:20 a.m. EDT by a gunman in a passing vehicle. One witness recorded the vehicle's license plate number. Meanwhile, police were alerted to another murder, of businessman Michael Fuoss at a gravel business he owned. Fuoss had been shot 17 times, and while killing him, Drake told him: "You should be nicer to your employees." An hour after Pouillon's shooting, police located and arrested the owner of the vehicle, Harlan James Drake. Drake indicated he had shot both victims.

Pouillon's murder was evidently the first time an activist had ever been killed while protesting against abortion. Authorities said Fuoss was not connected to the anti-abortion movement. Police said Drake was offended by anti-abortion material that Pouillon had displayed across from the school for the previous week. A Center for Reproductive Rights spokesperson said the shooting did not seem to be tied to the abortion debate and that Drake was not an abortion-rights activist. Drake said that he killed Pouillon because Drake and Drake's mother were offended by the fact that Pouillon was displaying a bloody, gory sign near a school where children could see it.

== Trial ==
While in custody awaiting trial, Drake attempted suicide by breaking a TV and using the broken glass to cut his wrists. Before the trial, Drake said he shot Pouillon because Drake's mother and nieces were upset by Pouillon's graphic sign, which Drake felt should not be displayed near children. In 2004, Drake was involved — but not legally responsible — in a motor-vehicle accident that killed two teenagers. Drake's attorney, Robert Ashley, argued that Drake suffered from depression stemming from the crash and was therefore mentally incompetent at the time of the murders. On September 30, 2009, Drake was deemed incompetent to stand trial and was remanded into the custody of the Michigan Department of Mental Health. Drake was later declared fit to stand trial. Drake testified about how he committed the murder, and even cracked jokes during his testimony. His testimony proved to be very damaging to his case. On March 11, 2010, the jury returned a verdict of guilty on both counts of first-degree murder.

On April 22, 2010, Drake received life imprisonment and expressed remorse for the pain caused to the families. Drake himself said he should go to jail forever.

== Responses ==
Several anti-abortion groups and leaders have deemed Pouillon a martyr. Lori Lamerand, president of Planned Parenthood East Central Michigan, stated the killing was tragic and expressed concerns that people would retaliate. President Barack Obama has called the killing "deplorable" and stated that, "whichever side of a public debate you're on, violence is never the right answer." Pouillon's funeral was held at the Owosso High School football stadium.

Poullion's family gave conflicting descriptions of him. His daughter Mary Jo Pouillon said of him, "He didn't want to hurt anyone that hadn't hurt him or his family," adding, "They're talking about the babies today. That's what he'd say." She sang in a memorial service that drew anti-abortion activists from across the country. His estranged son Dr. James M. Pouillon wrote, "It will be impossible for some to believe, but my dad really didn't care about abortion. He did this to stalk, harass, terrorize, scream at, threaten, frighten, and verbally abuse women ... He was at the high school because my niece was there, and female family members were always his favorite targets."

== See also ==
- List of homicides in Michigan
- Abortion in the United States
- United States anti-abortion movement
