= Donald Murray =

Donald Murray may refer to:

- Sir Donald Murray (judge) (1923–2018), Lord Justice of Appeal of the Supreme Court of Northern Ireland
- Sir Donald Murray (diplomat), British diplomat
- Donald Murray (politician) (1862–1923), Liberal Party politician in Scotland
- Donald Murray (writer) (1924–2006), American journalist and teacher
- Donald Murray (inventor) (1865–1945), electrical engineer and inventor of the telegraphic typewriter
- Donald Gaines Murray (1914–1986), first African-American to enter the University of Maryland School of Law since 1890
- Donald Walter Gordon Murray, Canadian cardiac surgeon

== See also ==
- Don Murray (disambiguation)
- Donald Murphy (disambiguation)
