= John Eric Armstrong =

American serial killer

John Armstrong
- Born: John Eric Armstrong; November 23, 1973 (age 52); New Bern, North Carolina, U.S.
- Other names: "Opie" "Babydoll"
- Years active: 1992–1999
- Convictions: First degree murder (2 counts); Second degree murder (3 counts)
- Penalty: Life imprisonment

Details
- Victims: 5 confirmed, 18 confessed
- Country: United States
- States: Michigan, Virginia; possibly others

John Eric Armstrong (born November 23, 1973) is an American serial killer who was convicted of killing five female sex workers in Detroit, Michigan, in 2000. He confessed to an additional murder in 1991 and eleven other murders between 1992 and 1997, though these killings were never confirmed.

== Early life ==
John Eric Armstrong was born on November 23, 1973, in New Bern, North Carolina. He claimed his biological father was abusive toward him and his mother sexually abused Armstrong when he was a child. In 1978, Armstrong's younger brother, Michael, died at two months old from sudden infant death syndrome. Because of the grief caused by Michael's death, Armstrong attempted to end his life. Shortly thereafter, his father left him and his mother. Armstrong did not receive treatment for his grief until 1989, a year after he was hospitalized for locking himself in a bathroom because a girl at school was pressuring him to have sex with her.

== Murders ==
Armstrong joined the United States Navy in 1992. His rackmates have described him as "moody." He allegedly killed his first victim in 1991, although this is not confirmed.

Armstrong claimed that while serving in the Navy, he had "either killed, or tried to kill, every prostitute he'd ever had sex with". In his confession, Armstrong claimed he killed a total of eleven prostitutes elsewhere while serving in the Navy. He admitted to the murder of three women in the Seattle metropolitan area, two in Honolulu, two in Hong Kong, and one each in North Carolina and Virginia, as well as Thailand and Singapore. Investigators separately looked into potential murders committed in South Korea, Japan, and Israel. However, subsequent research by local police in Hawaii and Thailand found no cases similar to those described by Armstrong. Of the separate investigations, Armstrong could only be tentatively linked to the murder of a woman in Haifa, which was later discounted after Israeli authorities found that Armstrong was not stationed in Israel at the time of the killing. Additionally, Armstrong's description of one Seattle victim changed from "a transsexual [to] a black guy who tried to bum money off him", leading police to doubt the veracity of Armstrong's confession.

He was honorably discharged from the Navy in 1999, and enrolled at Schoolcraft College in Livonia, Michigan afterwards.

== Arrest and trial ==
On January 2, 2000, Armstrong was questioned by police in Dearborn Heights, Michigan, after he reported finding a body in a river. He claimed he felt nauseated and attempted to vomit in the river when he discovered the body of Wendy Jordan, but he was not arrested at that time.

Armstrong attempted to murder Wilhelminia Drane on April 2, 2000, after she got into his Jeep, but she sprayed him with Mace and was able to flee.

On April 7, he offered Devon Marcus $40 for sex and attempted to strangle him, but Marcus was able to flee as well. Following his escape, Marcus contacted police and identified Armstrong as his captor.

On April 10, police found three bodies in a railroad yard in southwest Detroit. All of the victims had been prostitutes who were strangled to death and left in sexually provocative positions. They were later identified as Robbin Brown, Rose Marie Felt, and Kelly Jean Hood.

On April 12, police arrested Armstrong for the murder of Wendy Jordan after DNA evidence found with the body matched Armstrong's DNA. In March 2001, Armstrong was found guilty of first-degree murder in the death of Wendy Jordan and sentenced to life imprisonment.

On June 18, 2001, he was additionally convicted of killing Kelly Jean Hood, Robbin Brown, Rose Marie Felt, and Monica Johnson. He would later explain that the reason he had left Brown, Felt, and Hood in sexually provocative positions after he killed them was "so [he] could always go back and have sex... [he] knew that they would always be there."

== In media ==
=== Television ===
- An episode of "History's Mysteries: Infamous Murders" included a brief segment on the John Eric Armstrong case.
- A September 2012 episode of the Investigation Discovery (ID) series "Very Bad Men" explored the Armstrong case.
- The second episode of the Oxygen Network's "Twisted Killers" series, airing in January 2022, focused on Armstrong and his crimes.
- Woodcut Media and Sky TV (UK) produced an episode of "World's Most Evil Killers" on the Armstrong case, released in December 2023.

=== Books ===
- Bates, B. R.; Cliff, Gerald (October 15, 2024). The 'Baby Doll' Serial Killer: The John Eric Armstrong Homicides. WildBlue Press. ISBN 1-960332-98-8.
- Bates, B. R.; Cliff, Gerald (January 3, 2022). Missing from Michigan Ave: The Case of John Eric Armstrong Homicides. Kendall Hunt Publishing Company. ISBN 978-1792483868. (prior edition of "The 'Baby Doll' Serial Killer," released in the academic community)

== See also ==
- List of homicides in Michigan
- List of serial killers in the United States
