= Ronald E. Clark =

American suspected serial killer

Ronald Elva Clark
- Born: Ronald Elva Clark
- Died: March 23, 1972; Jackson, Michigan, U.S.
- Convictions: 2 counts of manslaughter
- Penalty: 3–15 years

Details
- Victims: 2–9
- Span of crimes: 1954–1967
- Country: United States
- State: Michigan

Ronald Elva Clark (died March 23, 1972) was an American medical doctor, suspected of being a serial killer. He was convicted of two counts of manslaughter and died in prison.

== Misconduct ==
Between 1954 and 1967, Clark's medical license was revoked on four occasions: once for "gross misconduct," twice for "moral turpitude," and once without specific charges. Each time he was reinstated. During this period, there were 25 complaints to the Michigan medical board, including: three deaths from drug overdose, allegations of illegal abortion, sexual assaults on his patients, child molestation, excessive drug treatment for non-existent ailments, and practicing medicine without a license.

He was committed to hospital in 1958 by his former wife, but released after less than three months of therapy. On March 20, 1967, Hannah Bowerbank, Clark's 63-year-old secretary, collapsed and died while at work. Police thought the circumstances "curious", but they had no evidence of foul play.

Eight months later on November 3, 1967, in Farmington Township, Oakland County, Michigan his part-time secretary Grace Neil died as well. Patrolmen saw a hearse illegally parked at Clark's office that night and found a corpse inside, ready for transport. An autopsy showed traces of sodium pentothal, but police forgot their warrants when they tried to search Clark's premises on November 16. He fled while they went to get the proper paper work but was caught near Port Austin, 125 miles north of Detroit.

Clark was charged with two counts of manslaughter, but the deaths of at least nine patients were investigated for either "therapeutic misadventure, cardiac arrest, or an injection of one sort or another." None of these cases were ultimately pursued.

Clark was convicted on two manslaughter counts for the deaths of his assistants and sentenced to prison for a term of three to 15 years. On March 23, 1972, he died in a fall at the state penitentiary in Jackson, Michigan.

== See also ==
- Dr John Bodkin Adams
- Dr Harold Shipman

General:

- List of homicides in Michigan
- List of serial killers in the United States
