= Kenyel Brown =

American criminal and serial killer

- Born: Kenyel William Brown; July 3, 1979; River Rouge, Michigan, U.S.
- Died: February 28, 2020 (aged 40); Detroit, Michigan, U.S.
- Cause of death: Suicide by gunshot
- Other name: "Metro Detroit Serial Killer"
- Convictions: Multiple, none for murder
- Penalty: N/A

Details
- Victims: 6
- Span of crimes: 2019–2020
- Country: United States
- State: Michigan
- Date apprehended: Committed suicide before apprehension

Kenyel William Brown (July 3, 1979 – February 28, 2020) was an American criminal and prime suspect in a series of murders which occurred in three cities in Wayne County, Michigan, between December 7, 2019 and February 22, 2020. On February 24, his whereabouts were discovered, but during the arrest attempt, Brown shot himself in the head. He survived his injuries and was taken to a hospital, where he died four days later due to complications, without regaining consciousness. The killings caused a stir both in the city and the entire state after it was found that Brown, a dangerous recidivist, worked as a police informant.

== Biography ==
Kenyel William Brown was born on July 3, 1979, into a large family with several brothers and sisters. He spent his childhood and youth in the city of River Rouge, where he attended the local River Rouge High School. In his school years, Brown, who was physically capable and athletically gifted, became a successful basketball player. In his teens, he developed a drug addiction, which caused a drastic change in his personality. Between 1997 and 2019, Brown was arrested and imprisoned several times.

== Criminal career ==
In August 1997, Kenyel Brown was arrested on charges of attacking a person with a weapon. He was convicted and given a year of imprisonment, which he served at the Wayne County jail. He was released in 1998 but rearrested the following March for illegal carrying of weapons and resisting arrest. He pleaded guilty and was conditionally sentenced to 4 years' imprisonment.

In October 1999, Brown was arrested yet again for the illegal possession of a taser and attempting to sell it. After this arrest, he began to cooperate with investigators in a plea agreement, agreeing to plead guilty in exchange for testifying against other inmates, so that the charges against him would be dropped and he could be released.

In September 2000, Brown was arrested for drug possession and attempting to sell them, but was released yet again after he provided some information on crimes committed in the county.

In February 2001, Brown became the cause of an accident in which one person died and another was seriously injured. He tried to flee the crime scene but was arrested soon after and charged with second-degree murder, resisting arrest, intentionally inflicting moderate injury resulting in death, driving without a license, and illegal weapons possession. The murder charge was dropped, and he was sentenced to 10 years' imprisonment, but was paroled in 2010.

In June 2014, Brown was arrested in Detroit for illegal possession of weapons. During his detention, he called himself in his dead brother's name and stated that he had a mental disorder.

In March 2015, Brown was recruited by agents of the Bureau of Alcohol, Tobacco, Firearms and Explosives, working as an informant for five consecutive years. Based on the provisions of the Armed Career Criminal Act, he was sentenced to life imprisonment, but in June 2015, the Supreme Court recognized some of the law's provisions as unconstitutional, due to which Brown pleaded guilty and received 21 years' imprisonment with a trial period of two years. In February 2017, after serving 14 months in prison, he was released, but was rearrested for parole violation in May of that year and returned to prison. Thanks to intervention from the federal agency, however, he was released in July.

Over the following years, Brown repeatedly violated parole conditions, but each time avoided criminal liability due to his position as an FBI informant.

In July 2018, he was arrested for drunk driving in Lincoln Park, later testing positive during a drug test.

In January 2019, he was once again arrested for drug intoxication, after which he was ordered to see a narcologist regularly by the court. He missed four scheduled sessions, after which an arrest warrant was issued on February 22, 2019.

Brown was arrested a month later and charged with violating his parole. In May, he was prescribed compulsory treatment for drug addiction, after which he transferred to a drug treatment clinic in Madison Heights, where he spent 21 days and was released on June 12. Two weeks later, he was arrested in Hazel Park for drunk driving but was quickly released on October 29 due to intervention by a Detroit police officer serving on a federal task force.

== Murder series ==
The murders began on December 7, 2019, when Brown shot dead 31-year-old Loren Harrington in River Rouge.

On January 30, 2020, Brown visited some friends from his youth, 48-year-old Dorian Patterson and his brother Gerald, with whom he drank alcohol. After Gerald left the house and went to work, 52-year-old Kimberly Green and 44-year-old Clifton Smith came by the house. Late in the evening, a quarrel occurred between the pair and Brown, who proceeded to shoot and kill Green and Patterson, as well as non-lethally wounding Smith, who managed to leave the crime scene and report the incident to the police. Based on his testimony and that of Gerald Patterson, Kenyel Brown was put on the wanted list.

On February 18, Brown shot and killed 49-year-old Garcius Woodyard in Highland Park while trying to rob him.

Two days later, 41-year-old Amir Thaxton was shot dead inside his clothing store in Detroit, with his money, valuables, and Caravan stolen after. Thaxton was familiar with Brown. On the day of the murder, he was recorded visiting him on video surveillance, as well as his car, and on this basis, he became a suspect in his murder.

Two days later, Brown shot dead 36-year-old Eugene Jennings while trying to steal a car. According to the investigators, he was his last known victim. The manhunt for Brown was led by the United States Marshal Service Detroit Fugitive Apprehension Team and the Bureau of Alcohol, Tobacco, Firearms and Explosives Detroit Field Division.

== Death ==
On February 24, 2020, Brown was seen visiting an adult bookstore in Oak Park. He was identified by two employees who called the police. Brown was unable to escape in time, as the police soon cordoned off several blocks and began a search operation to detain him. Brown attempted to sneak away by moving through houses but was spotted by tenants, after which he was surrounded by law enforcement officers in a backyard. While trying to detain him, Brown attempted suicide by shooting himself in the head. He remained alive, but due to complications, he died four days later, on February 28.

== See also ==
- List of homicides in Michigan
- List of serial killers in the United States
