= Don Murray =

Don Murray may refer to:

- Don Murray (actor) (1929–2024), American actor
- Don Murray (clarinetist) (1904–1929), American jazz musician
- Don Murray (drummer) (1945–1996), American drummer and animator
- Don Murray (footballer) (1946–2026), Scottish footballer
- Don Murray (writer) (1923–2006), American journalist

== See also ==
- Donald Murray (disambiguation)
- Donald Murphy (disambiguation)
