= Murder of Jamar Pinkney Jr. =

2009 child murder in Detroit, US

- Victim Jamar Pinkney Jr. (left) and murderer Jamar Pinkney Sr. (right)
- Location: Detroit, Michigan, U.S.
- Date: November 16, 2009; 16 years ago
- Attack type: Child murder, execution-style murder, filicide, shooting
- Victim: Jamar Pinkney Jr.
- Perpetrator: Jamar Pinkney Sr.
- Motive: Perceived punishment for allegedly confessing to abusing half-sister
- Charges: First-degree murder; Second-degree murder (lesser-included offense); Assault with a dangerous weapon (3 counts); Possession of a firearm during a felony
- Verdict: Guilty on the lesser-included offense of second-degree murder; Guilty on all other counts; One assault count vacated on appeal
- Sentence: 37 years to 80 years in prison, plus a $6,600 fine

On November 16, 2009, 15-year-old Jamar Pinkney Jr. was murdered by his father, 37-year-old Jamar Pinkney Sr., in an execution-style shooting in Detroit, Michigan.

Pinkney Sr. said that Pinkney Jr. had admitted to sexually assaulting his 3-year old half-sister before he assaulted him, forced him to take off his clothes, marched him down the street while naked to a vacant lot, forced him to kneel and shot him in the head.

On April 15, 2010, Pinkney Sr. was found guilty of murdering and assaulting Pinkney Jr. with a deadly weapon. He was sentenced to 37 to 80 years in prison.

On November 15, 2012, the Michigan Court of Appeals denied Pinkney Sr.'s appeal and upheld his murder conviction, though they vacated one of his assault convictions.

== Murder ==
Jamar Pinkney Jr. was a 15-year-old high school sophomore at Martin Luther King High School in Detroit. He was described as "articulate" and "always smiling". He was a student who received A's, B's, and C's in his courses. Jamar Pinkney Sr. was employed as a mail carrier by the United States Postal Service.

According to court records, Pinkney Jr. first allegedly admitted to sexually assaulting his half-sister during a lengthy conversation with his mother Lazette Cherry on the night of November 15–16. She said that he seemed remorseful about his actions and requested therapy. According to Pinkney Jr., the assault occurred several months earlier. At his mother's request, Pinkney Jr. called his father at 3:00 a.m. to tell him about the sexual assault on his half-sister. The girl was sent to the Children's Hospital of Michigan following Pinkney Jr.'s statements. The results of her examinations were not released, but Pinkney Jr.'s mother stated that hospital staff "indicated her son had molested the girl".

The next morning, at about 10:00 a.m., Pinkney Sr. went to Highland Park, Michigan, where Pinkney Jr. and his mother, Lazette Cherry, lived at a duplex. According to Lazette and other relatives, Pinkney Sr. asked his son if he wanted to tell him in person, to which Pinkney Jr. knelt in front of his father, apologized, and said that he humped his half-sister. Pinkney Sr. stated in court that Pinkney Jr. admitted to rape by telling him, "Daddy, I'm sorry, can you forgive me? I got up from the couch and went into the bedroom, I pulled my shorts and my underwear off and I got on top of her." In response to the confession Pinkney Sr. began beating him. Yolanda Cherry, Lazette Cherry's sister, and another woman, LaTonya Prather, were in the upstairs portion of the duplex, while Pinkney Sr., Pinkney Jr., and Lazette were in the downstairs portion. When Pinkney Sr. started to beat Pinkney Jr., Yolanda and Prather both heard the commotion coming from downstairs and both went down to investigate, with Yolanda quickly heading down first. Because the units were in a duplex, they had to walk down, exit outside, and then enter the front door of the downstairs unit. Yolanda was first to enter the downstairs, and she saw Pinkney Sr. beating Pinkney Jr. Yolanda pushed Pinkney Sr. away from Pinkney Jr. In response to being shoved by Yolanda, Pinkney Sr. pulled a gun and pointed it first at Yolanda and then later at Lazette, while threatening to shoot the both of them. Yolanda raised her hands and started backing away from Pinkney Sr., and he then resumed his attack on Pinkney Jr., at one point stating "[Y]ou want to hump on somebody? I'm going to show you. I'm going to show you how it feel".

After Pinkney Sr. forced Yolanda and Prather to leave, Pinkney Sr. pistol-whipped Pinkney Jr. and made him strip his clothes. Pinkney Sr. then marched Pinkney Jr. down the street naked to a vacant lot, and made Pinkney Jr. kneel. Pinkney Jr. began pleading for his life and begging, "No, Daddy! No!" Pinkney Sr. then shot Pinkney Jr. in the head.

Pinkney Jr.'s funeral was held on November 23.

== Trial ==
Pinkney Sr. was initially arrested and charged with premeditated first-degree murder, three counts of assault with a dangerous weapon, and possession of a firearm during a felony, in relation to both Pinkney Jr.'s killing and his altercation with his wife and her family.

During his trial, Pinkney Sr. did not deny shooting Pinkney Jr., but said it was in the heat of the moment and therefore he was only guilty of a lesser offense of voluntary manslaughter. The court rejected Pinkney Sr.'s argumentation as he had been aware of his son's confession for several hours before the murder. Pinkney Sr. explained further that Pinkney Jr. had admitted to the sexual assault without further detail in the initial phone call and that he "lost it" upon hearing the description of the assault in person.

The jury found Pinkney Sr. guilty of second-degree murder, three counts of assault with a dangerous weapon, and possession of a firearm during a felony. The prosecution pursued a first-degree murder charge, but the jury decided on the lesser offense of second-degree murder. This was a lesser conviction than the prosecution had pursued, but a higher conviction than the voluntary manslaughter conviction for which the defense had advocated.

Pinkney Sr. was sentenced to 37 to 80 years in prison, a de facto sentence of life imprisonment with the possibility of parole after 37 years. He was also ordered to pay $6,600 for his son's funeral expenses. Sentencing guidelines for second-degree murder in Michigan only call for 19 to 31 years, but Wayne County Circuit Judge Brian Sullivan said the horrific nature of the crime demanded more severe punishment for Pinkney Sr. Sullivan commented, "He beat him, stripped him naked, paraded him down the street. The only inference which can be drawn is to humiliate him and take his life."

The sentence received mixed reception. Lazette Cherry, Pinkney Jr.'s mother, said in the sentencing portion of the trial, "I will never hear his voice again. I will never see his smile. [Pinkney Sr.] took that away from me. When he put matters in his own hands, he was the judge, the jury, and the executioner. Your honor, I ask you. He needs to spend the rest of his life in jail." Pinkney Sr. said during the sentencing phase of the trial, "I'm sad about losing my son. I am horrified by what I did. I hope one day I could be a responsible parent again, a responsible citizen." Conservative commentator Debbie Schlussel said that Pinkney Sr. "got a raw deal" and while not condoning Pinkney Jr.'s murder, she stated that "sometimes vigilante justice ends up working out for the best".

== See also ==
- List of homicides in Michigan
