= Muskegon Correctional Facility =

Prison in Michigan, United States

Muskegon Correctional Facility (MCF)
- Interactive map of Muskegon Correctional Facility (MCF)
- Location: Muskegon, Michigan; 43.205675°N 86.172637°W
- Status: Open
- Security class: Level II
- Opened: 1974
- Managed by: Michigan Department of Corrections
- Warden: James Schiebner
- Website: Official website

Muskegon Correctional Facility (MCF) is a Level II state prison for adult men operated by the Michigan Department of Corrections. The facility opened in 1974 and houses male inmates aged 18 and older. It employs approximately 300 staff.

== History ==
MCF was established in 1974 as a medium-security, Level II prison under the Michigan Department of Corrections. In 2010, the facility temporarily closed and reopened to house prisoners under contract with Pennsylvania to reduce overcrowding in that state. At its peak under this contract, the facility housed over 1,000 Pennsylvania prisoners.

Pennsylvania began withdrawing inmates in 2011 after opening additional facilities in their state, completing transfers by the end of May. Following the contract’s end, MCF closed and later reopened in October 2012.

== Facilities and programs ==
MCF includes multiple housing units, educational spaces, food service, and administrative areas. Security features include double chain-link fences with razor wire, electronic detection systems, armed patrol vehicles, and gun towers.

The facility offers Special education, GED preparation, vocational training such as welding and horticulture, and employment readiness programs. Cognitive and reentry programs include Thinking for a Change and violence prevention.

Since 2019, the Hope-Western Prison Education Program has partnered with Hope College and Western Theological Seminary to offer liberal arts coursework leading to accredited Bachelor of Arts degrees. In June 2025, the first incarcerated students graduated from this program.

== Notable Inmates ==
- Christopher Scott Thomas

== See also ==
- List of Michigan state prisons
