= Deangelo Martin =

American serial killer

- Born: Deangelo Kenneth Martin; May 30, 1985 (age 41); Detroit, Michigan, U.S
- Years active: 2018–2019
- Convictions: Second degree murder (4 counts); Kidnapping; First degree criminal sexual conduct (4 counts); Assault with intent to commit sexual penetration Assault with intent to commit murder Assault with intent to commit great bodily harm
- Penalty: 45 to 70 years imprisonment

Details
- Victims: 4–5 killed; 2 survived
- Country: United States
- State: Michigan
- Date apprehended: June 7, 2019

Deangelo Kenneth Martin (born May 30, 1985) is an American serial killer who murdered four women and raped two others in Detroit between February 2018 and June 2019. Martin was arrested on June 7, 2019, and sentenced to 45–70 years in prison on October 6, 2022.

== Biography ==
Deangelo Martin was born on May 30, 1985, in Detroit, Michigan. During his childhood, he lived in a rough area and became involved with criminal activity. His mother, Chantrienes Barker, was sentenced to life in prison for the kidnapping and murder of Antoine Caruthers in 1998. After his mother's arrest, Martin was raised by his father.

Martin attended Kettering High School, graduating in 2003. According to unconfirmed reports, after graduating from high school, he studied at Wayne State University, but never graduated. After the death of his father, Martin lived with his paternal grandparents. He had problems finding employment, and experienced financial difficulties as a result.

== Murders ==
In February 2018, Martin lured Annette Nelson, 57, to an abandoned house on Winthrop Street, where he raped and strangled her to death. Her body was discovered on February 26 by a local homeless man, who dragged her body out of the home and onto the sidewalk. The homeless man was initially charged with her murder, but later proven innocent by CCTV footage.

In March 2019, Martin met 52-year-old Nancy Harrison. After the two did drugs together, he lured her to another abandoned house, where he raped her and bludgeoned her to death. Her body was discovered on March 19, 2019.

At the end of April on the same year, Martin raped and murdered 52-year-old Travesyn Ellis after luring her to another abandoned home. Her decomposed body was found on May 24, 2019.

On May 6, 2019, Martin met a 26-year-old woman at a drug den and invited her back to his residence, where he raped her and stabbed her in the neck. However, the victim fought back, attracting the attention of Martin's grandmother, who called the police. Martin managed to escape before the police arrived and was put on a wanted list.

On June 3, 2019, Martin dragged a woman into an abandoned house and attempted to rape her. However, the victim defended herself, stabbing him multiple times. He again fled the scene and murdered 55-year-old Tamara Jones, whose body was later discovered in another abandoned building.

Martin posed all of his victims in humiliating ways. He also left used condoms containing biological fluids near each crime scene, and stole a sock from every victim.

== Arrest ==
Deangelo Martin was arrested at a Detroit bus stop on June 7, 2019. He was subsequently charged with assault and attempted murder in connection to the May 6 attack. After the second surviving victim identified him as her attacker, police took blood and saliva samples from Martin, which linked him to the four murders. Police searched over 3,000 abandoned houses in Detroit in search of more potential victims of his. He also became a suspect in several other murders, including that of Deborah Reynolds, who was last seen alive with Martin in a 7-Eleven. In December 2018, her body was later discovered in a vacant home.

In December 2019, Martin's lawyers filed a petition for a psychological examination, which found Martin to be sane and subject to criminal liability. His trial began on August 20, 2020. In September 2022, Martin accepted a plea deal, which stated that if he pleaded guilty to four counts of murder and two counts of rape, he would be sentenced to 45–70 years in prison instead of receiving a life sentence. Martin was sentenced on October 6, 2022, and is now imprisoned at Ionia Correctional Facility. Ionia Correctional Facility (ICF) He will become eligible for parole on June 5, 2064.
