= Donald Wayne Murphy =

Donald Wayne Murphy (born October 8, 1950) is an author and career parks and recreation official. He was Director of the California Department of Parks and Recreation from 1992 to 2000 and Deputy Director of the National Park Service during President George W. Bush’s administration. He currently serves as a trustee of the University of California San Diego Foundation.

== Early life ==
He was born in Alexandria, LA on October 8, 1950. His father was a Baptist minister and moved the family to Los Angeles where Murphy grew up. He attended the University of California, San Diego and graduated with a degree in Biology in 1975.

== Career ==
In 1980 Murphy left his graduate studies at UC Irvine to take a position as a field ranger with the California Department of Parks and Recreation. He was quickly promoted to park superintendent of the 25,000-acre Plumas Eureka State Park, then District Superintendent of the Chino Hills District of Southern California. The Chino Hills District was composted of California Citrus State Historic Park, Chino Hills State Park, Pio Pico State Historic Park, and Old Town Los Angeles.

In 1992, Governor Pete Wilson (R) appointed Murphy to Director of the Department of Parks and Recreation. He was the first person to be appointed to the position from the ranks. Murphy distinguished himself by keeping all state parks open to the public during the worst budget deficit in the history of California. He did so by implementing quality management principles that led to greater efficiencies producing a $10 million savings. In 2002, President George W. Bush appointed him to Deputy Director of the National Park Service. His responsibilities included managing 390 national park units covering approximately 84 million acres, more than 23,000 employees, and a total budget of over $2.3 billion.

In 2006, Murphy moved to Cincinnati, OH to serve as president and CEO of the National Underground Railroad Freedom Center.

Mr. Murphy has published numerous papers in periodicals and academic journals. He is a published poet and novelist. He has appeared on CNN, MSNBC, and C-SPAN as an expert on parks and recreation, law enforcement border issues.

== Personal life ==
Murphy is married to LaRena Murphy. He has six children and eight grandchildren. He currently lives in Cotacachi, Ecuador.

== Controversies ==
Firing of United States Park Police Chief Teresa Chambers:

On December 5, 2003 Chief Chambers was suspended by National Park Service officials three days after she had reported to Washington, D.C., reporters that her department had been forced to scale back patrols so that officers could guard national monuments. Chambers also told reporters that the U.S. Park Police had a budget shortfall of several million dollars and that she needed more officers to carry out the department's mission.

Two weeks later, Donald Wayne Murphy, deputy director of the Park Service, informed Chambers he had proposed her removal and was also considering pressing charges against her for releasing sensitive information, insubordination and breaking the chain of command. Chambers was officially terminated the following July.

But the evidence against Chambers was deemed to be weak and her actions were found to be protected under federal whistle-blower laws by the Merit Status Protection Board. The National Park Service was ordered to reinstated Chambers as Chief of the United States Park Police on January 11, 2011 and the Department of the Interior was ordered to pay Chambers back pay with interest and she was reimbursed for her legal fees.

== Awards ==
- University of California, San Diego Outstanding Alumnus of 2009
