= Donald Murphy (serial killer) =

American serial killer (born 1944)

- Born: 1944 (age 81–82); Detroit, Michigan, U.S.
- Conviction: Second degree murder (2 counts)
- Penalty: 15 to 30 years imprisonment

Details
- Victims: 2–6+
- Span of crimes: 1979–1980
- Country: United States
- State: Michigan
- Date apprehended: December 15, 1980
- Imprisoned at: Ionia Correctional Facility, Ionia, Michigan

Donald Murphy (born 1944) is an American suspected serial killer, sex offender and bank robber, convicted of murdering two women working as prostitutes in Detroit in 1980. During this time, several similar murders occurred in the city, presumably committed by two or more killers operating in the area, with Murphy himself confessing to committing at least six of them. However, he was convicted of only two with the available evidence, and sentenced to 15–30 years imprisonment for each murder.

== Early crimes ==
Murphy was born in Detroit and was later the father of six children. Murphy committed his first known crime on February 10, 1967, when he was convicted of "carnal knowledge of a female" (a legal euphemism for rape at the time) and sentenced to six months imprisonment at the Detroit House of Correction, in addition to being fined $1,000. Two years later, on July 28, 1969, he was arrested for unarmed bank robbery and sentenced to eight years of federal imprisonment, but was paroled on October 10, 1972. Only a year later, he was again arrested for attempting to burgle a business place, and given a one-to-five year term at the Michigan State Prison on February 13, 1974. He was paroled 10 months later and remanded to the custody to the U.S. Marshall's Office, completing his prison term on May 12, 1976.

== Murders ==
Between January and December 1980, a total of 18 young women, multiple of whom working as prostitutes, were killed in Detroit. The bodies had all been found between the Detroit river and the city's northwest corner. The investigating forces theorized that at least two serial killers were operating in the area, as some victims were killed in different ways and in different locations than others. Of the latter murder series, the victims connected to Donald Murphy were as follows:

- (Suspected) Jeanette Woods, 24: had multiple convictions for prostitution, and was twice admitted to the Detroit Osteopathic Hospital for injuries suffered from beatings in September 1979. On April 18, 1980, Woods left her mother's house on Hill Street at about 9 PM, saying that she was going to meet with a boyfriend. The following morning, a passerby found her body on the sidewalk on Melrose, near the I-375. She had been beaten, strangled, sexually abused and had had her throat slashed.
- (Suspected) Diane Burks, 22: a mother of two from Chicago, Burks was last seen leaving the home of her sister's boyfriend on Littlefield Avenue, heading towards her home in Montrose. On June 15, 1980, her almost nude body, save for a pair of red slacks, was discovered by a neighborhood resident walking their dog at "The Easement", a known lovers' lane. She had no ID on her, and her hands were tied behind her back. Burks' black high-heel sandals were found in the nearby bushes. One of the residents, Howard Hemphill, had gone to investigate the site that afternoon, but couldn't hear too well because of his barking dogs. Noticing nothing unusual, he went back to his backyard. In the initial investigations, officers searched for the 1973 brown-and-tan Cadillac of Diane's sister's boyfriend.
- (Suspected) Cassandra Ann Johnson, 17: on August 18, Johnson was last seen entering a store, after leaving her boyfriend's house on Tuller Street. The following day, her nude and battered body was found at a field in Cloverlawn and Chalfonte, in the northwestern part of the city, by a 14-year-old neighbor who was throwing out the trash. She had head injuries resulting from a beating.
- (Suspected) Betty Jean Rembert, 26: a former cheerleader and convicted felon from Myrtlewood, Alabama, Rembert's body was found on October 8 under some hedges on a vacant lot on E. Boston Blvd., after police responded to an anonymous call. She died from "crushing injuries" to the head and a stab wound to the neck.
- (Conviction) Cynthia Angela Warren, 23: a prostitute with a record dating back to 1977 living in the Crestwood Hotel, Warren's body was found on October 23 by a passerby, a few blocks away from the Eight Mile Road strip, where she usually worked. The man flagged down a passing police car and notified them that he had found a body. She had been bludgeoned to death. According to Murphy, he picked her up the previous day and took her to Prest, where they had sex in his yellow Chrysler New Yorker. After that, he forced Warren out of the car and into a nearby vacant parking lot, reassuring the woman that he wasn't going to harm her, before stabbing and beating her with a pickaxe handle.
- (Conviction) Cecilia Marie Knott, 23: her nude body was found in the northwest of the city, apparently stabbed and with a sweater around her neck, on November 7. Murphy claimed to have solicited her services the previous day, and while they were having sex, he started stabbing her chest and neck. He later dumped the body in Littlefield.

=== Wrongful arrest of David Payton ===
In November 1980, 23-year-old David J. Payton, a girls' basketball coach from Highland Park, was arrested for soliciting prostitution services from undercover officer Anita Hicks. Due to his previous minor offences, he was publicly named as a suspect for four of the murders (of Woods, Rembert, Burks and 24-year-old Rosemary Frazier, found nude and strangled on May 30), as well for an unrelated rape. For a brief period, he was also questioned for a series of murders in Cincinnati, Ohio, where he used to play for the Xavier University's basketball team. Initially remanded to the Wayne County Jail, Payton was investigated for the murders and the rape, much to the disbelief of his friends and family, who were convinced the police had arrested the wrong man.

During interrogations, Payton falsely confessed to the murders under pressure from investigators, who questioned him for 56 hours straight, refused to let him see his lawyer, and even took away his contact lenses. However, after Murphy confessed to nearly all of the same murders, this caused a short-lived confusion, which was later cleared via physical evidence putting Murphy at the crime scenes. In the end, Payton was acquitted of all charges, and two years later would sue the Wayne County Prosecutor's Office, as well as the Detroit and Highland Park Police Forces, in a $15 million lawsuit for slander.

== Arrest, trial and imprisonment ==
On December 13, then-24-year-old Cheryl Harris was walking home towards Oak Park, when an unfamiliar man drove up to her and offered her a ride. She declined, but was reassured when the stranger told her he was a police officer. The mood shifted quickly, as the "officer" drove past her house and down the street, causing Cheryl to attempt leaping out of the car. He held her at knifepoint and told her to undress. Harris began fighting back, biting her assailant in the chest, which caused him to use her sweater belt to choke her into unconsciousness. She was sexually assaulted and left for dead on the streets. Nude and with her hands tied to her back with pantyhose, Harris nevertheless managed to crawl towards a house and alert the homeowner, who called the police. She described her attacker and his vehicle in detail, which led to the arrest of 36-year-old Murphy, of Schaefer Avenue, a convicted sex offender and bank robber who had been on probation since April 7 on a concealed weapons charge.

After a search was conducted on his property, the pickaxe handle used in the Warren murder was located in the trunk of Murphy's car. Hair samples on that handle also matched those of Betty Rembert. Not long after, Donald admitted to killing at least ten prostitutes in the city, including three previously attributed to Payton. According to anonymous sources, all of the killings occurred while Murphy was heavily intoxicated, and had only hazy memories of the events. On the mornings after, he would awake feeling that he had done something terrible, initially in disbelief, but would later realize that he had killed them after reading or watching the news about the crimes. Despite his confessions, Murphy could only be charged with the deaths of Warren and Knott, as the others simply lacked enough evidence.

On January 7, 1982, following an hour-long talk with his mother on the phone, Murphy formally confessed to the murders of Warren and Knott as part of a plea bargain. When addressing the court, he quoted passages from the Bible and asked for forgiveness from God and the victims' family members. He was convicted of the two slayings, and received concurrent terms of 15 to 30 year for each murder. As a result, from the investigation into the prostitute murders, the Detroit Police Department's Homicide Squad transferred out two officers, Lt. Richard Ridling and Det. Jimmy Harris, and respectively replaced them with two others from the Armed Robbery Unit and the Control Center, Lt. Alfred Brooks and Lt. Robert Prince.

It is unknown whether Murphy, whose sentence has since expired, died in prison or was released.

== See also ==
- List of homicides in Michigan
- List of serial killers in the United States
