= Michigan State Asylum =

Michigan State Asylum may refer to any number of early mental institutions in the state. Michigan became a state in 1837 and five years later it was accepted that caring for the mentally afflicted was a state problem. In 1848 a joint resolution required an annual return from the adviser of the number of insane, deaf, dumb, and blind people in the state. In that same year the legislature set aside 5,000 acres (2,000 ha) of land for buildings, next year nearly double that amount, and in 1850, 16,000 acres (6,500 ha). Not until 1853 was money, $20,000, appropriated out of the general fund of the state treasury. Many hospitals/prisons have been referred to as "Michigan State Asylum". There were once 16 State-operated psychiatric facilities in Michigan. Between 1987 and 2003 Michigan closed three quarters of its 16 state psychiatric facilities. Here is a partial list.

- Traverse City State Hospital in Traverse City - Northern Michigan Asylum
- The Newberry State Hospital in Newberry - Michigan State Asylum for the Insane
- Ionia State Hospital, Ionia, Michigan, now Riverside Correctional Facility - Michigan State Asylum
- Kalamazoo Regional Psychiatric Hospital in Kalamazoo - Michigan State Asylum for the Insane
- Northville State or Northville Regional Psychiatric Hospital in Northville, Michigan - Michigan State Asylum
- Pontiac State or Eastern Michigan Asylum, later renamed the Clinton Valley Center in 1973 in Pontiac, Michigan - Michigan State Asylum
- Lapeer State Home and Training School in Lapeer, Michigan
- Ypsilanti State Hospital, Ypsilanti, Michigan

The large hospital complex in Nankin Township called Eloise was not a Michigan State Asylum. It was founded as a poor house and farm in 1839 and grew into a large hospital complex. At one time there was a T.B. Sanitarium on the grounds which was phased out in 1923. Wayne County was the only one of Michigan's 83 counties that operated a psychiatric hospital, a general hospital, and an infirmary division all at the same place.

Michigan's four remaining State-operated in-patient psychiatric facilities are:

- Caro Center, Caro, Michigan
- Kalamazoo Psychiatric Center, Kalamazoo, Michigan
- Walter Reuther Psychiatric Hospital, Westland, Michigan
