= Ionia Correctional Facility =

Prison in Ionia, Michigan, United States

- Interactive map of Ionia Correctional Facility
- Location: Ionia, Michigan; 42°58′50″N 85°06′11″W
- Status: Open
- Security class: Level II and V
- Opened: 1987
- Managed by: Michigan Department of Corrections
- Warden: Dale Bonn
- Website: Official website

The Ionia Correctional Facility (ICF), also known as "I-Max" after its maximum security housing units, is a U.S. state prison located in Ionia, Michigan.

The prison was opened in 1987 and consists of five maximum security level V housing units and two medium security level II housing units. It is one of three maximum security men's prison facilities in Michigan, along with Marquette Branch Prison in Marquette, and Baraga Correctional Facility in Baraga. (The Standish Maximum Correctional Facility in Standish was a fifth maximum security men's prison until its closure in 2009 eliminating 604 Level V security beds.) Although the Ionia Correctional Facility was once the state's only supermax prison, Michigan downgraded the facility from a level VI (or supermax) to a level V maximum security prison in 2004.

Three of the level V housing units are designated 'general population'. The remaining two are used for administrative segregation (a unit in which prisoners are confined to their cells for breaking prison rules), temporary segregation, detention, and secure outpatient treatment. The level II facility consists of a 280-bed building separated into two units. Level II prisoners have access to a variety of recreational activities and are allowed to work in the prison and for Michigan State Industries, a factory that employs low-risk prisoners.

This is where Leslie Allen Williams is serving multiple life sentences after he fully acknowledged his own lack of control in murdering four teenage girls - Kami Villanueva (18), Melissa Urbin (14), Michelle Urbin (16), and Cynthia Marie Jones (15)—in southeastern Michigan between September 1991 and January 1992. He explicitly told investigators and psychologists that if he were ever released, he would continue to hunt and kill. He explicitly used his own dangerous impulses to demand the harshest possible confinement, which influenced the legal outcome. Williams waived his right to a trial, pled guilty, and actively asked the court to "lock him up and throw away the key" because he knew he could not stop himself. His admission that he would kill again—combined with the fact that he was already on parole when he committed the murders—deeply terrified the public. It forced Michigan lawmakers to completely overhaul their parole guidelines to ensure offenders like him could never manipulate their way out of prison again.

This is where convicted murderer Carl Watts was serving his time before his death in 2007.

== See also ==
- List of Michigan state prisons
