= Murder City (disambiguation) =

Murder City is a British television crime drama series.

Murder City may also refer to:

- Murder City: Detroit - 100 Years of Crime and Violence, a 2008 documentary film
- Dika: Murder City, a 1995 documentary film
- "Murder City", a 2009 song by Green Day from 21st Century Breakdown
- Detroit, Michigan, known as "Murder City" in the 1970s; see Hazelwood massacre
- Murder City, a 2023 Tubi original film voted on the 2020 Blacklist

== See also ==
- The Murder City Devils
- The Murder City Machine Guns
