= 1967 Detroit riot =

American riot

- Part of the long, hot summer of 1967
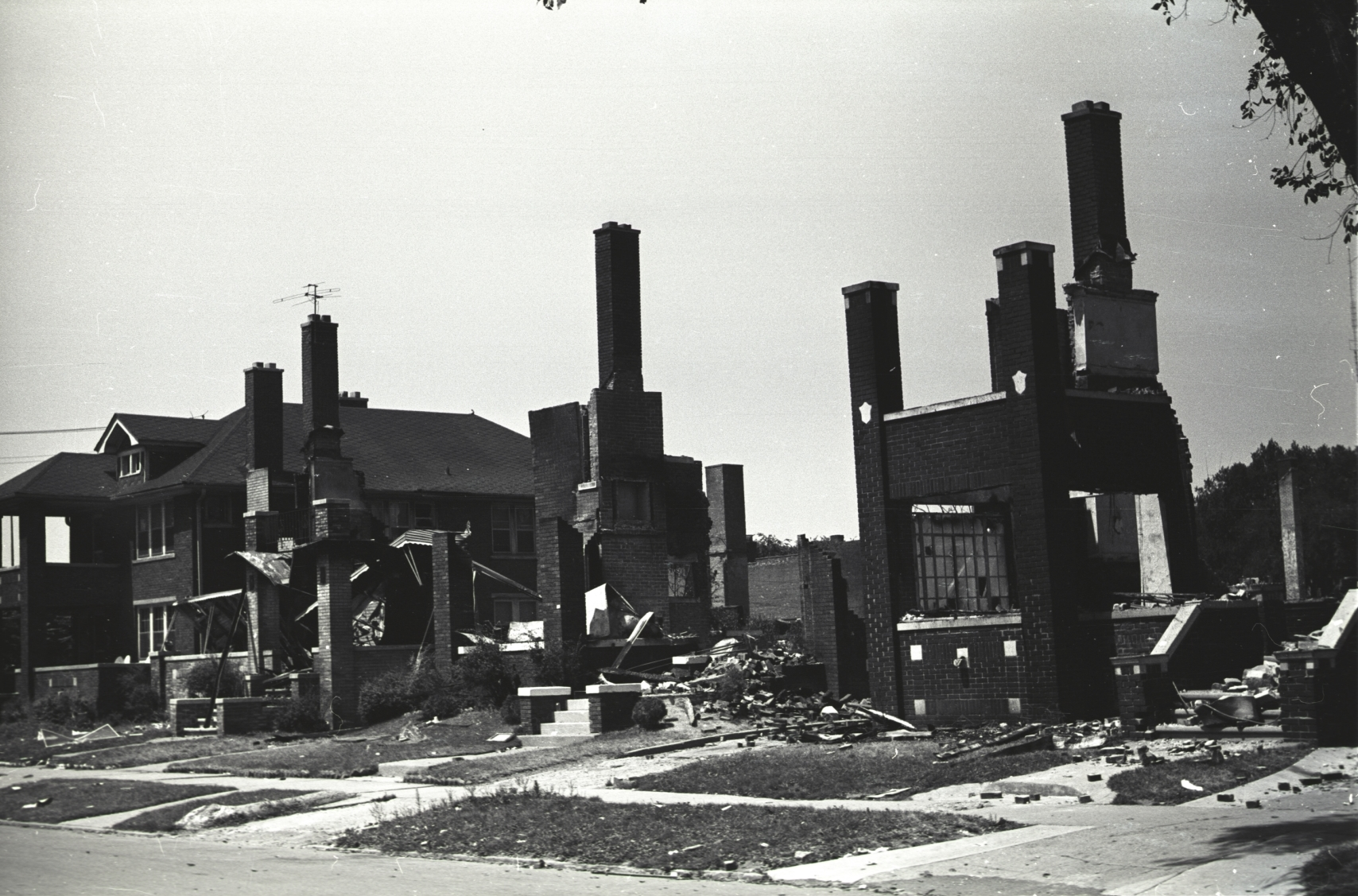
- Destroyed buildings in Detroit, July 24, 1967
- Date: July 23–28, 1967
- Location: Detroit, Michigan, U.S. 42°22′35″N 83°05′58″W
- Caused by: Police raid of an unlicensed, after-hours bar
- Methods: Rioting, protests, looting, arson, murder, assault
- Result: See Effects

Parties
United States; 82nd Airborne Division; 101st Airborne Division; State of Michigan; Michigan Army National Guard; Michigan State Police; Detroit; Detroit Police Department; (Michigan) Detroit Fire Department	Rioters, and residents of Detroit

Casualties
- Deaths: 43
- Injuries: 1,189
- Arrested: 7,231
- Damage: c.$40 million

The 1967 Detroit riot, also known as the 12th Street Riot, was the bloodiest of the urban riots in the United States during the "long, hot summer of 1967". Composed mainly of confrontations between African American residents and the Detroit Police Department, it began in the early morning hours of Sunday, July 23, 1967, in Detroit.

The precipitating event was a police raid of an unlicensed, after-hours bar, known as a blind pig, on the city's Near West Side. It exploded into one of the deadliest and most destructive social insurgences in American history, lasting five days and surpassing the scale of Detroit's 1943 race riot 24 years earlier.

Governor George W. Romney ordered the Michigan Army National Guard into Detroit to help end the disturbance. President Lyndon B. Johnson sent in the United States Army's 82nd and 101st Airborne divisions. The riot resulted in 43 deaths, 1,189 injured, over 7,200 arrests, and more than 400 buildings destroyed.

The scale of the riot was the worst in the United States since the 1863 New York City draft riots during the American Civil War, and it was not surpassed until the 1992 Los Angeles riots 25 years later.

The riot was prominently featured in the news media, with live television coverage, extensive newspaper reporting, and extensive stories in Time and Life magazines. The staff of the Detroit Free Press won the 1968 Pulitzer Prize for general local reporting for its coverage.

== Background ==
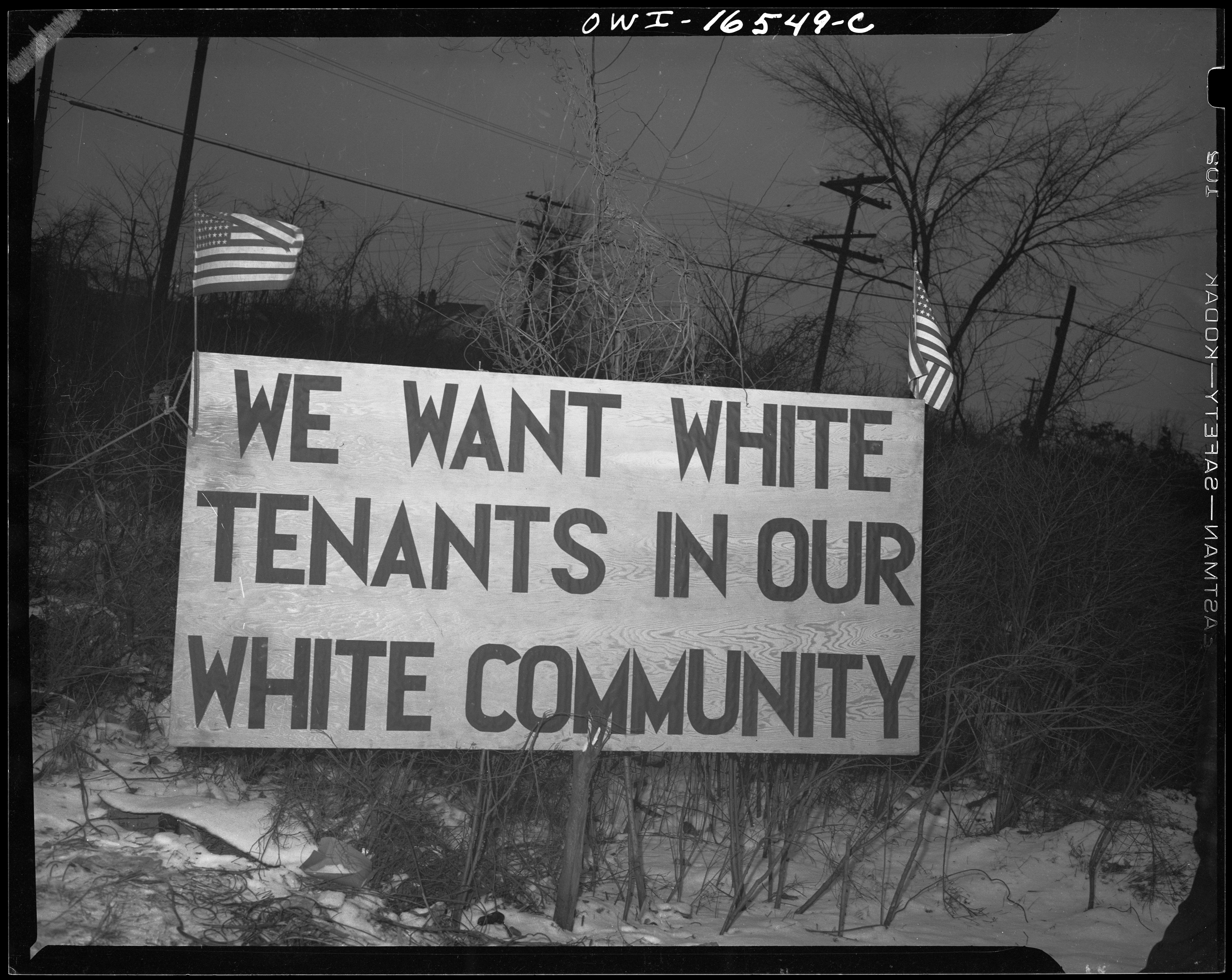
Suburban homeowners in Detroit installed this sign in 1942, reading "WE WANT WHITE TENANTS IN OUR WHITE COMMUNITY". The legacy of housing segregation continued long afterwards, and most whites resisted fair housing measures in the years before the riot. Photograph by Arthur Siegel.

=== Racial segregation ===
In the early 20th century, when African Americans migrated to Detroit in the Great Migration, the city experienced a rapidly increasing population and a shortage of housing. African Americans encountered strong discrimination in housing. Both racial covenants and unspoken agreements among whites kept black people out of certain neighborhoods and prevented most African Americans from buying their own homes. The presence of Ku Klux Klan members throughout Michigan furthered racial tensions and violence. Malcolm X's father, Earl Little, was killed in a streetcar accident in 1931, albeit X stated in his autobiography that he believed the Black Legion, a more radical breakaway of the Klan, in East Lansing was involved. In addition, a system of redlining was instituted, which made it nearly impossible for black Detroiters to purchase a home in most areas of the city, effectively locking black residents into lower-quality neighborhoods. These discriminatory practices and the effects of the segregation that resulted from them contributed significantly to the racial tensions in the city before the riot. Segregation also encouraged harsher policing in African American neighborhoods, which escalated Black Detroiters' frustrations leading up to the riot.

Patterns of racial and ethnic segregation persisted through the mid-20th century. In 1956, mayor Orville Hubbard of Dearborn, part of Metro Detroit, boasted to the Montgomery Advertiser that "Negroes can't get in here...These people are so anti-colored, much more than you in Alabama."

=== Recent reforms ===
The election of Mayor Jerome Cavanagh in 1961 brought some reform to the police department, led by new Detroit Police Commissioner George Edwards. Detroit had acquired millions in federal funds through President Johnson's Great Society programs and invested them almost exclusively in Black neighborhoods, where poverty and social problems were concentrated at the time. By the 1960s, many Black people had advanced into better union and professional jobs. The city had a prosperous Black middle class; higher-than-normal wages for unskilled Black workers due to the success of the auto industry; two black Congressmen (half of the Black Congressmen at the time); three Black judges; two black members on the Detroit Board of Education; a housing commission that was forty percent Black; and twelve Black representatives representing Detroit in the Michigan legislature. The city had historic Black neighborhoods such as Conant Gardens. In May 1967, the federal administration ranked housing for the Black community in Detroit above that of Philadelphia, New York, Chicago, and Cleveland. Nicholas Hood, the sole Black member of the nine-member Detroit Common Council, praised the Cavanagh administration for its willingness to listen to concerns of the inner city. Weeks prior to the riot, Mayor Cavanagh had said that residents did not "need to throw a brick to communicate with City Hall."

There were still signs of Black disaffection, however; In 1964, Rosa Parks, who had moved to Detroit in the late fifties, told an interviewer: "I don't feel a great deal of difference here [from Alabama]...Housing segregation is just as bad, and it seems more noticeable in the larger cities." The improvements mostly benefited wealthier black Detroiters, and low income Black Detroiters remained frustrated by the social conditions in Detroit. Despite the modest improvements described above, segregation, police brutality and racial tension were rampant in 1960s Detroit and played a large role in inciting the riot.

=== Policing issues ===
The Detroit Police Department was directly administered by the Mayor. Prior to the riot, Mayor Cavanagh's appointees, George Edwards and Ray Girardin, worked for reform. Edwards tried to recruit and promote Black police officers, but he refused to establish a civilian police review board, as African Americans had requested. During the trial to discipline police officers who were accused of resorting to brutality, he turned the police department's rank-and-file against him. Many whites believe that his policies were "too soft on crime". In 1965, the Community Relations Division of the Michigan Civil Rights Commission undertook a study of the police, published in 1968. It claimed that the "police system" was at fault for racism. The police department was accused of recruiting "bigots" and it was also accused of reinforcing bigotry through its "value system". According to the results of a survey which was conducted by President Johnson's Kerner Commission, prior to the riot, 45 percent of the police officers who were working in Black neighborhoods were "extremely anti-Negro" and an additional 34 percent were "prejudiced".

In 1967, 93% of the force was still white, although 30% of city residents were Black. Incidents of police brutality caused Black residents to feel unsafe. They resented many police officers who they felt talked down to them, addressing men as "boys" and addressing women as "honey" and "baby." Police conducted street searches on groups of young men, and single women complained about being called prostitutes for simply walking on the street. The police frequently arrested people who did not have proper identification. The local press reported several questionable shootings and beatings of Black citizens by officers in the years before 1967. After the riot, a Detroit Free Press survey showed that residents reported police brutality as the number one problem they faced in the period leading up to the riot.

Black residents complained by stating that the police did not respond to their calls as quickly as they responded to the calls which were made by white residents. They believed that the police force profited from vice and other crimes which were committed in Black neighborhoods, and the press's accusations that the police force was corrupt and linked to organized crime weakened their trust in the police force. According to Sidney Fine, "the biggest complaint about vice in the ghetto was prostitution." The Black community's leadership thought that the police did not do enough to curb white johns from exploiting Black women. In the weeks leading up to the riot, police had started to work to curb prostitution along Twelfth Street. On July 1, a prostitute was killed, and rumors spread that the police had shot her. The police said that she was murdered by local pimps. Detroit police used Big 4 or Tac squads, each made up of four police officers, to patrol Detroit neighborhoods, and such squads were used to combat soliciting.

Black residents felt that police raids on after-hours drinking clubs were racially biased actions. Since the 1920s, such clubs had become important parts of Detroit's social life for Black residents; although they were established during Prohibition, they continued to exist because Black people were not served in many Detroit bars, restaurants, and entertainment venues.

=== Employment and unemployment ===
In the postwar period, the city had lost nearly 150,000 jobs to the suburbs with white flight taking shape at the time. Contributing factors were a combination of changes in technology, increased automation, consolidation of the auto industry, taxation policies, the need for different kinds of manufacturing space, and the construction of the highway system that eased transportation. Major companies like Packard, Hudson, and Studebaker, as well as hundreds of smaller companies, went out of business. In the 1950s, the unemployment rate hovered near 10 percent. Between 1946 and 1956, GM spent $3.4 billion on new plants, Ford $2.5 billion, and Chrysler $700 million, opening a total of 25 auto plants, all in Detroit's suburbs. As a result, workers who could do so left Detroit for jobs in the suburbs. Other middle-class residents left the city for newer housing, in a pattern repeated nationwide. In the 1960s, the city lost about 10,000 residents per year to the suburbs. Detroit's population fell by 179,000 between 1950 and 1960, and by another 156,000 residents by 1970, which affected all its retail businesses and city services.

By the time of the riot, unemployment among Black men was more than double that among white men in Detroit. In the 1950s, 15.9 percent of black people were unemployed, but only 6 percent of white people were unemployed. This was partially due to the union seniority system of the factories. Except for Ford, which hired a significant number of Black workers for their factories, the other automakers did not hire Black workers until World War II resulted in a labor shortage. With lower seniority, black workers were the first to be laid off in job cutbacks after the war. Moreover, Black labor was "ghettoized" into the "most arduous, dangerous and unhealthy jobs."

When the auto industry boomed again in the early 1960s, only Chrysler and the Cadillac Division of General Motors assembled vehicles in the city of Detroit. The Black workers they hired got "the worst and most dangerous jobs: the foundry and the body shop."

A prosperous, Black educated class had developed in traditional professions such as social work, ministry, medicine, and nursing. Many other Black citizens working outside manufacturing were relegated to service industries as waiters, porters, or janitors. Many Black women were limited to work in domestic service. Certain business sectors were known to discriminate against hiring Black workers, even at entry-level positions. It took picketing by Arthur Johnson and the Detroit chapter of the NAACP before First Federal Bank hired their first black tellers and clerks.

=== Housing developments and discrimination ===
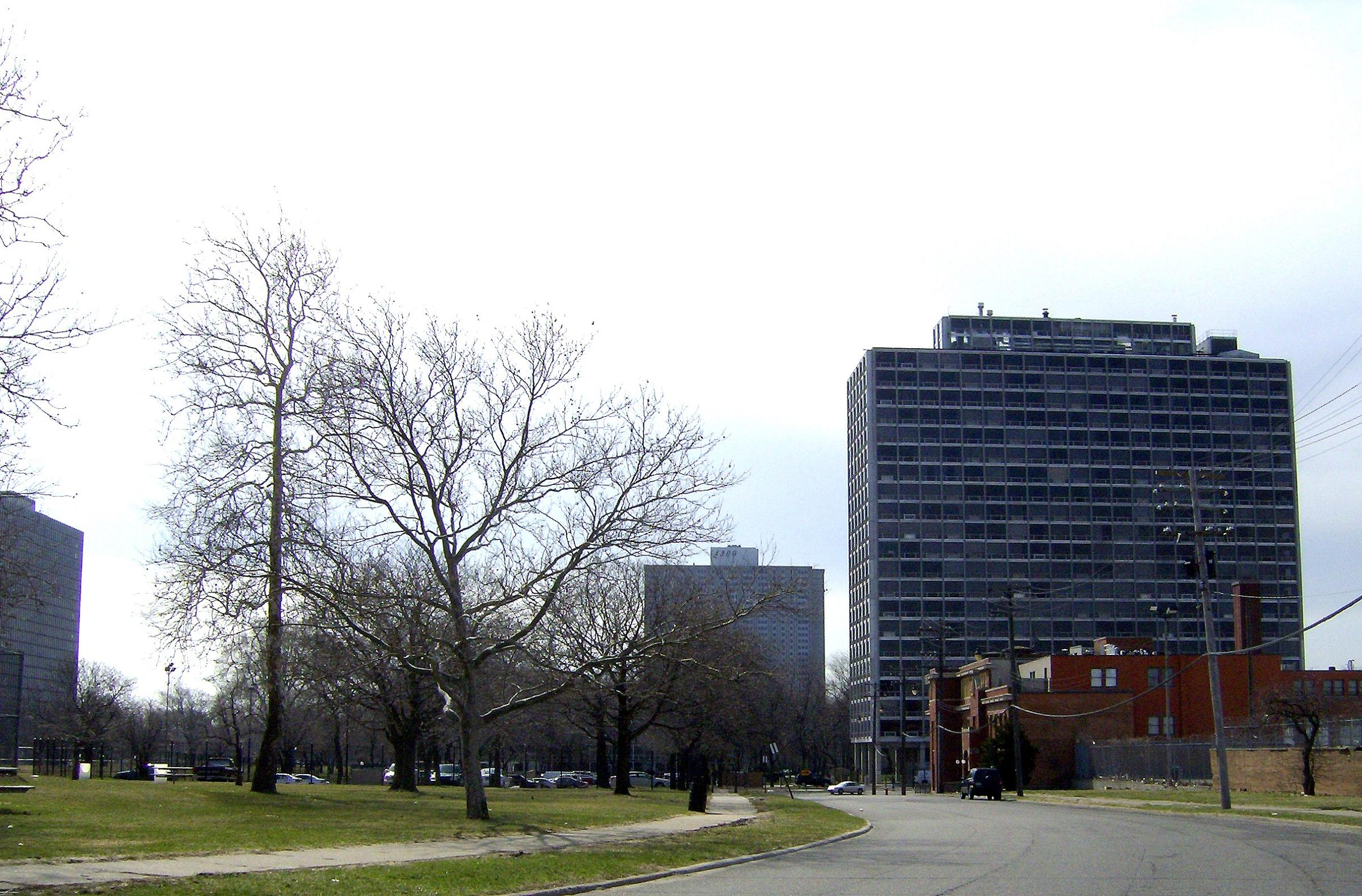
The neighborhood of Black Bottom, a center of the Black community, was replaced by Lafayette Park (pictured here) in an urban renewal project. Its loss resulted in racial tensions, due to the dislocation of community networks as well as loss of housing.

Housing in Detroit had been a major problem due to the industrial boom that started in the early 20th century. Several urban renewal projects after World War II, intended to improve housing, dramatically changed neighborhood boundaries and ethnic composition. Affordability for industrial workers and the sheer number of new people in the city resulted in a housing shortage, ultimately fostering the need to establish federal loan systems and invest in public housing, especially for minority populations. Detroit undertook a series of urban renewal projects that disproportionately affected Black people, who occupied some of the oldest housing.

Racial discrimination in housing was federally enforced by redlining and restrictive covenants in the mid-20th century. They played an important role in segregating Detroit and escalating racial tensions in the city. The Home Owners' Loan Corporation was in charge of assigning ratings of "A" (green) through "D" (red) to all of the neighborhoods in major U.S. cities based on the conditions of the buildings, the infrastructure and most importantly, the racial composition of the area. Residents of a neighborhood with a "C" or "D" rating struggled to get loans, and almost all neighborhoods with any African American population were rated "D", effectively segregating the city by race. This effectively limited options for African Americans to purchase houses outside of these areas, or acquire resources to repair their already damaged homes in these areas. In fact, only 0.8% of all new construction in the city was available to African Americans. Black Bottom and Paradise Valley (located on Detroit's lower east side, south of Gratiot) were examples of African-American neighborhoods that formed as a result of these government restrictions.

Examples of city projects for housing include the massive Gratiot Redevelopment Project, planned as early as 1946. It was planned eventually to cover a 129-acre (52 ha) site on the lower east side that included Hastings Street – the center of Paradise Valley. Other public housing projects also resulted in more tension between white and Black people in the city. Although it seemed positive for working-class individuals, the negative effects can still be felt today. Projects like Sojourner Truth were erected in 1941 to account for the unfair bias against African Americans in their housing search. However, it ended up concentrating the African Americans in areas where city whites did not want them, only furthering the racial tension in the city at the time.

The city's goals were to "arrest the exodus of business from the central city, to convert slum property to better housing, and to enlarge the city's tax base." Bolstered by successive federal legislation, including the 1941, 1949, 1950, 1954 versions of the Housing Act and its amendments through the 1960s, the city acquired funds to develop the Detroit Medical Center complex, Lafayette Park, Central Business District Project One, and the Chrysler Freeway, by appropriating land and "clearing slums". Money was included for replacement housing in the legislation, but the goal of urban renewal was to physically reshape the city; its social effects on neighborhoods was not well understood. As older neighborhoods were demolished, Black people, and people of every color from Detroit's skid row, moved to areas north of Black Bottom along Grand Boulevard, but especially to the west side of Woodward, along Grand Boulevard and ultimately the 12th Street neighborhood. As Ze'ev Chafets wrote in Devil's Night and Other True Tales of Detroit (1990s), in the 1950s the area around 12th Street rapidly changed from a community of ethnic Jews to a predominantly Black community, an example of white flight at the time. Jewish residents had moved to the suburbs for newer housing, but they often retained business or property interests in their old community. Thus, many of the blacks who moved to the 12th Street area rented from absentee landlords and shopped in businesses run by suburbanites. Crime rates rose in the 12th Street area and Detroit has recently seen its lowest homicide rates since 1965.

By 1967, distinct neighborhood boundaries were known, whether visible (as the case on Eight Mile and Wyoming), or invisible (as the case of Dequindre Road). With white and Black people culturally and physically separated, racial tensions were high in the city. As a result, African American neighborhoods were overrun, high in density, and often poor in health quality. For example, the neighborhood around 12th Street had a population density that was twice the city average. After the riot, respondents to a Detroit Free Press poll listed poor housing as the second most important issue leading up to the riot, behind police brutality.

=== Education ===
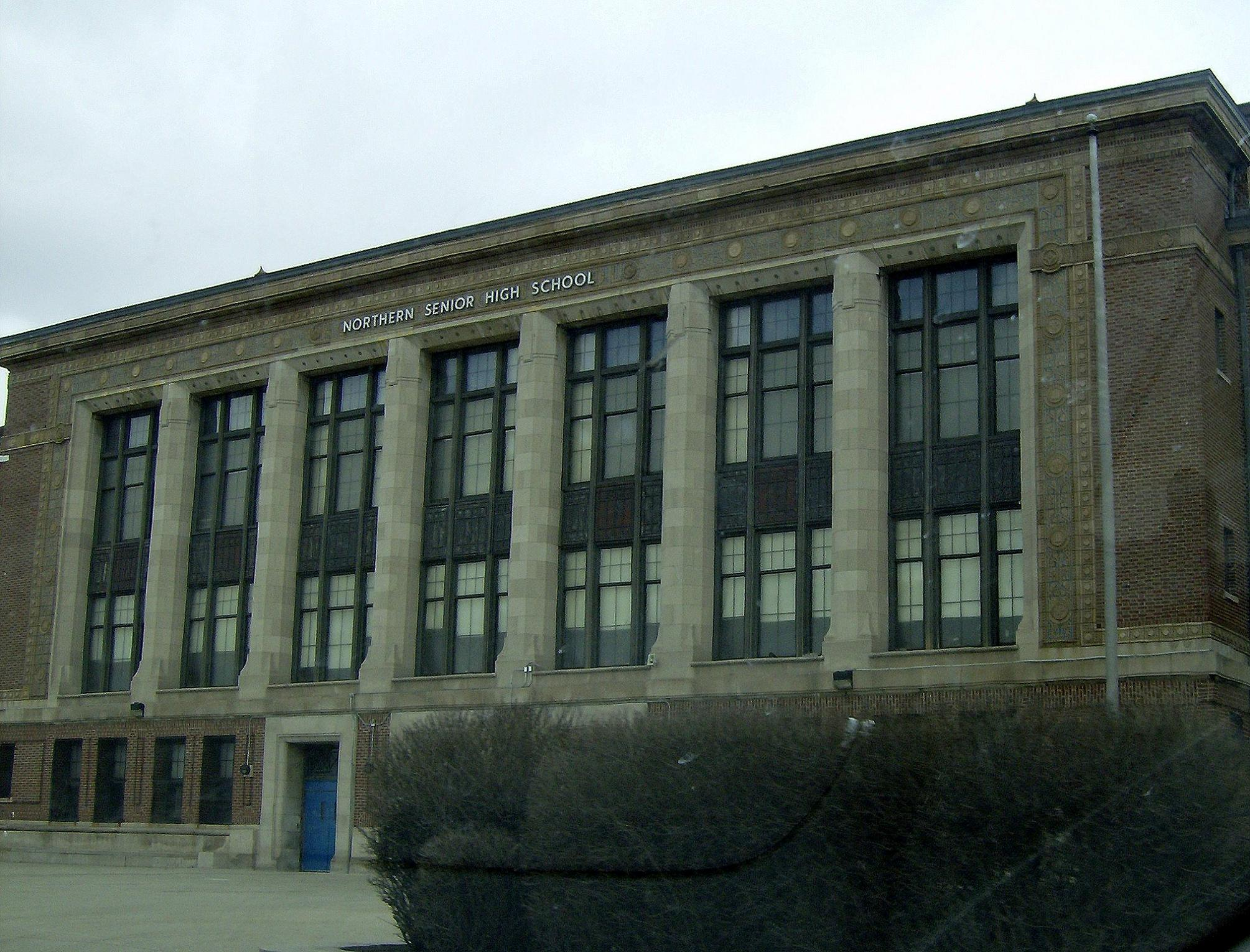
Northern High School on Woodward Avenue was 98% black in 1966 and the setting of a black-student walkout

Detroit Public Schools suffered from underfunding and racial discrimination before the riots. Underfunding was a function of a decreasing tax base as the population shrank while the numbers of students rose. From 1962 to 1966, enrollment grew from 283,811 to 294,653, but the loss of tax base made less funding available. At the same time, middle-class families were leaving the district, and the numbers of low-scoring and economically disadvantaged students, mostly Black, were increasing. In 1966–67, the funding per pupil in Detroit was $193 compared to $225 per pupil in the suburbs. Exacerbating this inequity were the challenges in educating disadvantaged students. The Detroit Board of Education estimated it cost twice as much to educate a "ghetto child properly as to educate a suburban child". According to Michigan law in 1967, class sizes could not exceed thirty-five students, but in Detroit schools at the time, they did, sometimes swelling to forty students per teacher. To have the same teacher/student ratio as the rest of the state, Detroit would have to hire 1,650 more teachers for the 1966–67 school year.

In 1959, the Detroit School Board passed a bylaw banning discrimination in all school operations and activities. From 1962 to 1966, Black organizations continued to work to improve the quality of education of black students. Issues included class size, school boundaries, and the ways in which white teachers treated Black students. The Citizens Advisory Committee on Equal Educational Opportunities reported a pattern of discrimination in the assignment of teachers and principals in Detroit schools. It also found "grave discrimination" in employment, and in training opportunities in apprenticeship programs. It was dissatisfied with the rate of desegregation in attendance boundaries. The school board accepted the recommendations made by the committee, but faced increasing community pressure. The NAACP demanded affirmative action hiring of school personnel and increased desegregation through an "open schools" policy. Foreshadowing the break between black civil rights groups and Black nationalists after the riot, a community group led by Rev. Albert Cleage, Group of Advanced Leadership (GOAL), emphasized changes in textbooks and classroom curriculum as opposed to integration. Cleage wanted Black teachers to teach Black students in Black studies, as opposed to integrated classrooms where all students regardless of race were held to the same academic standards.

In April and May 1966, a student protest at Detroit Northern High School made headlines throughout the city. Northern was 98% Black and had substandard academic testing scores. A student newspaper article, censored by the administration, claimed teachers and the principal "taught down" to Black students and used social promotion to graduate kids without educating them. Students walked out and set up a temporary "Freedom School" in a neighborhood church, which was staffed by many volunteer Wayne State University faculty. By May sympathy strikes were planned at Eastern, and Rev. Albert Cleage had taken up the cause. When the school board voted to remove the principal and vice principal, as well as the single police officer assigned to Northern, whites regarded the board's actions as capitulation to "threats" and were outraged the "students were running the school". City residents voted against a school-tax increase.

Under the Cavanagh administration, the school board created a Community Relations Division at the deputy superintendent level. Arthur L. Johnson, the former head of the Detroit chapter of the NAACP, was hired in 1966 to advance community involvement in schools, and improve "intergroup relations and affirmative action." Black dominated schools in the city continued to be overcrowded as well as underfunded.

=== Retail stores and services ===
Customer surveys published by the Detroit Free Press indicated that Black people were disproportionately unhappy with the way store owners treated them compared to whites. In stores serving Black neighborhoods, owners engaged in "sharp and unethical credit practices" and were "discourteous if not abusive to their customers". The NAACP, Trade Union Leadership Council (TULC), and Congress of Racial Equality (CORE) all took up this issue with the Cavanagh administration before the riot. In 1968, the Archdiocese of Detroit published one of the largest shopper surveys in American history. It found that the Black shopper paid 20% more for food and groceries than the suburbanites at the time. Some of the differences were due to economies of scale in larger suburban stores, as well as ease in transportation and delivery of goods.

Shortly after the Detroit riot, Mayor Jerome Cavanagh lashed out at the "profiteering" of merchants and asked the city council to pass an anti-gouging ordinance.

== Events ==
The crimes reported to police included looting, arson, and sniping. These crimes took place in many different areas of Detroit after the raid of an unlicensed drinking club. The Detroit Police Department, Michigan State Police, National Guard, and federal troops were deployed into riot areas. The riots lasted a total of 6 days, from July 23 to July 28.

=== July 23 ===
==== Arrest of party guests ====
In the early hours of Sunday (3:45 a.m.), July 23, 1967, Detroit Police Department (DPD) officers raided an unlicensed weekend drinking club (known locally as a blind pig) in the office of the United Community League for Civic Action, above the Economy Printing Company, at 9125 12th Street. They expected a few revelers inside, but instead found a party of 85 people celebrating the return of two local GIs from the Vietnam War. The police decided to arrest everyone present. While they were arranging for transportation, a sizable crowd of onlookers gathered on the street, having witnessed the raid. Later, in a memoir, William Walter Scott III, a doorman whose father was running the raided blind pig, took responsibility for starting the riot by inciting the crowd and throwing a bottle at a police officer.

==== Beginning of looting ====
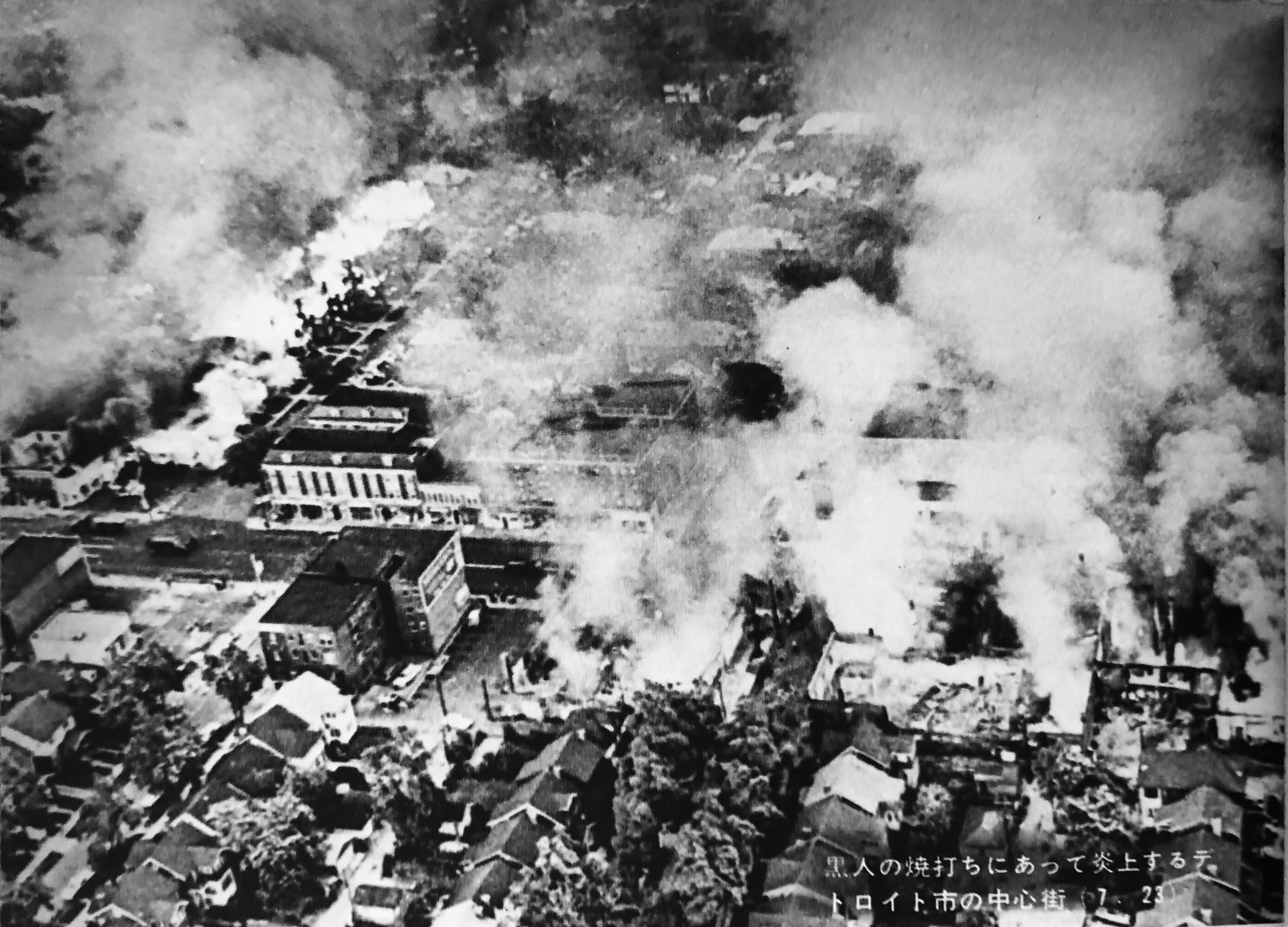
Smoke from fires rise to the sky, taken on July 23

After the DPD left, the crowd began looting the adjacent shoe and clothing store, Parker Brothers Shoes and Menswear. Shortly thereafter, full-scale looting began throughout the neighborhood. The Michigan State Police, Wayne County Sheriff's Department, and the Michigan Army National Guard were alerted, but because it was Sunday, it took hours for Police Commissioner Ray Girardin to assemble sufficient manpower. Meanwhile, witnesses described seeing a "carnival atmosphere" on 12th Street. To the east, on Chene Street, reports said the crowd was of mixed composition. The pastor of Grace Episcopal Church along 12th Street reported that he saw a "gleefulness in throwing stuff and getting stuff out of buildings". The police conducted several sweeps along 12th Street, which proved ineffective because of the unexpectedly large numbers of people outside. The first major fire broke mid-afternoon in a grocery store at the corner of 12th Street and Atkinson.

==== Local responses ====
The local news media initially avoided reporting on the disturbance so as not to inspire copycat violence. By Sunday afternoon, news had spread, and people attending events such as a Fox Theater Motown revue and Detroit Tigers baseball game were warned to avoid certain areas of the city. Motown's Martha Reeves was on stage at the Fox when she asked people to leave quietly, as there was trouble outside. Detroit Tigers general manager Jim Campbell phoned sportscaster Ray Lane with one instruction: "You are not, I repeat not, under any circumstances, to refer to the smoke over the left-field fence." Late in the second game, an announcement was made inside the stadium, telling fans to avoid certain streets, but did not provide a full explanation. After the game, Tigers left fielder Willie Horton, a Detroit resident who had grown up not far from 12th Street, drove to the riot area and stood on a car in the middle of the crowd while still in his baseball uniform. Despite Horton's impassioned pleas, he could not calm the crowd as the crowd was angry of the systemic racism at the time.

Mayor Jerome Cavanagh stated that the situation was "critical" but not yet "out of control." At 7:45 p.m. that first (Sunday) night, Cavanagh enacted a citywide 9:00 p.m. – 5:30 a.m. curfew, prohibited sales of alcohol and firearms, and informally curtailed business activity in recognition of the serious civil unrest engulfing sections of the city at the time. A number of adjoining communities also enacted curfews. There was also a significant white participation in the rioting and looting, raising questions as to whether the event fits into the classical race riot category.

=== July 24 ===
==== Police crackdowns ====
Michigan State Police and the Wayne County Sheriff's Department were called in to Detroit to assist an overwhelmed Detroit police force. As the violence spread, the police began to make numerous arrests to clear rioters off the streets, housing the detainees in makeshift jails. Beginning Monday, people were detained without being brought to Recorder's Court for arraignment. Some gave false names, making the process of identifying those arrested difficult because of the need to take and check fingerprints. Windsor Police were asked to help check fingerprints.

Police began to take pictures of looters arrested, the arresting officer, and the stolen goods, to speed up the process and postpone the paperwork. More than eighty percent of those arrested were Black. About twelve percent were women. Michigan National Guardsmen were not authorized to arrest people, so state troopers and police officers made all arrests without discriminating between civilians and criminals.

==== Partisan political responses ====
Michigan Governor George Romney and President Lyndon B. Johnson initially disagreed about the legality of sending in federal troops. Johnson said he could not send federal troops in without Romney's declaring a "state of insurrection", to meet compliance with the Insurrection Act.

As the historian Sidney Fine details in Violence in the Model City, partisan political issues complicated decisions, as is common in crisis. George Romney was expected to run for the Republican presidential nomination in 1968, and President Johnson, a Democrat, did not want to commit troops solely on Romney's direction. Added to this was Mayor Jerome Cavanagh's own political and personal clash with Romney. Cavanagh, a young Irish Catholic Democrat who had cultivated harmonious relations with Black leaders, both inside and outside the city, was initially reluctant to ask Romney, a Republican, for assistance.

==== Chaos ====
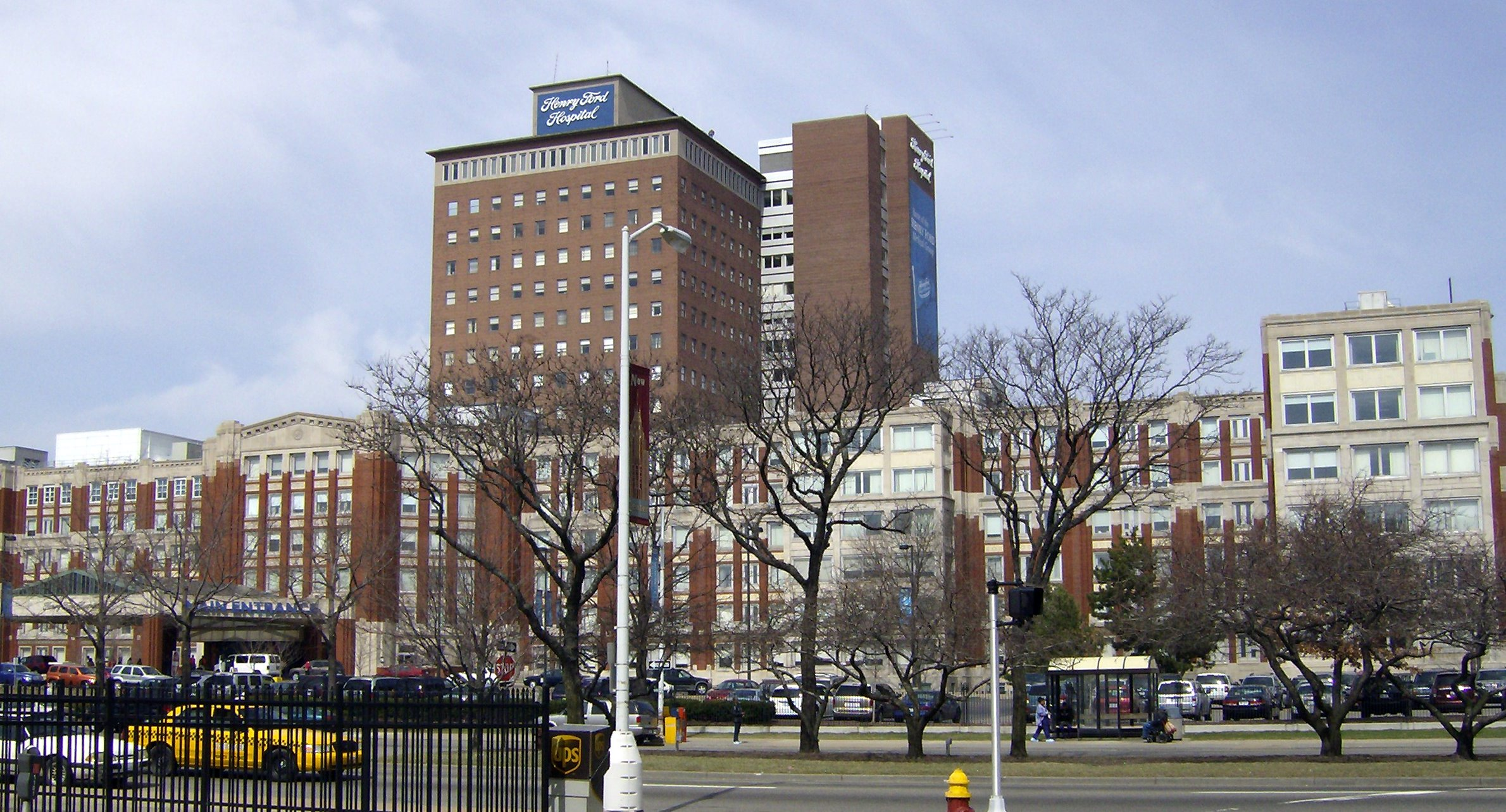
On July 24, forty National Guardsmen were pinned down by snipers at Henry Ford Hospital. The hospital stayed open throughout and treated many injuries.

The violence escalated throughout Monday, resulting in some 483 fires, 231 incidents reported per hour, and 1,800 arrests. Looting and arson were widespread. Black-owned businesses were not spared. One of the first stores looted in Detroit was Hardy's drug store, owned by Black people and known for filling prescriptions on credit. Detroit's leading black-owned women's clothing store was burned, as was one of the city's best-loved Black restaurants. In the wake of the riots, a black merchant said, "you were going to get looted no matter what color you were." Firefighters of the Detroit Fire Department who were attempting to fight the fires were shot at by rioters. During the riots, 2,498 rifles and 38 handguns were stolen from local stores. It was obvious that the City of Detroit, Wayne County, and State of Michigan forces were unable to restore order.

==== John Conyers speech ====
On Monday, U.S. Representative John Conyers (D-Michigan), who was against federal troop deployment, attempted to ease tensions by driving along 12th Street with a loudspeaker asking people to return to their homes. Reportedly, Conyers stood on the hood of the car and shouted through a bullhorn, "We're with you! But, please! This is not the way to do things! Please go back to your homes!" But the crowd refused to listen. Conyers' car was pelted with rocks and bottles.

=== July 25 ===
==== Deaths at the Algiers Motel ====
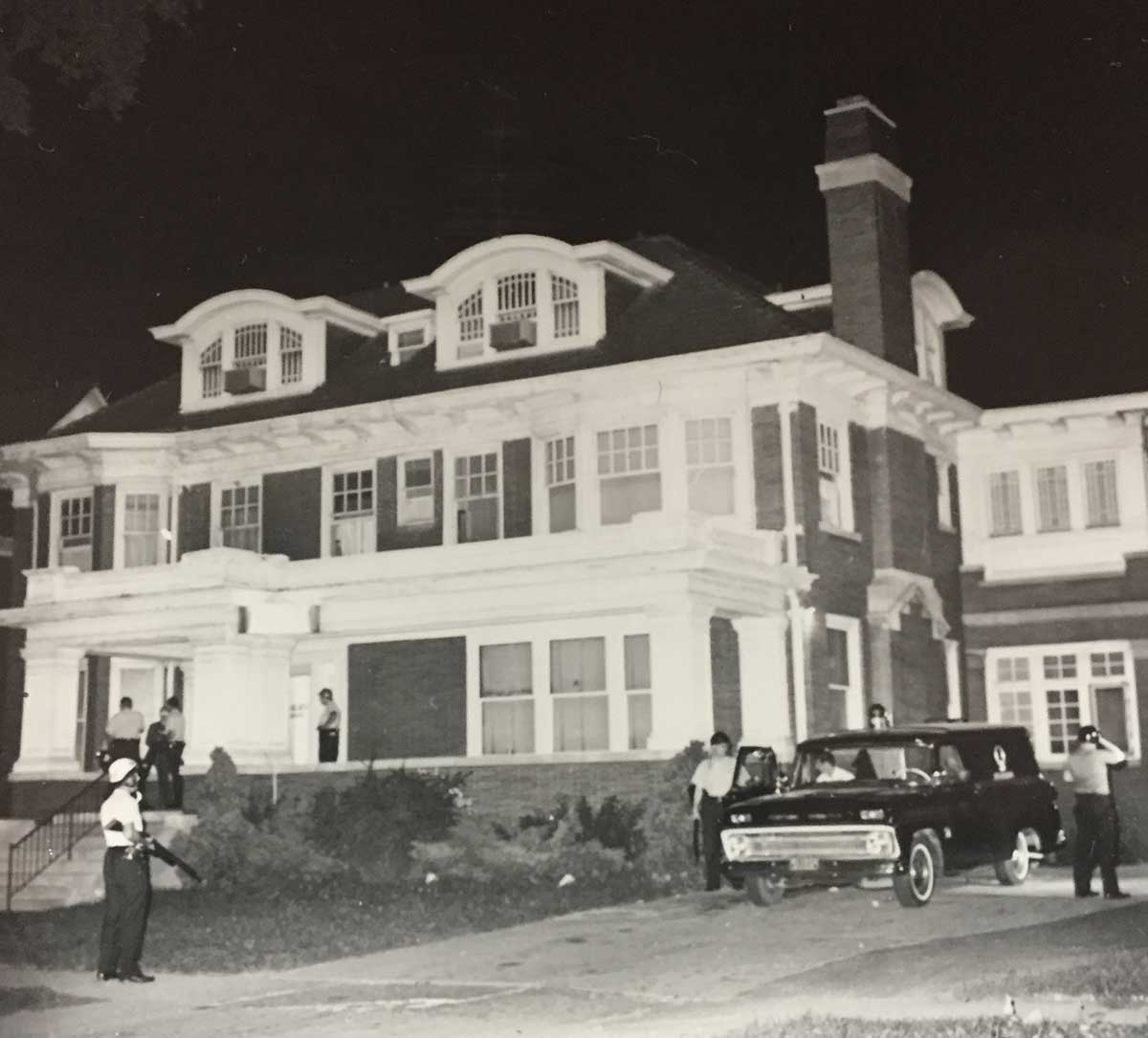
Police stand outside an annex of the Algiers Motel after the bodies of Carl Cooper, Aubrey Pollard, and Fred Temple were found inside

Detroit police officers, Michigan State police officers, Michigan National Guardsmen, and Melvin Dismukes, a security guard, carried out a raid at the Algiers Motel on July 25 in hopes of finding an alleged sniper. Several Black men and two white women, Juli Hysell and Karen Molloy, were present and ultimately involved in the deadly raid. The law enforcement and national guardsmen entered the building and spread most of the people up against the wall. Three of the Black men, Carl Cooper, Aubrey Pollard, and Fred Temple, were shot and killed unarmed by three Detroit police officers, Ronald August, Robert Paille, and David Senak. Cooper, 17-years-old, died first. He was possibly killed during or before the mass interrogation in the lobby area by officer Senak. Cooper's body was found in room A-2. Both Temple and Pollard, 18 and 19-years-old respectively, were found dead in room A-3. Officer Paille was suspected of killing Temple, while officer August was suspected of killing Pollard.

August, Paille, and Senak never mentioned the teenagers' deaths in the police report on the incident at the Algiers Motel. August and Paille, were later charged with murder after they admitted their direct involvement in the killings. August would later be acquitted in Pollard's death after testifying that the teen had tried to grab his gun and August shot him in self-defense. Paille was also acquitted in Temple’s death after his confession was deemed inadmissible. No one was ever charged with Cooper’s death. No convictions were ever made against the three Detroit police officers in connection to the killings.

In addition, law enforcement and national guardsmen then proceeded to buttstroke, beat, and abuse the survivors. The officers and national guardsmen repeatedly taunted the motel guests, using many racial slurs, and allegedly called the two white women "nigger lovers" and stripping them while Dismukes was present. In the aftermath, Senak, Paille, August, and Dismukes were federally charged with conspiracy to violate civil rights and "conspiracy to commit a legal act in an illegal manner." Dismukes was also charged with felony assault. An all-white jury found the four not guilty of the conspiracy charges and they were acquitted. Dismukes was found not guilty of felony assault and acquitted.

The incident at the motel was portrayed in the book The Algiers Motel Incident by John Hersey, and the movie Detroit, a dramatization of the events at the Algiers Motel.

==== Military occupation ====
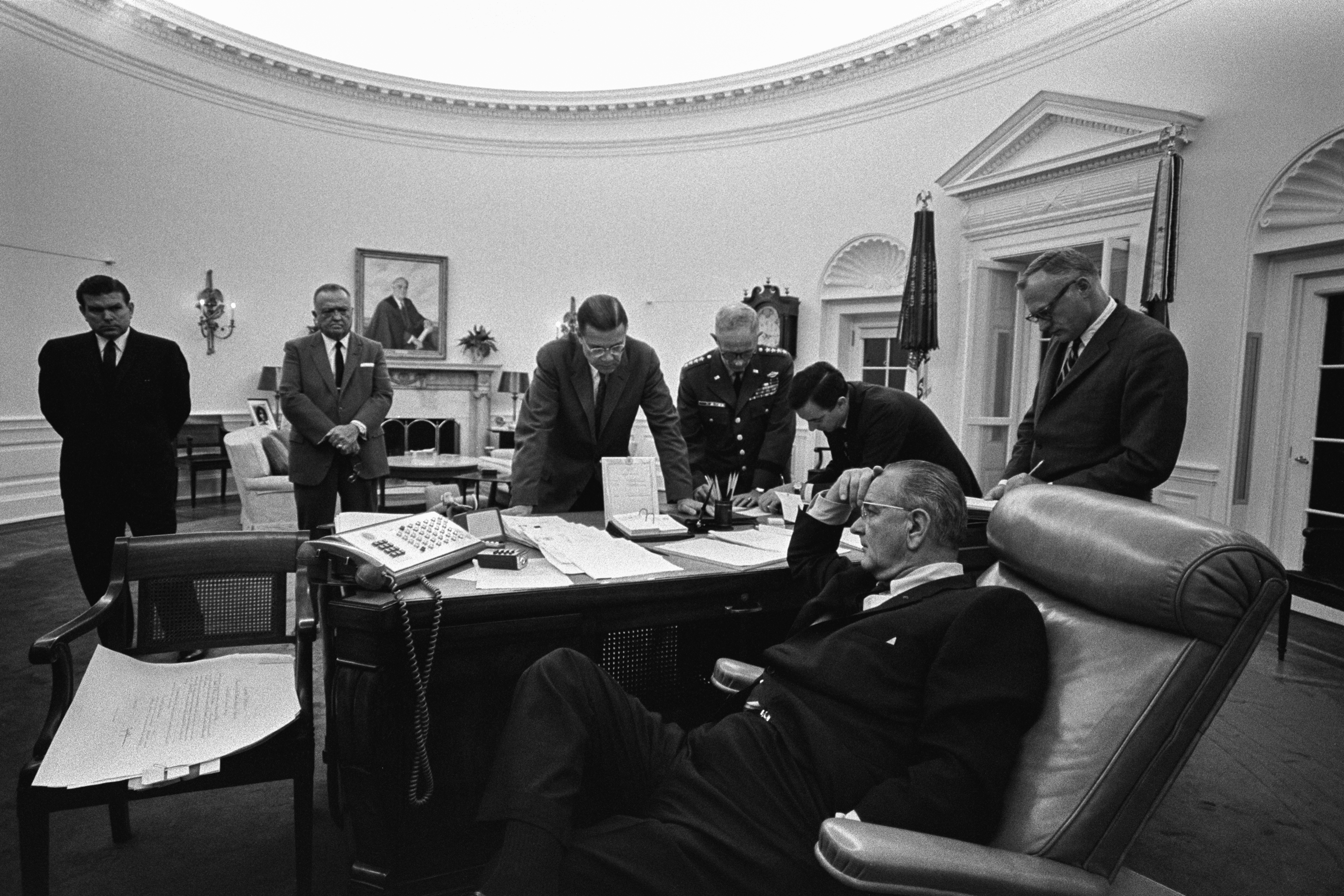
July 24, 1967. President Lyndon B. Johnson (seated, foreground) confers with (background L-R): Marvin Watson, FBI Director J. Edgar Hoover, Secretary of Defense Robert McNamara, General Harold Keith Johnson, Joe Califano, and Secretary of the Army Stanley Rogers Resor, on responding to the riots

Shortly before midnight on Monday, July 24, President Johnson authorized the use of federal troops in compliance with the Insurrection Act of 1807, which authorizes the President to call in armed forces to fight an insurrection in any state against the government. This gave Detroit the distinction of being the only American city to have been occupied by federal troops three times. The United States Army's 82nd Airborne Division and 101st Airborne Division had earlier been positioned at nearby Selfridge Air Force Base in suburban Macomb County. Starting at 1:30 a.m. on Tuesday, July 25, some 8,000 Michigan Army National Guardsmen were deployed to quell the disorder. Later, their number would be augmented with 4,700 paratroopers from both the 82nd and 101st Airborne Divisions, and 360 Michigan State Police officers.

Chaos continued; the police were overworked and tired. Detroit Police were found to have committed many acts of abuse against both Blacks and whites who were in their custody.

Although only 26 of the over 7,000 arrests involved snipers, and not one person accused of sniping was successfully prosecuted, the fear of snipers precipitated many police searches. The "searching for weapons" caused many homes and vehicles to be scrutinized. Curfew violations were also common sparks to police brutality. The Detroit Police's 10th Precinct routinely abused prisoners; as mug shots later proved, many injuries came after booking. Women were stripped and fondled while officers took pictures. White landlords from New York City visiting their building were arrested after a sniper call and beaten so horribly that "their testicles were still black and blue two weeks after the incident."

==== Death of Tanya Blanding ====
A four-year-old girl named Tanya Blanding was shot and killed during the riot while she huddled in the living room of her second-floor apartment, a few steps from the intersection of 12th and Euclid, in the heart of the original riot area (precinct 10).

Sporadic sniper fire had been reported in the immediate area earlier in the evening and on the previous night. Guardsmen reported one of their units under fire at the intersection and believed they had pinpointed it as coming from the apartment in which Tanya and her family lived.

As a tank of the National Guard was being moved into position directly in front of the building, one of the occupants of the Blanding apartment was said to have lit a cigarette. Guardsmen opened fire on the apartment with rifles and the tank's .50 caliber machine gun. At 1:20 a.m. Tanya Blanding was dead.

Sergeant Mortimer J. LeBlanc, 41, admitted firing the burst into the windows of the apartment where Tanya was found, after another Guardsman told him that sniper fire had come from there. Tanya's mother, June, filed a lawsuit for $100,000 in damages, on the grounds that Sgt. LeBlanc fired negligently into the apartment. He was exonerated.

=== July 26 ===
==== Quelling unrest ====
Some analysts believed that violence escalated with the deployment of troops, although they brought rioting under control within 48 hours. Nearly all of the Michigan Army National Guard were exclusively white, inexperienced militarily, and did not have urban backgrounds, while the Army paratroopers were racially integrated and had seen service in Vietnam. As a result, the Army paratroopers were at ease and able to communicate easily in the city while the National Guardsmen were not as effective. The National Guardsmen engaged in what they said were firefights with locals, resulting in the death of one Guardsman. Of the 12 people that troops shot and killed, only one was shot by a federal soldier. Army paratroopers were ordered not to load their weapons except under the direct order of an officer. The Cyrus Vance report made afterward criticized the actions of the National Guardsmen, who shot and killed nine civilians.

Tanks and machine guns were used in the effort to keep the peace. Film footage and photos that were viewed internationally showed a city on fire, with tanks and combat troops in firefights in the streets.

==== Michigan Civil Rights Commission ====
The Michigan Civil Rights Commission intervened in the riot to try to protect the rights of arrestees. The arrival of the CRC was "not well received" by the police, who said the observers were interfering with police work. The Detroit Police Officers Association protested to Romney that "We resent the Civil Rights Commission looking over our shoulders, just waiting for some officer to stub his toe." At one precinct, a white officer "bitterly abused" a black CRC observer, saying that "all people of his kind should be killed."

==== Interracial relief organizations ====
United Press International (UPI) said that "the riots brought out the best, as well as the worst, in people."

As Louis Cassells reported on the ground for UPI:

At a moment when race relations might seem to have sunk to the lowest possible level, whites and Negroes were working together, through their churches, to minister to the hungry and homeless. The effort transcended denominational lines. By Wednesday [July 26, 1967], Protestants, Catholics and Jews had established an interfaith emergency center to coordinate the relief work. District collection centers were set up at scores of churches and synagogues across the city. The food, clothing, bedding and cash contributed through them brought to the interfaith center, from which aid was distributed strictly according to need, without regard for race, creed, or color. Acts of kindness and generosity were not confined to religious groups. Unions, led by the United Auto Workers and the Teamsters, joined with industrial firms in setting up a truck pool to transport relief supplies into the riot area. It was not just a matter of white people being kind to black people. Often it was the other way around, I saw Negro families bringing cool drinks of water to white National Guardsmen standing post in blazing sun. On several occasions, white reporters – trapped on the streets during wild gun battles between Guardsmen and snipers – were taken into the relative safety of nearby Negro homes, even though opening the door to admit them was a real risk to the Negro family. People can be pretty wonderful – even in a riot.

— Louis Cassells, Riots Brought Out the Best, Too

=== July 27–28 ===
By Thursday, July 27, sufficient order had returned to the city that National Guardsmen stationed riot areas were ordered to remove ammunition from their firearms and sheath their bayonets. Troop withdrawal began on Friday, July 28 and completed by Saturday, July 29.

== Reactions ==
=== Nationwide violence ===
The Detroit riot was a catalyst to unrest elsewhere as the riot spread from the city into adjoining suburbs and to other areas of Michigan. Minimal rioting was reported in Highland Park and River Rouge, a heavier police presence was required after a bomb threat was phoned in to an E.J. Korvette store in Southgate. The state deployed National Guardsmen or state police to other Michigan cities as simultaneous riots erupted in Pontiac, Flint, Saginaw, and Grand Rapids, as well as in Toledo and New York City. Disturbances were reported in more than 150 cities, including Newark.

=== Local perceptions ===
Blacks and whites in Detroit viewed the events of July 1967 in very different ways at the time. Part of the process of comprehending the damage was to survey the attitudes and beliefs of Black people in Detroit. Sidney Fine's chapter, "The Polarized Community," cites many of the academic and Detroit Free Press-financed public opinion surveys conducted in the wake of the riot. Although Black Nationalism was thought to have been given a boost by the civil strife, as membership in Albert Cleage's church grew substantially and the New Detroit committee sought to include Black leadership like Norvell Harrington and Frank Ditto, it was whites who were much more likely to support separation.

One percent of African-Americans in Detroit favored "total separation" between the races in 1968, whereas 17 percent of Detroit whites did. African-Americans supported racial integration by 88 percent, while only 24 percent of whites supported integration. Residents of the 12th Street area differed significantly from Black people in the rest of the city at the time however. For example, 22 percent of 12th Street Black people thought they should "get along without whites entirely" at the time. Nevertheless, the Detroit Free Press survey of Black Detroiters in 1968 showed that the highest approval rating for people was given to conventional politicians like Charles Diggs (27 percent) and John Conyers (22 percent) compared to Albert Cleage (4 percent).

== Damages ==
43 were dead, 33 of whom were Black and 10 white. 1,189 people were injured, and 7,231 people were arrested. 2,509 businesses reported looting or damage, 388 families were rendered homeless or displaced. Dollar losses from property damage ranged from $40 million to $45 million. Mayor Jerome Cavanagh lamented upon surveying the damage, "Today we stand amidst the ashes of our hopes. We hoped against hope that what we had been doing was enough to prevent a riot. It was not enough." The scale of the riot was the worst in the United States since the 1863 New York City draft riots during the American Civil War, and was not surpassed until the 1992 Los Angeles riots 25 years later. 11% of the Black Detroiters self-reported participation in the riots.

=== Joe's Record Shop ===
Joe's Record Shop on 8434 12th Street, owned by Joe Von Battle, was one of the businesses that was destroyed in the 1967 Detroit Riot. The business was founded in 1945, on 3530 Hastings Street, where Battle sold records and recorded music with artists like John Lee Hooker, The Reverend C.L. Franklin and Aretha Franklin. He operated from the Hastings store until 1960 when the street was razed in order to build the Chrysler Freeway. Battle along with other business owners on Hastings St. moved to 12th Street, where his shop operated until the events of July 23, 1967. During the '67 riots, Battle stood guard in front of his shop with his gun and his "Soul Brother" sign. After the first day of rioting, police authorities no longer permitted business owners to guard their shops. Days later, Battle returned to his record shop with his daughter Marsha Battle Philpot and they were met with "wet, fetid debris of what had been one of the most seminal record shops in Detroit." Joe's Record Shop and much of the stock within – including tapes and recordings of musicians – were ruined. Ultimately, Battle's store was unable to reopen due to the damage caused by the 1967 riot.

=== Deaths ===
A total of 43 people died: 33 were Black and 10 were white. Among the black deaths, 14 were shot by police officers; 9 were shot by National Guardsmen; 6 were shot by store owners or security guards; 2 were killed by asphyxiation from a building fire; 1 was killed after stepping on a downed power line; and 1 was shot by a federal soldier. It has been suggested that the presence of snipers was imagined or exaggerated by officials, and some of the military and law enforcement casualties could have instead been friendly fire.

One Black civilian, Albert Robinson, was killed by a National Guardsman responding with Detroit Police to an apartment building on the city's west side. Ernest Roquemore, a Black teenager who was the last to die in the civil unrest, was killed by Army paratroopers on July 29 when caught in their crossfire directed toward someone else. The police shot three other individuals during the same firefight, with one victim needing his leg amputated. Jack Sydnor was a Black sniper who fired upon police and wounded one police officer in the street. Sydnor was shot by police in his third-floor apartment on Hazelwood Street. There were no other snipers killed, making Sydnor the only sniper killed during the riot.

Among the whites who died were 6 civilians, 2 firefighters, 1 police officer, and 1 Guardsman. Of the white sworn personnel killed, 2 firefighters died, with 1 stepping on a downed power line during attempts to extinguish a fire started by looters, while the other was shot while organizing fire units at Mack and St. Jean streets; 1 officer was shot by another police officer while struggling with a group of looters; and 1 Guardsman was shot by fellow Guardsmen while being caught in the crossfire by fellow National Guardsmen firing on a vehicle which failed to stop at the roadblock. Of the white civilians killed, 2 were shot by National Guardsmen, of whom 1 was staying at her hotel room and was mistaken for a sniper; 1 was shot as she and her husband tried to drive away from a group of rioters; 1 was shot by police while working as a security guard trying to protect a store from looters; 1 was beaten to death by a rioter after confronting looters in his store; and 1 white looter was killed by police while trying to steal a car part at a junkyard on the outskirts of the city.

=== List of deaths ===
Name	Skin color	Age	Date	Description of Death
Willie Hunter	Black	26	July 23, 1967	Found in the basement of Brown's Drug Store; believed to have died when the store burned down.
Prince Williams	Black	32	July 23, 1967	Found in the basement of Brown's Drug Store; believed to have died when the store burned down.
Sheren George	White	23	July 24, 1967	Shot in the chest during the late hours of July 23 while riding in a car by an unknown shooter when her husband tried to drive past a mob. Died of her gunshot wound a day later shortly after 1:00 am.
Walter Grzanka	White	45	July 24, 1967	Shot by shopkeeper while looting Temple Market on Fourth Street. The first official fatality of the riot. Grzanka had cigars, tobacco packages, and shoelaces in his pockets when he died.
Clifton Pryor	White	23	July 24, 1967	Mistaken for a sniper while trying to keep sparks from a neighboring fire off the roof of his apartment building; shot by a National Guardsman.
Herman Ector	Black	30	July 24, 1967	Shot by Waverly Solomon, an unlicensed security guard who claimed that his rifle went off when Ector tried to grab it.
Fred Williams	Black	49	July 24, 1967	Electrocuted when he stepped on a downed power line next to his burned residence.
Daniel Jennings	Black	36	July 24, 1967	Broke into Stanley Meszczenski’s drugstore at 6000 John R St; shot by the store owner Stanley Meszezenski.
Robert Beal	Black	49	July 24, 1967	Shot by a Detroit police officer at an auto parts store, apparently looting.
Joseph Chandler	Black	34	July 24, 1967	Shot by Detroit police fleeing after engaging in looting at the Food Time Market.
Herman Canty	Black	46	July 24, 1967	Shot by police driving a van with stolen merchandise from the Bi-Lo Supermarket. Canty was found dead inside with a bullet wound to the neck.
Alfred Peachlum	Black	35	July 24, 1967	Apparently looting A&P supermarket, Peachlum was inside with a shiny object in his hand. Police opened fire. The object turned out to be a piece of meat wrapped in foil.
Alphonso Smith	Black	35	July 24, 1967	Shot by police inside the Standard Food Market.
Nathaniel Edmonds	Black	23	July 24, 1967	Richard Shugar, a 25-year-old white male, accused Edmonds of breaking into a store, and shot him with a shotgun. Shugar was convicted of second-degree murder and sentenced to life in prison. The prosecution contended that he had been "on a hunting expedition that ended in an execution."
Charles Kemp	Black	35	July 24, 1967	Kemp stolen cigars from Borgi Market. Detroit police patrolmen James O'Neil and James Dennerly accompanied a National Guardsman, who shot Kemp from the patrolmen's police car.
Richard Sims	Black	35	July 24, 1967	Shot by four policemen after he was spotted trying to break into the Hobby Bar.
Carl Smith	White	30	July 24, 1967	A firefighter; shot on the corner of Mack Avenue and St. Jean Street. Possibly shot by a sniper.
Emanuel Cosby	Black	26	July 24, 1967	Broke into N&T Market; police arrived just as he was making his escape. Cosby ran and was shot while running away with his loot.
Frank Tanner	Black	19	July 25, 1967	Broke into a store with his friends, allegedly stealing alcohol and a cardboard box, when he was shot on July 24 while trying to escape a National Guardsman and Detroit police. He died the next day after police transported his body to a local hospital that mourning.
Julius Dorsey	Black	55	July 25, 1967	Worked as a security guard; shot by a National Guardsman who was pursuing suspected looters.
Henry Denson	Black	27	July 25, 1967	Shot dead by the National Guard about 2:10 a.m. after the car he was riding in allegedly ran a checkpoint on Mack Ave.
Jerome Olshove	White	27	July 25, 1967	The only policeman killed in the riot. Olshove was shot by another officer's shotgun in a scuffle with a looter outside an A&P supermarket.
William Jones	Black	28	July 25, 1967	Broke into Bob's Market. Was caught stealing beer and attempted escape. He shot multiple times by Detroit police and National Guard.
Ronald Evans	Black	24	July 25, 1967	Shot with William Jones after looting Bob's Market.
Arthur Johnson	Black	36	July 25, 1967	Shot inside looted pawn shop.
Perry Williams	Black	36	July 25, 1967	Shot with Johnson inside pawn shop.
Jack Sydnor	Black	38	July 25, 1967	The only known sniper was killed by police at 9:45 p.m. He fired a .32 caliber pistol out the third-story window of his apartment building. Wounding Detroit police officer, Roger Polke. Sydnor was apparently drunk.
Tanya Blanding	Black	4	July 25, 1967	Killed by .50-caliber machine-gun fire from a tank directed at her family’s second-floor apartment at 1756 W. Euclid St in Detroit. The National Guard tank commander who ordered the bursts believed sniper fire was originating from the building.
William N. Dalton	Black	19	July 26, 1967	On July 26, Dalton was accused of being an arsonist and looter, who was initially detained for a curfew violation, by Detroit police officers. Despite Dalton refuting these accusations, the officers took him to an alley and shot him. The DPD classified his death as justifiable homicide because he ran from police, but witness accounts state that the officers goaded him to run by threatening to shoot him if he didn't.
Helen Hall	White	51	July 26, 1967	Hall was visiting Detroit on business and stayed at the Harlan House Motel. Hearing tanks rolling by, she peeked through the drape window to see what was going on. She was most likely shot by National Guardsmen in the chest, who mistook her as a sniper. The DPD Homicide Bureau conducted an investigation and concluded that a sniper had killed Hall. Although, the Detroit Free Press concluded in a September 1967 report that she was killed by a bullet from police or National Guardsmen, not a sniper.
Larry Post	White	26	July 26, 1967	The only National Guardsman to die was accidentally killed in friendly fire by fellow guardsmen opening fire on a car with three white males that reportedly ran a roadblock at Dexter Avenue and Richton Street.
Carl Cooper	Black	17	July 26, 1967	Killed by Detroit Police Officer David Senak in the Algiers Motel.
Aubrey Pollard	Black	19	July 26, 1967	Killed by Detroit Police Officer Ronald August in the Algiers Motel.
Fred Temple	Black	18	July 26, 1967	Killed by Detroit Police Officer Robert Paille in the Algiers Motel.
Julius Lust	White	26	July 26, 1967	Shot dead by police about 10 p.m. while trying to steal car parts at the G & W Auto Parts junkyard.
Willie McDaniels	Black	23	July 27, 1967	Shot in the head by police on July 26, around 2:30 p.m. after fleeing the Domestic Outfitting store. Died the following evening.
Krikor "George" Messerlian	White	68	July 27, 1967	Beaten on July 23 while defending his shoe repair shop at 7711 Linwood St. Died of his injuries 4 days later.
John Leroy	Black	30	July 28, 1967	On July 25, Leroy was a passenger in a vehicle when National Guardsmen opened fire after the driver apparently drove pass a roadblock. Died three days later.
Ernest Roquemore	Black	19	July 29, 1967	Shot accidentally by a paratrooper who was aiming at an armed suspect. Pronounced dead at 7:40 p.m.
John Ashby	White	26	August 4, 1967	A Detroit firefighter was electrocuted on July 24 by a high-tension wire that had fallen while he was trying to put out a fire at Canton and Lafayette streets.
George Tolbert	Black	20	August 5, 1967	Unarmed pedestrian shot on July 28, around 5 p.m. by a National Guardsman as he walked on LaSalle Gardens South, near 12th Street. Died from his injuries at Henry Ford Hospital. The National Guard claimed he was shot for refusing to obey an order to halt.
Albert Robinson	Black	38	August 5, 1967	Shot and bayoneted by National Guardsmen Wednesday evening, July 26 after they stormed an apartment building at Davison and LaSalle Boulevard in search of snipers. Died from his injuries at Detroit General Hospital.
Roy Banks	Black	46	August 14, 1967	Banks was a deaf and mute man walking to a bus stop to go to work; he was shot by Guardsmen on July 27, who claimed he was looting a bar. Died of his injuries 18 days later.

== Effects ==
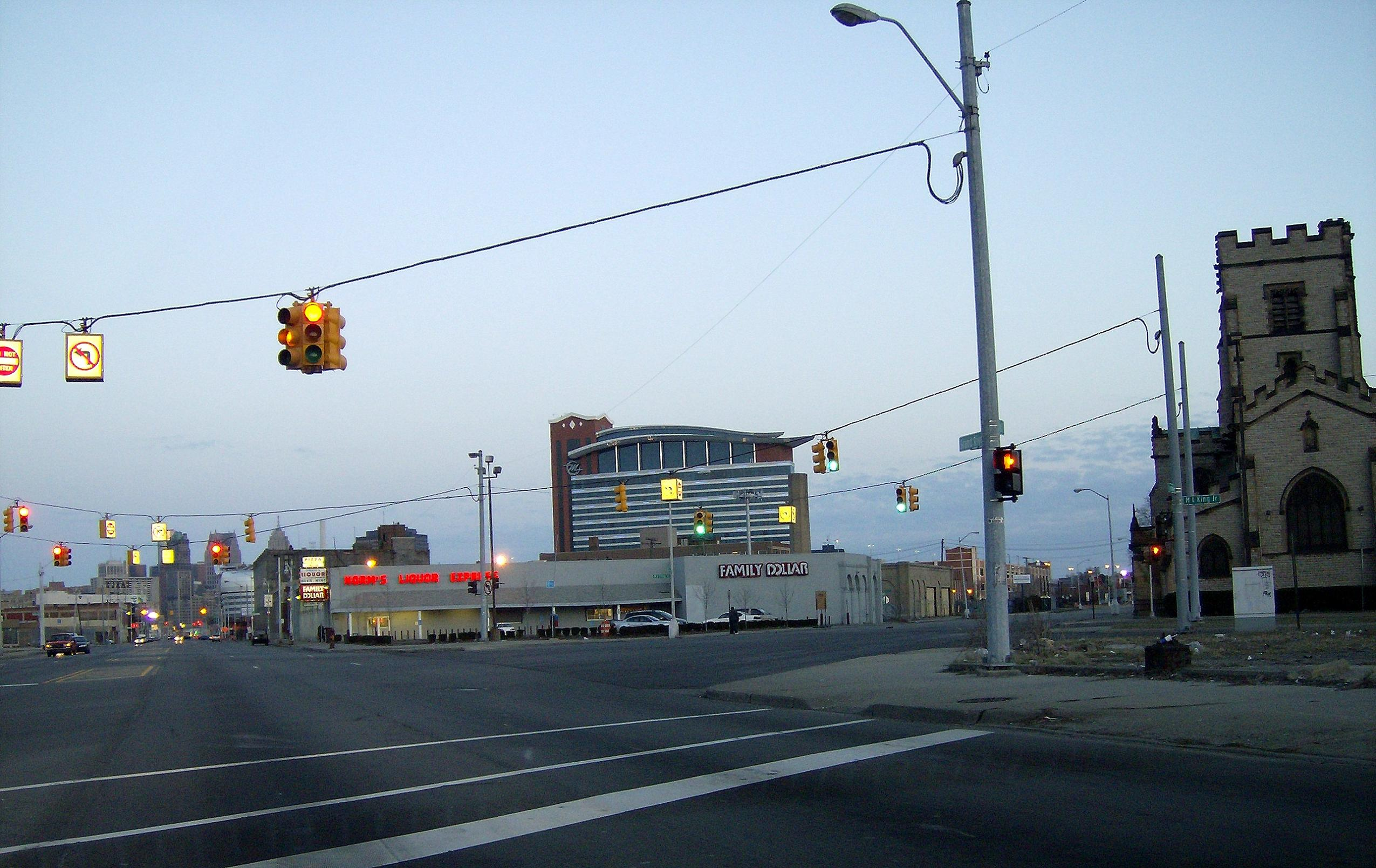
Grand River Avenue was the western perimeter of looting and arson in 1967. Forty years later, it is home to one of Detroit's three casino hotels, the Motor City Casino and lots of revitalization in Detroit overall.

=== Local political strife ===
One of the criticisms of the New Detroit committee, an organization founded by Henry Ford II, J.L. Hudson, and Max Fisher while the embers were still cooling, was that it gave credibility to “radical” Black organizations in a misguided attempt to listen to the concerns of the "inner-city Negro" and "the rioters." Moderate Black leaders such as Arthur L. Johnson were weakened and intimidated by the new credibility the rebellion gave to some Black radical at the time, some of whom favored "a black republic carved out of five southern states" and supported "breaking into gun shops to seize weapons."

The Kerner Commission deputy director of field operations in Detroit reported that the most militant organizers in the 12th Street area did not consider it immoral to kill whites but this was not the majority of protesters in Detroit at the time.

Adding to the criticism of the New Detroit committee in both the Black and white communities was the belief that the wealthy, white industrial leadership were giving voice and money to “radical” Black groups as a sort of "riot insurance." The fear that "the next riot" would not be localized to Black neighborhoods but would include the white suburbs was common in the black middle class and white communities. White groups like "Breakthrough" started by city employee Donald Lobsinger, a Parks and Recreation Department employee, wanted to arm whites and keep them in the city because if Detroit "became black" there would be "guerrilla warfare in the suburbs".

=== Racial and economic shifts and eventual Revitalization ===
Detroit Councilman Mel Ravitz said the riot divided not only the races – since it "deepened the fears of many whites and raised the militancy of many blacks" – but it opened up wide cleavages within Black and white communities as well. Moderate liberals of each race were faced with new political groups that voiced extremist solutions and fueled fears about future violence. Compared to the rosy newspaper stories before July 1967, the London Free Press reported in 1968 that Detroit was a "sick city where fear, rumor, race prejudice and gun-buying have stretched black and white nerves to the verge of snapping." Sidney Fine wrote that if the riot is interpreted as a protest, or a way for Black grievances to be heard and addressed, it was partly successful.

The riot markedly increased the pace of Detroit's white residents moving out of the city at the time. From 1967 to 1969, 173,000 white residents left, and from 1967 to 1978, Detroit public schools lost 74% of its white students.

The Black community in Detroit received much more attention from federal and state governments after 1967, and although the New Detroit committee ultimately shed its Black membership and transformed into the mainstream Detroit Renaissance group, money did flow into Black-owned enterprises after the riot. However, the most significant Black politician to take power in the shift from a white majority city to a Black majority city, Coleman Young, Detroit's first black mayor, wrote in 1994:

The heaviest casualty, however, was the city. Detroit's losses went a hell of a lot deeper than the immediate toll of lives and buildings. The riot put Detroit on the fast track to economic desolation, mugging the city and making off with incalculable value in jobs, earnings taxes, corporate taxes, retail dollars, sales taxes, mortgages, interest, property taxes, development dollars, investment dollars, tourism dollars, and plain damn money. The money was carried out in the pockets of the businesses and the white people who fled as fast as they could. The white exodus from Detroit had been prodigiously steady prior to the riot, totaling twenty-two thousand in 1966, but afterwards it was frantic. In 1967, with less than half the year remaining after the summer explosion – the outward population migration reached sixty-seven thousand. In 1968 the figure hit eighty-thousand, followed by forty-six thousand in 1969.

In 2010, Thomas Sowell, a conservative and senior fellow at the Hoover Institution, wrote in an opinion article for a website created by The Heritage Foundation:

Before the ghetto riot of 1967, Detroit's black population had the highest rate of home-ownership of any black urban population in the country, and their unemployment rate was just 3.4 percent. It was not despair that fueled the riot. It was the riot which marked the beginning of the decline of Detroit to its current state of despair. Detroit's population today is only half of what it once was, and its most productive people have been the ones who fled.

Detroit has recently been growing in population and now leads the state of Michigan in population growth, the revival of Detroit has also seen its lowest homicide rate since 1965 and declining even further the next year.

=== Riot control strategies ===
Nationally, the riot confirmed for the military and the Johnson administration that military occupation of American cities would be necessary. In particular, the riot confirmed the role of the Army Operations Center as the agent to anticipate and combat Black protesters.

=== Minority hiring ===
State and local governments responded to the riot with a dramatic increase in minority hiring. On August 18, 1967, the State Police department swore in the first Black trooper in the fifty-year history of the organization. In May 1968, Detroit Mayor Cavanaugh appointed a Special Task Force on Police Recruitment and Hiring. Thirty-five percent of the police hired by Detroit in 1968 were black, and by July 1972, blacks made up 14 percent of the Detroit police, more than double their percentage in 1967. The Michigan government used its reviews of contracts issued by the state to secure an increase in nonwhite employment. Minority group employment by the contracted companies increased by 21.1 percent.

In the aftermath of the turmoil, the Greater Detroit Board of Commerce launched a campaign to find jobs for ten thousand "previously unemployable" persons, a preponderant number of whom were Black. By October 12, 1967, Detroit firms had reportedly hired about five thousand African-Americans since the beginning of the jobs campaign; according to Professor Sidney Fine, "that figure may be an underestimate." In a Detroit Free Press survey of residents of the riot areas in the late summer of 1968, 39 percent of the respondents thought that employers had become "more fair" since the riot as compared to 14 percent who thought they had become "less fair."

After the riot, in one of the biggest changes, automakers and retailers lowered the entry-level job requirements. A Michigan Bell employment supervisor commented in 1968 that "for years businesses tried to screen people out. Now we are trying to find reasons to screen them in."

=== Housing laws ===
Prior to the disorder, Detroit enacted no ordinances to end housing segregation, and few had been enacted in the state of Michigan at all. Some liberal politicians had worked for fair housing over the years, but white conservative resistance to it was organized and powerful. The reactionary movement began to wither after the insurrection. Sidney Fine noted that:

The Detroit riot of 1967 and the racial disturbances it triggered elsewhere in the state, including Flint and Pontiac, swelled the number of Michigan Cities with fair housing ordinances to fifteen by November 1967, the largest number in any state at that time, and to thirty-five by October 1968, including some of the Detroit suburbs that had previously been almost entirely white.

Governor Romney immediately responded to the turmoil with a special session of the Michigan legislature, where he forwarded sweeping housing proposals that included not only fair housing, but "important relocation, tenants' rights and code enforcement legislation." Romney had supported such proposals before in 1964 and 1965, but abandoned them in the face of organized opposition. In the aftermath of the insurrection, the proposals again faced resistance from organized white homeowners and the governor's own Republican party, which once again voted down the legislation in the House. This time, however, Romney did not relent and once again proposed the housing laws at the regular 1968 session of the legislature.

The governor publicly warned that if the housing measures were not passed, "it will accelerate the recruitment of revolutionary insurrectionists." He urged "meaningful fair housing legislation" as "the single most important step the legislature can take to avert disorder in our cities." This time the laws passed both houses of the legislature. The Michigan Historical Review wrote that:

The Michigan Fair Housing Act, which took effect on Nov 15, 1968, was stronger than the federal fair housing law ... and than just about all the existing state fair housing acts. It is probably more than a coincidence that the state that had experienced the most severe racial disorder of the 1960s also adopted one of the strongest state fair housing acts.

=== Stop the Robberies, Enjoy Safe Streets (STRESS) ===
Two years after the end of the 1967 riot, Wayne County Sheriff Roman Gribbs, who was seen by many white Detroiters as their last "white hope" in a city with a growing Black population, created the Stop the Robberies, Enjoy Safe Streets (STRESS) campaign, a secret and elite police unit that enabled police brutality.

STRESS used a tactic called "decoy operation", in which police officers tried to entrap potential criminals in an undercover sting. From its inception, STRESS all but ignored white criminals, instead focusing their operations on Black communities, and increased confrontations between the Black community and police. During its first year of operation, the Detroit Police Department had the "highest number of civilian killings per capita of any American police department." The unit was accused of conducting 500 raids without the use of search warrants and killing 20 people within 30 months, and this fostered an unhealthy fear and hatred between the black community and the police force.

Community groups did not take long to start responding to STRESS's activities. On September 23, 1971, the State of Emergency Committee was formed to protest the killings, and thousands of people marched to demand the abolition of STRESS.

Following Senator Richard Austin, the first black person in various political and professional positions, came Senator Coleman Young. In contrast to Senator Austin's quiet and accommodating political style, Young developed a liberal, combative political style in the labor and Black radical movements of the late 1930s. Young helped organize the National Negro Labor Council (NNLC) and became its executive director. Finding himself in a position of national power, he said to his committee: "I am a part of the Negro people. I am now in process of fighting against what I consider to be attacks and discrimination against my people. I am fighting against un-American activities such as lynching and denial of the vote. I am dedicated to that fight and I don't think I have to apologize or explain it to anybody" (Foner, 1981; Young and Wheeler, 1995: 128). This statement really reflected the views of the Black people in Detroit at this time. With his position and emerging national attention, the black community began rallying behind Young for mayor in place of Roman Gribbs. Young began building part of his campaign upon what he believed to be one of the major problems for a city divided by race: STRESS. Young said, "one of the problems is that the police run the city... STRESS is responsible for the explosive polarization that now exists; STRESS is an execution squad rather than an enforcement squad. As mayor, I will get rid of STRESS" (Detroit Free Press, May 11, 1973). He added, "the whole attitude of the whole Police Department, historically, has been one of intimidation and that citizen can be kept in line with clubs and guns rather than respect." When Young was elected into office, he represented the fear and loathing of STRESS in the city that would have to be terminated.

STRESS inadvertently promoted Black political power, and the abolishment of the STRESS unit initiated the beginning of bringing Black people into the police department.

This matters in a larger context than simply the immediate implications of STRESS. This unit instigated the mayoral campaign and eventual candidacy of Mayor Coleman Young, who would go on to spend the next 20 years fighting for black rights and reframing the relationship between the police force and the Black community. While the STRESS campaign was important on its own in terms of the individuals killed or families of these individuals, it became radically important for the cultural shift that Mayor Coleman Young would facilitate.

The global context of this campaign changed the trajectory of Black political and professional power and opportunity.

=== Other political impacts ===
In the wake of the riots, a group of several hundred African American activists met in Detroit, where they declared the Republic of New Africa and a provisional government for it. It was the first separate nation declared by African Americans in the United States but was never official.

=== African-American social advances ===
In light of the event, faults in the existing system became apparent and measures were taken to solve the problems. In 1970, First Independence National Bank (now First Independence Bank) gave African Americans capital which was generally inaccessible due to redlining; this provided social mobility and better living conditions.

Others worked with the government to understand the problem, and this research provided the basis for solutions. Wayne State University partnered with the Department of Health, Education, and Welfare to create the Developmental Career Guidance Project, which studied improving the potential for poor students. Its report helped form the backbone of a number of educational programs. Other efforts to heal came from organizations like the Interfaith Action Council, which sought to bring people of different races and religions together to encourage dialogue about racial inequality.

The 1967 riot inspired active measures to overturn stereotypes and solve day-to-day problems, with African Americans resisting inequality in their lives. William Cunningham and Eleanor Josaitis founded HOPE, an organization which targeted hunger and workplace inequality, in 1968. HOPE evolved to provide skills training for young people. General Baker and Ron March led the Dodge Revolutionary Union Movement, seeking a voice in the workplace; Alvin Bush and Irma Craft guided the Career Development Center to provide basic skills training and job placement; and the Volunteer Placement Corps assisted African Americans to obtain a college education.

The most influential change came from African Americans in powerful positions. The riot contributed to African Americans becoming the majority in Detroit, and gave them political power. For the first time in the city's history, African Americans could affect municipal policy. Political figures such as Mayor Coleman Young enacted policies which attempted to integrate the city. Young began with changes to the police and fire departments, implementing a two-list system which gave African Americans an equal chance of promotion; his goal was to balance the departments' racial and gender makeup. Young sought the backing of President Jimmy Carter, allowing money to flow into Detroit for improvements in education and housing. In 1972, Erma Henderson became the first African American woman elected to the Detroit Common Council. She was elected the council's first African American president in 1977. She who fought insurance redlining and discrimination in the judicial system and public spaces.

== Legacy ==
=== Public opinion ===
A poll conducted by EPIC-MRA, a survey research firm, in July 2016 focused on the evolution of black–white relations since the riots. The poll surveyed 600 residents of Macomb, Oakland, and Wayne counties. The poll took place from July 14–19, a time period the Detroit Free Press noted was "during the ongoing national furor over police shooting of African-American civilians, and retaliatory attacks on officers in Dallas and Baton Rouge."

The respondents of the Detroit poll were more optimistic about race relations compared to the national averages. A national Washington Post/ABC News poll found that only 32% of the people they polled believed race relations were good, as opposed to the 56% and 47% of the white and black Detroiters surveyed, respectively. This was unsurprising to Reynold Farley, a retired University of Michigan sociology professor and expert on Detroit racial demographics. "I think it's easier for people in the Detroit area to have some familiarity with race relations than people in a state like Maine, where there's virtually no black population at all and the information comes from seeing violent incidents on television", he explained. In the following question, Farley's claim was validated as the stark contrast in national vs. Detroiter perception of what the future would be like was apparent. As just 10% of those polled by the Washington Post/ABC News believed that race relations we getting better, whereas 33% of white and 22% of black Detroiters thought they had improved over the past 10 years and 50% of white and 41% of blacks believed they would improve over the next five.

Although these responses were encouraging signs of a diminishing racial gap in Detroit, and a heightened attunement to race relations in the city compared to the rest of the nation, other questions concerning white Detroiters' perception of the riots and how the improvement of race relations are actualized in their everyday life show there is still much mending to be done. When asked which word they would use to describe the 1967 riots – riot, rebellion or uprising – the white response was 61%, 12%, 12% and blacks, 34%, 27%, 24%, respectively. The majority of respondents did agree, however, that since the riots they believed there had been significant progress made vs little or no progress. Unfortunately, many black Detroiters still feel as if they are facing the type of discrimination that led to the riots in the first place. The polled black Detroiters reporting that in the past 12 months 28% felt they had been unfairly treated in hiring, pay, or promotion, double the rate of their white counterparts. 73% also believed that they were treated less fairly than whites when attempting to find a "good job".

== In popular culture ==
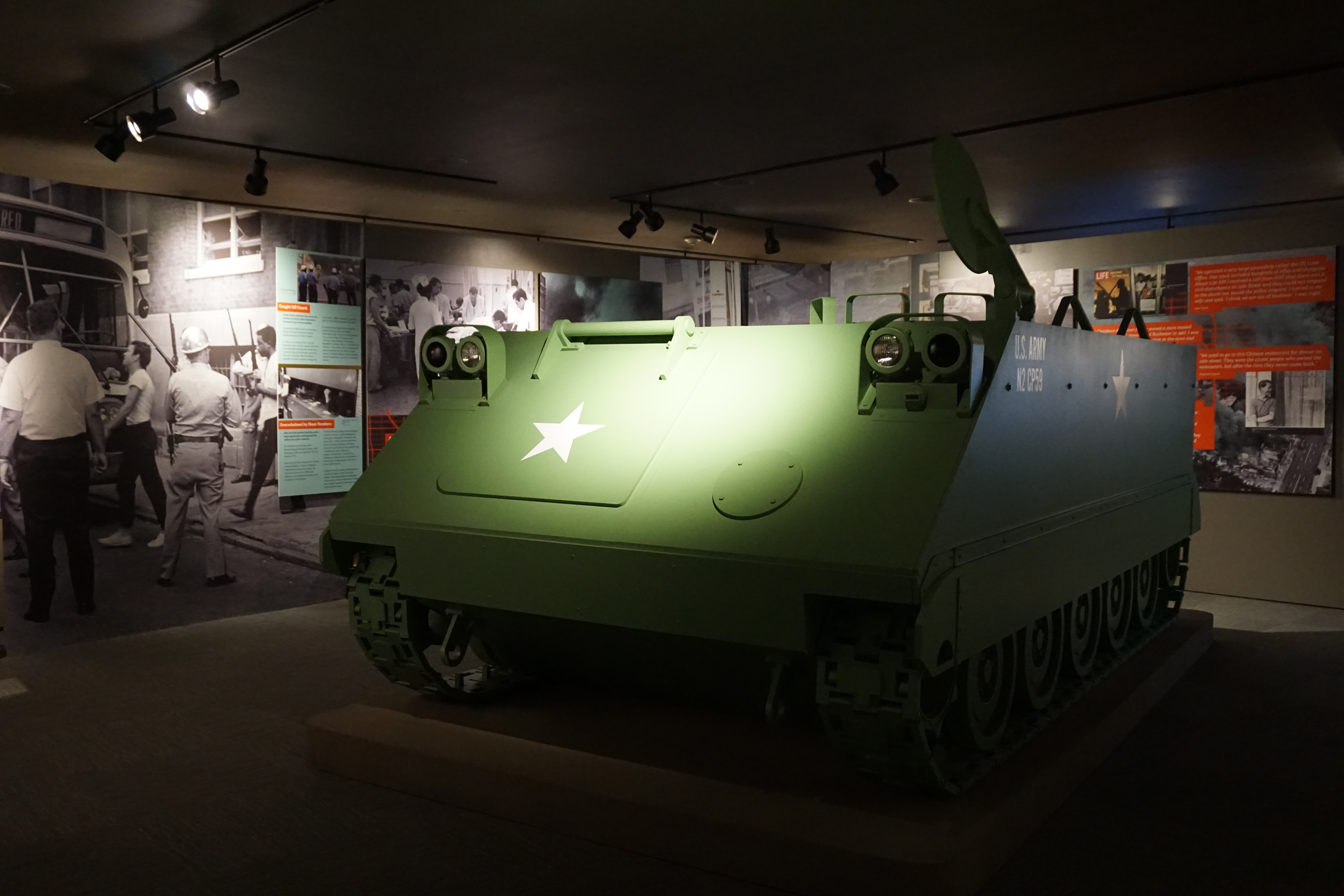
The Detroit '67: Perspectives exhibit at the Detroit Historical Museum

Several songs directly address the riot, including "Black Day in July" by Gordon Lightfoot and "The Motor City Is Burning" by John Lee Hooker.

The 2003 Pulitzer-prize winning novel Middlesex features the riot as one of its main events.

The 2017 film Detroit, directed by Kathryn Bigelow, was a dramatization based on the Algiers Motel killings. Survivors of the incident participated in the production of the film.

== Art influenced by the riots ==
=== Fine art ===
Many artworks were created in response to the 1967 events, a number of which were included in the 2017 exhibition "Art of Rebellion: Black Art of the Civil Rights Movement", curated by Valerie J. Mercer for the Detroit Institute of Arts. Black Attack (1967) was painted by Detroit abstract artist Allie McGhee immediately following the event. The work includes "broad strokes of color that appear spontaneous, give form to the artists memories of strength and resolve of black people facing intense opposition to change."

In 2017, Detroit based artist Rita Dickerson created 1967: Death in the Algiers Motel and Beyond. In the work Dickerson "depicts the Algiers Motel and portraits of three young Black men killed there by police. Below the portraits are the names of men and women who have died in recent years in encounters with police, underscoring the fact that police brutality continues to cost black people their lives."

=== Literary art ===
Bill Harris, a Detroit-based poet, playwright, and educator, wrote about the condition of the Detroit black community – referred to by him as the DBC – after July 1967 in Detroit: a young guide to the city. The book was edited by Sheldon Annis and published by Speedball Publications in 1970.

=== Performing arts ===
Two plays based on firsthand accounts were performed in 2017. Detroit '67 presented recollections from five metro Detroiters at the Charles H. Wright Museum of African American History by the Secret Society of Twisted Storytellers. AFTER/LIFE, performed at the Joseph Walker Williams Recreation Center, presented the events from the perspectives of women and girls.

== See also ==
- Long hot summer of 1967
- King assassination riots of 1968
- Ghetto riots (1964–1969)
- Mass racial violence in the United States
- Crime in Detroit
- Decline of Detroit
- Kerner Commission
- List of ethnic riots § United States
- List of incidents of civil unrest in the United States

=== Other riots in July of 1967 ===
- 1967 Newark riots in New Jersey (July 12–17)
- 1967 Plainfield riots in New Jersey (July 14–16)
- 1967 Minneapolis disturbance in Minnesota (July 20–23)
- 1967 New York City riot (July 23–30)
- Cambridge riot of 1967 in Maryland (July 24)
- 1967 Milwaukee riot in Wisconsin (July 29–31)
- 1967 Riviera Beach riot in Florida (July 30–31)

=== Other riots in Detroit ===
- Detroit race riot of 1863
- Detroit race riot of 1943
- 1968 Detroit riot following the assassination of Martin Luther King, Jr.
- Livernois–Fenkell riot
- 1990 Detroit riot
- List of riots in Detroit

=== Other riots ===
- 1908 Springfield race riot
- 1917 East St. Louis massacre
- 1917 Chester race riot
- 1919 Red Summer
- 1919 Elaine massacre
- 1920 Ocoee massacre
- 1921 Tulsa race massacre
- 1923 Rosewood massacre
- 1965 Watts Riot
- 1968 Washington, D.C., riots
- 1968 Chicago riots
- 1968 Baltimore riots
- 1980 Miami riots
- 1992 Los Angeles riots
- 2011 England Riots
- 2020 George Floyd protests (nationwide protests and unrest following the murder of George Floyd)
