= 1968 Detroit riot =

Civil disturbance

- Part of the King assassination riots
- Date: April 4–5, 1968
- Location: Detroit, Michigan
- Caused by: Assassination of Martin Luther King Jr.

Casualties
- Death: 1

The 1968 Detroit riot was a civil disturbance that occurred between April 4–5, 1968, in Detroit, Michigan following the assassination of Martin Luther King Jr. Less than a year after the violent unrest of 1967, areas of 12th Street (present-day Rosa Parks Boulevard) again erupted in chaos (simultaneously with over 100 other US cities) following King's assassination. Michigan Governor George W. Romney ordered the National Guard into Detroit. One person was killed, and gangs tossed objects at cars and smashed storefront windows with three dozen fires being set.

== See also ==
- List of incidents of civil unrest in the United States

=== Other riots in Detroit ===
- Detroit race riot of 1863
- Detroit race riot of 1943
- 1967 Detroit riot (also erupted on 12th Street)
- Livernois–Fenkell riot
