= List of riots in Detroit =

Riots in Detroit, Michigan, have occurred since the city was founded in 1701. This area was settled by various ethnicities following thousands of years of indigenous history. During the colonial period, it was nominally ruled by France and Great Britain before the border was set in the early 19th century and it became part of the United States. The first riot, social unrest related to enabling fugitive slaves to escape to Canada, was recorded in 1833. Other riots were related to business protests, unions, and other issues.

In the late 20th century, the 1967 Detroit riot broke out, fueled by African-American frustration with continuing racial discrimination and injustice. A total of 43 people died, and property damage was extensive. This was ranked as one of the deadliest civil disturbances in the United States.

== 1833 ==
The first recorded riot in Detroit, Michigan broke out on June 17, 1833. The state had prohibited slavery and was considered free. Because of its proximity to Canada, across the Detroit River, the city became a station on the Underground Railroad by which refugee slaves from the South sought freedom. Some also settled here rather than continuing out of the country.

In 1833 a fugitive slave couple, Thornton and Ruthie Blackburn, had been apprehended by slave catchers in the city and were to be returned to their master in Kentucky, under the US Fugitive Slave Act. A crowd of black residents had gathered at the Wayne County Jail in protest over a court verdict upholding the claim by agents of the Kentucky master. As Thornton Blackburn was led to a waiting steamer by sheriff John Wilson, the sheriff was attacked by a mob. This enabled the Blackburns to escape to Windsor, Ontario. Thirty persons of color were subsequently arrested for conspiring to free the Blackburns, in violation of provisions of the Fugitive Slave Law.

== 1849 ==
On December 13, 1849, more than 60 shop owners along Gratiot Avenue destroyed tracks of the Detroit and Pontiac Railroad, which had been laid along the road and interfered with their businesses. After the tracks were relaid, they were destroyed again by rioters. The railroad rerouted their tracks in 1852.

== 1855–59 ==
During this period, large groups of men, predominantly ethnic German, attacked brothels in the east side German neighborhoods that catered to black men. During this period, there were 12 disturbances in which a total of at least 17 brothels were either seriously damaged or destroyed, all on the east side, around the present-day Lafayette Park area. Usually anywhere between 50 and 300 rioters ordered prostitutes and their customers out of the brothels before vandalizing them.

== 1863 ==
This was a riot of mostly ethnic Irish against blacks, in reaction to the draft. The Irish immigrants did not want to be drafted in the Civil War, as they saw it, for the benefit of African Americans, and the fact that wealthy Americans could buy their way out of the draft. There was wide spread suspicion that Irish troops were intentionally being used in hopeless military situations as opposed to mostly native regiments and the fact that thousands of Irish immigrants had lost their lives in previous battles, particularly the Union Disaster at Fredericksburg. A similar, but larger and more damaging riot occurred in New York City.

== 1891 ==
On April 23, 1891, workers of the privately run trolley system walked off their jobs in protest of pay and conditions. During three days of rioting, in which streetcars were stoned, horses were unhitched, and rails were torn apart. By the third day, rioters formed barriers in some neighborhoods, further crippling transit service. Among the rioters was future Detroit mayor and US Senator James Couzens. A similar streetcar riot broke out in 1918.

== 1894 ==
An ongoing economic depression strained relations among the growing immigrant ethnic communities, Detroit's leaders, and wealthy citizens. On April 18, 1894, mostly Polish immigrant workers on an excavation project for the Water Board, on East Jefferson Avenue near Conner Street, attacked a crowd that had gathered at the site. Three people were killed, including Sheriff C.P. Collins.

== 1942 ==
Detroit, like many industrial cities, had overcrowded housing due to the expansion of population in the defense industries during World War II. Much of it was substandard and the federal government began to build worker housing in an effort to relieve some of the strain. An estimated 1,000-person crowd of mostly ethnic whites gathered on February 28, 1942, at the intersection of Ryan Road and East Nevada Street to protest a black family that was moving into the newly built Sojourner Truth Projects. This federal project was intended for black war workers and had been located in a predominantly white neighborhood, at a time when residential segregation was strong. Police battled rioters for several hours, resulting in dozens of injuries. No further incidents took place, and blacks settled into the buildings.

== 1943 ==
This was another riot related to the social strains produced by rapid demographic changes in the city, and competition for jobs and housing during World War II. In this race riot, mostly whites attacked blacks throughout the city, and especially in their neighborhoods on the east side of Woodward Avenue. Despite the evidence, a commission attributed the troubles to African-American youths.

== 1966 ==
On August 11, 1966, seven black men who had gathered at Kercheval and Pennsylvania streets were asked by police to disperse. Three of them refused. One hundred rioters gathered at the intersection. Rioting continued for two additional days before a rain system brought it to an end.

== 1967 ==
Violence flared between police and black Americans in the early morning hours of July 23, 1967. The confrontation was spurred on by a police raid of an unlicensed, after-hours bar in the Near West Side. The rioting left 43 dead and 1,189 injured, and resulted in 7,200 arrests and more than 2,000 buildings destroyed. It was finally quelled on July 28, 1967. Michigan's Army National Guard and the United States Army's 82nd and 101st Airborne Divisions were called in. The rioting received extensive media coverage and was part of the "Long, hot summer of 1967". Its scale was the worst since the 1863 New York draft riots, even surpassing the 1943 Detroit race riot; it would remain the worst until the 1992 Los Angeles riots, which was also then surpassed by the 2020–2021 United States racial unrest.

== 1968 ==
Rioting erupted again on 12th Street on April 4, 1968, hours after the assassination of Martin Luther King, Jr., the major civil rights leader, in Memphis, Tennessee. Riots erupted as well in 110 other US cities. Governor George W. Romney ordered the National Guard into Detroit to try to restore order. One person was killed, stores were vandalized, and several buildings were set on fire. Order was restored the following day.

== 1975 ==
In July 1975, the white owner of a Livernois Avenue bar shot and killed a black 18-year-old. African Americans began to riot in protest, continuing for two nights, July 28-29.

== 1984 ==
The Tigers won the 1984 World Series in five games, but the celebrations that followed, attended by over 100,000 people, deteriorated into rioting. One person died, several more were injured, one Detroit Police Department car was set on fire, and four others were severely damaged. At one point, about 50 officers in riot gear chased a large crowd of over 6,000 people up Woodward Avenue from Hart Plaza. The rioting was widely reported internationally. Its most famous image was an Associated Press photo of Lincoln Park resident Kenneth "Bubba" Helms posing in front of the police cruiser that was torched.

== 1990 ==
Rioting erupted after the Detroit Pistons won the 1990 NBA Finals. Seven people were killed and a number of stores were looted.

== 2020 ==
Following the murder of George Floyd, protests erupted in downtown Detroit on May 29, 2020, as similar protests erupted across Michigan and the United States. Initially peaceful, the protests eventually turned into rioting after police cruiser windows were smashed along Michigan Avenue in Corktown. Protests resumed on May 30, but after it again erupted into rioting, the protest was declared unlawful by the Detroit Police Department. On Sunday night, May 31, mayor Mike Duggan imposed a curfew from 8 pm to 5 am Monday and more than 100 people were arrested after violence resumed that night. Police Chief Crag stated railroad spikes were hurled at riot police. A glass door at Lafayette Coney Island was smashed, and windows smashed at a federal building as well. On June 3, protesters earned a victory as the city chose not to enforce the curfew.

Protests continued throughout the summer. As protests in Detroit continued, they were mostly peaceful, with only the occasional clash with police.

== See also ==
- Crime in Detroit
- List of riots
- Detroit bankruptcy
