= Crime in Detroit =

Detroit
- Crime rates* (2019)

Violent crimes
- Homicide: 41.4
- Rape: 143.4
- Robbery: 353.3
- Aggravated assault: 1,425.8
- Total violent crime: 1,965.3

Property crimes
- Burglary: 1,027.1
- Larceny-theft: 2,235.5
- Motor vehicle theft: 1,037.0
- Total property crime: 4,299.7
- Note: Reported crimes per 100,000 population Source: FBI 2019 UCR data

As of 2018 Detroit had the fourth highest murder rate among major cities in the United States after St. Louis and Baltimore and the 42nd highest murder rate in the world. The rate of robberies in Detroit declined by 67% between 1985 and 2014 while the rate of aggravated assaults increased. As a whole, the city's crime rate has decreased considerably from its 1980s peak.

In 2017, there were 267 murders in Detroit - down from 303 in 2016. The violent crime rate of 2,057 per 100,000 was the second highest in the nation after St. Louis. It was roughly ten times the average rate of the suburban counties of metro Detroit which had violent crime rates below the national average of 394 per 100,000. In recent years some neighborhoods in the downtown area of Detroit has seen a significant decline in crime, while the crime rate remains high in most of the city.

== History ==
In June 1971, the largest mass murder in Detroit's history occurred, known as the Hazelwood massacre. Eight African-Americans were shot and killed in a house in the Virginia Park Historic District.

The number of Detroit homicides peaked in 1974 at 714 and again in 1991 with 615. At the end of 2010, the homicide count fell to 308 for the year with an estimated population of just over 700,000, the lowest count and rate since 1967.

In 2006, the Detroit Police Department's Crime Analysis Unit reported that crimes dropped by 24 percent since the introduction of casino gaming to Detroit, Michigan.

In a 2007 analysis, Detroit officials noted that about 65 to 70 percent of homicides in the city were confined to a narcotics catalyst. In 2013, Detroit's number of criminal homicides was 333, a reduction of 14% compared to 2012. However, taken in context by population, Detroit remains a city with one of the highest homicide rates per capita in the United States.

In April 2008, Detroit unveiled a $300-million stimulus plan to create jobs and revitalize neighborhoods, financed by city bonds and paid for by earmarking about 15% of the wagering tax. Detroit's plans for revitalization include 7-Mile/Livernois, Brightmoor, East English Village, Grand River/Greenfield, North-End, and Osborn. Private organizations have pledged substantial funding to neighborhood revitalization efforts. One of the issues that is not as extreme as murders and crime, but shows system-wide decline of basic city services is a large number of stray dogs roaming the streets. Fifty-nine Detroit postal workers were attacked by stray dogs in 2010, according to a Detroit postmaster.

Detroit had faced many cases of arson each year on Devil's Night, the evening before Halloween. In the 1980s a number of residents noted that they had turned to arson of abandoned homes to keep drug dealers from using the empty buildings. The majority of citizen arsonists were never prosecuted or charged. The Angel's Night campaign, launched in the late 1990s, draws many volunteers to patrol the streets during Halloween week. The effort reduced arson: there were 810 fires set in 1984, this was reduced to 142 in 1996. In recent years, fires on this three-night period have dropped even further. In 2009, the Detroit Fire Department reported 119 fires over this period, of which 91 were classified as suspected arsons.

"Renaissance" has been Detroit's phrase for development since the 1970s. During the administration of Dennis Archer, who succeeded Coleman Young in 1994, Detroit saw middle-class residents moving into the city, and growth in residential and commercial development, despite overall population decline. Detroit has improved in the early 21st century, making use of increased funding from the state to demolish condemned buildings.

In 2012, the murder count had rebounded to 411, with 386 considered criminal homicides.

According to arrest records, as of 2015 many of the customers of illegal drugs and sex in Detroit originate from the suburbs. George Hunter of The Detroit News wrote that "Detroit's underground economy mirrors the legitimate one: Both rely heavily on suburban investment." The largest number of suburbanites committing illegal acts go to areas of Detroit bordering suburbs.

As of 2015, there is an element in Detroit culture against "snitching" or reporting criminal activity.

On August 29, 2022, a 19-year-old male was suspected of opening fire on random pedestrians in Detroit, killing three people and wounding a fourth; a dog was also killed. He was arrested later in the day, and formally charged with murder and attempted murder.

== Law and government ==
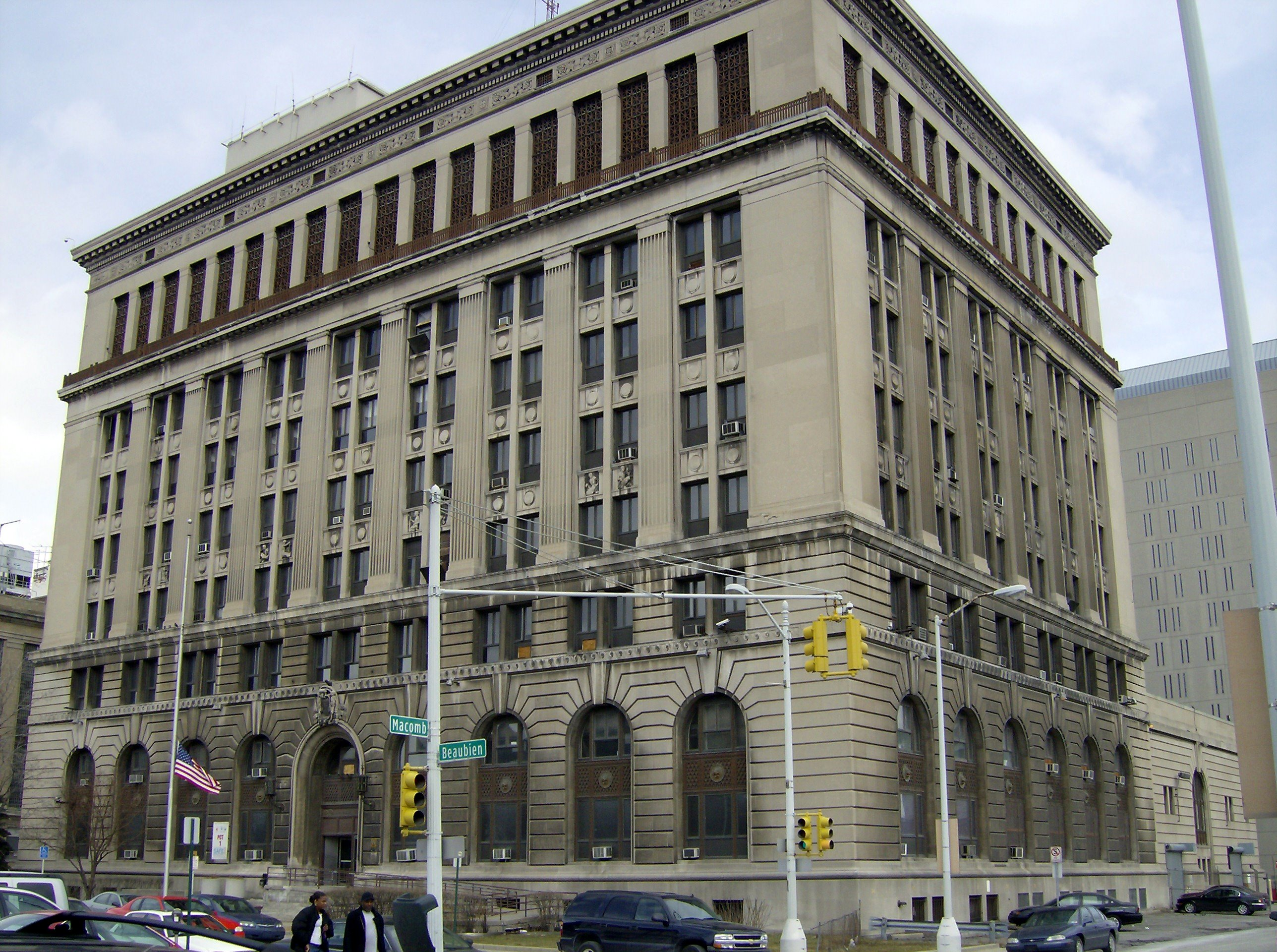
The former Detroit Police Headquarters at 1300 Beaubien.

In 2000, the city requested an investigation by the United States Justice Department into the Detroit Police Department which was concluded in 2003, following allegations regarding its use of force and civil rights violations. From 2005 to 2006, the city proceeded with a large scale reorganization of the Detroit Police Department, reducing the number of precincts from twelve to six districts. The stated purpose of this reorganization was to improve services.

The reorganization and the city's search for a new police headquarters raised concerns within the Detroit Police Department which included overcrowding issues and increased response times. Michigan and Detroit economic squeezes sustained re-organizational impetus. Then Police Chief Ella Bully-Cummings (now retired) reassigned sworn officers from desks to squad cars, consolidating and reducing the number of precincts.

In 2007, Detroit was named the most dangerous city in the US by a Morgan Quitno report published by CQ Press. The report was denounced by the American Society of Criminology as an "irresponsible misuse" of crime data. The U.S Conference of Mayors and the FBI have cautioned against using the Morgan Quitno – CQ Press report ranking cities as 'safest' or 'most dangerous'.

== Homicides per year ==
Year	Murders
1985	636
1986	648
1987	686
1988	629
1989	624
1990	582
1991	615
1992	595
1993	579
1994	541
1995	475
1996	428
1997	469
1998	430
1999	415
2000	396
2001	395
2002	402
2003	366

Year	Murders
2004	385
2005	356
2006	421
2007	392
2008	323
2009	363
2010	310
2011	344
2012	386
2013	316
2014	298
2015	295
2016	303
2017	267
2018	261
2019	272
2020	327
2021	309
2022	309

Year	Murders
2023	252
2024	203
2025	165

== Works ==
- Murder City: Detroit - 100 Years of Crime and Violence, 2008

== See also ==
- Crime in Michigan
- Law of Michigan
- Decline of Detroit
- History of Detroit
- Detroit riots including the 1967 Detroit riot
- List of United States cities by crime rate
