= Hazelwood massacre =

1971 murder of eight in Detroit

- A crime scene drawing by Dick Mayer, Detroit Free Press
- Location: 42.3745°N 83.0999°W; 1970 Hazelwood Street, Detroit, Michigan, United States
- Date: June 14, 1971; 55 years ago
- Attack type: Mass shooting
- Weapon: Firearms
- Deaths: 8
- Victims: Robert Gardner, Katherine Louise Winston, Narcissa Lee Brown, Katherine Betty Basser, Sharon Brown, Romandel Burton, Carl Carrington Mounts Jr., Lloyd Kenneth Tyler
- Perpetrator: Unknown

The Hazelwood massacre was a mass murder that occurred on June 14, 1971, in which eight people were shot and killed in a house on Hazelwood Street in Detroit, Michigan. It is the largest mass murder in Detroit's history.

Police believed that one of the victims, heroin dealer and pimp Robert Gardner, was the target and that the others were killed to avoid leaving witnesses. Police further believed that Gardner had robbed two Toronto drug dealers while they were visiting Detroit in March 1971 and that the Toronto dealers took out a hit on Gardner in revenge. It remains officially unsolved.

== Crime ==
On June 14, 1971, shortly before 4:30 a.m., eight persons were shot in the living room of an apartment at a red-brick house located at 1970 Hazelwood Street in Detroit. Seven of the victims died immediately. The massacre occurred near 12th Street, the focal point of the 1967 Detroit riot.

Police received calls from neighbors who heard the shots. They also received a call from the wife of Robert Gardner, who reported that she entered the house, found her husband had been shot, and drove him to Henry Ford Hospital. She reported, "There's a bloodbath in that house and you better send some police."

The seven victims who died at the scene were:

1. Katherine Louise Winston, age 19, of 2482 Hazelwood St. Detroit
2. Narcissa Lee "Tessie" Brown, age 19, of 2242 Hazelwood St., Detroit
3. Katherine Betty Basser, age 22, also known as Katherine Vassar and Shelia Williams, of 1600 Seward, Detroit
4. Sharon Brown, age 20, also known as Jacquelynn Foster and Linda Johnson, of 5618 14th Street, Detroit
5. Romandel Burton, age 24, of 69 Portage, Highland Park, and a security guard at Tiger Stadium
6. Carl Carrington Mounts Jr., age 27, also known as Robert Lee Gough, of 2708 West Grand Boulevard, Detroit
7. Lloyd "Taboo" Tyler, 27, of 1975 Webb, Detroit

All seven were shot in the head at close range; cartridges were recovered from guns with three different calibers. Analysis of the cartridges identified the murder weapons as a .30-caliber carbine, a .32-caliber semi-automatic pistol, and a .45-caliber semi-automatic pistol.

Three of the women had their hands tied in front with rubber surgical tubing, and one of the women had her arms wrapped around another's waist. All of the bodies were found in the living room. Two of the men appeared to have been sitting on the floor, and their heads fell into the fireplace after being shot. Another was leaning against the couch. Three of the women were on the couch, and the fourth woman was near the couch.

The eighth victim, Robert Gardner, was shot in the mouth, chest and stomach. He fell approximately 10 ft (3.0 m) from the front door. Police theorized that he answered the door and was shot as he backed away from the shooters. Gardner was taken to Henry Ford Hospital where he died from his wounds six days later, on June 20. All eight victims were African-American.

Three other occupants of the apartment, two women and one man, escaped by breaking through the rear window of a sun porch and fleeing down an alley. They came to police headquarters afterward. The killings became commonly known as the "Hazelwood massacre".

== Investigation ==
=== Immediate findings and theories ===
Four men were seen fleeing the house; witnesses described them as wearing windbreakers and tam o' shanter hats. Inside, police found 11 guns (five handguns, five long guns, and a shotgun), none of which had been fired recently. Subsequent analysis confirmed that the guns in the house were not used in the massacre.

Police also found packets of a substance believed to be heroin, as well as paraphernalia, including spoons, tin foil, and hypodermic needles. A total of $673 ($5,400 in 2022 dollars) in cash was found on the victims, including five $100 bills.

Vera Gibson, who lived with her husband and children in the apartment directly above the murder scene, said she woke to the sound of breaking glass, presumed to be the sound of the three survivors breaking the sun porch window, and then heard several gunshots a few minutes later. Gibson then heard Mrs. Gardner run upstairs, reporting that her husband had been shot, and asking to use the phone. However, the Gibsons had no telephone. Gibson described the Gardners as a "pleasant couple" who had moved in recently. Neighbors reported that young people had recently been seen going in and out of the house, during the night.

A team of 20 detectives, led by homicide inspector James Bannon, was assigned to the investigation. Inspector Bannon described the apartment as a suspected narcotics den. He said that four of the seven killed had criminal records for narcotics and prostitution. One of the victims, Lloyd Tyler, had multiple felony convictions, including a 1968 robbery of a jewelry store that ended in a shootout with police. He was a heroin addict who had been ordered to enter a federal narcotics treatment center in Kentucky as a condition of probation, but it rejected him due to his "anti-social behavior".

Bannon called it "an execution-type slaying". He added that they were mystified at the "sedentary", even placid, positions of the seven bodies, noting that one man was found with a cigarette in his hand and dollar bills on his lap.

In the days immediately following the shooting, police rejected the notion that the massacre was a robbery, as the perpetrators left both money and drugs untouched at the scene. Instead, police theorized that someone who had been sold fake heroin by Gardner returned for revenge and that the other seven victims were in the wrong place at the wrong time. The revenge theory was supported by the discovery in the apartment of a quantity of a substance that was initially thought to be heroin but which proved to be milk sugar and quinine. They later began pursuing leads indicating that Gardner may have robbed other drug dealers.

=== Shooting of Gerald Williams ===
Police later opined that Gardner was the target of the attack. Police described the other victims as Gardner's associates, three dealers and four prostitutes, who were killed in order to eliminate them as witnesses. Police described Gardner and another individual, Gerald Williams, as "middle-rank heroin dealers". Based on its investigation, the Detroit Free Press reported that Gardner was both a heroin dealer and a pimp.

Four days after the Hazelwood massacre, Williams was shot six times and killed at a motel on the west side of Detroit. Police believed that Williams had set up Gardner, telling the gunmen where to find him. Police suspected that Williams may even have been in the apartment on Hazelwood at the time of the massacre and that he was subsequently killed to eliminate him as a witness.

=== Toronto connection ===
A few days into the investigation, police began following a lead tying the massacre to Toronto, Ontario, Canada. A team of homicide detectives was sent there.

Sources informed the Detroit Free Press in late June that Williams was supplying heroin to dealers in Toronto, but the Toronto dealers were angry that Williams was diluting the heroin. Gardner then took over supplying the Canadians, but he was also suspected of diluting the product.

Unhappy with the diluted heroin being supplied by Williams and Gardner, the Toronto dealers in March had traveled with a representative to Detroit to search for a new source of supply. Gardner learned of the plan and kidnapped the representative from a taxi cab. Gardner then used the man to gain access to a motel room where the two Toronto dealers were staying. Gardner and an accomplice reportedly then robbed the dealers, getting away with approximately $13,000 in cash, $4,000 in jewelry, and $3,000 to $4,000 in cocaine. Rather than killing them, Gardner then released the dealers and their agent.

In retaliation, the Toronto dealers reportedly hired gunmen to kill Gardner. Gardner got wind of the planned hit and moved from his apartment at 2635 Cortland to a house at 95 Portage in Highland Park. The Highland Park location was reportedly used by two of the other victims (Lloyd Tyler and Romandel Burton) to sell heroin for Gardner. Seeking to remain on the move, Gardner relocated to the apartment on Hazelwood. He had also traveled to New York City, but was reportedly lured back to Detroit by a phone call from Williams advising Gardner of a potentially profitable drug deal.

== Aftermath ==
At the time it occurred, the Hazelwood massacre was "the biggest mass slaying in Detroit's history". It was part of a record year for murders in Detroit, many tied to drug wars, with the final death toll for 1971 reaching 690. During the 1970s, Detroit led the nation in homicides and became known as "Murder City".

As of 2001, the Hazelwood massacre remained the worst mass killing in Detroit's history. In 1990, five people were fatally shot, and another critically injured, at a reputed crack house in northeast Detroit. It was the worst mass murder in Detroit since the Hazelwood massacre.

No one has ever been arrested, and the case remains open.

== See also ==
- List of homicides in Michigan
- Crime in Detroit
- List of unsolved murders (1900–1979)
