= Premier Financial =

Premier Financial Corp.
- Formerly: First Defiance Financial Corp.
- Company type: Public
- Traded as: Nasdaq: PFC
- Industry: Banking
- Founded: 1920; 106 years ago
- Headquarters: Defiance, Ohio
- Area served: Ohio, Michigan, Indiana, West Virginia, Pennsylvania
- Key people: Gary M. Small (president & CEO); Donald P. Hileman (executive chairman); Paul D. Nungester, (CFO)
- Revenue: ▲$0.148 billion (2017)
- Net income: ▲$0.032 billion (2017)
- Total assets: ▲$2.993 billion (2017)
- Total equity: ▲$0.373 billion (2017)
- Number of employees: 674 (2017)
- Website: yourpremierbank.com

Premier Financial Corp., headquartered in Defiance, Ohio, is the holding company for Premier Bank. Premier Bank, headquartered in Youngstown, Ohio, operates 73 branches and 9 loan offices in Ohio, Michigan, Indiana and Pennsylvania.

== History ==
The bank was established in 1889 as FIRST FEDERAL SAVINGS AND LOAN ASSOCIATION OF DEFIANCE.

In 2000, the name of the bank was changed to First Federal Bank of the Midwest.

In March 2008, the company acquired Pavilion Bancorp Inc. and its subsidiary, the Bank of Lenawee.

In 2012, the company repurchased the stock issued to the United States Department of the Treasury in connection with its investment in the company via the Troubled Asset Relief Program and in 2015 the company repurchased the warrants issued to the Treasury.

In February 2014, the company announced a merger with First Community Bank and entered the Columbus, Ohio market. However, in April 2014, the merger agreement was terminated.

In February 2017, the company acquired Commercial Bancshares, Inc. and The Commercial Savings Bank for $70.3 million.

In January 2020, the holding company for First Federal Bank of the Midwest merged with United Community Financial Corp. In April 2020, the new company announced the unification of their banking businesses under the new name of Premier Bank.

In July 2024, the company announced its intention to merge with WesBanco in an all stock deal valued at $959 million.
