= Murder City: Detroit - 100 Years of Crime and Violence =

American film

- Directed by: Alan Bradley
- Produced by: Ben Scott; P. Red; Al Profit
- Starring: Seven the General; Ziploc Moe; Motsi Ski; Roy Houston
- Cinematography: Alan Bradley
- Edited by: B.Marable
- Music by: Seven the General, Motsi Ski
- Distributed by: Long Range Distribution
- Release date: 2008
- Running time: 82 minutes
- Country: United States
- Language: English

Murder City: Detroit - 100 Years of Crime and Violence is a 2008 film which chronicles the story of gang violence in Detroit over the past 100 years and how it has affected the fabric of one of the oldest cities in the midwest. Murder City is filmed documentary style and chronicles the cities notorious criminal past.

The stories of Detroit's notorious criminals are interspersed with real life drug stories in the film. Detroit legendary music artist Seven the General stars in the film and sheds light his history and ties with Young Boys Inc. Along with retired police officers, and "others tell their crime stories on film. They chronicle losing loved ones to violence, as well as their own experiences. The real life stories add a humanizing element."

Released nationally and directed by Alan "Al Profit" Bradley the film is stored in collegiate libraries and used by professors at the University of Michigan and Michigan State University as a reference tool for class course work.

== Cast ==
- "Seven the General"
- "Ziploc Moe
- "Motsi Ski
- "Alex Thomas"
- "Roy Houston"
- "Manno"
- "Everett Taylor"
- "Ice"
- "Fred Rocquemore"
- "Paul Howard"

== See also ==
- Crime in Detroit
