= Sidney Fine (historian) =

American historian (1920–2009)

Sidney Fine (October 11, 1920 – March 31, 2009) was a professor of history at the University of Michigan. He authored books on Frank Murphy, who served successively as Mayor of Detroit, Governor of Michigan, United States Attorney General, and Associate Justice of the United States Supreme Court. Fine was a Guggenheim Fellow and twice the winner of the University of Michigan Press Award. He received the University of Michigan's Distinguished Faculty Achievement Award in 1969.

== Biography ==
Sidney Fine was born in Cleveland, Ohio on October 11, 1920. He was awarded his B.A. from Western Reserve University in 1942, served in the Navy, serving as a Japanese Language Officer from 1942 to 1946, and earned both an M.A. (1944) and Ph.D. (1948) in history from the University of Michigan. Fine was a specialist in modern American history, with interest in the history of the labor movement, the New Deal, and the history of Michigan and its political environment. He wrote and edited over fifteen books and many articles.

Fine's first appointment at the University of Michigan was as a teaching assistant in 1946. He accepted a position as a UM instructor in 1948 and was appointed as an assistant professor, an associate professor, then a full professor in 1959 in the History Department. Dr. Fine acted as advisor to masters and doctoral students, served on many doctoral committees, and was chairman of the department from 1969 to 1971. He was named the Richard Hudson Research Professor of History, the Andrew Dickson White Distinguished Professor of History, the Henry Russel Lecturer, and was named the "Professor of the Year" for the state of Michigan in 1986. He is the only member of the UM faculty to have been designated as the Henry Russel Lecturer, as well as being honored by the undergraduates with the Golden Apple Award for outstanding university teaching (in 1993).

Fine's continued presence was a significant factor in getting the Michigan legislature to repeal mandatory retirement at age 70 for university professors. He retired from UM in the spring of 2001. Fine was active in the University of Michigan community, serving on numerous committees in the College of Literature, Science & the Arts (LSA) and the general university community. He was the adviser for student associations and served on the executive and advisory committees of the UM libraries. Fine also served on the Archives Advisory Council and the Public Documents Commission. He also consulted on several UM-related and private projects such as the Ford Corporate History Project, the UAW Oral History Project, and television series on labor history.

== Selected publications ==
- Laissez Faire and the General-Welfare State a Study, (Ann Arbor Paperbacks, The University of Michigan Press, 1956) ISBN 0-472-06086-4
- "Frank Murphy in World War I". The Michigan Historical Collections and Bentley Library Bulletin, Number 17 (Ann Arbor: Michigan Historical Collections, 1968) Photos, 44 pp.
- Sit-down: The General Motors Strike of 1936-1937. (Ann Arbor: University of Michigan Press, 1969). ISBN 978-0-472-32948-9; ISBN 0-472-32948-0; ISBN 0-395-11778-X.
- Frank Murphy: The Detroit Years. (Ann Arbor: University of Michigan Press, 1975) 618 pages. ISBN 0-472-32949-9.
- Frank Murphy: The New Deal Years. (Chicago: University of Chicago Press, 1979) ISBN 0-226-24934-4; ISBN 978-0-226-24934-6; ISBN 0-226-65871-6.
- Frank Murphy. Volume 3, The Washington Years (Ann Arbor: University of Michigan Press, 1984) ISBN 0-472-10046-7.
- Violence in the Model City: The Cavanagh Administration, Race Relations, and the Detroit Riot of 1967 (Ann Arbor: University of Michigan Press, 1989).
