= Livernois–Fenkell riot =

Racially motivated riot in Detroit, Michigan, US

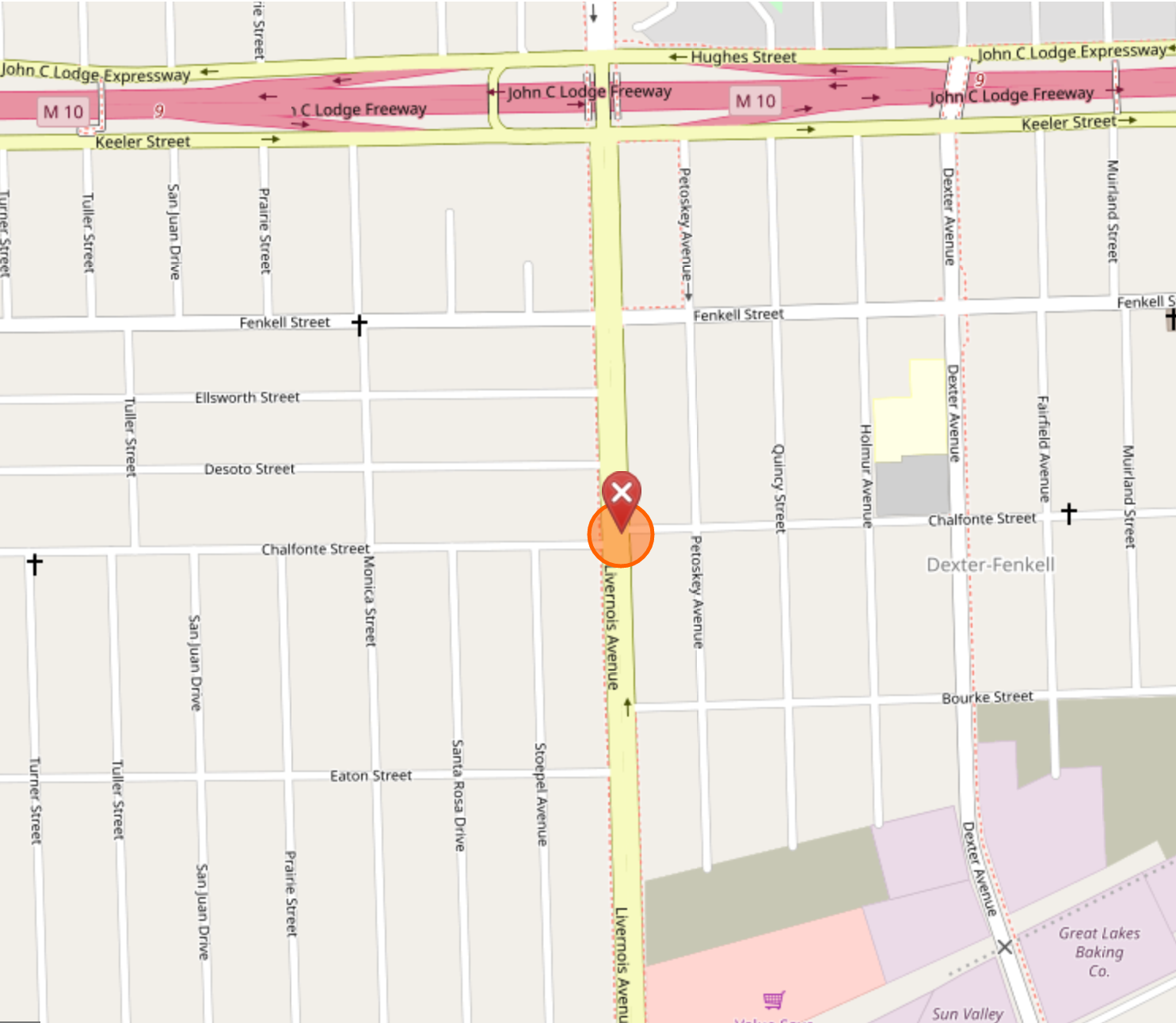
- Map of the riot location
- Date: July 28–29, 1975
- Location: Livernois Avenue at Chalfonte Avenue, just south of Fenkell Avenue, in Detroit, Michigan
- Deaths: Obie Wynn; Marian Pyszko
- Injuries: 10 injuries

The Livernois–Fenkell riot was a racially motivated riot that occurred in July 1975 on Livernois Avenue at Chalfonte Avenue, just south of Fenkell Avenue, in Detroit, Michigan.

A White American bar owner shot a Black American teenager who was seen tampering with the bar owner's car. The gunman reportedly thought that the teenager's screwdriver was a weapon. Following the teenager's death, gathered crowds reacted with random acts of vandalism, assault, looting and racial fighting. A Nazi concentration camp survivor in his mid-50s was beaten to death by a group of black youths. There were no other deaths.

== Fatal shooting of an 18-year-old ==
The trouble began on the evening of July 28, when Andrew Chinarian, the 39-year-old white owner of Bolton's Bar, observed three black youths tampering with his car in the parking lot. He fired a pistol or rifle, fatally wounding 18-year-old Obie Wynn. According to some accounts, Wynn was fleeing; according to others, he was approaching Chinarian with what the latter thought was a weapon, it later emerged that Wynn was holding a screwdriver. He died from a gunshot wound to the back of the head. Crowds gathered and random acts of vandalism, assault, looting and racial fighting along Livernois and Fenkell avenues ensued. Bottles and rocks were thrown at passing cars.

== Beating to death a concentration camp survivor ==
The second man killed was Marian Pyszko, a 54-year-old dishwasher and Nazi concentration camp survivor who had emigrated from Poland in 1958. As he drove home from the bakery/candy factory where he worked, he was pulled from his car by a group of black youths and beaten to death with a piece of concrete. Ronald Bell Jordan, Raymond Peoples, and Dennis Lindsay were all charged with first degree murder, but acquitted. Several years later, Peoples returned to headlines after being arrested for dealing heroin. In 1983, he was sentenced to three years and eight months in federal prison for heroin dealing.

== Police avoiding the use of deadly force ==
Police were ordered to not use deadly force, so no shots were fired. A crowd of 700 was dispersed by morning. Angry crowds reappeared and violence resumed the following night – a car became a battering ram and a mob ransacked Bolton's Bar.

== Intervention by the mayor ==
Detroit mayor Coleman Young defused the disturbance by appearing in person (along with several clergymen) and ordering every black policeman in the city to police the riot.

== Property damage ==
The damage to property in the Livernois-Fenkell area amounted to tens of thousands of dollars. Fifty-three people were arrested, and ten injuries were recorded (including one firefighter and one police officer).

== CBS News reports about discriminatory hiring practices ==
CBS News reported an unverified claim that the bar served white patrons only, and noted the 25% unemployment rate as an aggravating factor.

== See also ==
- List of riots in Detroit
- List of homicides in Michigan
- List of incidents of civil unrest in the United States

== Bibliography ==
Notes

References

- Buchanan, Heather; Stanford, Sharon; Kimble, Teresa (2007). Eyes on Fire: Witnesses to the Detroit Riot of 1967. Aquarius Press. ISBN 9780971821453. - Total pages: 80
- CBS News (July 29, 1975). "CBS Evening News for Tuesday, July 29, 1975". Vanderbilt Television News Archive.
- Darden, Joe T.; Thomas, Richard W. (2013). Detroit: Race Riots, Racial Conflicts, and Efforts to Bridge the Racial Divide. Michigan State University Press. ISBN 9781609173524. - Total pages: 325 - Article on book: Detroit: Race Riots, Racial Conflicts, and Efforts to Bridge the Racial Divide
- Jet Magazine (August 14, 1975). "Violence erupts in Detroit". Jet Magazine. XLVIII (21). Johnson Publishing Company: 6–7. OCLC 20729894.
- Salpukas, Agis (July 31, 1975a). "Detroit Authorities Move To Keep Unrest in Check". The New York Times. ISSN 1553-8095. OCLC 1645522.
- Salpukas, Agis (August 1, 1975b). "Symbols of Black Power". The New York Times. New York City. ISSN 1553-8095. OCLC 1645522.
- Streissguth, Thomas (2009). Hate Crimes. Infobase Publishing. ISBN 9781438119045. - Total pages: 337
- "The Nation: Close to the Brink". Time. August 11, 1975.
