= Livernois Avenue =

Thoroughfare in Detroit, Michigan, U.S.

- Length: 29.23 mi (47.04 km)
- South end: Jefferson Avenue in Detroit
- Major junctions: M-85 / M-5 / M-8 / M-10 in Detroit; I-75 / I-94 / I-96 in Detroit; US 12 in Detroit; M-102 in Detroit–Ferndale; M-1 in Pleasant Ridge; I-696 in Pleasant Ridge–Royal Oak; M-59 in Rochester Hills (no interchange)
- North end: Orion Road near Goodison

Livernois Avenue (/ˈlɪvərnɔɪ/; also referred to as Livernois Road, Livernois Street, Avenue of Fashion, and Main Street) is a major thoroughfare and section line road on the west side of Metro Detroit in the US state of Michigan.

== Route description ==
=== Within Detroit ===
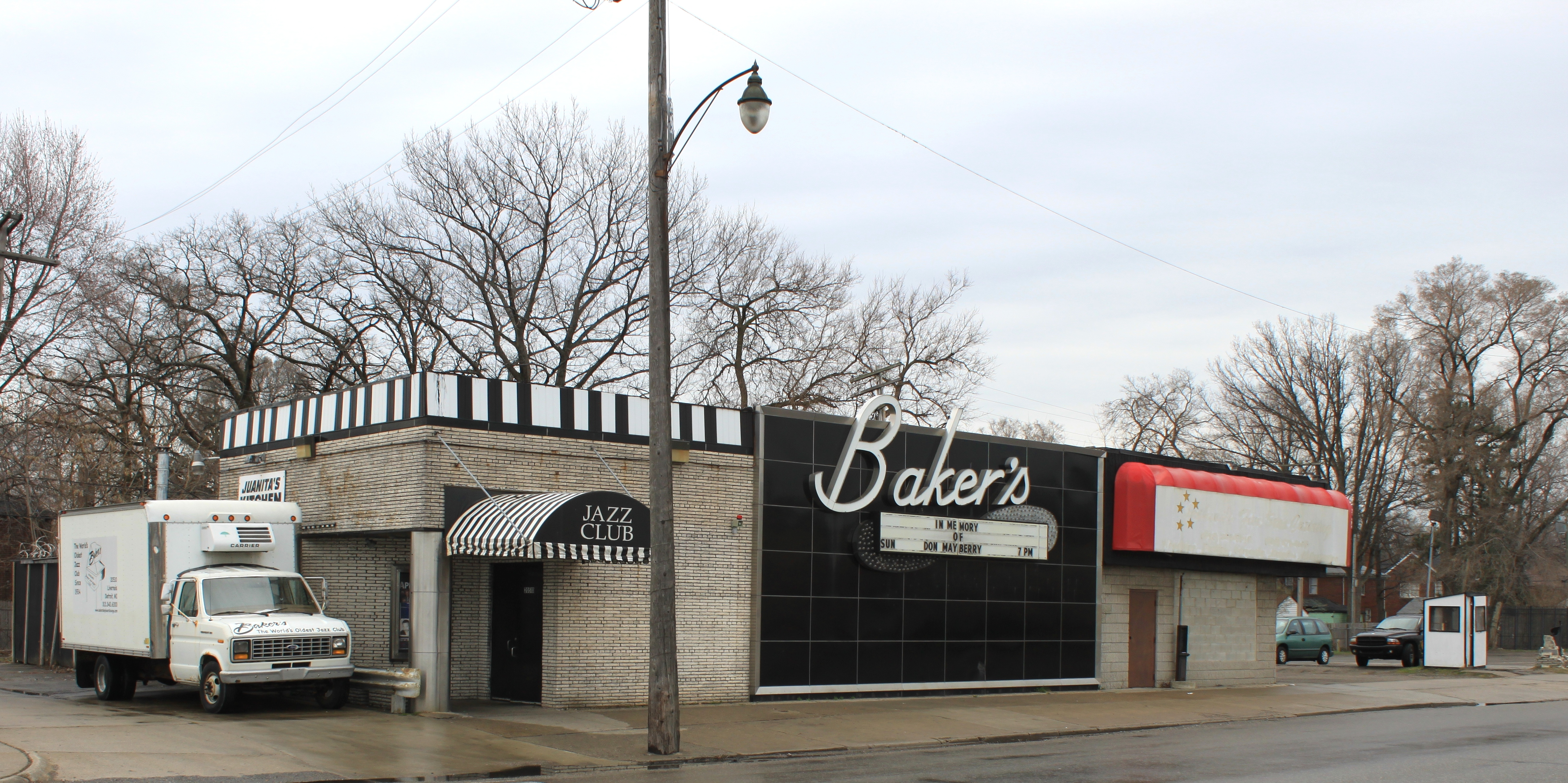
Baker's Keyboard Lounge on Livernois near Eight Mile Road

Livernois Avenue starts out in southwest Detroit across Jefferson Avenue from Fort Wayne, carrying only southbound traffic, with northbound traffic carried on Dragoon Street one block east. Both roads converge together a block north of Vernor Highway, from this point northward, Livernois carries traffic in both directions. At Alaska Street (between Tireman Street and Joy Road), it turns from north-northwestward to due north. Livernois Avenue then becomes a boulevard at M-5 (Grand River Avenue) and remains one as far north as Margareta Street, with only a brief interruption for two blocks between M-8 (Davison Street) and Grand Street. It is along this stretch that Livernois passes the western edge of the University of Detroit Mercy's main campus. At 7 Mile Road, Livernois becomes the "Avenue of Fashion," and intersects the eastern end of West Outer Drive.

=== Within Oakland County ===
Livernois Avenue becomes less prominent as it crosses M-102 (8 Mile Road) into Ferndale, but is still lined with commercial businesses. Livernois then becomes a divided highway again at Marshall Street (between 8 and 9 Mile) and continues to be one until its first physical interruption at 9 Mile Road for a supermarket parking lot. Livernois then starts up again, still a divided roadway and as a residential street, one block north and continues until it is interrupted again just south of the Ferndale city limits at Oakridge Avenue.

Livernois Avenue then picks up as an undivided commercial road again at M-1 (Woodward Avenue) in Pleasant Ridge as Main Street and with only northbound traffic-it does not become a two-way street until the westbound Interstate 696 (I-696) service drive, two blocks north. It retains the Main Street name through the cities of Royal Oak and Clawson before becoming Livernois again upon completely entering Troy at Maple (15 Mile) Road. Livernois then passes under I-75 without an interchange and then crosses Big Beaver Road a couple blocks north.

Livernois Avenue continues northward into Rochester Hills, where it crosses over M-59, again without an interchange. Several miles to the north after a roundabout at Tienken Road, Livernois becomes a residential dirt road. After a staggered junction at Dutton Road which crosses Paint Creek, Livernois ends at Orion Road in southern Oakland Township.

== Name ==
Livernois Avenue was named after Francois Livernois, a French farmer who resided in the area during the 18th century. Although in official French pronunciation, it is "Livern-wa", the locals pronounce it "Liver-noy".

== History ==
Between 7 and 8 Mile roads, Livernois is called the "Avenue of Fashion". This section of Livernois was a major retail destination in Detroit up till the 1950s when new suburban malls pulled away shoppers.

In 1970, the road was reconstructed to serve the service roads of interstate 75.

Livernois Avenue was the site of the 1975 Livernois-Fenkell riot when the white owner of a bar located on the road near Fenkell Street in Detroit shot and killed a black man as he was attempting a carjacking.

In 2006, the portion between Grove Street (south of McNichols Road) and 7 Mile Road became the first stretch of Livernois Avenue in Detroit to be converted into a divided boulevard. The boulevard has since been extended both north to 8 Mile Road in 2007 and south to Grand River Avenue in the late 2000s.

The road north of Margareta Street was reconstructed in 2019 as part of a major road construction project.

On October 21, 2019, Livernois Avenue was vacated and permanently closed between Jefferson Avenue and South Street in the Delray neighborhood, to facilitate construction of the United States Port of Entry for the Gordie Howe International Bridge. The following year, on July 17, 2020, the portion north of South Street to the Norfolk Southern railroad was vacated and permanently closed as well, along with the entirety of Dragoon Street between Jefferson Avenue and Fort Street for the same purpose. Also on that same day, the now southernmost section of Livernois between Fort Street and the railroad was reconfigured to facilitate two-way traffic, and to provide a restricted contractor access point for the US POE construction activities beyond.

== Major junctions ==
County	Location	mi	km	Destinations	Notes
Wayne	Detroit			Jefferson Avenue	Former southern terminus
Wayne	Detroit	0.00	0.00	Cul-de-sac	Southern terminus
Wayne	Detroit			M-85 (Fort Street)	
Wayne	Detroit			I-75 (Fisher Freeway)	I-75 former exit 46
Wayne	Detroit			US 12	
Wayne	Detroit			I-94	I-94 exit 212A eastbound, 212 westbound
Wayne	Detroit			I-96	I-96 exit 188A westbound, 188 eastbound
Wayne	Detroit			M-5	
Wayne	Detroit			M-8	
Wayne	Detroit			M-10	M-10 exit 9
Wayne–Oakland county line	Detroit–Ferndale city line			M-102	
Oakland	Pleasant Ridge			M-1	
Oakland	Pleasant Ridge–Royal Oak city line			I-696	
Oakland	Rochester Hills			M-59	
Oakland	Goodison	29.23	47.04	Orion Road	Northern terminus
1.000 mi = 1.609 km; 1.000 km = 0.621 mi: Closed/former
