= New York race riots of 1919 =

New York riots of 1919
- Part of Red Summer
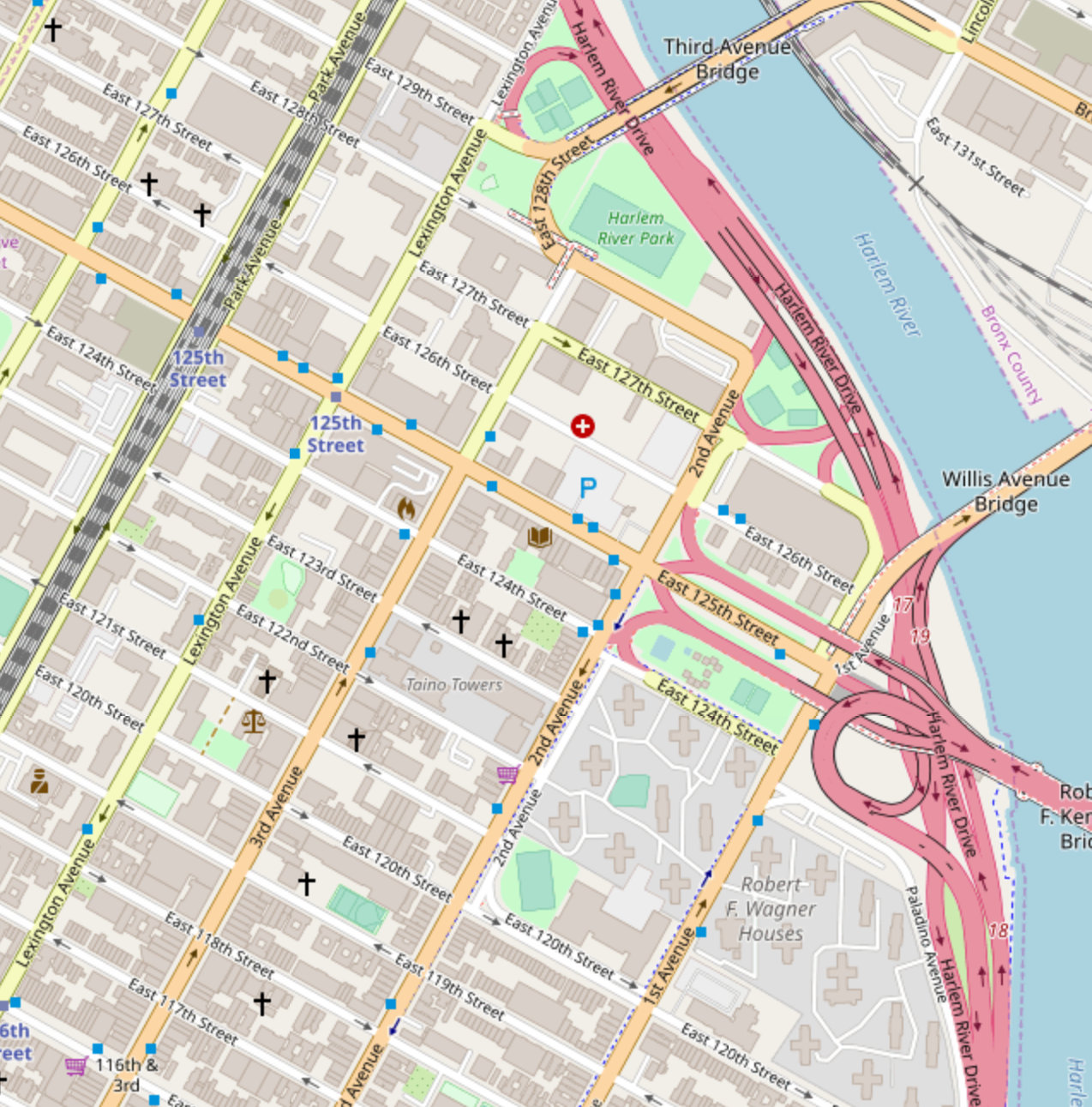
- Modern day map of 127th St between 2nd and 3rd Ave, New York
- Date: Summer of 1919
- Location: New York City, United States

The New York race riots of 1919 developed with increasing racial tension and violent incidents in New York City. These riots were a part of the Red Summer, a series of violent terrorist attacks on black communities in many cities in the United States during the summer and early autumn of 1919. The New York race riots were caused by social tensions such as competition for jobs, politics, and racial tension. Many historians and scholars view these riots as the culmination of racial tensions which had been rising due to the migration of African Americans from the rural South to northern cities. Tensions developed partly due to the competition for jobs, which was worsened by the presence of African American workers who could replace striking White workers.

== Background ==
Race tensions in New York had always been an issue. During the New York City draft riots of July 13–16, 1863, which were initially intended to express anger at the draft, the protests turned into a race riot, with White rioters, predominantly Irish immigrants, attacking African American people throughout the city. The official death toll was listed at 119 or 120 individuals. As more and more African-Americans moved from the south to the industrial north, they started to move into predominantly White neighborhoods.

== July ==
On July 20, 1919, a White man and an African American man were arguing about World War I. The fight got heated and the black man pulled a gun and shot wildly down the street. Some of the bullets hit civilians, with one striking George Doles of 231 East 127th St while he was in his ground-floor apartment. Another hit Henrietta Taylor, who was sitting on a stoop on 228 East 127th Street. While the two were rushed to a Harlem hospital, word spread that a riot was about to start, and when police arrived on the scene about a thousand black people were present on the block between 2nd and 3rd Ave. As police attempted to clear the streets they were fired upon from surrounding buildings.

On July 31, the Syracuse riot broke out upstate in Syracuse, New York.

== August ==
The Haynes' report, as summarized in the New York Times, lists a race riot as taking place on August 21.

== September ==
In September there was another race riot.

== Red Summer ==
This uprising was one of several incidents of civil unrest that began in the so-called American Red Summer of 1919. It consisted of terrorist attacks on black communities and white oppression in over three dozen cities and counties. In most cases, white mobs attacked African American neighborhoods. In some cases, black community groups resisted the attacks, especially in Chicago and Washington, D.C. Most deaths occurred in rural areas during events like the Elaine massacre in Arkansas, where an estimated 100 to 240 black people and 5 white people were killed. Also occurring in 1919 were the Chicago race riot and Washington D.C. race riot, which killed 38 and 39 people, respectively, and with both having many more non-fatal injuries and millions of dollars in property damage.

== See also ==
- Mass racial violence in the United States
- List of incidents of civil unrest in New York City
- List of incidents of civil unrest in the United States

== Bibliography ==
Notes

References

- Foner, Eric (2014). Reconstruction Updated Edition: America's Unfinished Revolution, 1863-1877. HarperCollins. ISBN 9780062354518. - Total pages: 752
- The New York Times (July 20, 1919). "War Talk Starts Riot In Harlem". The New York Times. New York, NY. ISSN 1553-8095. OCLC 1645522.
- The New York Times (October 5, 1919a). "For Action on Race Riot Peril". The New York Times. New York, NY. ISSN 1553-8095. OCLC 1645522.
- Rucker, Walter C.; Upton, James N. (2007). Encyclopedia of American Race Riots, Volume 2. Greenwood Publishing Group. ISBN 9780313333026. - Total pages: 930
- Voogd, Jan (2008). Race Riots and Resistance: The Red Summer of 1919. Peter Lang. ISBN 9781433100673. - Total pages: 234
