= 1919 Baltimore riots =

Series of riots connected to the Red Summer of 1919

Baltimore riots of 1919
- Part of Red Summer
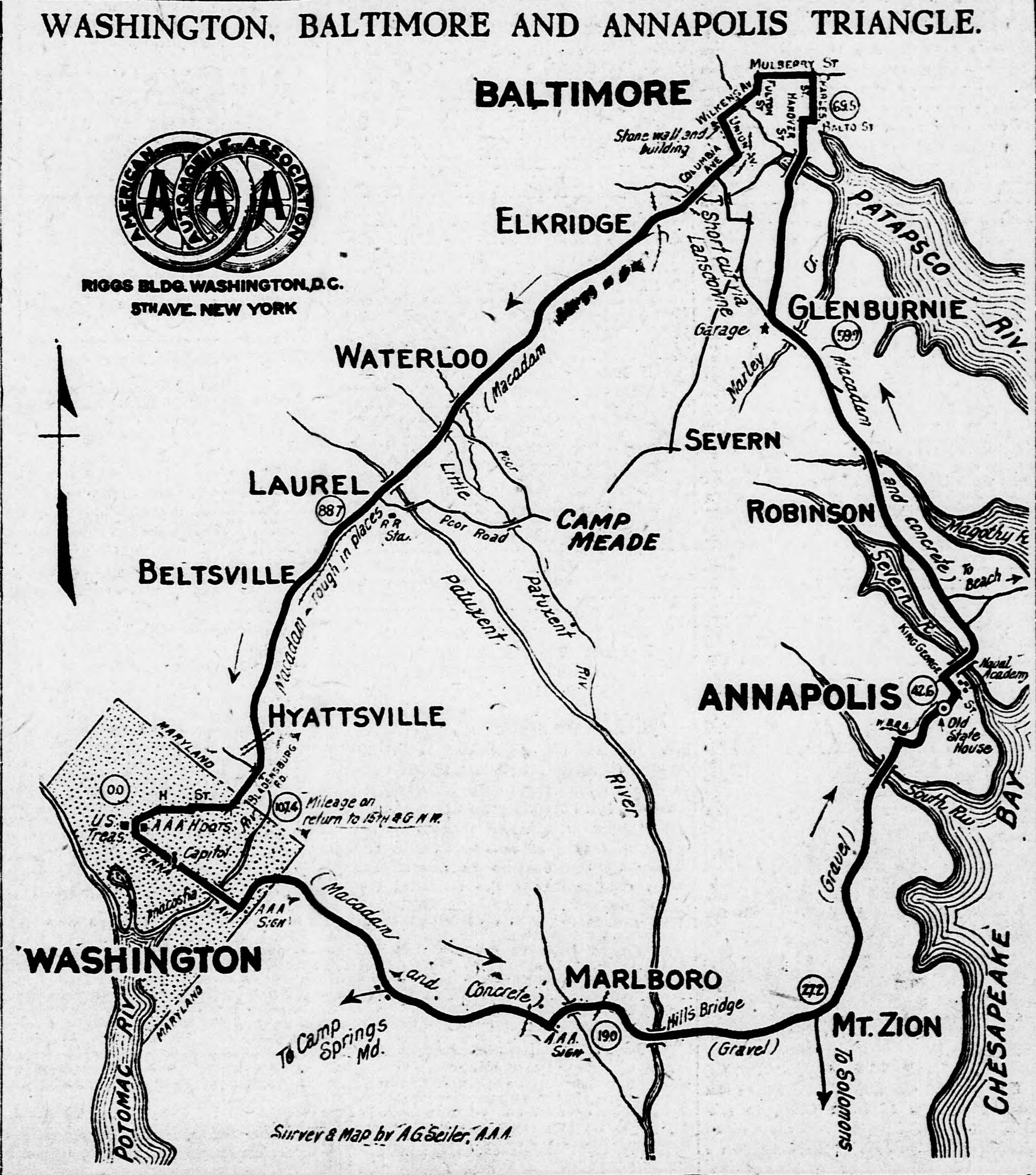
- Map of the Washington, Fort Meade, Baltimore and Annapolis
- Date: Summer of 1919
- Location: Baltimore, United States
- Participants: October Riot - Soldiers from Fort Meade fighting local Black community, Baltimore PD

The Baltimore riots of 1919 were a series of riots connected to the Red Summer of 1919. As more and more African-Americans moved from the south to the industrial north they started to move into predominantly white neighborhoods. This change in the racial demographics of urban areas increased racial tension that occasionally boiled over into civil unrest.

== July Riot ==
The Haynes' report, as summarized in the New York Times, lists a race riot as taking place on July 11.

== October Riot ==
Another Baltimore riot occurred between 11 PM October 1, 1919, until 2 AM October 2. It is at the end of the Red Summer riots of 1919. A small group of soldiers from Fort Meade (one paper says 4, another 7) were walking near Eastern avenue and Spring street when a bottle was thrown from a house hit one of them. "The doughboys began yelling at the negroes and daring them to leave their homes." There was fear that a riot would develop. Baltimore police were called and they forced the soldiers to leave the area.

An hour later they returned "with fifty or sixty more" and began shooting at any black person they encountered. When the police arrived, they shot at the soldiers. A riot call produced "two patrol loads" of police. Four soldiers were arrested and the others withdrew. They returned half an hour later in greater numbers and "charged along Eastern Avenue". They were met by the police "with heavy clubs". Two more soldiers were arrested, and order was restored.

The six men arrested were ordered to pay small fines by Magistrate Gerecht in Baltimore's Eastern Police Court.

== Aftermath ==
These confrontations were among numerous incidents of civil unrest that began in the so-called Red Summer of 1919. The Summer consisted of attacks on black communities in more than three dozen cities and counties. In most cases, white mobs attacked black neighborhoods. In some cases, black community groups resisted the attacks, especially in Chicago and Washington, D.C. Most deaths occurred in rural areas during events such as the Elaine massacre in Arkansas, where an estimated 100 to 240 black people and 5 white people were killed. Also occurring in 1919 was the Chicago Race Riot and Washington D.C. race riot which killed 38 and 39 people respectively, both having many more non-fatal injuries and extensive property damage.

== See also ==
- New London Naval riots of 1919
- Mass racial violence in the United States
- List of incidents of civil unrest in the United States

== Bibliography ==
Notes

References

- Baltimore Sun (October 3, 1919). "Soldiers and Negroes Clash". Baltimore Sun. Baltimore: A. S. Abell Company. ISSN 1930-8965. OCLC 244481759.
- The New York Times (October 5, 1919). "For Action on Race Riot Peril". The New York Times. New York, NY. ISSN 1553-8095. OCLC 1645522.
- Washington Post (October 3, 1919). "Camp Meade Men Attack Baltimore Negro Section". The Washington Post. ISSN 0190-8286. OCLC 2269358.
