= Charleston race massacre =

Charleston race massacre may refer to:

- Charleston riot of 1919, in which six African-Americans were killed by a White-American mob
- Charleston church shooting (2015), a mass shooting at a church in which nine African-Americans were killed and a tenth injured
