= Garfield Park riot of 1919 =

1919 race riot in Indianapolis, Indiana

- Part of Red Summer
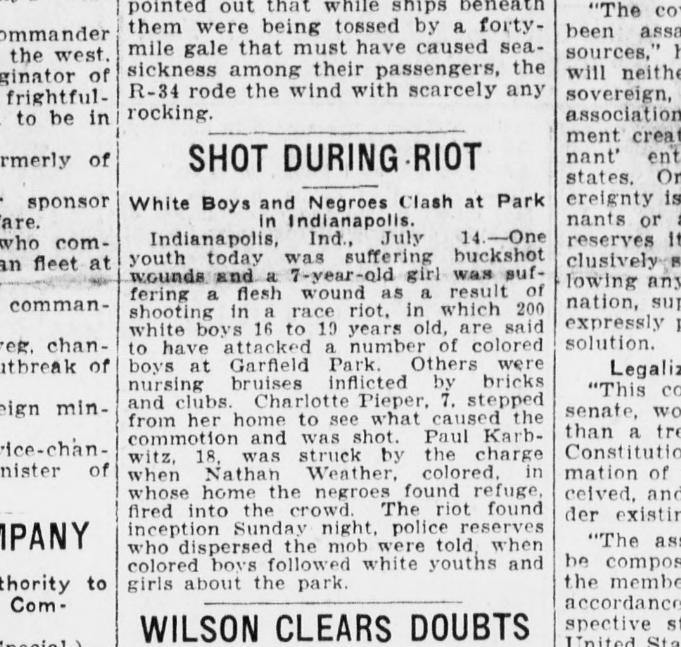
- US News coverage of the Garfield Park riot of 1919
- Date: July 1919
- Location: Garfield Park, Indianapolis, United States

The Garfield Park riot of 1919 was a race riot that began in Garfield Park in Indianapolis, Indiana on July 14, 1919. Multiple people, including a seven-year-old girl, were wounded when gunfire broke out.

== Riot in the park ==
Amidst racial tensions during the summer of 1919, a group of white youths in Indianapolis thought that they were being followed by groups of African-Americans. On July 14, 1919, hundreds of white boys 16 to 19 years old converged on Garfield Park. There they used bricks and clubs to beat any black people they came across. When a group of African-Americans took shelter in the house of Nathan Weather, a local black man, the white mob followed them and surrounded the house. Weather fired into the crowd in hopes of dispersing the mob. A seven-year-old onlooker, Charlotte Pieper, received a flesh wound from stray buckshot. Another youth, Paul Karbwitz, 18, was also hit. Police were eventually able to disperse the mob and quell the riot.

== Aftermath ==
This uprising was one of several incidents of civil unrest that began in the so-called American Red Summer of 1919. The Summer consisted of terrorist attacks on black communities, and white oppression in over three dozen cities and counties. In most cases, white mobs attacked African American neighborhoods. In some cases, black community groups resisted the attacks, especially in Chicago and Washington, D.C. Most deaths occurred in rural areas during events such as the Elaine massacre in Arkansas, where an estimated 100 to 240 black people and 5 white people were killed. Also occurring in 1919 were the Chicago Race Riot and the Washington D.C. race riot which killed 38 and 39 people, respectively, and with both having many more non-fatal injuries and extensive property damage reaching up into the millions of dollars.

== See also ==
- Washington race riot of 1919
- Mass racial violence in the United States
- List of incidents of civil unrest in the United States

== Bibliography ==
Notes

References

- The Chattanooga News (July 14, 1919). "Shot During Riot: White Boys and Negroes Clash at Park In Indianapolis". The Chattanooga News. Chattanooga & Hamilton, Tennessee: News Pub. Co. pp. 1–12. ISSN 2471-1977. OCLC 12703770.
- The New York Times (October 5, 1919). "For Action on Race Riot Peril". The New York Times. New York, NY. ISSN 1553-8095. OCLC 1645522.
