= Newberry 1919 lynching attempt =

- Part of Red Summer
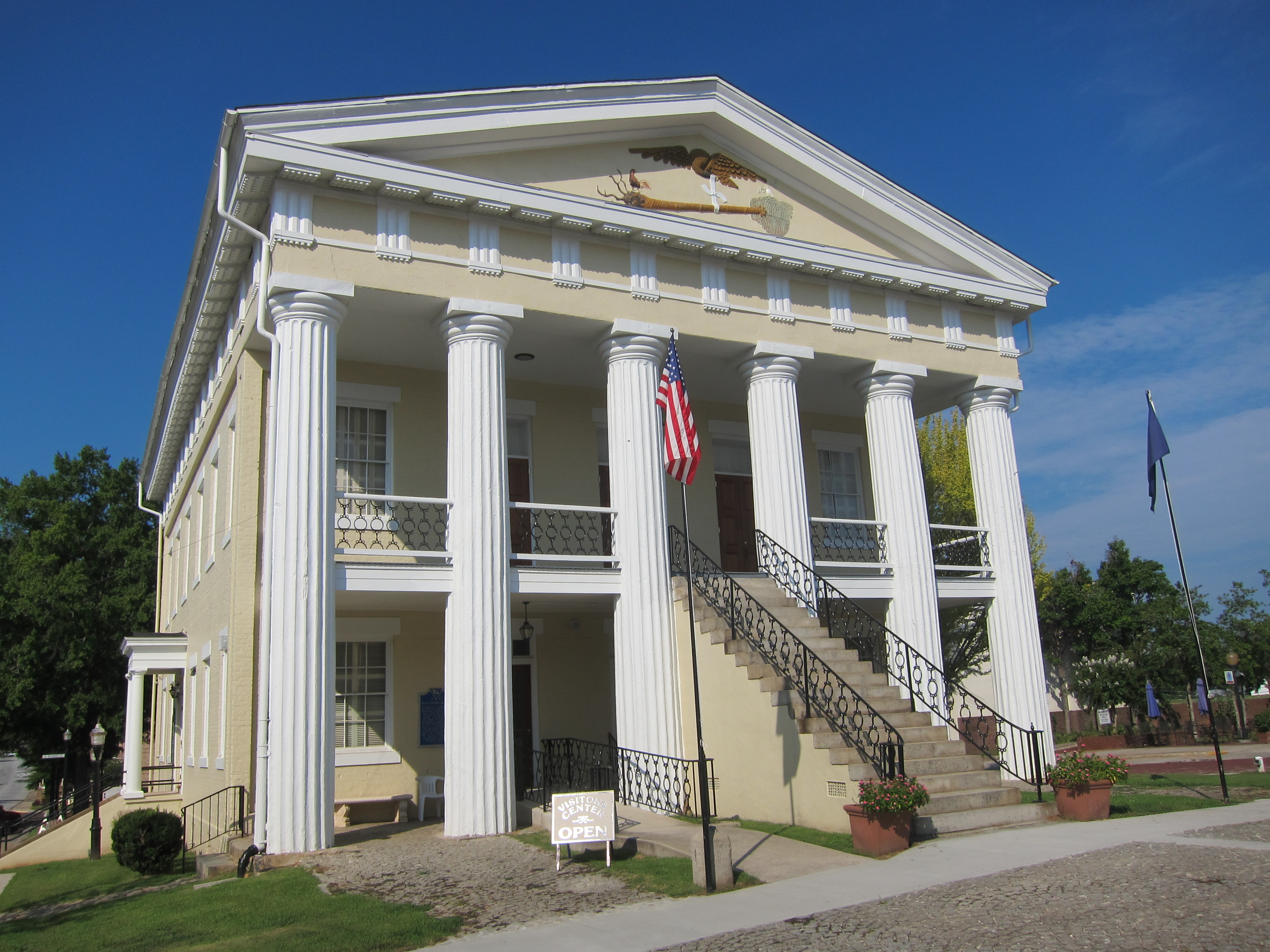
- Old Court House of Newberry, SC
- Date: July 24, 1919
- Location: Newberry, South Carolina, United States

The Newberry 1919 lynching attempt was the attempted lynching of Elisha Harper, Newberry, South Carolina on July 24, 1919. Harper was sent to jail for insulting a 14-year-old girl.

== Attempted lynching ==
Elisha Harper, 25 years old, was the son of the Rev. T. F. Harper, a respectable and "well-behaved preacher" living in Helena. He fought in the Army during World War I and just returned from Europe. On July 24, 1919, while walking the streets of Newberry, South Carolina he allegedly insulted a 14-year-old girl who promptly reported him to the authorities. He was arrested and thrown in jail. Soon a white mob had gathered and would have lynched Harper had Sheriff Blease not bundled and hid him away.

== Aftermath ==
This uprising was one of several incidents of civil unrest that began in the so-called American Red Summer, of 1919. The Summer consisted of terrorist attacks on black communities, and white oppression in over three dozen cities and counties. In most cases, white mobs attacked African American neighborhoods. In some cases, black community groups resisted the attacks, especially in Chicago and Washington, D.C. Most deaths occurred in rural areas during events like the Elaine massacre in Arkansas, where an estimated 100 to 240 black people and 5 white people were killed. Also occurring in 1919 were the Chicago Race Riot and Washington D.C. race riot which killed 38 and 39 people respectively, and with both having many more non-fatal injuries and extensive property damage reaching up into the millions of dollars.

== See also ==
- Washington race riot of 1919
- Mass racial violence in the United States
- List of incidents of civil unrest in the United States

== Bibliography ==
Notes

References

- The Bamberg Herald (July 31, 1919). "Newberry Negro Sought by Crowd". The Bamberg Herald. Bamberg, South Carolina: Henry S. Hartzog. pp. 1–8. ISSN 2379-4984. OCLC 13608693.
- The Herald and News (July 29, 1919). "Negro ex-soldier insults little white girl". The Herald and News. Newberry, South Carolina: E.H. Aull. pp. 1–8. ISSN 2333-2786. OCLC 13640295.
- The New York Times (October 5, 1919). "For Action on Race Riot Peril". The New York Times. New York, NY. ISSN 1553-8095. OCLC 1645522.
