= Lynching of Jordan Jameson =

African American who was lynched in the U.S.

- Part of Red Summer
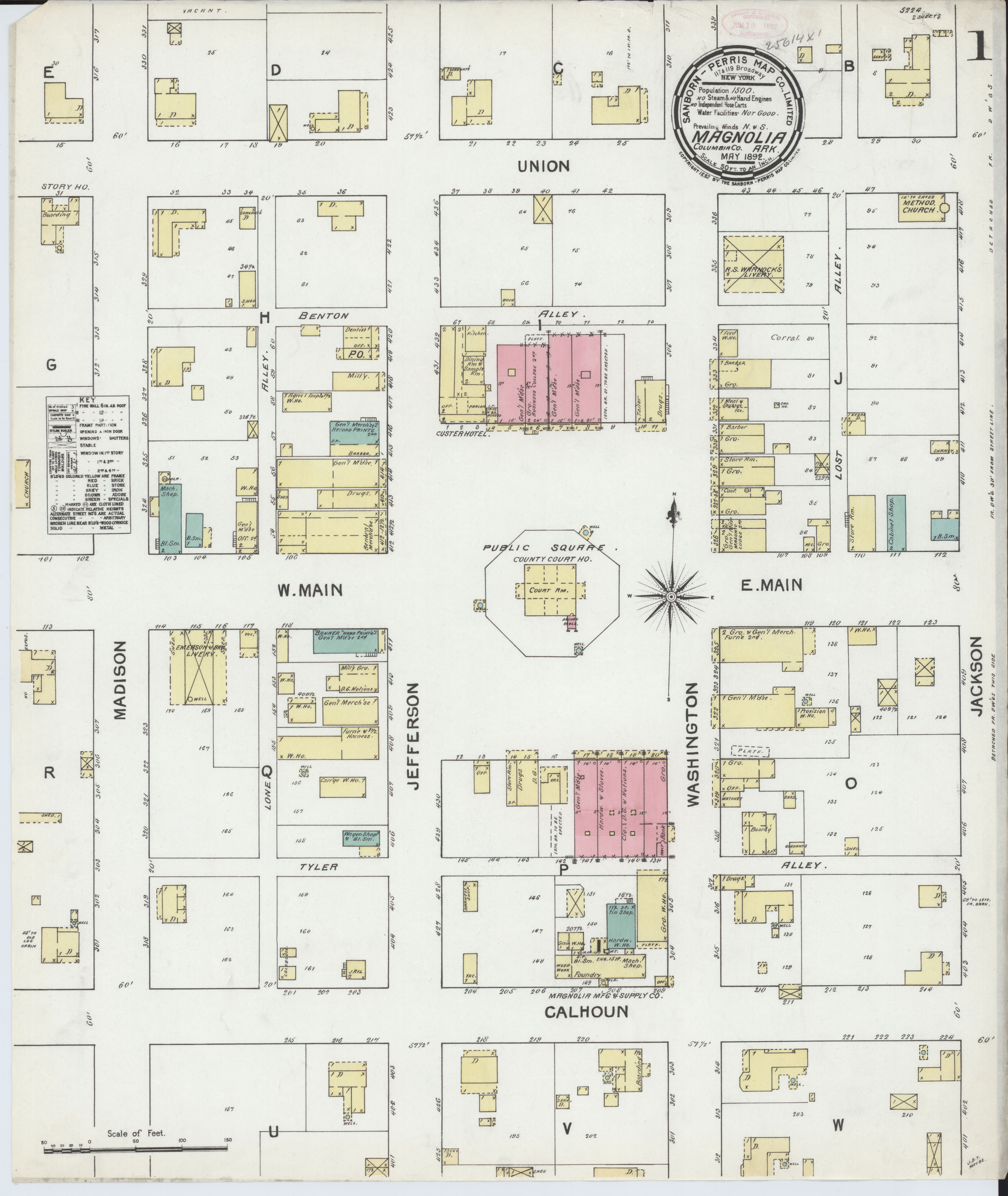
- Town Square where Jordan Jameson was burnt alive
- Date: November 11, 1919
- Location: City of Magnolia's public square; 33°16′1″N 93°14′27″W
- Participants: White mob in Magnolia, Arkansas
- Deaths: 1

An African-American man, Jordan Jameson, was lynched (Note: Some sources identify him as John Jameson) on November 11, 1919, in the town square of Magnolia, Columbia County, Arkansas. A mob seized Jameson after he allegedly shot the local sheriff. They tied him to a stake and burned him alive.

== Background ==
Arkansans were on edge after the deadly Elaine massacre (September 30–October 1, 1919) in rural Elaine, Arkansas. During the riots, hundreds of black people were killed and according to the Encyclopedia of Arkansas, "the Elaine Massacre was by far the deadliest racial confrontation in Arkansas history and possibly the bloodiest racial conflict in the history of the United States."

On November 7, 1919, Columbia County Sheriff Benjamin E. Greer, was heading to the Jordan Jameson house along with deputies Duke Emerson and John Althin. While at the house an altercation broke out which escalated to a shoot out where Greer was shot in the head. In the confusion, Jameson escaped into the forest.

== Lynching ==
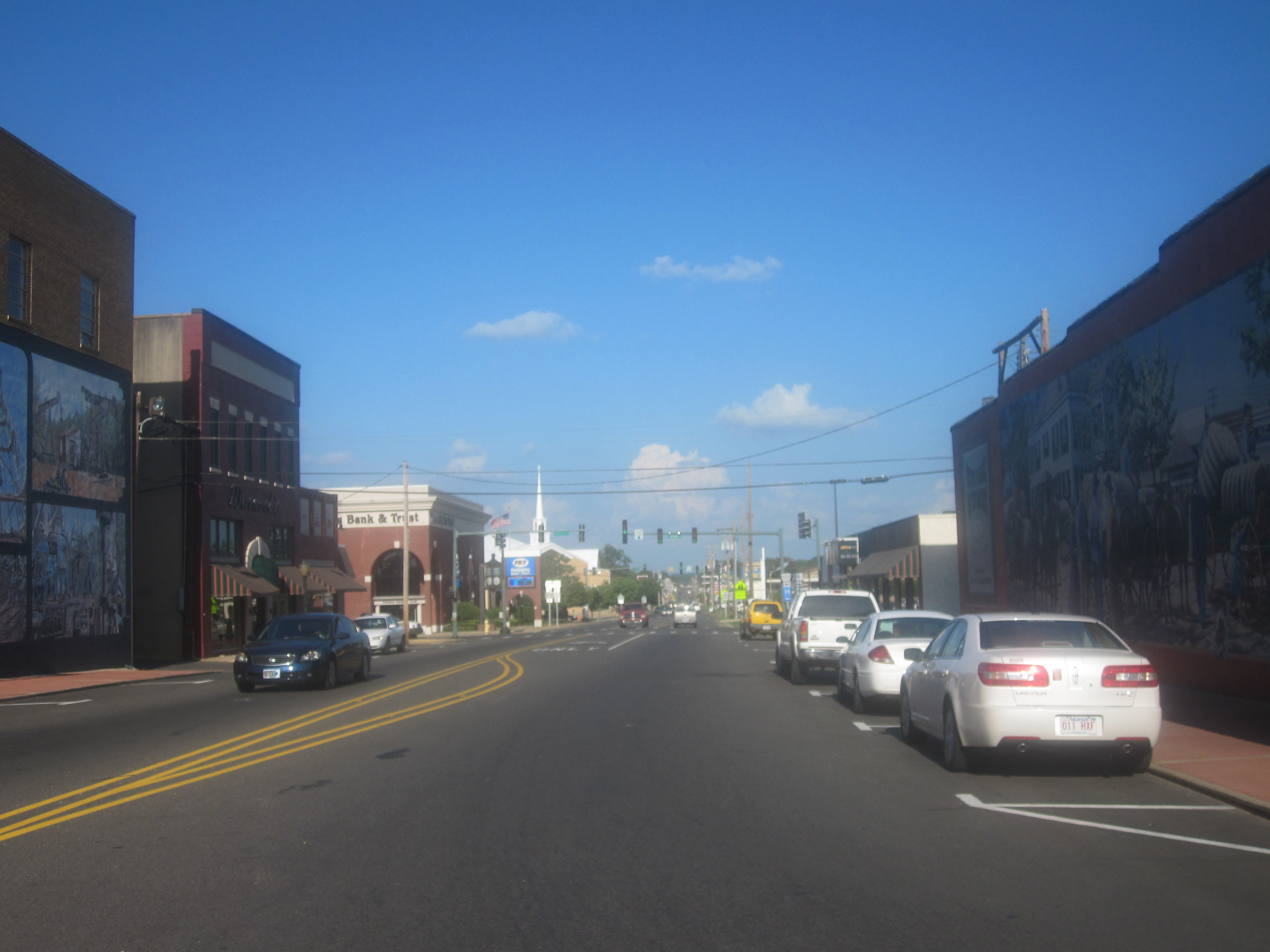
Picture shows the view from the public square where Jameson burnt to death

As word spread that Greer had been killed a white mob quickly formed and started to patrol the area on the lookout for Jameson. At 1:00 AM on November 11, 1919, a posse of ten men: J. T. Bussey, Will Moody, Otha Dickson, Charles Dickson, Charley White, J. A. Sands, Monroe Henry, Ernest Kimball, W. M. Owen, and Will Toland found Jameson and his wife in a house. He was coaxed outside with a promise that the men wouldn't hurt his wife.

After Greer had been killed Governor Charles Hillman Brough appointed Dave Futch as the new sheriff of Magnolia. He tried to bring the situation under control and arrest Jameson but the mob refused to listen or listen to the local law enforcement. On November 11, 1919, at around 5:00 a.m., Jameson was taken to the public square of the city of Magnolia and tied to a stake. Flammable material was stacked around him and in front of a growing crowd of people, it was lit on fire slowly burning Jameson alive. His body was eventually turned over to the black community.

== Aftermath ==
These race riots were one of several incidents of civil unrest that began in the so-called American Red Summer of 1919. Terrorist attacks on black communities and white oppression in over three dozen cities and counties. In most cases, white mobs attacked African American neighborhoods. In some cases, black community groups resisted the attacks, especially in Chicago and Washington DC. Most deaths occurred in rural areas during events like the Elaine massacre in Arkansas, where an estimated 100 to 240 black people and 5 white people were killed. Also in 1919 were the Chicago Race Riot and Washington D.C. race riot which killed 38 and 39 people respectively. Both had many more non-fatal injuries and extensive property damage reaching into the millions of dollars.

== See also ==
- Elaine massacre (September 30–October 1, 1919) in rural Phillips County, Arkansas
- African American veterans lynched after WWI

== Bibliography ==
Notes

References

- The Kansas City Sun (2019). "Arkansas Negro, who slew sheriff, is burned by mob". The Kansas City Sun. Kansas City, Jackson, Missouri: N.C. Crews. pp. 1–8. ISSN 2166-8329. OCLC 21244408.
- Lancaster, Guy (March 1, 2018). "Jordan Jameson (Lynching of)". Encyclopedia of Arkansas History & Culture.
- McWhirter, Cameron (2011). Red Summer: The Summer of 1919 and the Awakening of Black America. Henry Holt and Company. ISBN 9781429972932. - Total pages: 368
- The New York Times (October 5, 1919). "For Action on Race Riot Peril". The New York Times. New York, NY. ISSN 1553-8095. OCLC 1645522.
- Stockley, Grif (September 30, 2019). "Elaine Massacre of 1919". Encyclopedia of Arkansas History & Culture.
