= Charleston riot of 1919 =

Riot in Charleston, South Carolina

- Part of the Red Summer
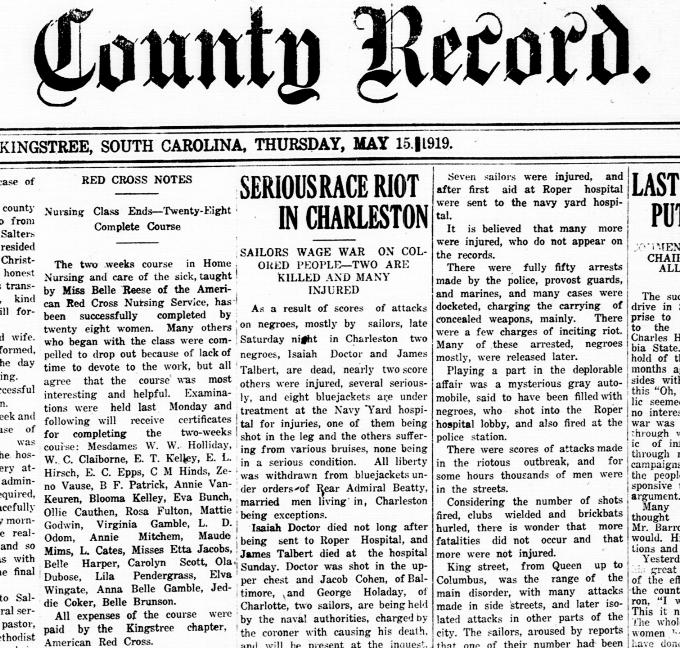
- News coverage of the Charleston riot of 1919
- Date: May 10, 1919
- Location: Charleston, South Carolina, United States
- Outcome: Racial riots by white Americans against black Americans across the United States.
- Deaths: 6

The Charleston riot of 1919 took place on the night of Saturday, May 10, between members of the US Navy and the local black population. They attacked black individuals, businesses, and homes killing six and injuring dozens.

== Charleston riot of 1919 ==
The Charleston riot of 1919 started about 10 p.m. on Saturday, May 10, 1919, and ended after midnight. It began when five white sailors felt they had been cheated by a black man and, unable to find him, attacked African Americans at random. A black man named Isaac Doctor shot at them and was killed. "Within an hour, word of the street brawls and shooting got back to the Charleston Naval Yard and carloads of sailors poured into the black district."

The fighting started at a pool parlor near Beaufain Street and Charles Street (later renamed as Archdale Street) but eventually spread over much of the commercial section of King Street from Queen Street to Columbus Street. There were more than 1,000 sailors, and some white civilians joined in. "Two shooting galleries in Beaufain Street were raided by the sailors, the police reported, and the small caliber rifles removed from the galleries and used by the members of the mob." They attacked black individuals, businesses, and homes. "For a time the rioters practically had possession of the downtown streets. A negro barber shop on King Street was almost wrecked and in several instances street cars were stopped by pulling down the trolley poles and negroes on the cars were beaten up. One negro was shot down as he was snatched off a car."

Admiral Frank Edmund Beatty, "who ran the Navy's southern headquarters from the Charleston Navy Yard," ordered Marines sent in, in addition to naval police. The Marines, although they were not always well disciplined themselves, worked closely with the city police force from a joint command center. The armed Marines arrived shortly after midnight. By 2:30 a.m., order had been reestablished and the riot was over.

This was the worst violence in Charleston since the Civil War. Five blacks were killed, and another died later. Seventeen black men, seven white sailors, and one police officer suffered serious injuries; 35 blacks and eight sailors were admitted to hospitals. Stores had been ransacked, and black businesses and homes damaged, in some cases extensively.

Restrictions were put by the Navy on men going into Charleston, and naval troops patrolled the streets. Two sailors, Jacob Cohen, and Frank Holliday, were court-martialed for manslaughter in the death of 20-year-old William Brown. Cohen and Holliday, who admitted to shooting and killing Brown, were acquitted on the grounds that Brown had failed to heed their orders to halt. However, they were convicted of a lesser charge of rioting. They were each sentenced to a year in a naval prison and given dishonorable discharges. A third sailor, 16-year-old Roscoe Jackson was acquitted of any wrongdoing.

"Forty-nine men, most of them white, were arraigned on charges from murder to rioting to assaulting police officers." Two black and one white man were acquitted of inciting a riot. Charges against the remainder were dropped — police were overwhelmed that night, with little time to spare for taking statements and securing evidence. 8 men received $50 ($900 in 2025) fines for carrying a concealed weapon.

== Aftermath ==
One of Charleston's leading newspapers, The Evening Post, printed an editorial the day after the riots in which blame for the riots was placed squarely on servicemen who were not familiar with Charleston's ways. The piece included the following defense for the city:

The relations between the races in Charleston have always been of the friendliest and it is because there has been such clear definition and acceptance of them and the genuine liking for and the sense of obligation to protect the weaker race, the white people have always had.

The outbreak was a rather startling illustration of the extent to which race prejudice will go when provoked in minds uncontrolled by understanding and experience, and bring into wholesome contrast the consideration and kindness which the white people of Charleston have always shown to the respectable colored people, in whose welfare they have exhibited the most practical concern, and it emphasizes peculiarly the necessity of preserving this excellent relationship by and adherence to the line of conduct which has supported it.

This uprising was one of several incidents of civil unrest that began in the so-called American Red Summer, of 1919. The Summer consisted of terrorist attacks on black communities, and white oppression in over three dozen cities and counties. In most cases, white mobs attacked African American neighborhoods. In some cases, black community groups resisted the attacks, especially in Chicago and Washington, D.C. Most deaths occurred in rural areas during events like the Elaine massacre in Arkansas, where an estimated 100 to 240 black people and 5 white people were killed. Also occurring in 1919 were the Chicago Race Riot and Washington D.C. race riot which killed 38 and 39 people respectively, and with both having many more non-fatal injuries and extensive property damage reaching up into the millions of dollars.

== Bibliography ==
Notes

References

- McWhirter, Cameron (2011). Red Summer: The Summer of 1919 and the Awakening of Black America. Henry Holt and Company. ISBN 9781429972932. - Total pages: 368
- "Few Charleston Men Participated in Race Rioting". New-York Tribune. NYC: New York Tribune. 1919. pp. 1–22. ISSN 1941-0646. OCLC 9405688.
- The New York Times (May 11, 1919). "Report — Six Killed in Sailor-Negro Riot". The New York Times. New York, NY. ISSN 1553-8095. OCLC 1645522.
- New York Times (October 5, 1919). "For Action on Race Riot Peril". The New York Times. New York, NY. ISSN 1553-8095. OCLC 1645522.
- "Two Sailors and 4 Negroes Are Reported to have been Killed in Charleston Riot". Wilmington Morning Star. Wilmington, North Carolina. 1919. ISSN 0163-402X. OCLC 12762829.
