= Syracuse riot of 1919 =

Syracuse, New York riot of 1919
- Part of Red Summer
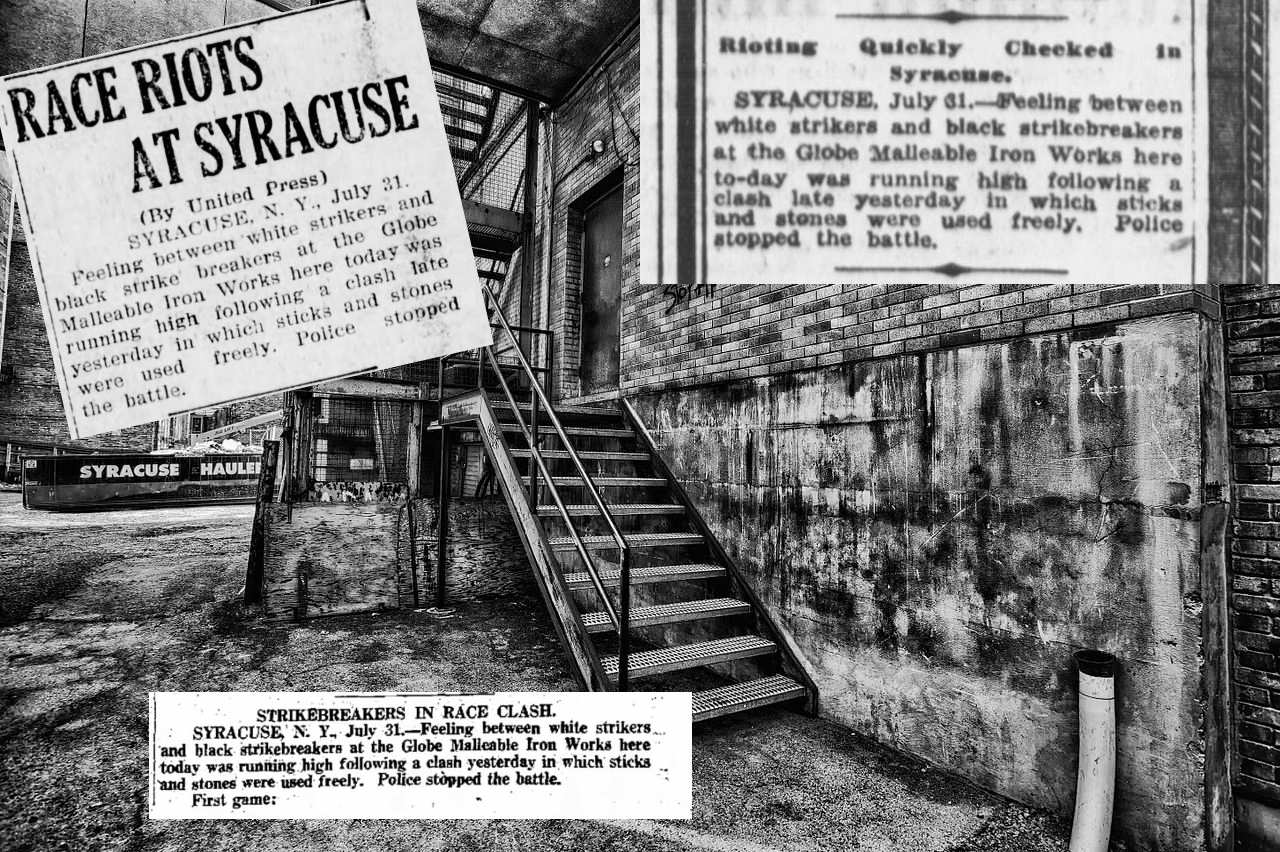
- News coverage of the Syracuse riot of 1919
- Date: July 31, 1919
- Location: Syracuse, New York, United States

The Syracuse riot of 1919 was a violent racial attack that occurred when the management of the Globe Malleable Iron Works pitted striking white unionized workers against black strikebreakers in Syracuse, New York on July 31, 1919.

== National context and background ==
After World War I, white unionized workers across America were facing difficult working conditions and striking for better conditions and pay. At the same time, as part of the Great Migration, black Americans were moving from the South to urban manufacturing towns in the Northeast and Midwest. Most unions were not integrated, and so black Americans found themselves excluded from union jobs (and the relatively higher pay they brought) in the Northern industrial communities to which they migrated. During strikes, large companies throughout the nation turned to these black laborers as a source of cheaper labor, to avoid giving their white workers more money, and with the hope of pitting the two groups against one another to weaken the labor movement. Industry brought in as many as 40,000 black workers as strikebreakers to keep the factories running. The result was a series of attacks by white workers on black strikebreakers throughout the US, including in Chicago's stockyards and in the ironworks at Syracuse.

== Globe Malleable Iron Works race riot ==
The Globe Malleable Iron Works in Syracuse, New York depended on Polish and Italian iron molders. In the summer of 1919 they went out on strike. Hoping to break the strike plant owners brought in black replacement workers. Using clubs, stones, and firearms, the strikers clashed with the African-Americans did “serious damage” on the strikebreakers. At least three white men, Leon Martin, Walinty Winekowski, and Stanislaus Anvziewski, were arrested. The violence ended once the city officials activated the entire police force.

== Aftermath ==
This uprising was one of several incidents of civil unrest that began in the so-called American Red Summer, of 1919. The Summer consisted of terrorist attacks on black communities, and white oppression in over three dozen cities and counties. In most cases, white mobs attacked African American neighborhoods. In some cases, black community groups resisted the attacks, especially in Chicago and Washington, D.C. Most deaths occurred in rural areas during events like the Elaine massacre in Arkansas, where an estimated 100 to 240 black people and 5 white people were killed. Also occurring in 1919 were the Chicago Race Riot and Washington D.C. race riot which killed 38 and 39 people respectively, and with both having many more non-fatal injuries and extensive property damage reaching up into the millions of dollars.

== See also ==
- List of worker deaths in United States labor disputes
- Washington race riot of 1919
- Mass racial violence in the United States
- List of incidents of civil unrest in the United States

== Bibliography ==
Notes

References

- The Evening World (July 31, 1919). "Rioting Quickly Checked in Syracuse". The Evening World. New York, NY: Joseph Pulitzer. pp. 1–22. ISSN 1941-0654. OCLC 9368601.
- The New York Times (October 5, 1919). "For Action on Race Riot Peril". The New York Times. New York, NY. ISSN 1553-8095. OCLC 1645522.
- Rucker, Walter C.; Upton, James N. (2007). Encyclopedia of American Race Riots, Volume 2. Greenwood Publishing Group. ISBN 9780313333026. - Total pages: 930
- San Antonio Express News (July 31, 1919). "Strikebreakers In Race Clash". San Antonio Express-News. San Antonio, Texas. ISSN 1065-7908. OCLC 44717476. Archived from the original on December 6, 1998. Alt URL
- Voogd, Jan (2008). Race Riots and Resistance: The Red Summer of 1919. Peter Lang. ISBN 9781433100673. - Total pages: 234
