= Bisbee Riot =

1919 civil disturbance in Bisbee, Arizona

- Part of Red Summer
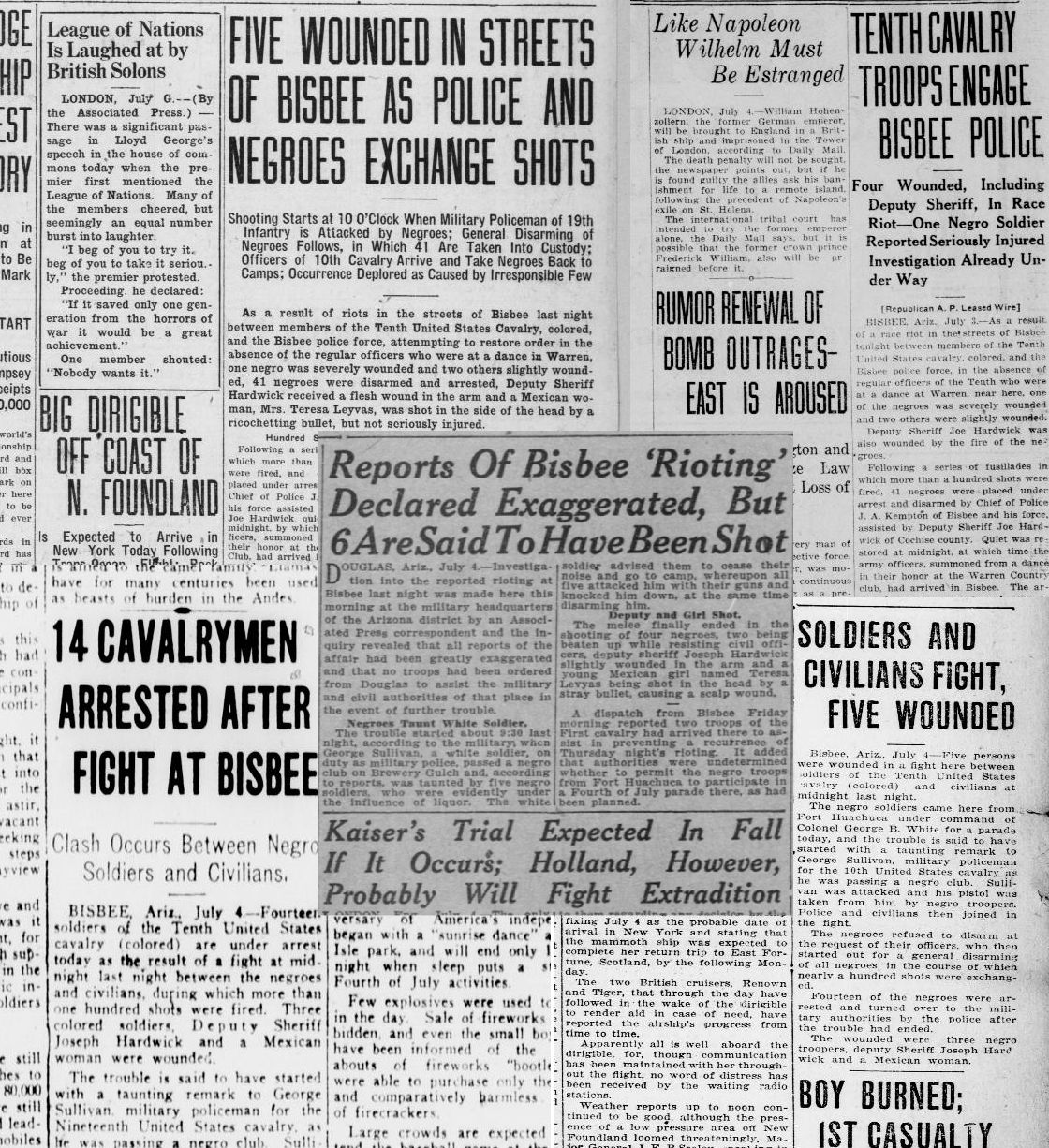
- July 4th US News coverage of the July 3, 1919 Bisbee Riot
- Date: July 3, 1919
- Location: Bisbee, Arizona, United States
- Also known as: Battle of Brewery Gulch
- Outcome: ~8 wounded

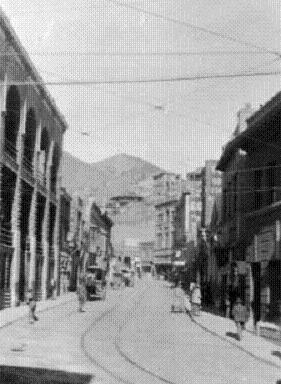
A photograph of Tombstone Canyon in the 1910s

The Bisbee Riot, or the Battle of Brewery Gulch, was a riot that occurred on July 3, 1919, between the black Buffalo Soldiers of the 10th Cavalry and members of local police forces in Bisbee, Arizona.

The Bisbee Riot was a part of the Red Summer of 1919, during which violent race riots, often influenced by white supremacist terrorism, broke out across the country. This riot was unusual for being between police and military, unlike most of the other riots during the Red Summer which involved civilians.

Following a confrontation between a military policeman and some of the Buffalo Soldiers, the situation escalated into a street battle in Bisbee's historic Brewery Gulch. At least fifty soldiers were arrested, eight people were seriously injured, and one bystander was killed.

== Background ==
In 1900, Bisbee had a population of 9,019 people, and an economy centered around the copper mining industry. The city had been described as a “white man’s camp” since the 1880s, following the town's decision to bar Chinese people from staying overnight. Bisbee did, however, have a significant Hispanic population, though they often had fewer job opportunities and substandard pay compared to the city's white population. For example, the town prevented anyone perceived as "Mexican" from doing anything but the most menial mining jobs, as most of these jobs were reserved for the white residents.

In 1913, the Buffalo Soldiers of the 10th Cavalry were stationed at Fort Huachuca, Arizona, for border patrol purposes. They would eventually take part in the Pancho Villa Expedition in 1916. The soldiers would often visit nearby towns, including Bisbee about 35 miles to the east, for social activities like dances and celebrations even though they faced hostilities from the white townspeople. Black communities within Bisbee often sponsored events that the 10th Cavalry was a part of, and some soldiers even married local black women.

The unrest on July 3 would take place in Brewery Gulch, Bisbee's main street and red-light district. Brewery Gulch was lined with brothels, saloons, and gambling halls. This was the site of fighting when unrest broke out.

Mrs. Frederick Theodore Arnold, the wife of the fort's commander in 1918, wrote the following about the town in her diary:

The town was in a gulch just wide enough for one street [with] the stores and houses ... built mostly where rock is dug away, ... all one above the other like the cliff dwellers. Long flights of steps lead on up and up from house to house. It is the queerest town and the street ... runs right up-hill its whole winding length with a streetcar line ... there must be several thousand people there, and it is the busiest place you ever saw ... [There was] an enormous general store with everything from carpet tacks to oranges and hair nets.

Because the demand for copper declined following the end of World War I, many of the miners in town became unemployed. Bisbee authorities were known for their harsh treatment of miners, many of whom were immigrants and minorities, and officials worked to suppress union organizing. In 1917, following a miner's strike led by the International Workers of the World (also referred to as the IWW, or as the Wobblies), the Bisbee police and deputized citizens illegally rounded up hundreds of miners and deported them to New Mexico by train. Morale was poor, and the town was strained socially. After the deportation, the federal government began surveilling Bisbee authorities, and the case against them was still working its way through the courts when the riot occurred. As a result, the most detailed information concerning the riot comes from memos and reports collected by the federal government.

== Riot ==
On July 3, 1919, the 10th Cavalry arrived in Bisbee from Fort Huachuca under the command of Colonel George B. White to march in the Independence Day parade the next day. The Cavalry stayed at the Copper Queen Hotel. Other soldiers were also in Bisbee at the time: provost guards from the all-white 19th infantry. Also in town was an agent from the Bureau of Investigation, O.L. Tinklepaugh, tasked with monitoring the Wobblies and preventing demonstrations from occurring. Upon the arrival of the 10th Cavalry that afternoon, Bisbee Chief of Police James Kempton and Officer William Sherrill began to disarm the black soldiers, who were carrying automatic service pistols on them. The soldiers were told that they could retrieve their weapons from the police station after they left town. About thirty to forty black men were disarmed. Kempton and his officers were approached by one of the Tenth Cavalry's officers, who told the lawmen that the military allowed soldiers to carry their sidearms, if Kempton didn't object. Kempton said that he did mind. Allegedly, the officer ordered the Tenth's troopers not to leave camp armed. Some soldiers ignored this directive.

While the regiment's white officers were attending a prearranged dance, the Buffalo Soldiers went to the Silver Leaf Club, a black club located in the Upper Brewery Gulch. Allegedly, two Wobblies spoke to the soldiers at the Silver Leaf, which attracted the attention of local law enforcement. The speakers left before police could arrive. When police did arrive at the scene, the knowledge that the Wobblies had been there caused the policemen to be on edge.

The first physical violence began outside of the Silver Leaf. A provost guard insulted a nearby trooper, who then allegedly punched the guard in response. At about 9:30 pm, George Sullivan, a white military policeman (MP) from the 19th Infantry, got into a fight with five drunken black soldiers outside the club. According to Sullivan, he exchanged hostile words with the soldiers, who drew their revolvers. Sullivan hit one man on the head and arrested him. Other black soldiers came to aid their colleague and at some point in the fight Sullivan was disarmed. Several citizens came to Sullivan's aid, and validated his report of the encounter. The 10th Cavalry went to the police station and reported the incident to Chief Kempton. Kempton advised the soldiers to turn over their weapons, but they refused. After the soldiers left the station, the chief began to assemble citizens and law enforcement officers to "disarm all the negroes they could find".

Among those that Kempton enlisted was Cochise County Deputy Sheriff Joseph B. Hardwick. He was an Oklahoma native who had once served time for manslaughter. Following his release, he moved his family to Arizona, settling in Cochise County. In 1917 he shot and killed a Mexican ranch hand for allegedly assaulting his daughter. Not long after that incident, Hardwick (who had once worked as a lawman in Washington state) was hired as an officer with the Bisbee Police Department. He first worked with James Kempton, then serving as a Sergeant with the police. In 1918, Hardwick wounded Joel Smith, who had opened fire on Hardwick with a shotgun during a spree in Upper Brewery Gulch. In January 1919, Hardwick accepted a commission as a deputy sheriff under Sheriff James McDonald and for the next several months helped patrol the more remote regions of Cochise County and nearby Douglas.

At this point, word spread that a riot was beginning. White citizens approached local officers and claimed that black soldiers were firing their weapons. Police chief Kempton saw two soldiers about forty yards ahead of him and ordered them to surrender themselves. Kempton claimed the soldiers refused and fired at him. The attempt to disarm the black federal soldiers resulted in a street battle, centered on Brewery Gulch, that lasted for over an hour. Black soldiers at the Silver Leaf exited the club and joined the battle. Additional officers also joined the battle on the side of local police. According to McWhirter, deputized white civilians participated in the fighting; however, Jan Voogd says there is little evidence that Bisbee's local residents played any significant role. Most of the whites involved were documented as city police officers, or Cochise County sheriffs and deputies. Somewhere between 100 and 200 shots were fired during the melee. At some point during the fray, local police ran out of ammunition and sped to the police station to restock.

During the fight, Tinklepaugh attempted to find an official who could defuse the situation. Though he did blame the 10th Cavalry for the violence, he was startled by Hartwick's eagerness to engage in gunfighting. Tinklepaugh first attempted to find more officers at the hotel, but was then informed that they were all attending a dance at the country club. Soldiers approached Tinklepaugh and asked for a ride to Brewery Gulch to defend their fellow troopers. Tinklepaugh then drove to the country club and found George B. White, where he informed him about the ongoing riot.

Fighting ended around midnight, when fifty of the Buffalo Soldiers surrendered to the police. The troopers, fearing further assault from the white police force, refused to give up their weapons. Kempton offered to protect the troopers on the condition that they immediately leave town. The troopers marched out of Bisbee. The remaining soldiers were put on horses and told to ride back to their camp at Warren, under escort by two police cars.

Shortly after the column headed out, five soldiers who had stayed behind began arguing with some of the officers. During this, Deputy Joe Hardwick, who had a reputation as a gunman, pulled out his revolver and shot one of the soldiers in the lung.

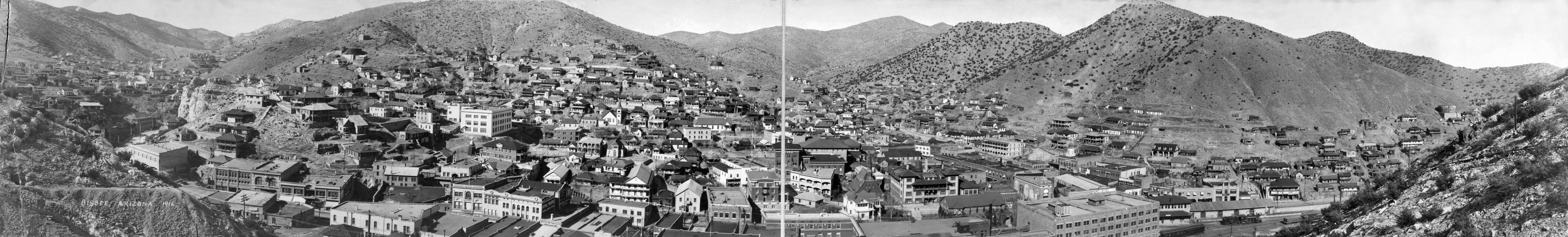
Panorama of Bisbee in 1916

== Aftermath ==
At least eight people were shot or seriously wounded in total: Four of the Buffalo Soldiers were shot, two were beaten, a deputy sheriff was "severely injured," and a Mexican-American bystander named Teresa Leyvas was struck in the head by a stray bullet. In the Army's official report of the incident, commander of the 10th Cavalry, Colonel Frederick S. Snyder, said that “local officials had planned deliberately to aggravate the negro troopers so that they would furnish an excuse for police and deputy sheriffs to shoot them down.” He also charged that the IWW was involved in instigating the riot.

A Bureau of Investigation report said that:

many of the soldiers who were absolutely innocent... were roughly handled... and seriously injured. This was due largely to the activity of Deputy Sheriff Joe Hardwick, who has the reputation of being a gunman and who on this occasion almost completely lost his head.

Bureau of Investigation agents had been surveilling Industrial Workers of the World activity in Bisbee, as the federal government was worried about union organizing. They reported that "representatives" of the IWW were "coach[ing]" the Buffalo Soldiers on what to expect from Bisbee authorities, telling them about the deportation in 1917, and "suggesting that conflict was imminent.”

Ultimately, none of the Buffalo Soldiers was seriously punished for the fighting, at least not by the Army. The 10th Cavalry was permitted to march in the Independence Day parade, under close watch by white US cavalrymen, who had been sent to patrol the streets and prevent further conflict. The Buffalo Soldiers later returned to Fort Huachuca, and their lives were "unfazed" by the events of July 3, according to Voogd. McWhirter says that "[t]he Bisbee fighting, covered nationally, brought to the fore America's conflicting feelings about black participation in the war [World War I/Border War]. Whites demanded black loyalty, but never trusted it."

Joe Hardwick, strongly criticized for his actions, returned to Douglas. Later he was involved in an altercation apparently stemming from the Bisbee Riot; he was soon transferred to Tombstone, Arizona. A few months later, Hardwick turned in his badge and accepted a commission as a Pinal County Deputy Sheriff. In March 1920, Hardwick killed a knife-wielding subject in the town of Superior, Arizona. Hardwick held a number of law enforcement jobs in Arizona for several more years and later became Chief of Police in Calexico, California. There he was known as the "Czar of Calexico" and engaged in a number of other shootings. His career as a lawman ended after he shot and wounded an unarmed produce dealer from Los Angeles.

== See also ==
- United States home front during World War I
- Mexican Border War
- Phoenix Massacre
- List of incidents of civil unrest in the United States
