= New London riots of 1919 =

New London riot of 1919
- Part of Red Summer
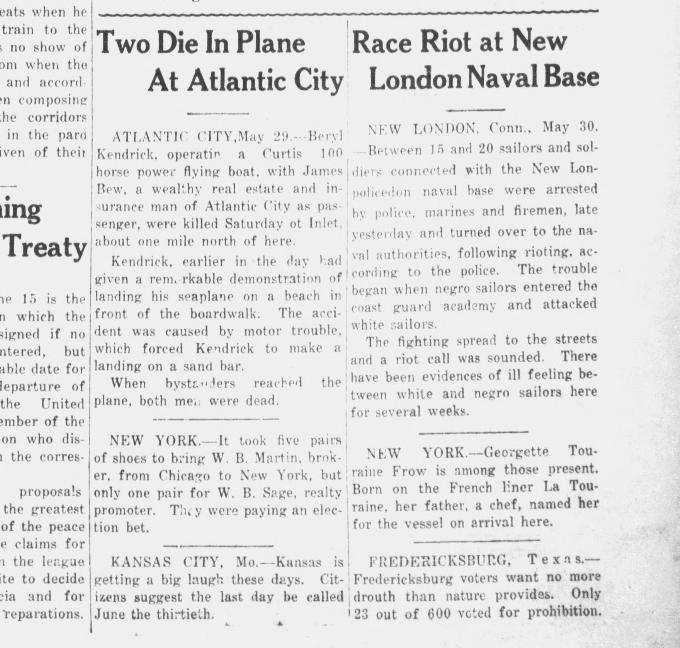
- National news coverage of the New London riot of 1919
- Date: Late May and June 1919
- Location: New London, Connecticut
- Participants: United States Navy, United States Marine Corps, United States Coast Guard

The New London riots of 1919 were a series of racial riots between white and black Navy sailors and Marines stationed in New London and Groton, Connecticut.

== Race violence ==
White and black sailors and marines occupied separate living quarters at the Naval submarine base in Groton, Connecticut in 1919. Racial tensions were high in the Groton and New London area from May to June, and there were several confrontations between the two groups. Black sailors reported that white sailors attacked them, and white Marines accused the black sailors of waiting for them after dark when they crossed Long Cove Bridge. The police arrested two white "Blue Jackets", and white sailors attacked the Hotel Bristol on Bank Street where the black sailors spent most of their free time, throwing a group of blacks out of the hotel on the street and beating them. The police and fire brigades were called but could not stop the rioting. The Marine Corps were eventually called, and they regained control.

On May 30, 1919, about 20 sailors and soldiers were arrested by police officers, marines, and firemen. The Greeneville Daily Sun reported that the trouble began when "negro sailors" entered the Coast Guard Academy in New London and attacked white sailors. On June 29, 1919, another riot erupted which required the Marines to restore order. Author Jan Voogd argues that this riot came to national attention because a fire hydrant was damaged by the marine vehicles. This caused a dispute between the submarine base and city authorities over who would pay for the damage, and so created a paper trail. Voogd posits that there may have been other race riots that went "uncounted, unobserved, and unacknowledged."

== Aftermath ==
These confrontations were among numerous incidents of civil unrest that began in the so-called Red Summer of 1919. The Summer consisted of attacks on black communities in more than three dozen cities and counties. In most cases, white mobs attacked black neighborhoods. In some cases, black community groups resisted the attacks, especially in Chicago and Washington, D.C. Most deaths occurred in rural areas during events such as the Elaine massacre in Arkansas, where an estimated 100 to 240 black people and 5 white people were killed. Also occurring in 1919 were the Chicago Race Riot and Washington, D.C. race riot which killed 38 and 39 people respectively, both having many more non-fatal injuries and extensive property damage.

== See also ==
- Washington race riot of 1919
- Mass racial violence in the United States
- List of incidents of civil unrest in the United States

== Bibliography ==
Notes

References

- The Greeneville Daily Sun (May 31, 1919). "Race Riot at New London Naval Base". The Greeneville Daily Sun. Greeneville, Tennessee: W.R. Lyon. pp. 1–4. ISSN 2475-0174. OCLC 37307396.
- The New York Times (October 5, 1919). "For Action on Race Riot Peril". The New York Times. New York, NY. ISSN 1553-8095. OCLC 1645522.
- Rucker, Walter C.; Upton, James N. (2007). Encyclopedia of American Race Riots, Volume 2. Greenwood Publishing Group. ISBN 9780313333026. - Total pages: 930
- United States Coast Guard (2019). "Coast Guard Cities". United States Coast Guard.
- Voogd, Jan (2008). Race Riots and Resistance: The Red Summer of 1919. Peter Lang. ISBN 9781433100673. - Total pages: 234
