= 1919 Norfolk race riot =

- Part of Red Summer
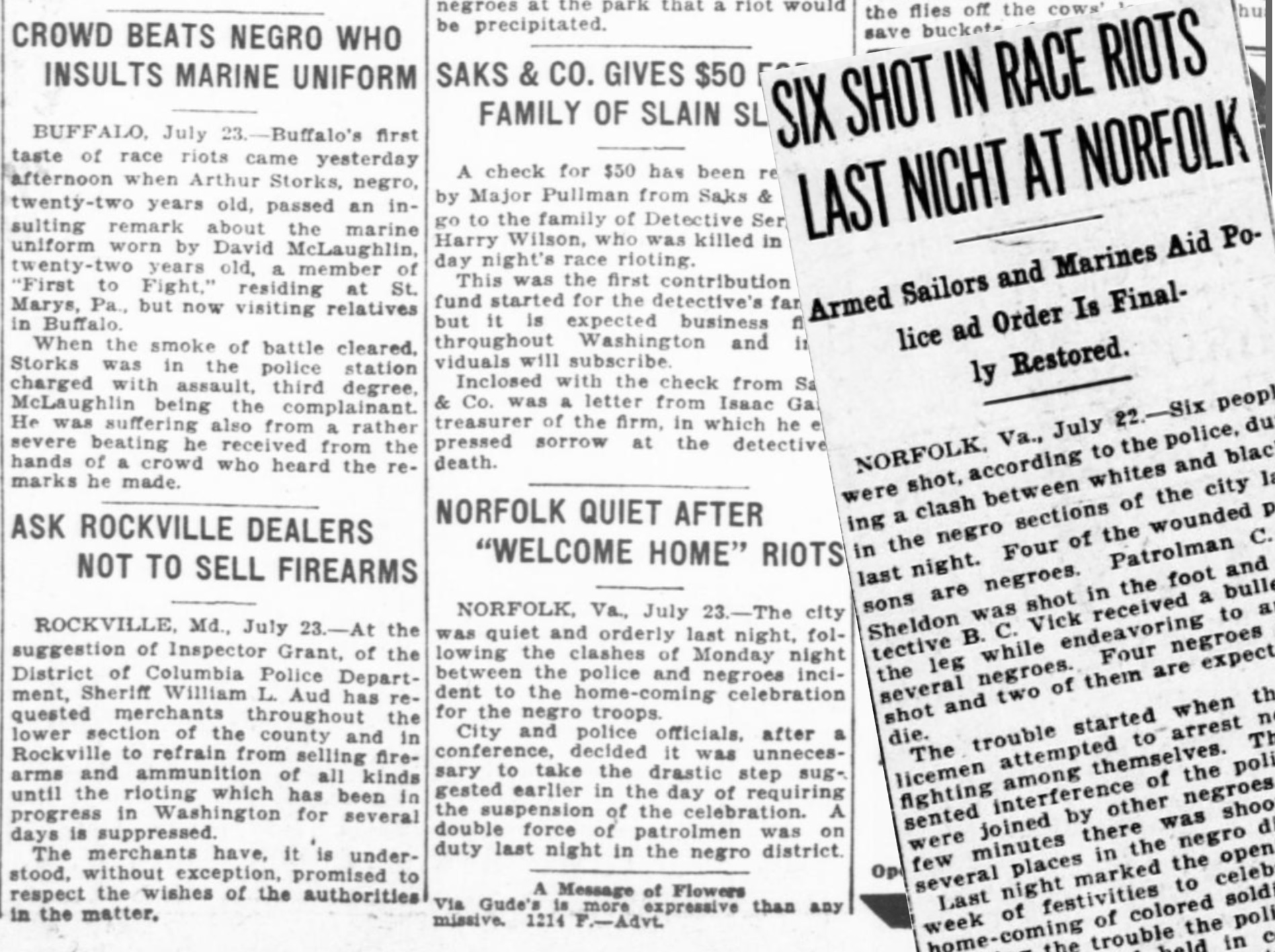
- July US News coverage of the July 12, 1919, race riots in Norfolk
- Date: July 21, 1919
- Location: Norfolk, Virginia, United States
- Deaths: 2
- Injuries: Dozens wounded

The 1919 Norfolk race riot occurred on July 21, 1919, when a homecoming celebration for African American veterans of World War I was attacked in Norfolk, Virginia. At least two people were killed and six people were shot. City officials called in Marines and Navy personnel to restore order.

== Background ==
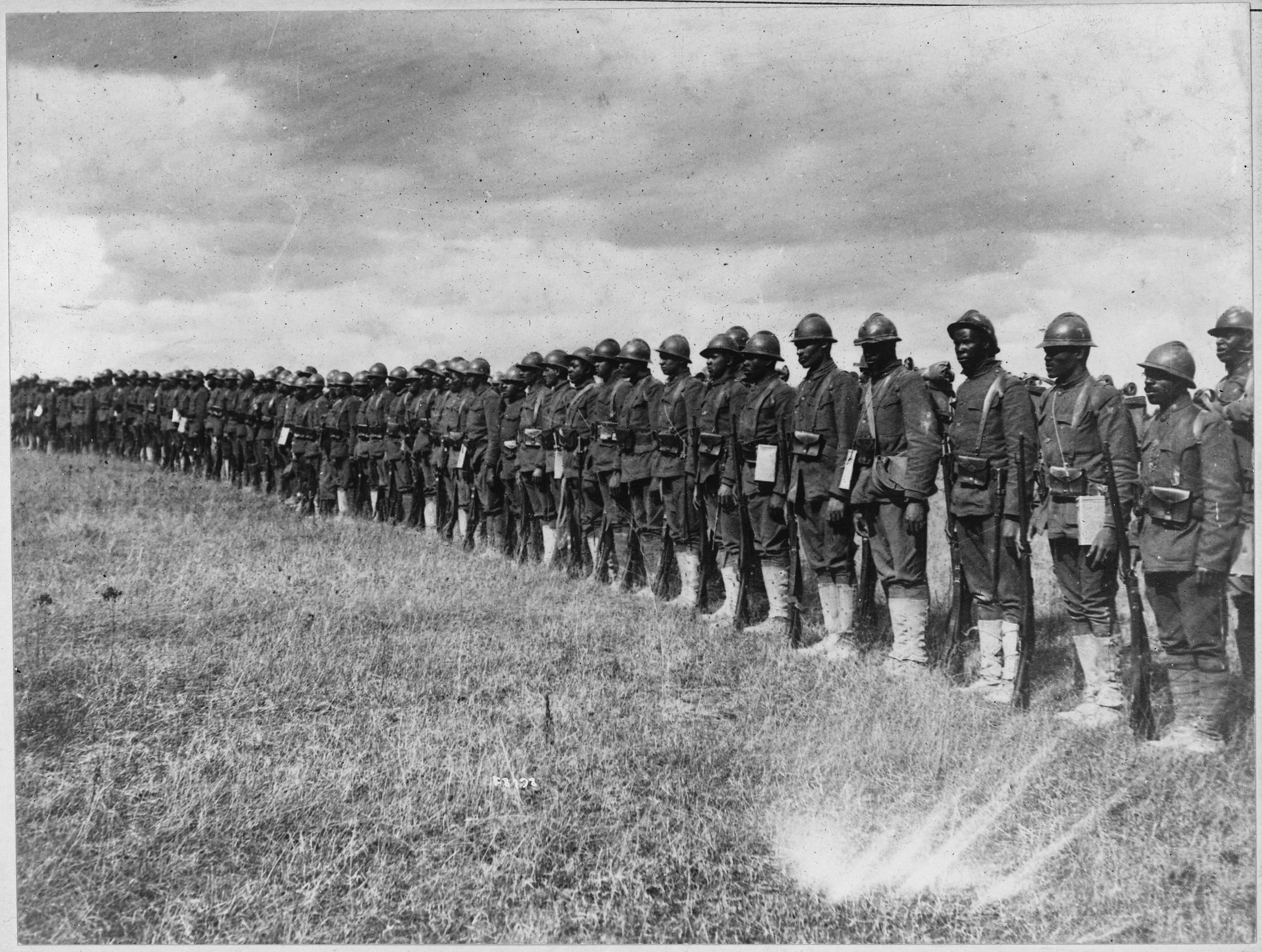
African-American troops in France, c. 1917–19

World War I ended with the signing of the Armistice of November 11, 1918. Though the fighting stopped, the war's potential to resume still existed and peace was only reached when representatives of Germany signed the Treaty of Versailles on June 28, 1919, exactly five years after the assassination of Archduke Franz Ferdinand. The United States entered the war after it had been raging for years. When it did send men to the fronts of Europe, the U.S. armed forces remained segregated, with all-black and all-white units. Despite the segregation, many African Americans still volunteered to join the Allied war effort. By the time of the armistice with Germany, more than 350,000 African Americans had joined the military and risked their lives to serve with the American Expeditionary Force on the Western Front.

In days prior to the riot, tensions were inflamed when civil unrest broke out in the nearby Washington Race Riot. Dozens were killed and even more injured in that riot.

== Incident ==
In July 1919, residents of Norfolk, Virginia, planned a week-long celebration to honor the return of black troops to their city. During the celebration, it was alleged that a fight broke out between African Americans attending the event. White police moved in to make arrests, which sparked a riot that quickly spread to the black neighborhoods of the city. Alarmed, the city authorities called in police reserves and requested help from the navy. The naval base armed 100 sailors and 18 marines, and sent them into the fray to restore order. The clashes between whites and blacks that day resulted in two deaths and several injuries. Police officers C.H. Sheldon and B.C. Vick were shot in the foot and the leg, respectively.

== Aftermath ==
The uprising in Norfolk was one of several incidents of civil unrest that are now known as the American Red Summer of 1919. Attacks on black communities and white oppression spread to more than three dozen cities and counties. In most cases, white mobs attacked African American neighborhoods. In some cases, black community groups resisted the attacks, especially in Chicago and Washington, D.C. Most deaths occurred in rural areas during events like the Elaine massacre in Arkansas, where an estimated 100 to 240 blacks and 5 whites were killed. Other major events of Red Summer were the Chicago race riot and Washington D.C. Race Riot, which caused 38 and 39 deaths, respectively. Both riots had many more non-fatal injuries and extensive property damage reaching up into the millions of dollars.

== See also ==
- Washington race riot of 1919
- Mass racial violence in the United States
- List of incidents of civil unrest in the United States

== Bibliography ==
Notes

References

- Evening star (July 22, 1919). "Six Shot In Race Riot at Norfolk". Crosby Stuart Noyes, Samuel H. Kauffmann and George Adams.
- Evening star (July 23, 1919b). "Presence of soldiers in city helps to keep down rioting". Crosby Stuart Noyes, Samuel H. Kauffmann and George Adams.
- Gilmore, Gerry J. (February 2, 2007). "African-Americans Continue Tradition of Distinguished Service". United States Army.
- McWhirter, Cameron (2011). Red Summer: The Summer of 1919 and the Awakening of Black America. Henry Holt and Company. ISBN 9781429972932. - Total pages: 368
- The New York Times (October 5, 1919). "For Action on Race Riot Peril". The New York Times. ISSN 1553-8095. OCLC 1645522.
- The Washington Times (July 22, 1919). "Six Shot In Race Riot at Norfolk". The Washington Times. Charles G. Conn.
