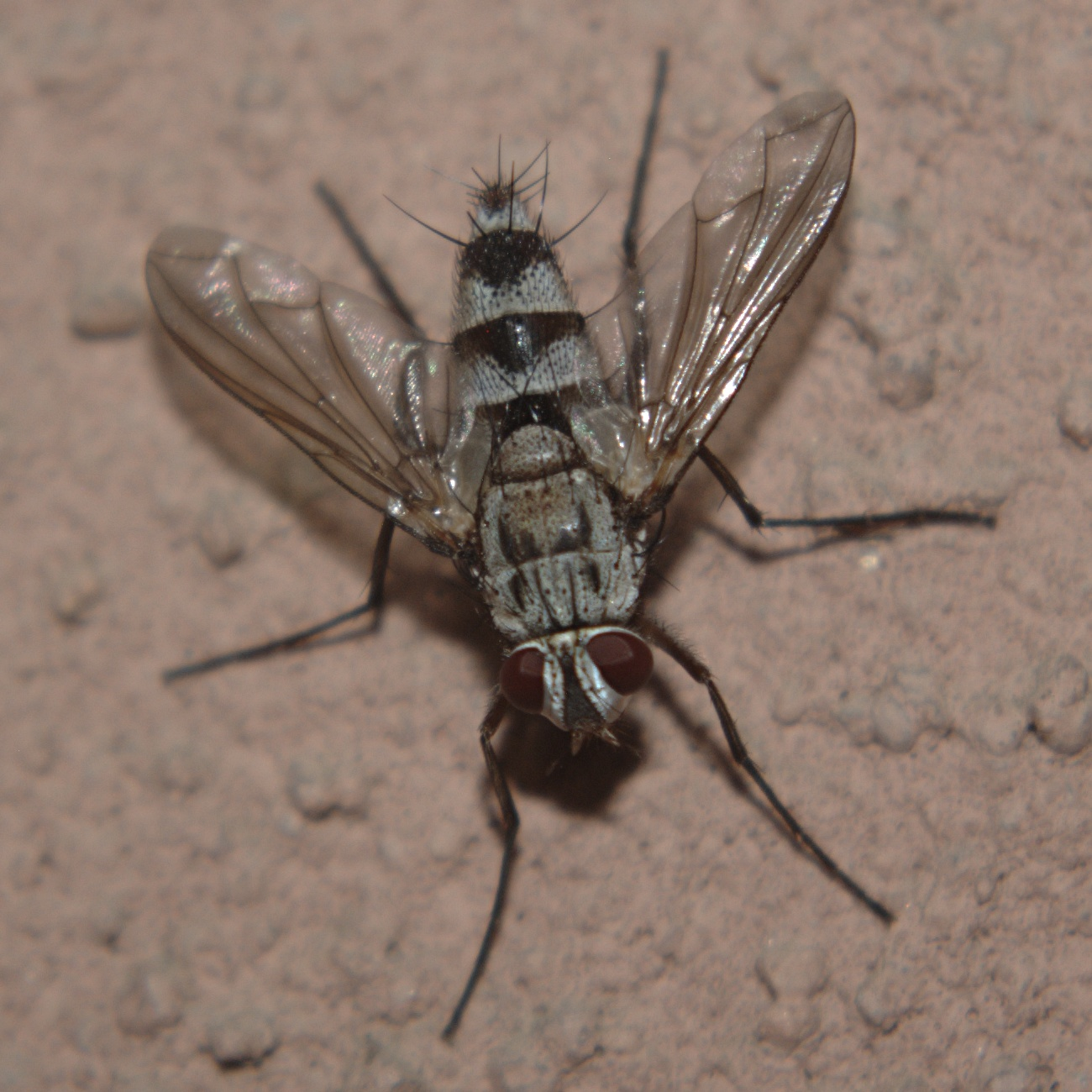
- On a stucco wall

Scientific classification
- Kingdom: Animalia
- Phylum: Arthropoda
- Clade: Pancrustacea
- Class: Insecta
- Order: Diptera
- Family: Tachinidae
- Subfamily: Dexiinae
- Tribe: Dexiini
- Genus: Zelia; Robineau-Desvoidy, 1830

Type species
- Zelia rostrata Robineau-Desvoidy, 1830

Synonyms
- Euzelia Townsend, 1915; Leptoda Wulp, 1885; Melaleuca Wulp, 1891; Metadexia Coquillett, 1899; Minthozelia Townsend, 1919; Opsozelia Townsend, 1919

= Zelia (fly) =

Genus of flies

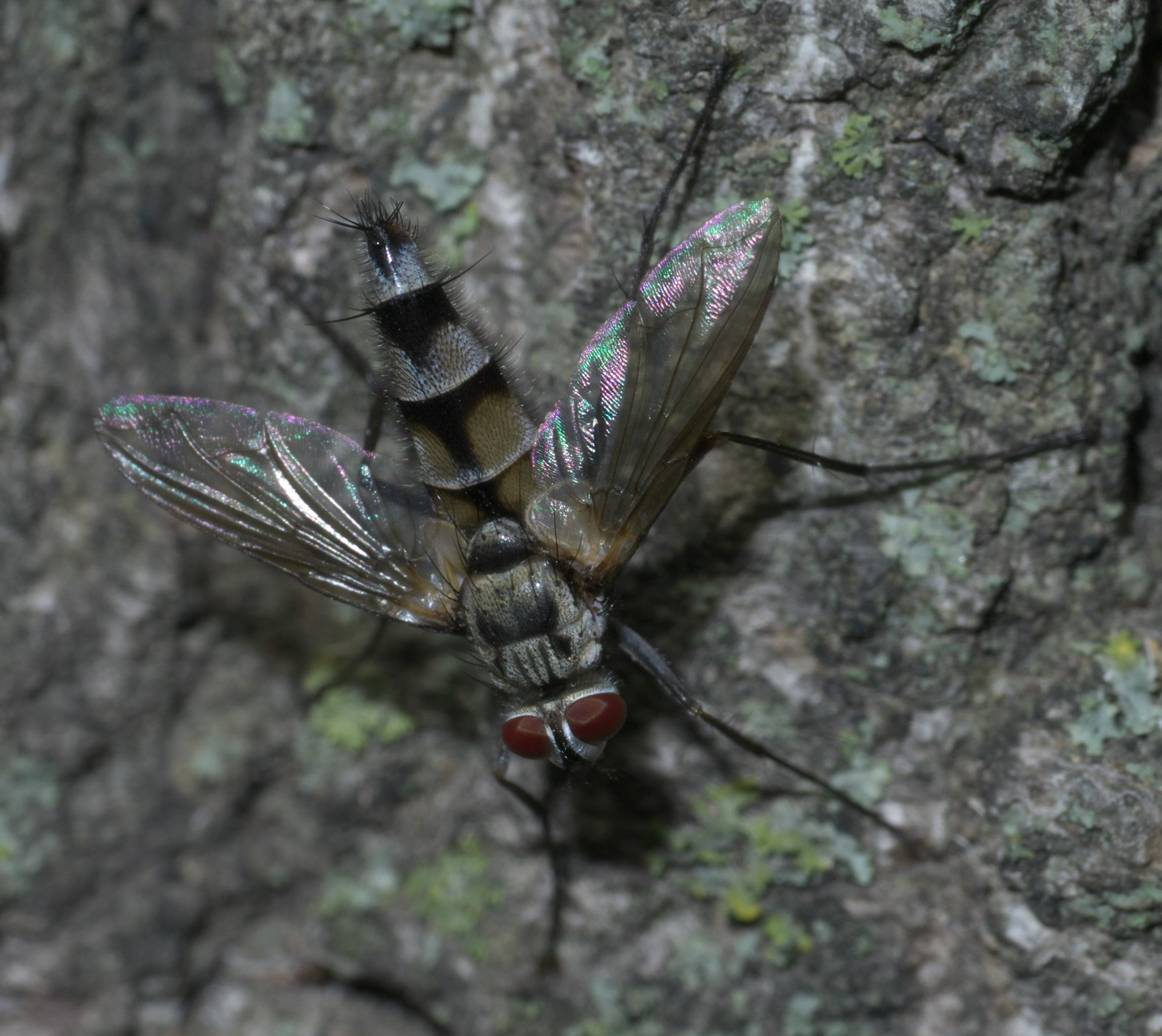

Zelia is a genus of flies in the family Tachinidae. Species in this genus occur exclusively in the Americas.

== Species ==
- Zelia argentosa (Reinhard, 1946)
- Zelia discalis (Townsend, 1919)
- Zelia formosa Dios & Santis, 2019
- Zelia formosa Dios & Santis, 2019
- Zelia gracilis (Reinhard, 1946)
- Zelia guimaraesi Dios & Santis, 2019
- Zelia guimaraesi Dios & Santis, 2019
- Zelia limbata (Wiedemann, 1830)
- Zelia magna Dios & Santis, 2019
- Zelia magna Dios & Santis, 2019
- Zelia metalis (Reinhard, 1946)
- Zelia mira (Reinhard, 1946)
- Zelia montana (Townsend, 1919)
- Zelia nitens (Reinhard, 1946)
- Zelia peruviana (Brèthes, 1920)
- Zelia picta (Bigot, 1889)
- Zelia plumosa (Wiedemann, 1830)
- Zelia potens (Wiedemann, 1830)
- Zelia ruficauda (Reinhard, 1946)
- Zelia rufina (Bigot, 1885)
- Zelia semirufa (Wulp, 1891)
- Zelia spectabilis (Wulp, 1891)
- Zelia tricolor (Coquillett, 1899)
- Zelia vertebrata (Say, 1829)
- Zelia wildermuthii Walton, 1914
- Zelia zonata (Coquillett, 1895)
