= Georgia Mabel DeBaptiste =

American journalist and teacher (1867–1957)

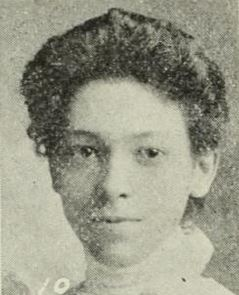
- 1902
- Born: November 24, 1867; Chicago, Illinois
- Died: April 20, 1951 (aged 83); Chicago, Illinois
- Other names: Georgia Mabel DeBaptiste Faulkner, Georgia M. Faulkner, Georgia DeBaptiste Faulkner Ashburn, Georgia DeBaptiste Carr
- Occupations: teacher, journalist, social worker
- Years active: 1890–1943

Georgia Mabel DeBaptiste (November 24, 1867 – April 20, 1951) was an African-American journalist, teacher and social worker from Chicago. After completing her education, she taught at various notable black schools before becoming the first woman of African descent to be employed at the Chicago Post Office.

With her first husband, she did missionary work in Liberia and taught at Liberia College. After his death, she lived in New York and performed social works at a local settlement house before remarrying and moving to Virginia. She taught briefly in Virginia and then returned to Chicago, where she remained for the rest of her life involved in professional community services.

== Early life ==
Georgia Mabel DeBaptiste was born on November 24, 1867, in Chicago to Georgianna Brischo and Richard H. DeBaptiste. She was the youngest child and only daughter of three siblings. Her mother died when she was six and she was raised by her father, a noted writer and preacher.

As a youth, she joined her father's congregation, Olivet Baptist Church in Chicago. She attended elementary school in Chicago, took music courses at the Chicago Musical College and began her high school education at South Division High School, but during her schooling, her father moved to Evanston, Illinois.

She completed her high schooling at Evanston Township High School, and then went on to further her education at Knox College in Galesburg, Illinois.

== Career ==
With the move to Evanston, DeBaptiste began writing. Her first works were published in The Baptist Herald. After two years, the publication folded and she began writing for The Baptist Headlight, The African Mission and became a regular contributor to Our Women and Children.

She began her career in education working as a personal assistant to William J. Simmons at the State University in Louisville, Kentucky. When DeBaptiste left State University, she taught music for a year at Selma University. Though her contract was renewed, she did not like the climate in Selma, Alabama and instead accepted a post as the assistant language and music instructor at Lincoln Institute of Jefferson City, Missouri, working under Inman E. Page. She reluctantly took a position at the Western College and Industrial Institute in Macon, Missouri.

DeBaptiste returned to Chicago and worked for five years as a postal clerk, which she continued even after her marriage on June 20, 1899, to Dr. Henry Clay Faulkner. She was the first woman of the African diaspora to be employed as a clerk by the Chicago Post Office. The couple still living in Chicago in 1902, when DeBaptiste was elected as one of the commissioners at a conference held on August 6–11 to discuss problems and progress black Americans had made, but soon thereafter, they were sent by the Baptist Foreign Missions Board to Liberia. Dr. Faulkner served as a physician and druggist in Monrovia and DeBaptiste was an instructor at the Liberia College. While on a lecture tour in the United States and a visit with her mother-in-law, DeBaptiste learned in January, 1907 that her husband had died in Liberia the previous December.

In 1908, DeBaptiste settled in Brooklyn and continued with speaking engagements and working as a pianist at various functions. The following year, she had been hired as the head worker at the Lincoln Settlement House and continued with both lecturing, music instruction and performances. In 1910, a widowed DeBaptiste was living with her brother Richard Jr., who was a music teacher, and her son Frederick Faulkner (born 1906) in Brooklyn. Over the next several years, she continued with her settlement house work, music and lecturing, before marrying Walter Raleigh Ashburn in Manhattan on June 16, 1915.

Ashburn was the pastor of the Mount Zion Baptist Church of Evanston and in the year of her marriage DeBaptiste became the first president of the Women's Auxiliary to the National Baptist Convention of America, Inc. Soon after their marriage, the couple moved to Virginia, where Ashburn began pastoring at the Cool Springs First Baptist Church of Franklin, Virginia, and DeBaptiste became the general agent of The Ashburn Brothers Shirt Manufacturing Company in Lynchburg. It is probable that during this time, was when she taught at the normal school of Clifton Forge Normal and Industrial Institute and the Virginia Theological Seminary and College in Lynchburg.

DeBaptiste was re-elected to that presidency of the Women's Auxiliary in 1917 and by that time, was living in Chicago and she and Ashburn had apparently separated. His biographer notes that the couple separated for unspecified reasons and he remarried his fourth wife before his death in 1939. She joined the Bahá'í Faith in 1918, (and still active as one decades on.) From then forward, DeBaptiste worked as a professional doing community work. She served as a social worker and organizer in the Butler Community and was the superintendent of the Methodist Episcopal Church-sponsored Home for Business and Working Young Women in the 1920s. In 1922, she was one of the captains of the National Association for the Advancement of Colored People (NAACP) drive in Chicago to boost membership. In 1923, she was re-elected again for the top post of the Women's Auxiliary.

The following decade, she supervised the Youth's Conservation Council and School's education department. Very active in clubs and organizations, DeBaptiste was president of the District Teacher's Association of Chicago and the Mother's Union. She was involved with the NAACP, the Urban League, the YWCA and the World's Fellowship of Faiths, as well as serving as president of the exclusive Old Settler's Club in 1943. Sometime prior to the announcement of the Old Settler's Club 111th anniversary exhibition, DeBaptiste married a man surnamed Carr.

== Death and legacy ==
DeBaptiste died on April 20, 1951, aged 83, in Chicago and was buried in the Lincoln Cemetery in Worth, Illinois.
