= Inman A. Breaux =

American football coach, college administrator (1908–1967)

Biographical details
- Born: October 4, 1908; St. Louis, Missouri, U.S.
- Died: November 24, 1967 (aged 59); Guthrie, Oklahoma, U.S.

Playing career

Football
- 1926–1929: Virginia Union

Basketball
- c. 1926–1930: Virginia Union

Baseball
- c. 1927–1930: Virginia Union

Track and field
- c. 1926–1930: Virginia Union
- Positions: Quarterback (football); 100-yard dash, 200-meter dash (track and field)

Coaching career (HC unless noted)

Football
- 1932–1938: North Carolina A&T
- 1939–1941: Douglass HS (OK)
- 1946: Langston (assistant)

Administrative career (AD unless noted)
- 1939–1942: Douglass HS (OK)

Head coaching record
- Overall: 28–24–8 (college)

Inman Armogen Breaux Sr. (October 4, 1908 – November 24, 1967) was an American football coach, athletics administrator, and educator. He served as the head football coach at Negro Agricultural and Technical College of North Carolina—now known as North Carolina A&T University—from 1932 to 1938.

Breaux was the son of music educator Zelia N. Breaux and the grandson of educators Inman E. Page and Zelia Ball Page. Breaux attended Virginia Union University, where he played football from 1926–1929 as a quarterback. At Virginia Union he also lettered in basketball and baseball, and competed in track and field. He later earned a Bachelor of Physical Education degree from Springfield College in Springfield, Massachusetts and a Master of Arts degree from New York University (NYU).

In 1932, Breaux was hired as the head football coach at North Carolina A&T. In 1939, he was appointed athletic director at Frederick A. Douglass High School in Oklahoma City. He also coached football at Douglass High School before entering the United States Army in 1942, when he was succeed as the school's football coach by Vernon McCain.

Breaux died on November 24, 1967, in a tractor accident, at his home in Guthrie, Oklahoma. At the time of his death, he was serving as a physical education faculty member and financial aid director at Langston University in Langston, Oklahoma.

== Head coaching record ==
=== College ===
Year	Team	Overall	Conference	Standing	Bowl/playoffs
North Carolina A&T Aggies (Colored Intercollegiate Athletic Association) (1933–1936)
1932	North Carolina A&T	2–5	1–5	9th	
1933	North Carolina A&T	3–3–3	3–3–3	6th	
1934	North Carolina A&T	7–1	7–1	3rd	
1935	North Carolina A&T	6–2–1			
1936	North Carolina A&T	5–4	4–4	7th	
1937	North Carolina A&T	2–4–3	2–4–2	8th	
1938	North Carolina A&T	3–5–1	2–4–1	8th	
North Carolina A&T:		28–24–8			
Total:		28–24–8			
