= Chicago race riot of 1919 =

August 1919 racial tensions in Chicago, Illinois, US

- Part of the Red Summer and the Nadir of American race relations
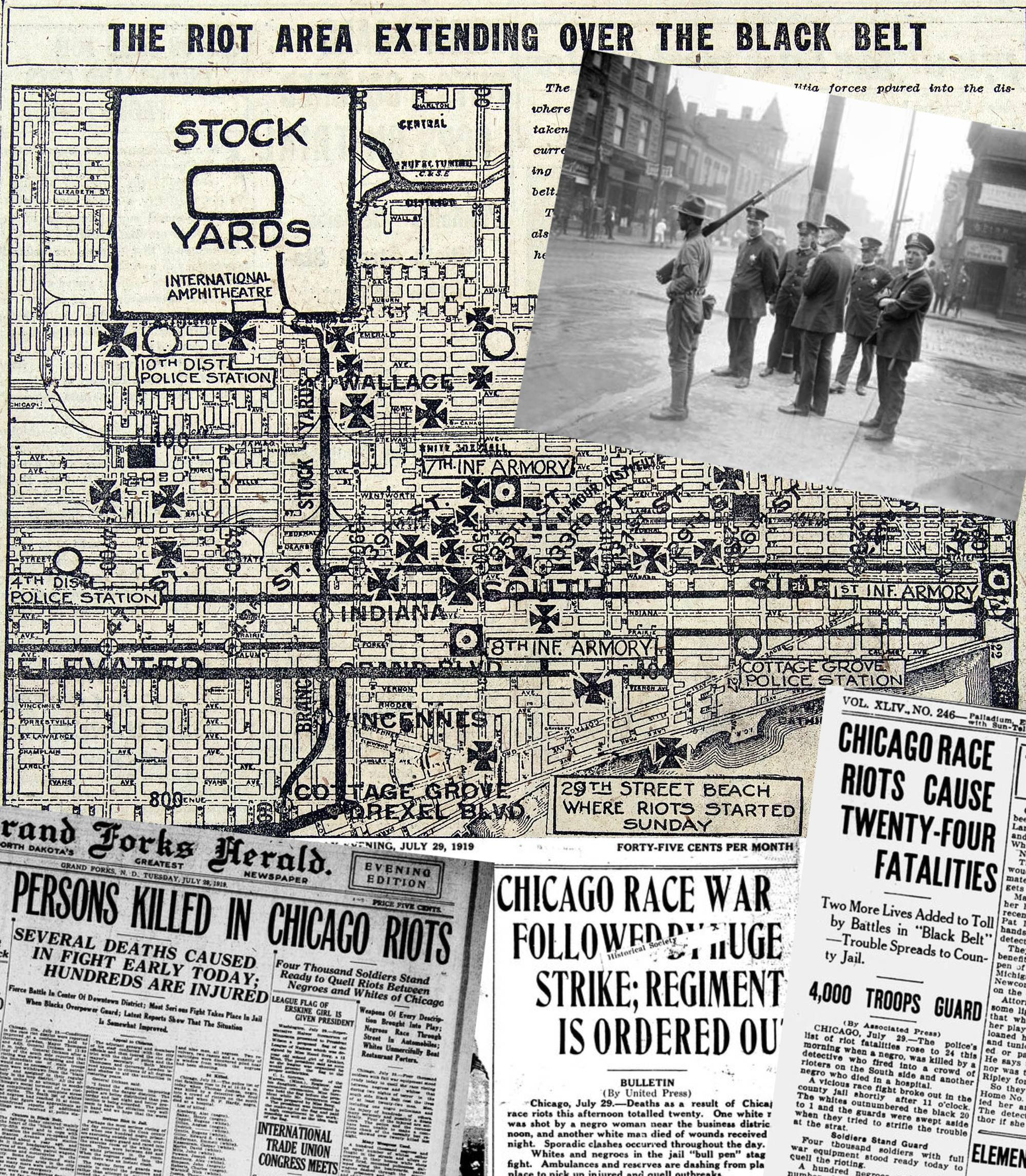
- Five police officers and a National Guard soldier with a rifle and bayonet standing on a corner in the Douglas neighborhood
- Date: July 27 – August 3, 1919
- Location: Chicago, United States
- Deaths: 38

The Chicago race riot of 1919 was a violent racial conflict between white Americans and black Americans that began on the South Side of Chicago, Illinois, on July 27 and ended on August 3, 1919. During the riot, 38 people died (23 black and 15 white). Over the week, injuries attributed to the episodic confrontations stood at 537, two-thirds black and one-third white; and between 1,000 and 2,000 residents, most of them black, lost their homes. Due to its sustained violence and widespread economic impact, it is considered the worst of the scores of riots and civil disturbances across the United States during the "Red Summer" of 1919, so named because of its racial and labor violence. It was also one of the worst riots in the history of Illinois.

In early 1919, the sociopolitical atmosphere of Chicago around its rapidly growing black community was one of ethnic tension caused by long-standing racism, competition among new groups, an economic slump, and the social changes engendered by World War I. With the Great Migration, thousands of African Americans from the American South had settled next to neighborhoods of European immigrants on Chicago's South Side, near jobs in the stockyards, meatpacking plants, and industry. Meanwhile, the long-established Irish fiercely defended their neighborhoods and political power against all newcomers. Post-World War I racism and social tensions built up in the competitive labor and housing markets. Overcrowding and increased African-American resistance against racism, especially by war veterans, contributed to the racial tension, as did white-ethnic gangs unrestrained by police.

The turmoil came to a boil during a summer heat wave with the murder of the 17-year-old Eugene Williams, an African-American teenager who inadvertently had drifted into a white swimming area at an informally segregated beach near 29th Street. A group of African-American youths were diving from a 14-foot by 9-foot raft that they had constructed. When the raft drifted into the unofficial "white beach" area, one white beachgoer was indignant; he began hurling rocks at the young men, striking Williams, and caused the teen to drown. When black beachgoers complained that whites attacked them, violence expanded into neighborhoods. Tensions between groups arose in a melee, which became days of unrest. Black neighbors near white areas were attacked, white gangs went into black neighborhoods, and black workers going to and from work were attacked. Meanwhile, some black civilians organized to resist and protect each other, and some whites sought to lend aid to black civilians, but the Chicago Police Department often turned a blind eye, or worse, joined in on the violence. Sections of Chicago industry were shut down for several days during and after the riots to avoid interaction among the opposing groups. Chicago Mayor William Hale Thompson had a game of brinksmanship with Illinois Governor Frank Lowden that may have exacerbated the riot, since Thompson refused to ask Lowden to send in the Illinois Army National Guard for four days, although Lowden had called up the guardsmen, organized in Chicago's armories and ready to intervene.

After the riots, Lowden convened the Chicago Commission on Race Relations, a nonpartisan, interracial committee, to investigate the causes and to propose solutions to racial tensions. Their conclusions were published by the University of Chicago Press as The Negro in Chicago: A Study of Race Relations and a Race Riot. U.S. President Woodrow Wilson and the U.S. Congress attempted to promote legislation and organizations to decrease racial discord in America. Governor Lowden took several actions at Thompson's request to quell the riot and promote greater harmony in its aftermath. Thompson drew on his association with the riot to influence later political elections. One of the most lasting effects may have been decisions in both white and black communities to seek greater racial separation.

== Background ==
Unlike Southern cities at the time, Chicago did not segregate most public accommodations. According to Walter Francis White of the NAACP, pre-1915 Chicago had a good reputation for equitable treatment of African Americans. However, in the early 20th century, Chicago beaches were unofficially racially segregated. African Americans had a long history in Chicago, with the city sending Illinois's first African-American representative, John W. E. Thomas, to the state legislature in 1876, but even so, the community had been relatively small through the 19th century. While blacks in 1900 were only about one percent of the total population of a city that had seen large European immigration, Chicago's black population expanded in the early years of the 20th century. By 1910, thousands of African Americans were moving from the South to Chicago, as a major destination in the Great Migration to industrial cities in the Northeast and Midwest, fleeing lynchings, segregation and disenfranchisement in the Deep South. The revived Ku Klux Klan in the South committed 64 lynchings in 1918 and 83 in 1919. With industrial jobs in the stockyards and meatpacking industry opening as European immigration was cut off by World War I, the African-American population in Chicago increased by 148%, from 44,000 to 109,000, from 1916 to 1919.

The growing African-American population settling in the South Side bordered a neighborhood of Irish Americans existing since the mid-19th century, and the two groups competed for low-end jobs and housing, alongside earlier waves of immigrants from Southern and Eastern Europe. Ethnic groups were possessive of their neighborhoods, which their young men often patrolled against outsiders. Because of agricultural problems, Southern whites also migrated to the city, about 20,000 by this period. The rapid influx of migrants caused overcrowding from a lack of low-cost housing.

"Earlier in 1919, there were race riots in Memphis, Tenn.; Charleston, S.C.; and Philadelphia, so his editor sent [Carl] Sandburg to take the pulse of Chicago's impoverished areas. [¶] Walking its streets, Sandburg foresaw an inevitable clash between dreams and fears. Black Southerners had come to Chicago envisioning opportunities long denied them. "A door once inscribed, 'No hope,' now says, 'There is hope,'" he wrote. [¶] But where black people saw opportunity, white Chicagoans saw a threat. "Here and there, slowly and by degrees, the line of color discrimination breaks," Sandburg wrote shortly before the [Chicago] riots.

—

In 1917, two summers before the Chicago riot, large and deadly race riots broke out in the expanding war-time cities of East St. Louis, Illinois and Houston, Texas, influencing the violent events of Red Summer across the nation and in Chicago. The postwar period also found tensions rising in numerous rapidly growing cities where people from different cultures jostled against each other and competed for space. In 1917, the privately run Chicago Real Estate Board established a policy of block-by-block segregation. New arrivals in the Great Migration generally settled in older black neighborhoods on the South Side. By 1920, the area held 85% of Chicago's African Americans, whether middle class, upper class or poor.

In the post-war period, military veterans of all groups were looking to re-enter the work force despite the post-war economic slump. Some whites resented African-American veterans. At the same time, African-American veterans exhibited greater militancy and pride serving to protect their country, in units such as the Illinois 8th Infantry. They expected to be treated as full citizens after fighting for the nation. Meanwhile, younger black men rejected the deference and passivity traditional in the South, and they promoted armed self-defense for control of their neighborhoods.

In Chicago, the Irish-dominated social and athletic clubs were closely tied to the political structure of the city, some acting as enforcers for politicians. As the first major group of 19th-century European immigrants to settle in the city, the Irish had established formal and informal political strength. The Irish had long patrolled their neighborhood boundaries against all other ethnic groups, especially African Americans, and, as white-ethnic gangs began attacking people in African-American neighborhoods, the police — overwhelmingly white and increasingly Irish American — seemed little inclined to stop them. An example of ethnic territoriality was the Bridgeport community area, an Irish neighborhood just west of the Black Belt. There, the Hamburg Athletic Club, whose members included a 17-year-old Richard J. Daley, future mayor of Chicago, contributed to gang violence in the area. Meanwhile, newspapers carried sensational accounts of African-American crime.

== The riot ==
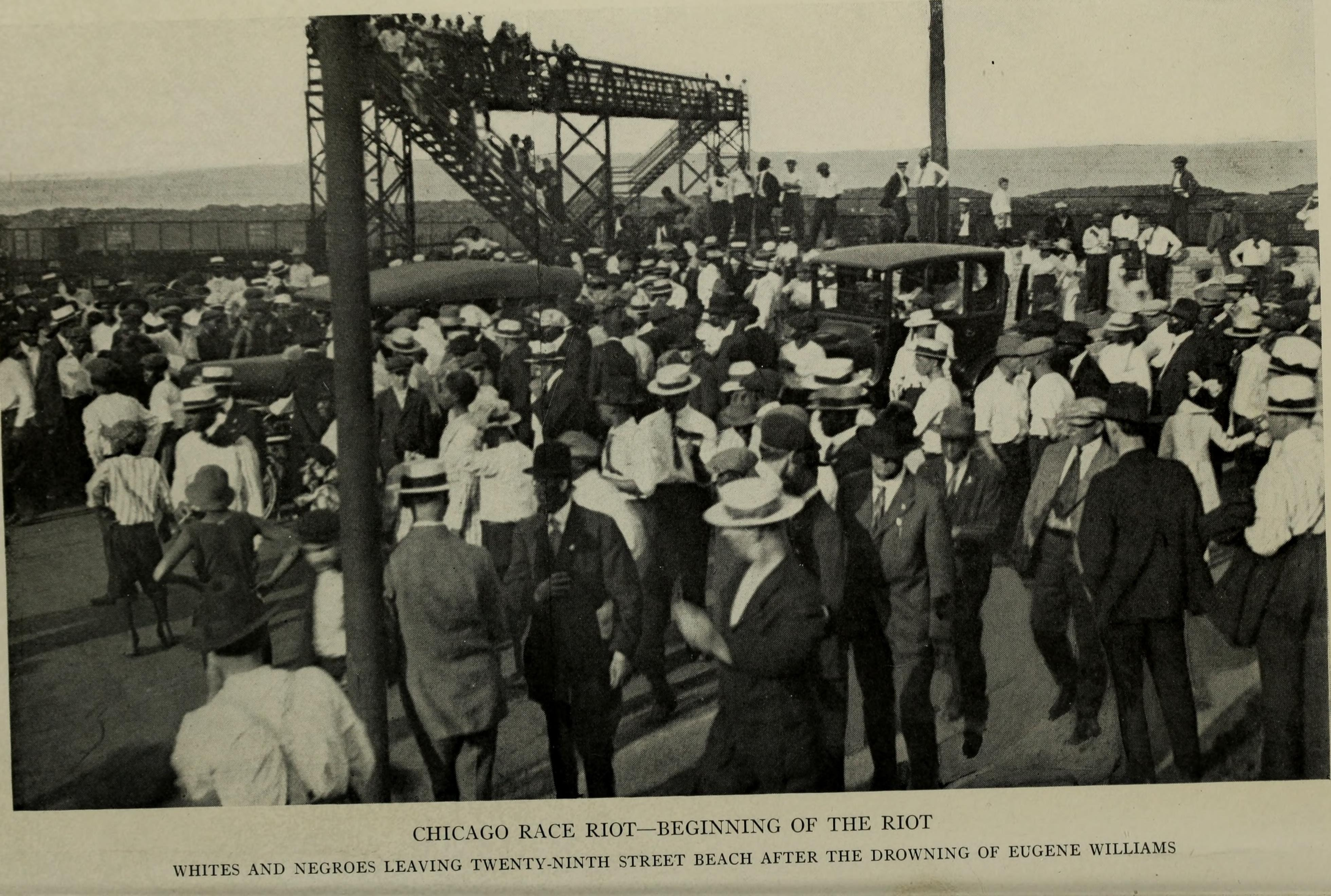
Pedestrian bridge over the roadway leading to the 29th Street Beach

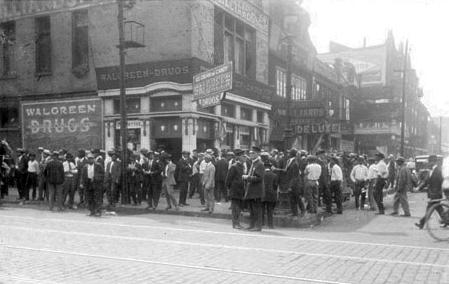
Black men in front of Walgreen Drugs (now called Walgreens) at 35th and S. State St. in the Douglas community area

Longstanding racial tensions between whites and blacks exploded in five days of violence that started on July 27, 1919. On that hot summer day, on an unofficially segregated Chicago beach, a white man threw stones at Eugene Williams when he crossed the unmarked and unofficial 'color line' between the white and black sections of the 29th Street beach. Williams drowned. Tensions escalated when a white police officer prevented a black police officer from arresting the white man responsible for Williams's death, but arrested a black man instead. Objections by black observers were met with violence by whites. Attacks between white and black mobs erupted swiftly. At one point, a white mob threatened Provident Hospital, many of whose patients were African American. The police successfully held them off.

There were also attempts by the ethnic Irish gangs to incite Southern and Eastern European immigrant communities to violence against blacks, although they had no history of such hostility. In one instance, members of the Irish Ragen's Colts donned blackface and set fire to Lithuanian and Polish homes in the Back of the Yards in an attempt to incite this community to join them against African Americans. Contrary to the violence, some cooperation also occurred, with some whites seeking to help save Eugene Williams, reporting other whites to the police, denouncing the violence, and bringing food to black communities.

The Chicago riot lasted almost a week, ending only after the Government of Illinois deployed nearly 6,000 Illinois Army National Guard troops around the Black Belt to prevent further white attacks. The majority of the rioting, murder, and arson was committed by white ethnic groups attacking the Black Belt on the South Side, while most of the casualties and property damage were suffered by black Chicagoans. Newspaper accounts noted numerous attempts at arson. For instance, on July 31, more than 30 arson fires were started in the Black Belt before noon, while rioters stretched cables across the streets to keep out fire trucks. The Chicago mayor's office was informed of a plan to burn down the black area and run its residents out of town. There were also sporadic violent attacks in other parts of the city, including the Chicago Loop. Because of the rioting, 38 people died (23 African American and 15 white), and another 537 were injured, two-thirds of them African American; African-American patrolman John W. Simpson was the only policeman killed in the riot. Approximately 1,000 residents were left homeless after the fires. Many African-American families left by train during the riot, returning to their families in the South.

To help restore order, Chief of Police John J. Garrity closed "all places where men congregate for other than religious purposes". Illinois Governor Frank Lowden authorized the deployment of the 11th Illinois Infantry Regiment and its machine gun company, as well as the 1st, 2nd and 3rd reserve militia, a total of 3,500 men. The Cook County Sheriff deputized between 1,000 and 2,000 ex-soldiers to help keep the peace. With the reserves and militia guarding the Black Belt, the city arranged for emergency provisions to provide its residents with food. White groups delivered food and supplies to the line established by the military, who passed them on to African Americans for distribution within the Black Belt. While industry was closed, the packing plants arranged to deliver pay to certain places in the city so that African-American men could pick up their wages.

Once order was restored, Lowden was urged to create a state committee to study the cause of the riots. He proposed forming a committee to write a racial code of ethics and to draw up racial boundaries for activities within the city.

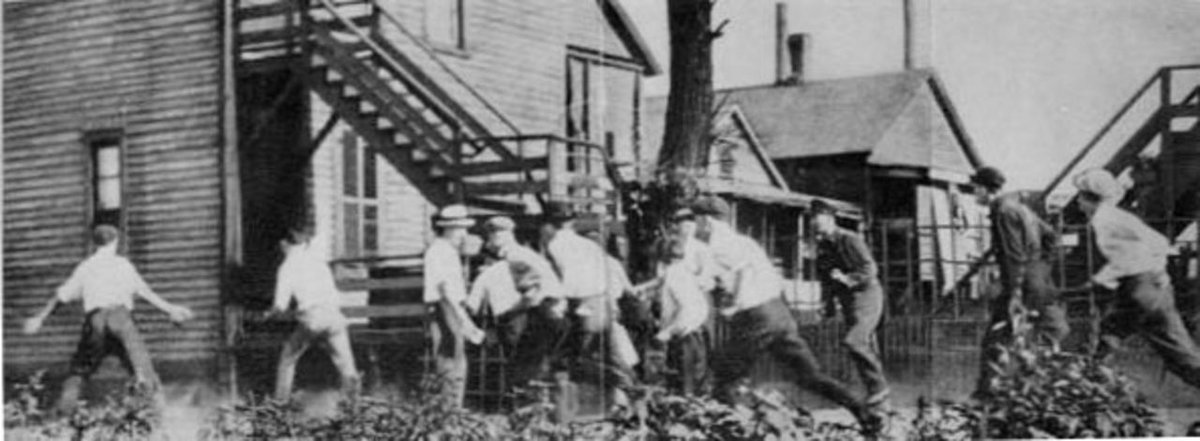
A white gang looking for African Americans during the Chicago Race Riot of 1919. This and a subsequent picture at The Crisis Magazine 1919 Vol 18 No. 6 is part of a series of the Chicago race riots of 1919.
The first pictures of the white gang chasing a victim are at and

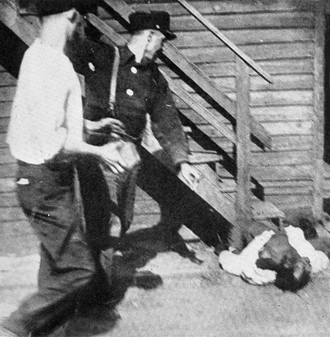
A fifth picture from the series;
an African-American man assaulted with stones during the Chicago Race Riot. Note that this picture was printed backwards-see https://archive.org/details/negroinchicagost00chic/page/n47/mode/1up – see corrected version at
A subsequent 6th and 7th picture show the arrival of police officers and the victim.

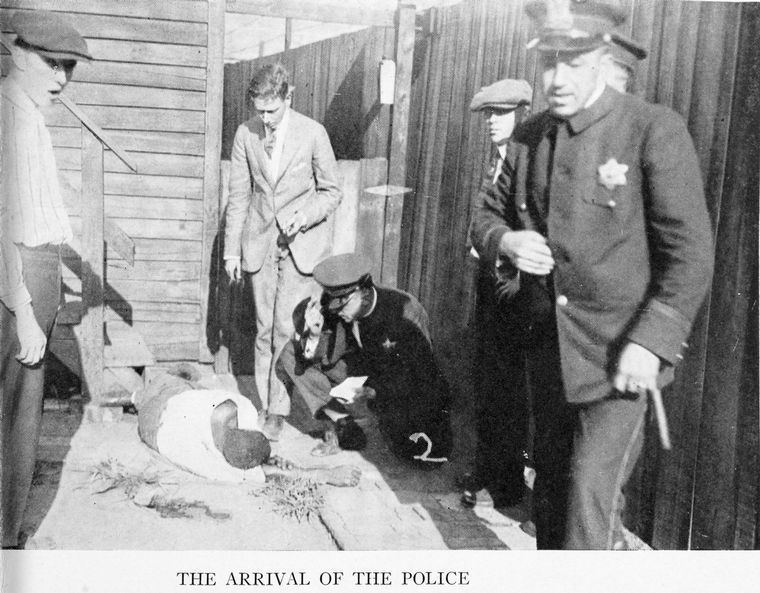
The Arrival of The Police

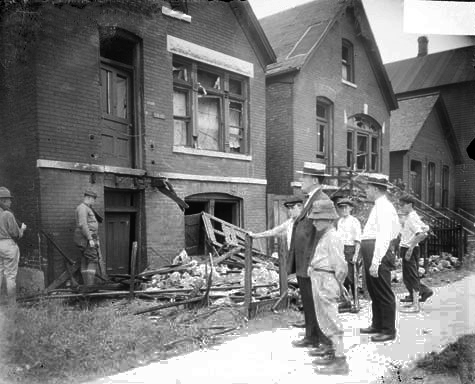
White men and boys standing
in front of a vandalized house.

=== Coroner's inquest ===
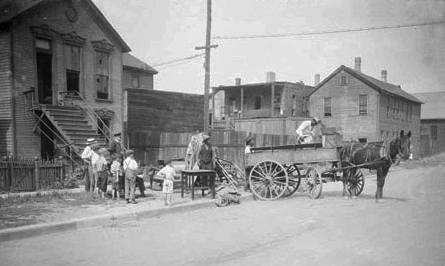
Three African-American men moving furniture.

The Cook County Coroner's Office took 70 day sessions, 20 night sessions and 450 witnesses examinations to collect evidence about the riots. Its report stated that, on July 27, 1919, Eugene Williams, an African-American youth, drifted towards an informally segregated beach on the South Side while holding onto a railroad tie. He was subsequently hit by a stone as a white man threw rocks at him and other African Americans to drive them away from the white part of the 29th Street beach in the city's Douglas community on the South Side. A witness recalled seeing a single white male standing on a breakwater 75 feet (22.9 m) from the raft of the African Americans and throwing rocks at them. Williams was struck in the forehead. He then panicked, lost his grip on the railroad tie, and drowned. The assailant ran toward 29th Street, where a different fight already had started when African Americans tried to use a section of the beach there, in defiance of its tacit segregation.

The rioting escalated when a white police officer refused to arrest the man who threw the stone at Williams. He instead arrested an African American on a white man's complaint of some minor offense. Anger over the arrest, coupled with Williams's death and rumors among both communities, escalated into five days of rioting. Most casualties were African Americans and most of the property damage was inflicted in African-American neighborhoods. Historians noted, "South Side youth gangs, including the Hamburg Athletic Club, were later found to have been among the primary instigators of the racial violence. For weeks, in the spring and summer of 1919, they had been anticipating, even eagerly awaiting, a race riot" and, "On several occasions, they themselves had endeavored to precipitate one, and now that racial violence threatened to become generalized and unrestrained throughout Chicago, they were set to exploit the chaos."

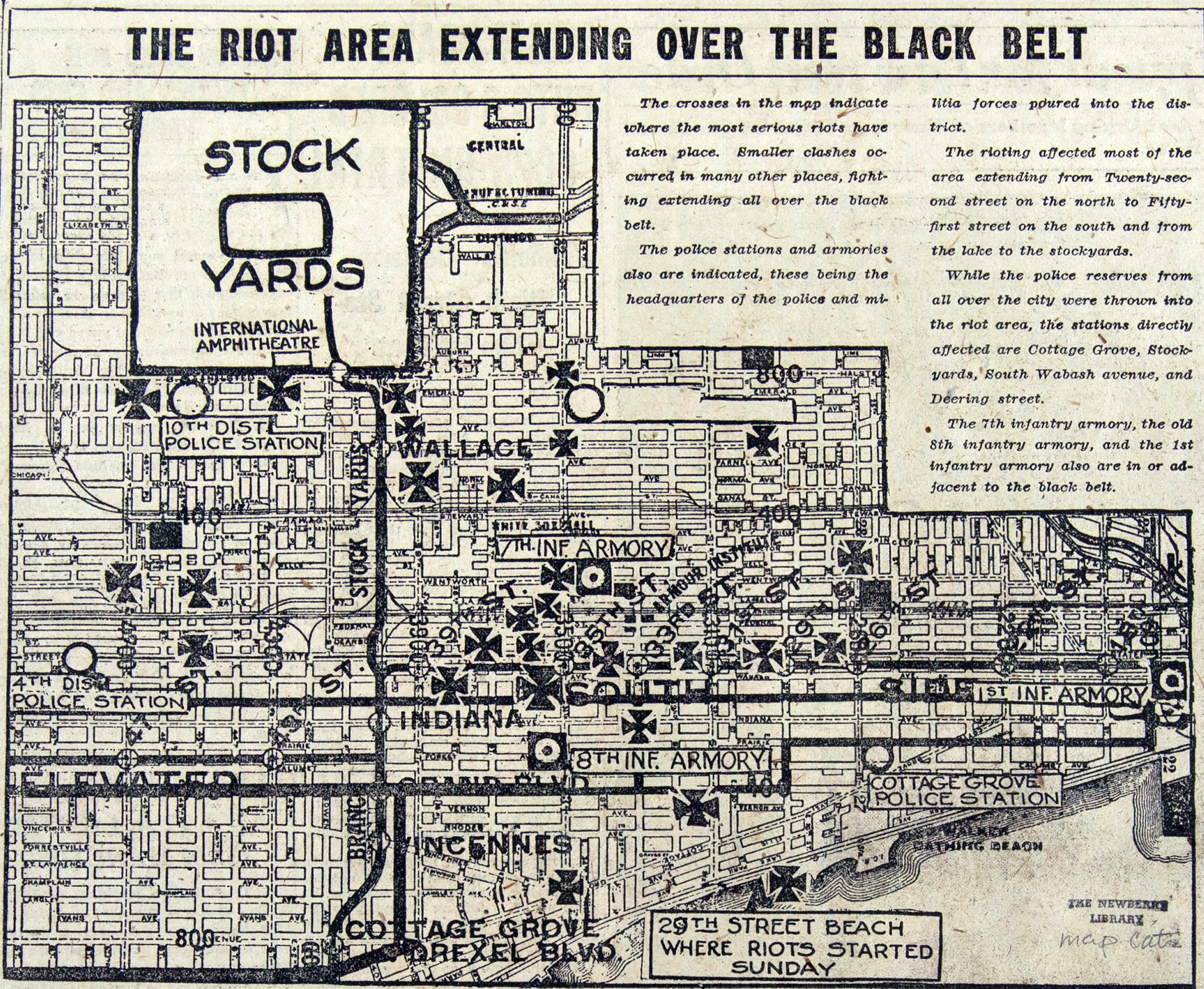
A map of the riot-affected areas on the South Side of Chicago, with the large Union Stock Yards visible, and the then 29th Street beach at lower center-right. North is to the right.

Early reports detailed injuries to police officers and a Chicago fireman. One African-American policeman, John Simpson, was killed during the riot by persons unknown. The conduct of the white police force was criticized during and after the riots. State's Attorney Maclay Hoyne accused the police of arresting African-American rioters, while refusing to arrest white rioters. Hoyne began bringing the cases involving only African Americans to the sitting grand jury to be charged, causing the jurors to walk out. "What the ------ is the matter with the state's attorney? Hasn’t he got any white cases to present?" a juror complained. The jury then deferred hearing evidence of all cases against African Americans until whites were also charged. Similarly a judge lectured police: "I want to explain to you officers that these colored people could not have been rioting among themselves. Bring me some white prisoners." Roaming gangs of Bridgeport whites, mostly Irish, perpetrated much of the violence. Although the local newspapers carried accounts of African Americans setting fires, "later the office of State Fire Marshal Gamber proved conclusively that the fires were not caused by Blacks, but by whites." The New York Times coverage of the riot clearly conveyed that whites were responsible for coordinated large-scale arson against black areas and for numerous mob attacks. With early police failures to arrest whites (other than for Williams's death), most deaths were not prosecuted, and only two white Chicagoans were ultimately convicted of murder. The one man prosecuted for Williams's death was acquitted.

=== Ramifications and later investigations ===
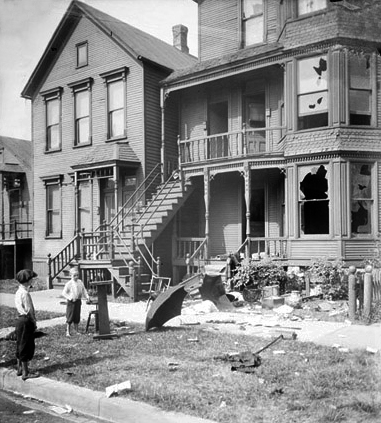
House with broken windows and debris in front yard

The rioting impacted Chicago's economy. Low-income areas, such as tenement housing, were especially impacted as areas of possible riots. Some of the South Side's industry was closed during the riot. Businesses in the Loop also were affected by closure of the street cars. Many workers stayed away from affected areas. At the Union Stock Yard, one of Chicago's largest employers, all 15,000 African-American workers initially were expected to return to work on Monday, August 4, 1919. But after arson near white employees' homes near the Stock Yards on August 3, the management banned African-American employees from the stockyards in fear of further rioting. Governor Lowden noted his opinion that the troubles were related to labor issues rather than race. Nearly one-third of the African-American employees were non-union, and were resented by union employees for that reason. African-American workers were kept out of the stockyards for ten days after the end of the riot because of continued unrest. On August 8, 1919, about 3,000 non-union African Americans showed up for work under protection of special police, deputy sheriffs, and militia. The white union employees threatened to strike unless such security forces were discontinued. Their main grievance against African Americans was that they were non-union and had been used by management as strikebreakers in earlier years. Many African Americans fled the city as a result of the riots and damage.

Illinois Attorney General Edward Brundage and State's Attorney Hoyne gathered evidence to prepare for a grand-jury investigation. The stated intention was to pursue all perpetrators and to seek the death penalty as necessary. On August 4, 1919, seventeen indictments against African Americans were handed down.

Richard J. Daley was a member, and years later was elected president, of the Hamburg Athletic Club in Bridgeport. Daley served as Chicago's mayor from 1955 to 1976. In his long political career, he never confirmed or denied involvement in the riots.

In 1922, Illinois Governor Frank Lowden appointed a commission of six whites and six African Americans to discover the true roots of the riots. The commission's final report, submitted on January 1, 1921, and primarily written by Charles S. Johnson, claimed that returning soldiers from World War I not receiving their original jobs and homes instigated the riots.

In 1930, Mayor William Hale Thompson, a flamboyant Republican, invoked the riot in a misleading pamphlet urging African Americans to vote against the Republican nominee, Rep. Ruth Hanna McCormick, in the United States Senate race for her late husband's seat. She was the widow of Sen. Joseph Medill McCormick as well as the sister-in-law of Chicago Tribune publisher Robert Rutherford McCormick. The McCormicks were a powerful Chicago family, whom Thompson opposed.

President Woodrow Wilson pronounced white participants the instigators of the prolonged riots in Chicago and Washington, D.C. As a result, he attempted to promote greater racial harmony through the promotion of voluntary organizations and through the enactment of legislative improvements by Congress. Wilson did not reverse the policy of racial segregation within the federal bureaucracy imposed at the beginning of his first term in office, however. The Chicago Race Riot of 1919 shocked the nation and raised awareness of the problems that African Americans faced every day in the early 20th century United States.

=== Commemorations ===
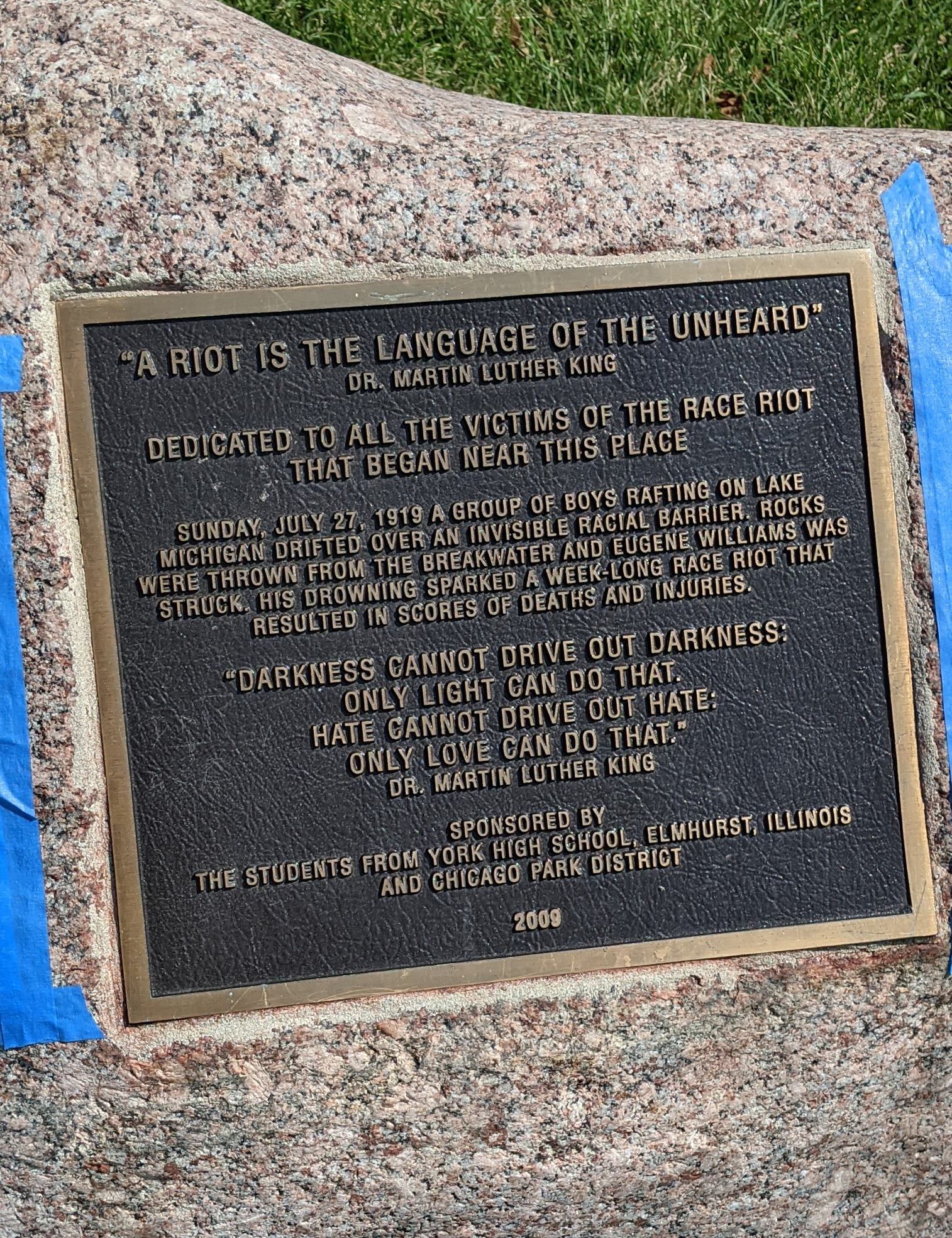
This plaque, installed in 2009 and located at 29th Street and the Chicago lakefront, commemorates the Race Riot of 1919.

Float, a public art performance conducted by Jefferson Pinder in 2019, commemorated the death by stoning of Eugene Williams, the first victim at 29th Street Beach, who accidentally had floated into the racially segregated area of Lake Michigan. In it, an interracial group of participants were arranged on the water, floating near a Chicago beach.

In 2019, Eve Ewing published a collection of poetry on the Chicago Race Riots of 1919, called 1919.

A boulder at 29th Street near the lakefront, with a plaque installed in 2009, commemorates the Race Riots. (29th Street Beach no longer exists, as land reclamation has extended the lakeshore further into the lake)

The Chicago Race Riots Commemoration Project (CRR19), launched in 2019, is working to install 38 markers around the South Side to pay tribute to the 38 lives that were lost. The first five markers were unveiled at a ceremony in June 2024. As of November 2025, nineteen markers have been installed, each a glass brick handmade by participants in Project FIRE, Firebird Community Arts’ rehabilitative program that enrolls young survivors of gun violence in glassblowing classes, and each brick incorporating a historical photograph relevant to those being remembered as well as an image of a Project FIRE creator, and each brick is encased in a colored concrete frame. CRR19 also hosts an annual bike tour in late July that explores the history of the Chicago race riots of 1919 and the city's legacy of residential segregation.

In 2021, a grave marker was erected in Lincoln Cemetery at the previously unmarked grave of teenager Eugene Williams, the first victim at 29th Street Beach, whose death touched off the days of rioting.

== See also ==
- List of incidents of civil unrest in the United States
- List of homicides in Illinois § Lynchings and race riots
- Mass racial violence in the United States
