= Richard DeBaptiste =

American journalist

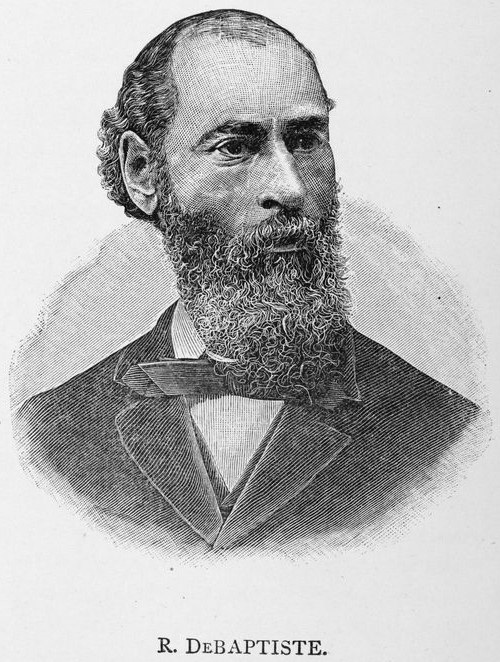
- Image of DeBaptiste from 1887
- Born: November 11, 1831; Fredericksburg, Virginia, U.S.
- Died: April 21, 1901 (aged 69); Chicago, Illinois, U.S.
- Occupation: minister
- Children: Georgia Mabel DeBaptiste

Religious life
- Religion: Baptist

Richard DeBaptiste (November 11, 1831 – April 21, 1901) was a Baptist minister in Chicago, Illinois. Before the abolition of slavery, he was an abolitionist and worked with his close relative, George DeBaptiste in the Underground Railroad, mainly in Detroit, Michigan. His ministry took him to Ohio, and in 1863, to Olivet Baptist Church in Chicago. He was a leader in the local and national Baptist community. He also was a journalist, serving as editor or correspondent to various newspapers and journals.

== Early life ==
Richard DeBaptiste was born free in Fredericksburg, Virginia on November 11, 1831, to free people of color William and Eliza DeBaptiste. He was educated in secret, first by a black man and then by a Scots-Irish man who had been a teacher in Scotland. His grandfather, John DeBaptiste, was in the American Revolutionary War and had been born on the island of St. Kitt's. His uncle, George DeBaptiste, fought for the US in the War of 1812. Richard had two brothers, George and Benjamin, who both took part in the American Civil War (1861–1865).

== Move to Detroit, Michigan ==
In 1846, the DeBaptiste family moved from Virginia to Detroit, Michigan in a pilgrimage of free blacks led by William DeBaptiste and Marie Louis More. There he continued his education under Richard Dillingham, a Quaker; and Reverend Samuel H. Davis, pastor of the Second Baptist Church of Detroit. His father and uncle were builders and general contractors, and Richard was trained in brick manufacturing, brick building, and plastering. In the west, his father worked in the grocery business, and Richard assisted. When this business failed, they resumed contracting work, with Richard as a partner. In Detroit and later in Ohio and Chicago, DeBaptiste worked to help fugitive slaves escape to Canada. He acted with George DeBaptiste (possibly his brother), a noted conductor of the Underground Railroad in Detroit.

After moving to Chicago, DeBaptiste also worked with noted abolitionists John and Mary Jones.

== Detroit and Mount Pleasant ==
DeBaptiste had converted to the Baptist religion in 1852 at the Second Baptist Church in Detroit under Reverends William P. Newman and D. G. Lett. He was immediately active at that church and taught at the Sunday School. Later he became ordained as a Baptist preacher.

DeBaptiste married Georgiana Brische of Cincinnati, Ohio in October 1855. She was the daughter of James and Louisa Brischo. The couple lived in Detroit until 1858, when they moved to Mount Pleasant, Hamilton County, Ohio. They had three children together. Georgiana died November 2, 1872. Their daughter, Georgia Mabel DeBaptiste (born November 24, 1867), became a noted journalist.

The widower DeBaptiste married again on July 13, 1885. His second wife, Mary E. Grant, died of tuberculosis, then often a fatal illness, in April 1886. They had no children. Lastly, he married Nellie Williams of Galesburg, Illinois on November 11, 1890.

== Chicago ==
In Mount Pleasant, DeBaptiste was licensed to preach and organized a Sunday School. He also preached at the Union Baptist Church in Cincinnati. DeBaptiste was ordained in April 1860 at Mount Pleasant, Ohio by a council called by the Union Baptist Church of Cincinnati. It consisted of five Baptist churches in Cincinnati and Lockland, Ohio. In addition to conducting his ministry, he taught public schools for black children in Springfield Township and Mount Pleasant for three years. Also, he organized and was pastor at a black Baptist church there from 1860 to 1863.

In August 1863, DeBaptiste was called to succeed Jesse Freeman Boulden as pastor of Olivet Baptist Church in Chicago. There he served nearly two decades until February 1882. James Alfred Dunn Podd was called to the office after him. During his service, DeBaptist baptized more than 1,700 people. He organized or planted several churches in Illinois, including the Second Baptist Church of Elgin, the Third Baptist Church of Aurora, the Baptist Church at St. Charles, and the Second Baptist Church of Evanston. Also in Chicago, he attended lectures for two years at the Morgan Park Theological Seminary, a part of the University of Chicago.

In 1869, he organized Illinois' first Colored Convention to fight for black civil rights.

DeBaptiste held numerous leadership positions in local and national Baptist organizations. He was elected corresponding secretary of the Wood River Association, serving from 1856 to 1887. He was elected recording secretary of the Northwestern and Southern Baptist convention in 1865 in St. Louis, Missouri. At the 1866 annual meeting, he was elected corresponding secretary. He was elected president of the consolidated American Baptist Missionary convention in Nashville, Tennessee in 1867 and reelected for the following four years, including in 1870 at Wilmington, North Carolina, although he did not attend. In 1870, he was elected president of the Baptist Free Mission Society, a white organization, at their meeting in Cincinnati. Also in 1870, he was elected corresponding secretary of the American Baptist National Convention, which met August 25–29 in St. Louis. In 1871 he did not attend the national convention, held in Brooklyn.

From 1872 to 1876, DeBaptiste attended the national convention and was elected president each of those years. At the 1877 meeting at Richmond, Virginia, DeBaptiste was elected corresponding secretary of the Foreign Mission department, a position he held for two years.

About this time, DeBaptiste also served as a trustee at Leland University. In 1881, he was elected corresponding secretary of the Baptist General Association of the Western States and Territories, and also held the position of treasurer of that group. In 1886 and 1887 he was elected corresponding secretary of the American National Baptist Convention, and elected convention statistician at numerous later conventions. In his various positions, DeBaptiste worked for integration and black rights and called for the condemnation of "black laws". His efforts contributed to the repeal of black laws in Illinois.

In 1886, DeBaptiste was a leader at the American National Baptist Convention called by William J. Simmons. A major issue facing the group was unifying black Baptists. The convention featured notable presentations by James T. White and Solomon T. Clanton.

He worked closely with Illinois' first black state legislator, John W. E. Thomas. He was also president of the Cook County Building and Loan Association of Chicago, an African-American group organized to promote black business.

DeBaptiste also published articles in numerous journals. Following the work of founder Ferdinand Lee Barnett, he was co-editor with Reverend G. C. Booth at the Chicago Conservator. From September 1884 to December 1885, he was editor of the Western Herald. He was corresponding editor of Reverend H. H. White's Monitor, based in St. Louis, Missouri, and was corresponding editor of Reverend R. L. Perry's National Monitor out of Brooklyn.

== Honors ==
- He was granted a Doctor of Divinity on May 17, 1887, by the University of Louisville.

== Death and honors ==
In 1887, he was given an honorary doctorate of divinity by Simmons College of Kentucky.

He died April 21, 1901, in Chicago.
