= Boulden =

Boulden is a surname. Notable people with the surname include:

- Amy Boulden (born 1993), Welsh professional golfer
- Jesse Freeman Boulden (1820–1899), US Baptist pastor and politician
- Wood Boulden (1811–1876), US lawyer, plantation owner, and politician

Others with the name include:

- Thomas Boulden Thompson (1766–1828), British naval officer

== See also ==
- Bouldon
