= Zelia (given name) =

Feminine given name

Zelia is a feminine given name. Notable people named Zelia or Zélia include:

- Zealia Bishop (1897–1968), sometimes spelled Zelia, American short story writer
- Zelia N. Breaux (1880–1956), African-American music instructor and musician
- Zélia Cardoso de Mello (born 1953), Brazilian economist, Minister of the Economy from 1990 to 1991
- Zélia Duncan (born 1964), Brazilian singer and composer
- Zélia Gattai (1916–2008), Brazilian photographer, memoirist, novelist and author of children's literature
- Zelia Hoffman (1867–1929), American horticulturalist and British politician
- Zelia Nuttall (1857–1933), American archaeologist and anthropologist
- Zelia Ball Page (1850–1937), African-American teacher, first matron of Langston University and mother of Zelia Breaux
- Zelia Peet Ruebhausen (1914–1990), American civic leader and policy advisor
- Zelia Trebelli-Bettini (1836–1892), also known as Zelia Gilbert, French operatic mezzo-soprano
