= James Alfred Dunn Podd =

Baptist preacher (1855–1886)

- Born: March 16, 1855; Nevis, West Indies
- Died: December 23, 1886 (aged 31); Jacksonville, Florida, U.S.
- Occupation(s): minister, civil servant, educator, journalist

Religious life
- Religion: Baptist

James Alfred Dunn Podd (March 16, 1855 – December 23, 1886) was a leading Baptist preacher in Chicago, Illinois. Podd was born in Nevis, West Indies on March 16, 1855. Podd's father was a leading minister in the Wesleyan Methodist Church. As a boy, he and his family moved to the Island of St. Christopher. Podd went to England for his studies. Upon completion, he returned to the West Indies where he received a government appointment in the department of education. He rose to the position of superintendent of schools for the island. He also worked as an editor of a journal on the island. When his mother died, he felt called to another path and moved to Canada, where he entered the ministry of the British Methodist Episcopal Church. He left this church, converting to the Baptist religion and becoming pastor at a Baptist church in St. Catharines, Ontario. In 1879, he moved to London, Ontario to preach at a church there.

In December 1881 he was asked by Olivet Baptist Church in Chicago to succeed Richard DeBaptiste as its pastor, and he moved on February 1, 1882. In February 1883 he moved to Bethesda Baptist Church on Chicago's South Side. Podd was charged a number of times with fathering children outside of marriage, but was always exonerated. Under Podd's leadership, the congregation built a chapel on 34th and Butterfield. Podd was very active in Baptist church leadership and participated and presented at Baptist National Conventions. His health failed in 1886 and he spent some time on the East Coast hopeful that the sea air would help him recover. In late 1886 he was in Florida on a trip to recover his health when he died on December 23. He was unmarried.
