= Zelia zonata =

Scientific classification
- Kingdom: Animalia
- Phylum: Arthropoda
- Class: Insecta
- Order: Diptera
- Family: Tachinidae
- Subfamily: Dexiinae
- Tribe: Dexiini
- Genus: Zelia
- Species: Z. zonata

Binomial name
- Zelia zonata (Coquillett, 1895)

Synonyms
- Gymnodexia zonata Coquillett, 1895

Species of fly

Zelia zonata is a species of bristle fly in the family Tachinidae.

== Distribution ==
Canada, United States.
