= William J. Thompkins =

American physician

William J Thompkins
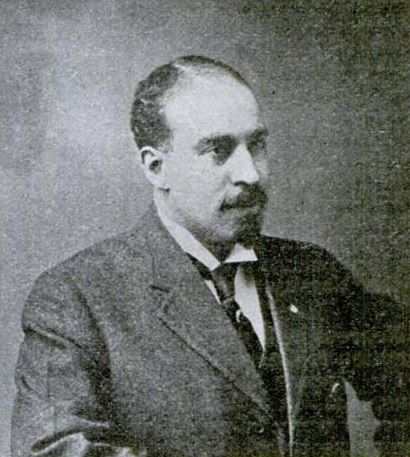

Recorder of Deeds for the District of Columbia
- In office March 1934 – 1944
- Preceded by: Jefferson Coege

Personal details
- Born: July 5, 1884 Jefferson City, Missouri
- Died: August 4, 1944 (aged 60) Washington, D.C.
- Party: Democratic
- Spouse: Jessie Embry
- Education: Lincoln University, University of Colorado, Howard University
- Profession: Physician, Civil Servant

William J. Thompkins (July 5, 1884 - August 4, 1944) was a physician and health administrator in Kansas City, Missouri and served as Recorder of Deeds for the District of Columbia from 1934 to his death. He first received national notice when he challenged Jim Crow Laws in Oklahoma in Federal Courts in the early 1910s. He was a successful physician and was appointed superintendent of the Old General Hospital in Kansas City, Missouri and the Assistant Commissioner of Health in that City. He wrote an influential study of the relationship between housing conditions and tuberculosis in blacks and was active in Democratic politics which garnered him attention at the highest levels of the party. He became president of the National Negro Democratic Association and was a major campaigner for the Democratic Presidential Candidates in campaigns from 1928 until 1940, gaining national level party appointments in 1932, 1936, and 1940. In 1934 he was appointed Recorder of Deeds for Washington, DC. This position was the highest federal appointment given to an African American, a tradition which was started with Frederick Douglass' appointment to the position in 1881.

== Personal life and education ==
William J. Thompkins was born July 5, 1884, in Jefferson City, Missouri. He graduated from Lincoln University in Missouri, the University of Colorado, and the Howard University School of Medicine. While at Lincoln University he worked as a hotel bellboy to help pay his fees. In 1905, he took an internship at the Freedmen's Hospital in Washington DC. After that, he opened a practice in Kansas City, Missouri.

Thompkins married Jessie F. Embry and had two daughters, Helen and Marian. Thompkins died August 4, 1944 at the Freedmen Hospital in Washington after six months confinement to the hospital with a stomach ailment. His funeral was at the Metropolitan AME Church.

== Career ==
=== Kansas City health practitioner and administrator ===
In the early 1910s, Thompkins refused demands to leave a whites-only Pullman car at Vinita, Oklahoma while on a train from Kansas City to McAlester, Oklahoma. Thompkins was arrested for disturbance and fined $15. Thompkins challenged the action and the case reached the United States Circuit Court of Appeals where the court affirmed the decision of the Kansas City District Court not to award Thompkins damages on January 28, 1914.

He was a noted orator. In August 1911, Thompkins gave a speech at the National Negro Educators Congress in Denver, Colorado about the progress of blacks in America. He noted three views on the best way forward for blacks: industrialism associated with Booker T. Washington, higher education associated with Inman E. Page, and agriculturalism, and said that there is no single pathway to progress but that as each of these was important for white people, so to must they all be important for blacks. In 1928, he founded the newspaper, the Kansas City American, which was the first black Democratic Newspaper in the city. In addition to serving as managing editor, he also applied for a license to put a black-formatted radio station on the air, in January 1930. Had he been successful, he would have been radio's first black owner. Unfortunately, his application was subsequently turned down by the Federal Radio Commission in late February.

In late 1914, Thompkins was appointed superintendent of the Old General Hospital (Negro department) which served black and Mexican patients in Kansas City (also called General Hospital No. 2) the first black man to receive this appointment. His performance in that role was exceptional, lifting its grade from Class D to Class A before leaving in 1922. Over the next five years he practiced in Tulsa, Oklahoma City, Okmulgee, and Muskogee, all in Oklahoma. In 1926 he returned to Kansas City where he was appointed Assistant Commissioner of Health of Kansas City in the department of Hygiene and Communicable Disease, the first black man to hold this position. In this position, Thompkins wrote a study which pressed for an improvement of housing conditions in the face of high prevalence of tuberculosis in Kansas City blacks. His survey was used as a model by the American Public Health Commission and the housing plan he developed in this work was presented by President Herbert Hoover to the National Housing Commission in 1930.

=== National politics ===
In 1928, Thompkins became involved in the 1928 Presidential campaign, supporting Democratic nominee Alfred E. Smith, who would lose to Herbert Hoover in November. Thompkins was a leader of the National Colored Democratic Convention. In 1932, Thompkins was in charge of the Democratic campaign among blacks for all states west of the Mississippi River and was president of the National Colored Democratic Convention. His efforts for the Democrats were rewarded and Thomkins was appointed to the office of Recorder of Deeds for the District of Columbia by President Franklin Roosevelt in March 1934, succeeding Jefferson Coege.

William J. Thompkins visits Franklin Roosevelt in his role as official of the Improved Benevolent and Protective Order of Elks of the World to invite Roosevelt to attend a parade, August 27, 1935.

In the 1936 campaign, leadership of black Democrats was contested between Thompkins, Julian D. Rainey, and Robert L. Vann. Thompkins was appointed adviser on colored affairs to Democratic Party Chairman James A. Farley. On Friday, January 13, 1939, Thompkins was among a group who became the first blacks to dine in the private dining room of the Speaker of the House of Representatives (who was William B. Bankhead) in the capital building. In 1939, the Hatch Act prohibited federal employees from political campaigns, and Thompkins was the sole black government official to be issued an exception. Thompkins played an important role in the 1940 Missouri senatorial election, being named general chairman of the Negro Division of Harry S. Truman's campaign.

In 1941, A. Philip Randolph, president of the Brotherhood of Sleeping Car Porters, and Walter White, executive secretary of the National Association for the Advancement of Colored People planned a march on Washington for July 1 to oppose discrimination in the Federal Government. As the day of the march approached, President Roosevelt made an effort to counter the protest, enacting a number of policies to appease Randolph and White. Roosevelt was supported by a number of Democratic African-Americans working for the government, particularly Thompkins and Congressman Arthur W. Mitchell who worked to stop the march, which did not occur.

Thompkins held a number of other important positions during his life. He was the National Director of Health of the Improved Benevolent and Protective Order of Elks of the World. He also founded the National Negro Democratic Association. He was a member of the Board of Trustees of Lincoln University, a vice president of the National Medical Association, president of the National Colored Democreatic Association, a member of the Sigma Pi Phi medical society, a member of the Mu-So-Lit Club, a Mason, and held a reserve commission in the Army Medical Corps.
