= Zelia ruficauda =

Scientific classification
- Kingdom: Animalia
- Phylum: Arthropoda
- Class: Insecta
- Order: Diptera
- Family: Tachinidae
- Subfamily: Dexiinae
- Tribe: Dexiini
- Genus: Zelia
- Species: Z. ruficauda

Binomial name
- Zelia ruficauda (Reinhard, 1946)

Synonyms
- Minthozelia ruficauda Reinhard, 1946

Species of fly

Zelia ruficauda is a species of fly in the family Tachinidae.

== Distribution ==
United States
