= Tenement housing in Chicago =

Chicago Photographed from Ray Knabenshue's Dirigible Air Ship, 1914

Tenement housing in Chicago was established in the late 19th and into the early 20th centuries. A majority of tenement complexes in Chicago were constructed in the interest of using land space and boosting the economy. These tenements were built quite tall, often exceeding 3 stories, to accommodate as many low-income tenants as possible. This was possible as Chicago had not set a height limit to residential buildings, allowing landlords to create towering, cramped buildings with many rooms to generate as much revenue as possible. By the beginning of the 20th century, tenement housing in Chicago was generally divided based on ethnicity, including sections such as Polish, black, Italian, and Greek ethnic neighborhoods.

As Chicago became continually more urbanized, tenement houses rapidly grew in frequency and population density. This exacerbated both the deterioration of living conditions and the spread of diseases throughout Chicago. By the mid 20th century, many groups including government officials looked to enact tenement reforms, by either improving living conditions or transforming the complexes into more livable areas such as courtyard apartments. These reforms were brought out to improve cleanliness and the overall standard of living.

Today, the urbanization and city planning of Chicago still includes echoes of the previously established tenement houses, as the city includes divisions along racial, ethnic, and income-based lines. In this sense, Chicago continues to struggle with discrepancies in wealth and historical racial migration in regard to housing.

== Tenement Housing in Chicago ==
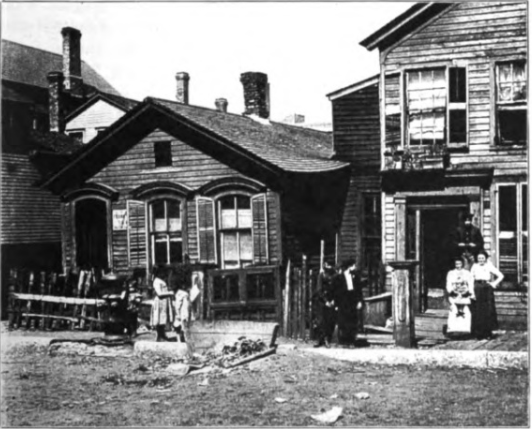
Early Chicago Tenement House

=== Size and Functionality ===
Tenement houses in Chicago by the early 1900s mainly comprised either complexes or single houses. Within these houses or complexes, single rooms would be rented out to individuals or families. These rooms were very overcrowded with people, allotting only about 2 square yards per-person on average in some houses. In many cases the houses were not uninhabitable; however, overcrowding complicated living conditions. In 1917, one study illustrated that on average over 6 people occupied a single room of tenement houses. This generally led to complications with available space and even compromised air quality. Rooms were often unable to satisfy the various needs of tenants, as they had little space to spare. As a result, inhabitants of tenement houses often washed clothes, cleaned themselves, and generally spent time outside.

== Health ==
=== Living conditions ===
Chicago tenements inhabited in the late 19th and early 20th centuries were limited to bare necessities and were often overcrowded. Even so, often bare necessities were not present in Chicago tenements, furthering the poor quality of life and sanitary conditions. By the beginning of the 20th century, housing reformers noted that "'bath and toilet' rooms in the homes of large numbers of impoverished Chicagoans were either nonexistent or in dangerously defective condition." As a result, sicknesses were widespread among these areas, and many were unable to perform basic tasks in their homes. The conditions of these tenements ultimately led to the creation of many housing and sanitary reforms such as in the 1890s and 1900, as public health concerns grew increasingly alarming.

=== Disease ===
Tenement Building "E", Langley Avenue, Chicago, Cook County, IL

As a result of the poor sanitation, size, and overall living conditions of the Chicago tenements, disease was able to spread rapidly. Diseases such as tuberculosis and scarlet fever were especially prevalent among Chicago tenements during the early 20th century. The spread was further exacerbated by overcrowding, poor sanitation, and the intimacy of tenement inhabitants. Although other areas of Chicago were also impacted by outbreaks of Tuberculosis in 1901 and throughout the 20th century, Chicago tenements were disproportionately affected.

Those that contracted diseases during the early 20th century in Chicago tenements especially faced difficulties, as due to their general poverty they were unable to either cure or sustainably treat their diseases. Despite attempts by politicians to reform the health conditions, quality of inspection, and general quality of tenement areas, sanitary reform began to crumble as early as 1890. Settlement workers and politicians justified this in stating that the poor conditions were solely linked to low wages and irregular employment. This proved to be detrimental for those living in tenements, as they received little state or federal support to improve their living conditions. Those living in tenements continued to remain in run down areas, unable to escape from the disease spreading around them.

== Demographics ==
=== Black Americans ===
During the second half of the 19th century and early into the 20th century a small number of wealthy and educated black Americans were present in Chicago. These communities were peppered between white suburbs and upper-class neighborhoods throughout the city. Although segregation was present, the black American population was not yet centered in the poor racial communities and tenement housing located in Chicago's south side. However, this changed during the 1910s, with the start of the first World War. Due to the influx of working class black immigrants into the city, rising from 2 to 5 percent of the cities total population during the 1920s, white residents began to advocate for stricter policies of segregation. The black population began to be zoned out of the wealthy white neighborhoods and began to purchase property the south side which became known as "black belt". This area became the racial center for blacks in the city and would later develop into the lower-income housed, majority African American area of the city. As a result of these policies and purchasing patterns, Chicago become one of the most racialized cities in the North.

During the 1910s and 1920s housing conditions for blacks were dismal. Many were crowded far beyond the legal limit and were built hap hazardously, yet black tenants were paying far more for rent than their white counterparts in the other slums of the city. There were also not enough areas for the population of black migrates to find housing, which contributed to the over crowded and unsanitary conditions in the "black belt" housing. Jobs were also scarce for the residents of the "black belt" slums and many were not able to find work due to the institutionalized segregation laws of Chicago. Due to these difficult conditions, conflict between the African American population and other ethnic and immigrant groups was common and culminated during this era with the Race Riot of 1919.

The riot, which primarily pinned the black and polish communities against each other, was brutal with both sides contributing to various acts of savagery. Each group fought, using guerilla warfare tactics and a series of bombings, to "hold the line" and protect the neighborhoods where each group lived. As a result of these riots black stereotypes were formed in the minds of many of Chicago's ethnic minorities ad led to the believe that the goal of African Americans was to take over all the neighborhoods within the slums of Chicago. For the next few decades the memory of the 1919 Riot would propel Jim Crow laws in the city and crushed black aspirations for better housing in affluent communities.

=== Italian-Americans ===
Italian Americans have been part of Chicago communities since the incorporation of the city. Although the population of Italians in the city began as a rather small minority, with the influx of immigration during the 1890s to 1920s, many Italian communities began to appear throughout the city. One of the most famous was known as "Little Sicily", located on the north side of Chicago. By 1910, there were around 25,000 Italian and Sicilian immigrants living in city, most of which were from poorer southern Italy. Many immigrated to the city using the chain immigration system, where families or communities would send one or two people to the United States, where they would find work and housing, typically through an Italian broker, before the rest of the family followed. This contributed to the overcrowded and harsh living conditions for Chicago's Italian residents.

The housing in "Little Sicily" and other Italian communities was in a frightful state. It was located in an area between the north and south side of the city, which was known for being a place of abject poverty. The residents lived in old, overcrowded three or four-story buildings, which would often sink into the ground over time. Most were forced to pay high prices for low quality housing. Although, the area which they resided was surrounded by factories, most Italian immigrants did not want to work in industrial plants, instead choosing to work in rail or construction, who were paid less than their industrial counterparts. This led to even more overcrowding within the housing complex due to families moving in together to afford rent. Even though the residents did not work in the factories, the housing for many Italians were surrounded by them one side and with the river located on the other. This created an almost constant layer of smoke and air pollution which led to an influx of lung related diseases for the residents.

As a result of poverty and conflict between populations from different parts of Italy, crime became a major problem in "Little Sicily". From 1910 to 1920 there was the rise of a group known as the Black Hand, a group which was known for exhorting money from the wealthier Italian immigrants. After 1920 and the rise of prohibition, bootlegging become common in the neighborhood. The bootlegging industry led to mob violence in the area, mostly between the Aiello and Capone families. This led to the destruction of thousands of dollars of property destruction and dozens of deaths among the Italian populations.
