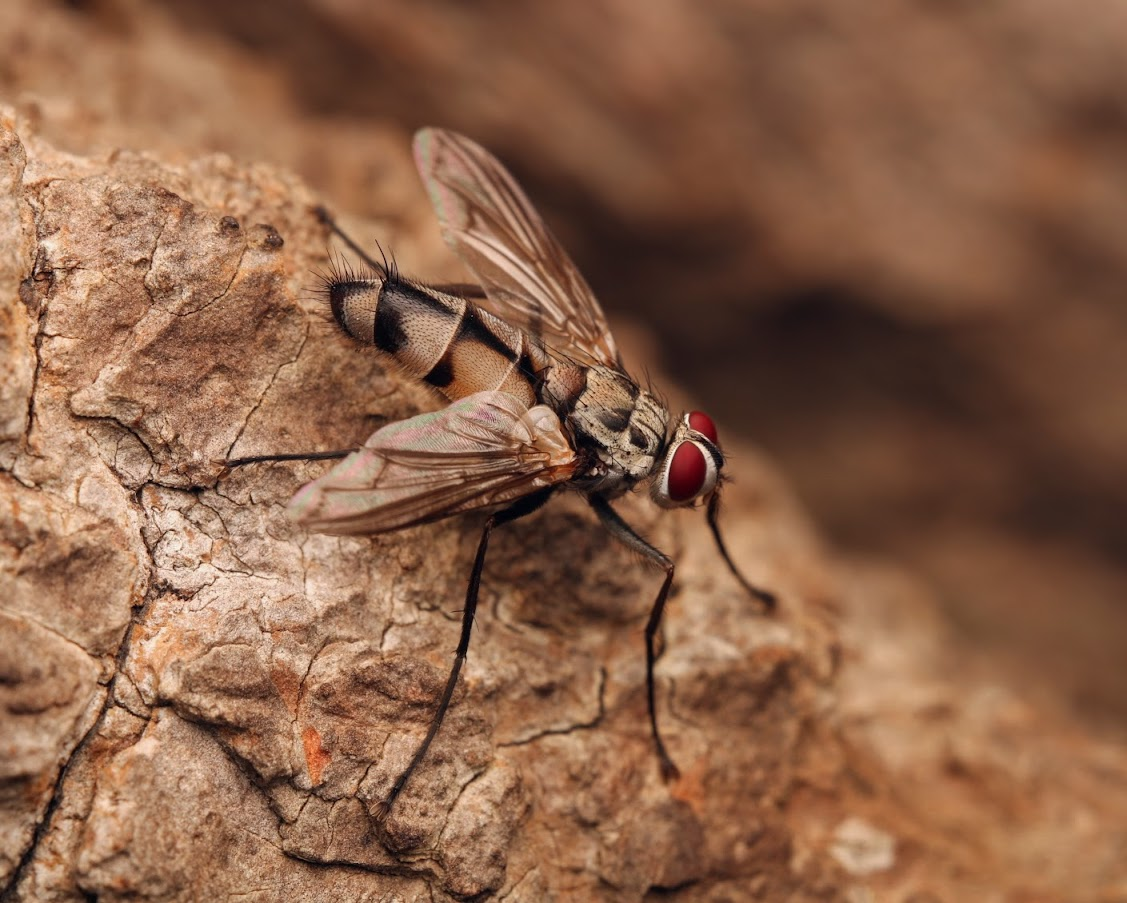

Scientific classification
- Kingdom: Animalia
- Phylum: Arthropoda
- Clade: Pancrustacea
- Class: Insecta
- Order: Diptera
- Family: Tachinidae
- Subfamily: Dexiinae
- Tribe: Dexiini
- Genus: Zelia
- Species: Z. vertebrata

Binomial name
- Zelia vertebrata (Say, 1829)

Synonyms
- Dexia gracilis Wiedemann, 1830; Dexia vertebrata Say, 1829; Zelia rostrata Robineau-Desvoidy, 1830

= Zelia vertebrata =

Species of fly

Zelia vertebrata is a species of bristle fly in the family Tachinidae. It is a long-bodied fly with strong abdominal bristles and a distinctive abdominal pattern that resembles vertebrae. It has a widespread North American range, with records stretching from east to west from Washington to Maine, north to south from Québec to Florida. Its larval stage parasitizes beetles. It is most active during the day.

== Biology ==
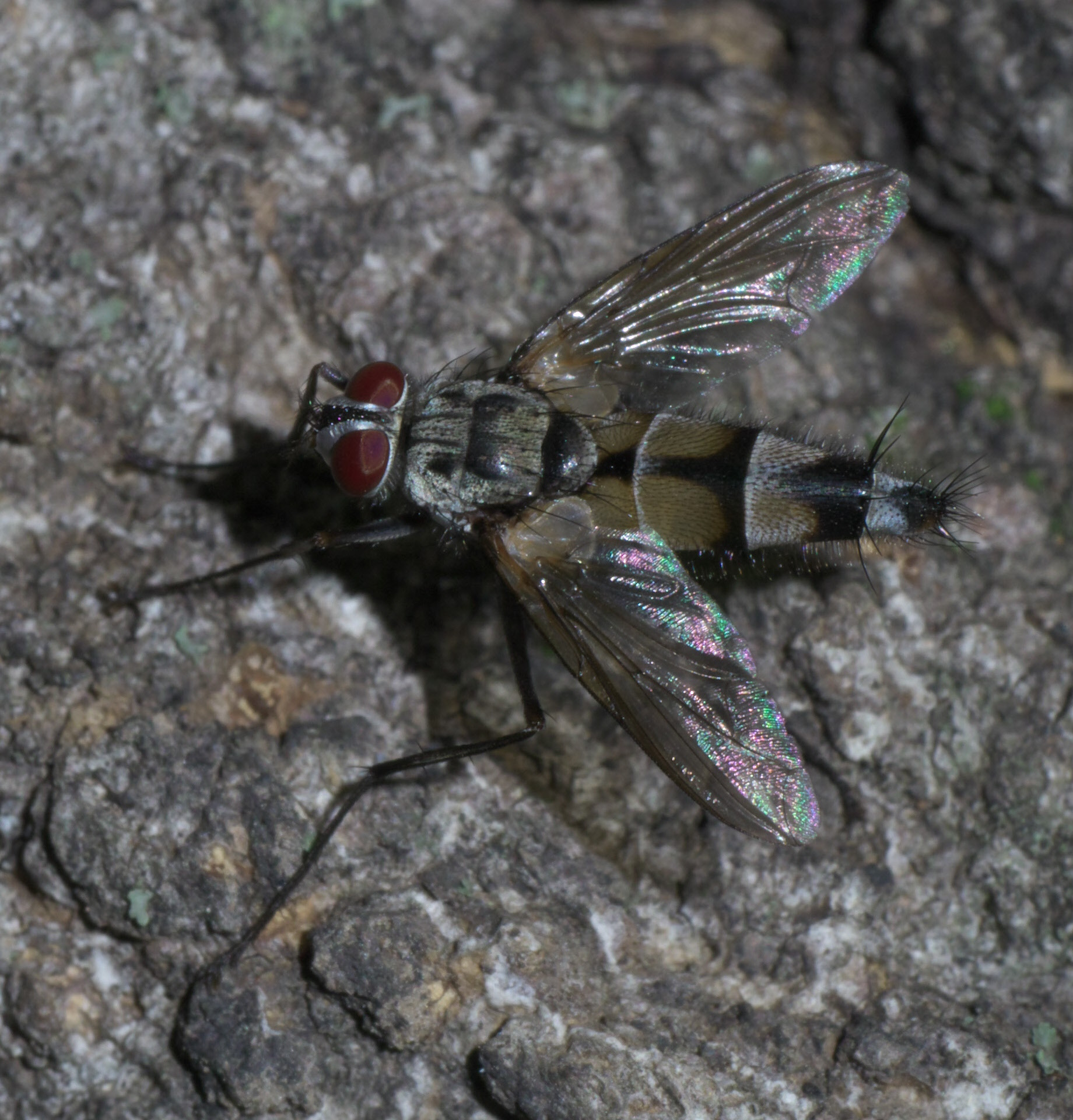

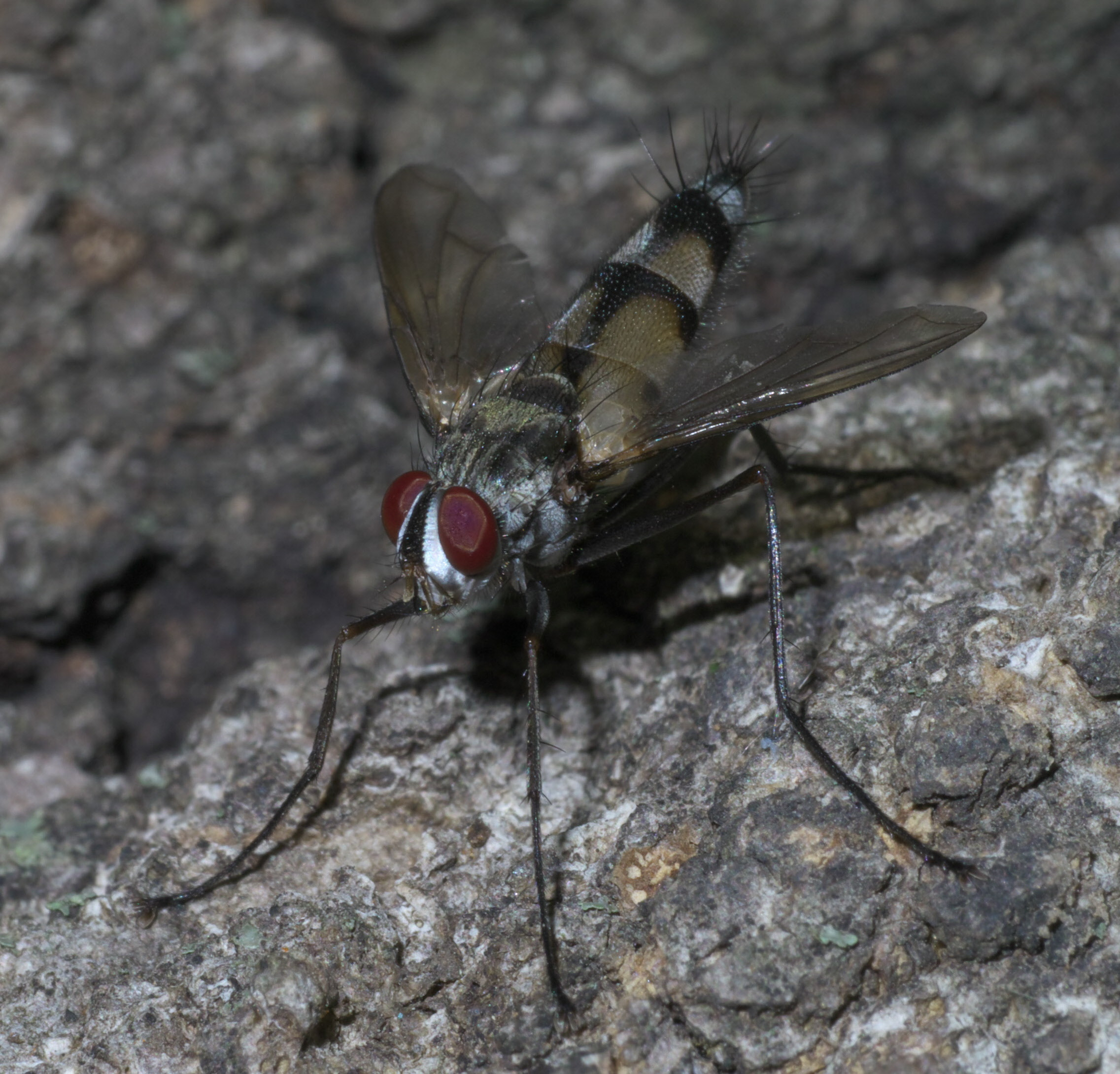

Zelia vertebrata is a generalist parasitoid, targeting beetle larvae in the families Passalidae, Scarabaeidae, Tenebrionidae, and Cerambycidae. In 1948, Mangrum conducted the most thorough examination of host-parasite interaction of this species, finding that gravid female Zelia vertebrata give birth to live larvae instead of eggs near the entrances of host larval tunnels. These worm-like parasitic larvae crawl through these host tunnels until they encounter a host that they can burrow into. The parasitic larvae possess a modified respiratory system to better take advantage of their hosts. They breathe using spiracles located on their terminal abdominal segments, allowing them to breathe while almost entirely immersed in host tissue. The host's integument responds to this breach by surrounding the protruding larva, enclosing almost the entire length of the parasitoid in cuticle.

As the larva grows within its host, it must disengage from this outgrowth of the host's cuticle in order to better access untapped tissues. Zelia vertebrata is known as saproxylic, depending on moist rotting wood to serve as a habitat for its larval hosts.

== Distribution ==
Zelia vertebrata can be found across North America, ranging from northern regions of Canada to Northwest Mexico. While more records exist in the eastern portion of the United States, the species has been recorded in Utah., Guatemala, Mexico.

== Taxonomy ==
The genus Zelia was erected in 1830 by André Jean Baptiste Robineau-Desvoidy. The synonymous genera Leptoda, Metadexia, Euzelia, and Minthozelia were described after the founding of the genus Zelia by van der Wulp, Coquillett, Townsend, and Townsend respectively.

The species epithet for vertebrata was coined by Say in 1829, describing synonym Dexia vertebrata. Other synonyms include Zelia rostrata and Dexia gracilis.

James E. O'Hara and John O. Stireman collected a morphologically similar fly in the Red River Gorge in eastern Kentucky. Mitochondrial molecular COI and morphological data supported that this was a distinct species to Zelia vertebrata.
