= Western Baptist Bible College (Missouri) =

Baptist College in Kansas City, Missouri

- Former names: Western College and Industrial Institute, Colored Baptist College, Western Baptist College
- Type: Private
- Established: 1890
- Affiliations: Baptist
- President: Dr. Thad Jones
- Location: Kansas City, Missouri, USA; 39°05′12″N 94°34′00″W
- Campus: Suburban
- Website: Western Baptist Bible College KC.Org

Western Baptist Bible College is Baptist college in Kansas City, Missouri, United States with branches in St. Louis, Missouri, and several branches in Kansas: Junction City, Olathe, Topeka, and Wichita. The school was founded by African-American Baptist ministers in Independence, Missouri, in 1890. Two years later, it moved to Macon, Missouri, before moving to its location in Kansas City in 1921. It was the "first and only Christian Institution west of the Mississippi River founded by blacks exclusively."

== History ==
The Western College and Industrial Institute was established by a group of African-American Baptist ministers after a meeting of the Baptist General Association of Missouri in 1890 at Independence, Missouri. The school operated briefly in Independence, but seeking a permanent location, it moved two years later to Macon, Missouri. Initially, the school was established as a seminary, but recognizing the need to provide education to black students, a range of courses was soon provided. The first two teachers of the school were W. F. Smith and Mrs. C. R. McDowell. Other noted teachers at the school were Georgia Mabel DeBaptiste, Ida L. Garnett, Mary L. Sanders and Inman E. Page, was the president of the school between 1916 and 1918. The school was coeducational from the beginning and serviced a wide regional area including students from Colorado, Illinois, Iowa, Kansas, Missouri, Nebraska and Indian Territory/Oklahoma. In 1921, the school relocated to Kansas City, Missouri with the hopes of increasing enrollment. The move almost proved disastrous, as the competition in a larger city meant students had more choices. With support from the Missouri State Missionary Baptist Convention, the school survived and eventually returned to its original purpose, operating as a Theological Institute, in 1937. The buildings that the school occupied were originally built by the Women's Christian Association. One, which was the former home of the Gillis Orphans Home at 2119 Tracy Avenue, became known as Goins Hall and the other, was the former Armour Home for Aged Couples at 2125 Tracy Avenue, was called Johnson Hall. Goins Hall serves as an administration building for the university, while Johnson Hall is vacant and in need of renovation.

=== Plans for Renovation ===
In 2024, a renovation project was being designed for the campus on Tracy Avenue. Called the "District Row Development", the project sought $750,000 in city funds to assist in development. The proposed design included plans for 35 townhomes, office space, and renovating the Goins Hall building to include a fitness center and small museum.

The property was entirely fenced off some time between 2019 and 2022, according to Google Street View data.

=== Fire ===
On the morning of November 29, 2024, a fire erupted in the abandoned Goins Hall. One firefighter fell through a set of stairs and was hospitalized for non-life-threatening injuries.

== Academics ==
Western Baptist Bible College is an affiliate member of the Association for Biblical Higher Education and offers a range of undergraduate and graduate degrees.
