= Jesse Freeman Boulden =

American politician (1820–1899)

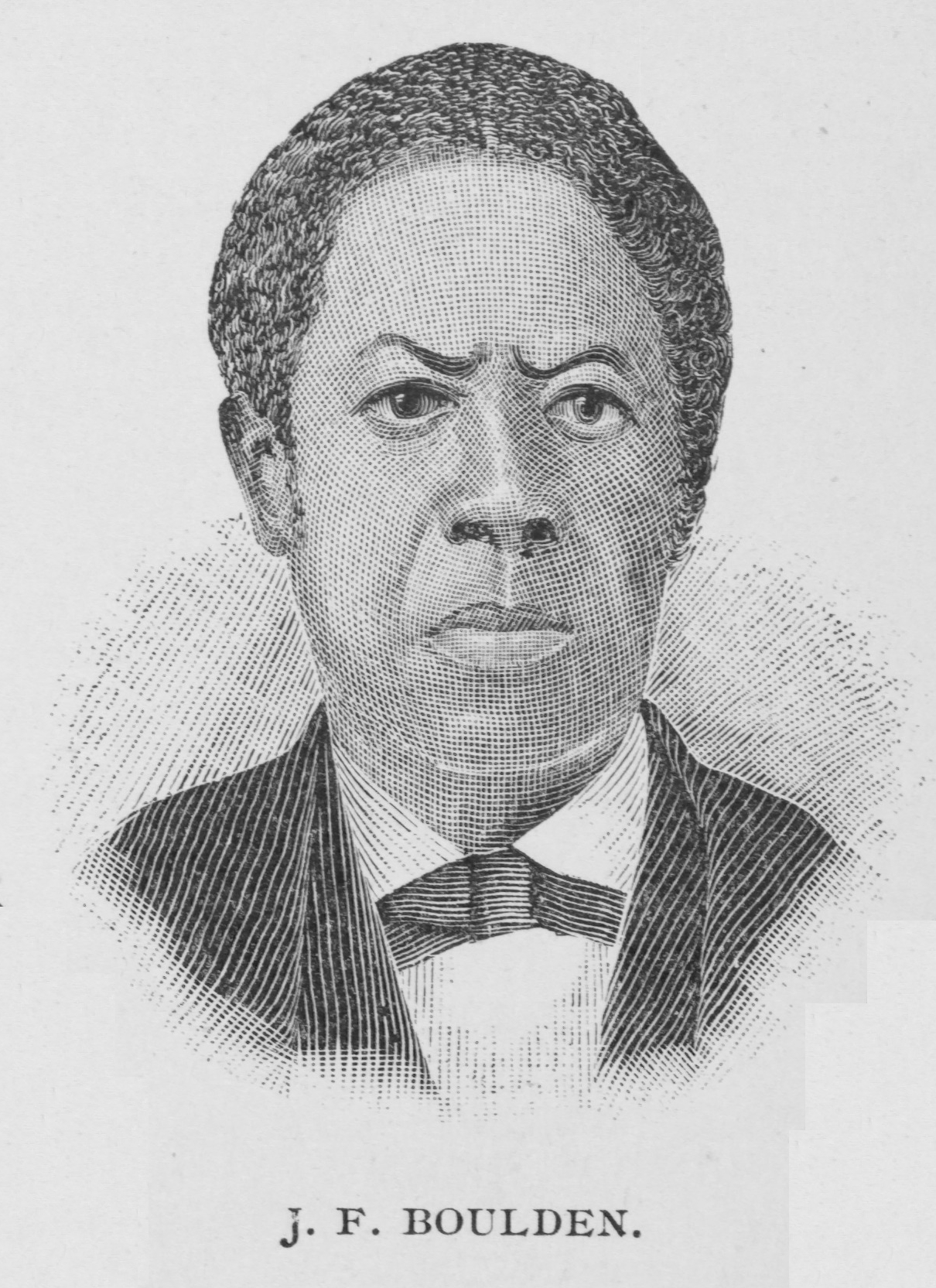
- Boulden in 1887
- Born: October 8, 1820; Delaware, U.S.
- Died: March 6, 1899 (aged 78)
- Occupations: Minister, politician
- Political party: Republican

Religious life
- Religion: Baptist

Jesse Freeman Boulden (October 8, 1820 – March 6, 1899) was a Baptist pastor and politician in Chicago and Mississippi. He founded churches including Olivet Baptist Church in Chicago. He served in the Mississippi House of Representatives during the Reconstruction Era. He also helped manage the Senate campaigns of Hiram Rhodes Revels and Blanche Kelso Bruce.

== Early life ==
Jesse Freeman Boulden was born a free man in Delaware on October 8, 1820, to Andrew and Theresa Boulden. The family were born when the law in Delaware manumitted slaves at the age of 28 and their children at the age of 21. In this way, only one of Jesse's siblings, a brother, was a slave. When his brother approached the age of 21, he fled to Pennsylvania with the help of the white children of his master to avoid being sold further South. Andrew was accused of aiding his son, and himself fled Delaware with the rest of his family to avoid persecution. In Philadelphia, Jesse went to Quaker schools, before returning to Delaware to apprentice and continue schooling. He converted to the Baptist religion in February 1834 and became pastor of Union Baptist Church in Philadelphia in 1853, where he served until 1860.

== During the American Civil War (1861–1865) ==
In 1860, Boulden moved to Chicago where David G. Lett was pastor at the leading Baptist church, Zoar Church. In March 1860, about 40 parishioners left that church to form Zion Baptist Church led by Boulden, with Rev Tansbury leading the old body. Tansbury returned to his previous home in Canada and on December 22, 1861, the two churches combined under Boulden's efforts to form a new church, Olivet Baptist Church, where Boulden served until 1863. Boulden then resigned and Richard DeBaptiste became its new pastor in 1863.

That year, he returned to Philadelphia, but when news reached him that St. Louis pastor and friend of Boulden J. R. Anderson had died, he moved to St. Louis, Missouri and took the pastorship at Anderson's church. In February 1864, Boulden attended the Wood River Baptist Association meeting at Brooklyn, Illinois and advocated for increased Baptist missionary work among slaves freed behind the advance of the Union Army during the American Civil War (1861–1865). In 1865, Boulden left his work in St. Louis and moved to Natchez, Mississippi where he organized what was then called Wall Street Baptist Church and later called Pine Street Baptist Church. He also worked for civil rights and made the first petition to Congress in 1865, asking for black franchise. Boulden was followed at Natchez by Henry P. Jacobs.

== Politics ==
In 1866, he moved to Columbus, Mississippi, where he became a leader in the nascent Republican Party in northeastern Mississippi and was a member of the first Republican State Convention in Vicksburg in July 1867.

In 1869, he was elected to the Mississippi House of Representatives. He was highly respected in the state party, and worked to establish Blanche Kelso Bruce as sergeant-at-arms to the State Senate. He contested for a seat in the state senate, but lost to Hiram Rhodes Revels. He also sought a seat in the United States Senate.

In 1872, Boulden organized a northern Mississippi General Missionary Baptist Association convention, which rivaled Henry Jacobs' Missionary Baptist Association as the organizing body of Baptists in the state. Boulden disputed with Jacobs' group due to the inclusion of a number of congregations Boulden considered "disorderly". The two groups merged in 1890.

== Other activities ==
He was pastor of the Nineteenth Street Baptist Church, originally called the First Colored Baptist Church in Washington, D.C. from 1877 to 1881.

In Mississippi, he was a trustee of the State Normal School and of Alcorn University. In 1883, he edited the journal, the Baptist Reflector in which he wrote and occasionally published poetry. In the late 1880s, he served as general agent of the American Baptist Home Mission Society for the State of New York assigned to Mississippi.

== Burial and legacy ==
He is buried at the Sandfield Cemetery in Columbus, Mississippi and has been the subject of 8 May Emancipation celebration performances at the cemetery.
