= Zelia N. Breaux =

American music instructor and musician (1880–1956)

- Born: Zelia N. Page; February 6, 1880; Jefferson City, Missouri, U.S.
- Died: October 31, 1956 (aged 76); Guthrie, Oklahoma, U.S.
- Occupation: Music teacher
- Years active: 1898–1948
- Known for: establishing music in African American Schools in Oklahoma

Zelia N. Breaux (February 6, 1880 – October 31, 1956) was an American music instructor and musician who played the trumpet, violin and piano. She organized the first music department at Langston University in Oklahoma and the school's first orchestra. As the Supervisor of Music for the segregated African American schools in Oklahoma City, Breaux organized bands, choral groups and orchestras, establishing a music teacher in each school in the district. She had a wide influence on many musicians including Charlie Christian and Jimmy Rushing, as well as novelist Ralph Ellison. Breaux was the first woman president of the Oklahoma Association of Negro Teachers and was posthumously inducted into the Oklahoma YWCA Hall of Fame, Oklahoma Women's Hall of Fame and the Oklahoma Bandmasters Association Hall of Fame. The Oklahoma City/County Historical Society made a posthumous presentation of its Pathmaker Award to Breaux in 2017.

== Biography ==
Zelia N. Page was born on February 6, 1880, in Jefferson City, Missouri, to Inman Edward and Zelia Ball Page. She earned a bachelor's degree in music from the Lincoln Institute, where her father was serving as principal. When her father accepted the presidency of the Colored Agricultural and Normal University (now Langston University) on 1 May 1898, he offered her a job as a music teacher and she relocated to Oklahoma Territory. Page established the school's music department and taught piano and instrumental music. In 1902, she organized the first orchestra at Langston which began with seven musicians and two years later had grown to 23 students. She established the choral society, a glee club and the school band, requiring students to study classical music.

=== Marriage and family ===
On 6 December 1905, Page married Armogen Breaux. The couple had one son, Inman A. Breaux (4 October 1908 – 24 November 1967), who was a Professor of Education, an Administrative Dean, and Dean of Student Affairs at Langston University.

=== Oklahoma City years ===
In 1918, Breaux left Langston and accepted the position as Supervisor of Music for the segregated African American schools in Oklahoma City. She established a music teacher in each grade school in the district, organized the Oklahoma City Community Band, and headed the music department at Douglass High School. While at Douglass, she organized a twenty-four-voice chorus, an eighteen-piece symphony orchestra, and several glee clubs. At this time, it was unusual for black schools to offer music training beyond voice instruction, but Breaux believed that the discipline and instruction of classical music served as a catalyst for elevating and mastering life.

Breaux believed in her independence. She lived in Oklahoma City and taught, managed the Aldridge theater and rental properties, commuting back and forth to Langston, where her husband lived. She hired a live-in cook to prepare her meals.

She was a talented musician and played the trumpet, violin and piano. Breaux discouraged her students playing jazz, instructing them in classical music and music theory but she owned the only black theater in Oklahoma City and often hired blues and jazz musicians to play at her Aldridge Theater. Count Basie, Gonzelle White and King Oliver's bands all played there, as well as Ida Cox, Ma Rainey, Bessie Smith and Mamie Smith.

The Douglass High School band, which she organized in 1923 with twenty-five participants, was renowned throughout the United States. The students, who were both junior and senior high musicians, became minor celebrities. Through their national appearances, the band influenced a wide range of musicians including Eubie Blake, Charlie Christian, Duke Ellington, Jimmy Rushing, Noble Sissle, and Sherman Sneed. Ralph Ellison, novelist and musician, called Breaux his "second mother".

In 1932 Breaux organized the May Day celebrations, during which the Douglass band played. In 1933 the band led the Century of Progress Parade at the Chicago World's Fair and they performed for a national radio broadcast while there. The Douglass band performed at the Texas Centennial Celebration in Dallas in 1936 and in 1937 participated in the Black State Band Festival, which Breaux created, with seven other bands.

Breaux earned a master's degree in music education from Northwestern University in Evanston, Illinois in 1939. Her thesis was entitled, The development of instrumental music in Negro secondary schools and colleges. Breaux was appointed as the first female President of the Oklahoma Association of Negro Teachers. She retired in 1948 from Douglass High School.

Breaux died in Guthrie, Oklahoma on 31 October 1956.

=== Awards ===
In 1977, she was posthumously inducted into the YWCA Hall of Fame and in 1983, Breaux was inducted into the Oklahoma Women's Hall of Fame. On 25 July 1991 she was entered in the Oklahoma Bandmasters Association Hall of Fame. The Oklahoma City/County Historical Society made a posthumous presentation of its Pathmaker Award to Zelia Breaux at its luncheon on September 9, 2017.

== Pupils of Zelia N. Breaux ==
- Charlie Christian
- Buddy Anderson
