= John W. E. Thomas =

American politician (1847–1899)

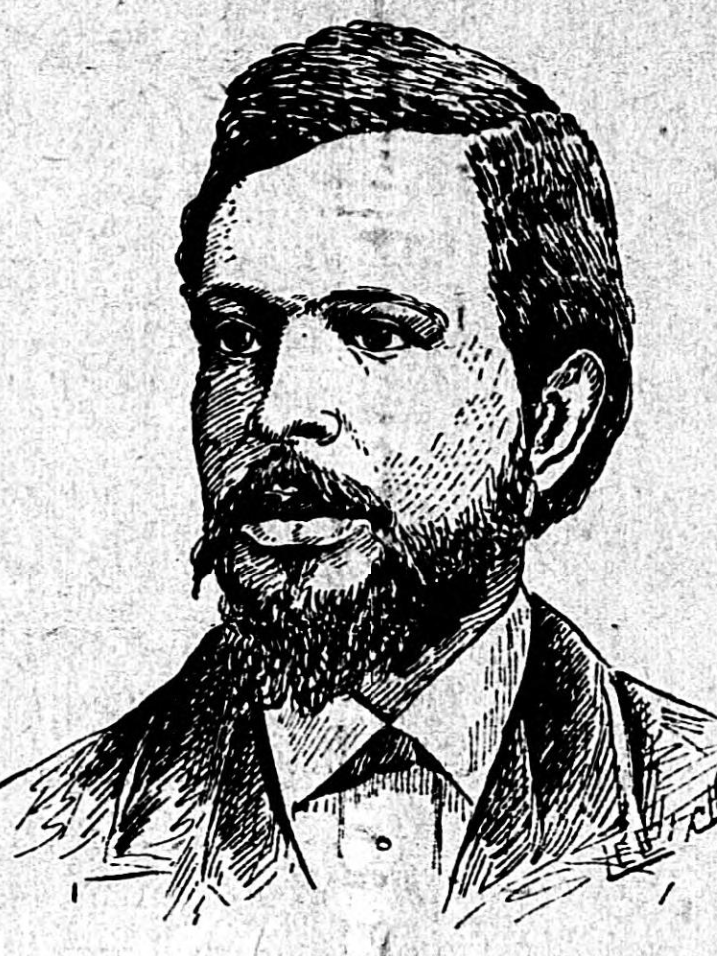
- Sketch of Thomas in The Appeal (1899)

Member of the Illinois House of Representatives from the 2nd district
- In office 1877–1879

Member of the Illinois House of Representatives from the 3rd district
- In office 1883–1886

Personal details
- Born: May 1, 1847 Montgomery, Alabama, U.S.
- Died: December 18, 1899 (aged 52) Chicago, Illinois, U.S.
- Party: Republican
- Spouses: Maria Reynolds (m. 1864; died 1878) Justine Latcher (m. 1880; died 1883) Crittie E.O. Marshall (m. 1887)
- Children: 8
- Occupation: Grocer; real estate developer
- Profession: Lawyer; teacher

John William Edinburgh Thomas (May 1, 1847 – December 18, 1899) was an American businessman, educator, and Illinois politician. Born into slavery in Alabama, he moved to Chicago after the Civil War, where he became a prominent community leader. In 1876 he became the first African American elected to the Illinois General Assembly. Thomas was instrumental in passage of Illinois' first anti-discrimination in public accommodations law, which he introduced in 1885.

John W. E. Thomas

== Biography ==
Thomas was born May 1, 1847, in Montgomery, Alabama. During the American Civil War, Thomas defied laws governing slavery, and taught other slaves how to read and write. He became a school teacher in the south before moving to Chicago with his wife and daughter in 1869. In Chicago, he opened a grocery store, started a school for blacks, and became very involved in Olivet Baptist Church, then located in the South Chicago Loop, which would become his constituency. He was elected to the Illinois House of Representatives in 1876 to serve in the 30th Illinois General Assembly. He was elected from the 2nd district and served alongside Joseph E. Smith and James B. Taylor. He was an unsuccessful candidate in the 1878 and 1880 general elections, but returned to the state house as a member of the 33rd and 34th Illinois General Assemblies from the 3rd district alongside Democrats Thomas McNally and Isaac Abrahams. He was admitted to the bar in 1880 and practiced law, while also expanding his holdings in real estate. In 1885, he was one of the 103 House members to support the U. S. Senate candidacy of John A. Logan; a fellow Republican. Also in 1885, Thomas introduced the legislation which became Illinois' first law preventing discrimination in public accommodations. He was elected South Town Clerk in 1886 and served a single term. He died December 18, 1899, as one of the wealthiest African-Americans in Chicago.
