= Jefferson Pinder =

American artist (born 1970)

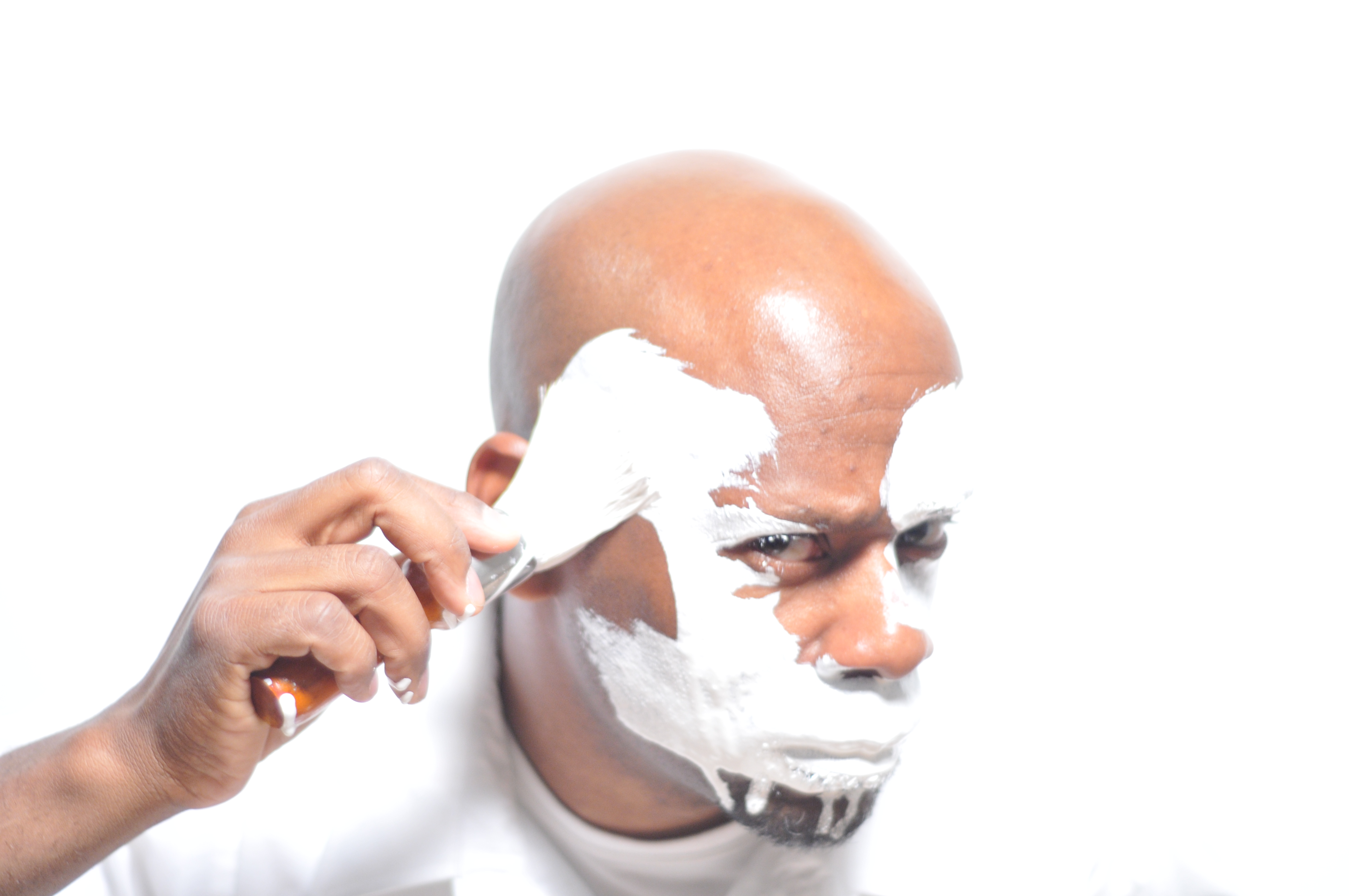
- Born: December 1970 (age 55); Washington, D.C., United States
- Education: University of Maryland
- Awards: USA Fellowship; 2016 Theater & Performance – USA Joyce Fellow; Guggenheim Fellowship; 2017 Fine Arts – John S. Guggenheim Fellow; Moving Image Acquisition Award; 2016; Rome Prize; 2026 Visual Arts – American Academy in Rome
- Website: jeffersonpinder.com

Jefferson Pinder (born 1970, Washington, D.C.) is an African-American performance artist whose work provokes commentary about race and struggle.

== Artwork ==
Working primarily with neon, found objects, and video, Pinder investigates identity through dynamic circumstances and materials. From uncanny video portraits associated with popular music to durational work that puts the black body in motion, his work examines physical conditioning that reveals an emotional response. His work has been featured in group and solo shows including exhibitions at The Studio Museum in Harlem, the Wadsworth Athenaeum Museum of Art in Hartford, Connecticut, Showroom Mama in Rotterdam, Netherlands, The Phillips Collection, and the National Portrait Gallery in Washington, DC. In 2016, he was awarded a United States Artist's Joyce Fellowship Award in the field of performance and was a 2017 John S. Guggenheim Fellow. Currently, Pinder is a professor of sculpture at the School of the Art Institute of Chicago.

== Career ==
Pinder gained national attention with the exhibition Frequency at The Studio Museum in Harlem in 2006. Pinder has since gone on to exhibit nationally and internationally in galleries and museums including the High Museum; Birmingham Museum of Art; the National Portrait Gallery in Washington, DC; the Studio Museum in Harlem; the Wadsworth Atheneum Museum of Art in Hartford, Connecticut; the Kentucky Museum of Art and Craft; and the Zacheta National Gallery in Warsaw, Poland, among others Pinder's work has been featured in the 2016 Shanghai Biennale and at the Smithsonian Museum of African American History and Culture.

Pinder's work is also in public collections including the Yale University Art Gallery, the Studio Museum of Harlem, the High Museum of Art, and the David C. Driskell Collection among many others.

From 2003 - 2011, Pinder worked at the University of Maryland as an assistant professor of theory, performance, and foundations. After relocating to Chicago from Washington DC in 2011, Pinder became a professor of sculpture at the School of the Art Institute of Chicago and beginning in the summer of 2019, Pinder became the Dean of Faculty. Additionally, Pinder has lectured at the University of Massachusetts, Amherst; College Arts Association; The Phillips Collection, Washington, DC; Sudan University for Science & Technology, Khartoum, Sudan; the Black Film Center at Indiana University; the Corcoran College of Art and Design; Maryland Institute College of Art; California College of the Arts; and American University, among others.

In 2021, Pinder was featured in "Selections from the Inertia Cycle", a series of video performance works at Western Carolina University. Also in 2021, Pinder was awarded a Smithsonian Fellowship from the Smithsonian Artist Research Fellowship Program to "delve into archival films and materials documenting the everyday lives of Black Americans at the National Museum of African American History and Culture." In 2026 Pinder was awarded the Rome prize in visual arts from the American Academy in Rome to create a choreographed and interventionist trash cleaning performance in the streets of Rome.

== Education ==
Pinder received a BA in theatre (‘93) and an MFA in Mixed Media (‘03), both from the University of Maryland. Pinder also studied at the Asolo Theatre Conservatory in Sarasota, Florida.
