= Olivet Baptist Church =

Coordinates: 41.8382°N 87.6167°W

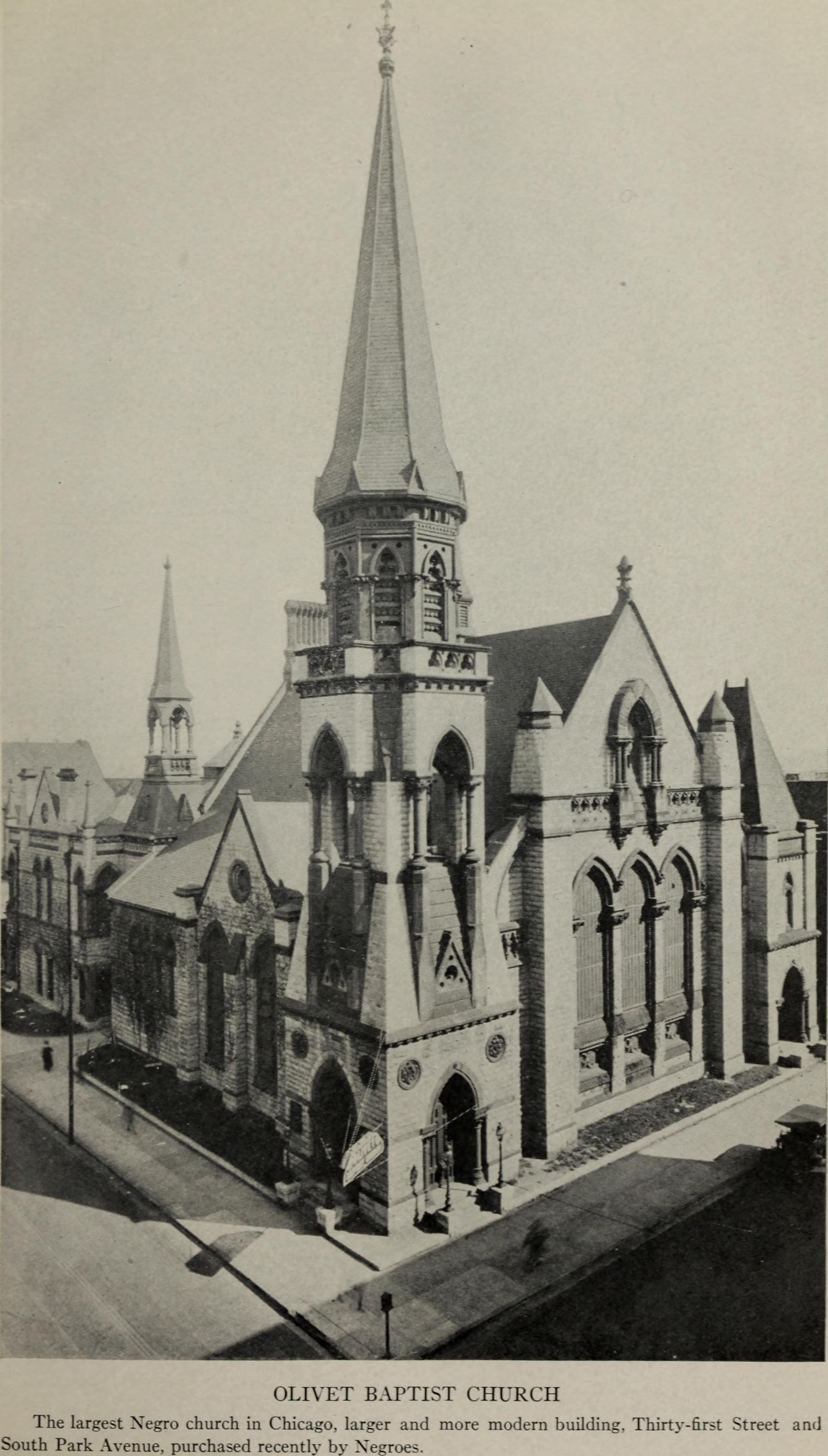
- Olivet Baptist Church in the 1920s
- Olivet Baptist Church
- Country: USA
- Denomination: Baptist

History
- Founded: 1861

Olivet Baptist Church is a church located in Chicago, Illinois. The congregation first formed in 1861 through the merger of two African-American congregations.

== History ==
Before 1860, David G. Lett was pastor at the city's leading Black Baptist church, Zoar Church. In March 1860, about 40 parishioners left that church to form Zion Baptist Church led by Jesse Freeman Boulden, with Rev Tansbury leading the old body. Tansbury returned to his previous home in Canada and on December 22, 1861, the two churches combined under Boulden's efforts to form the new church, Olivet Baptist Church, where Boulden served until 1863. Nancy Green was a founding member of the congregation of the church. Boulden then resigned and Richard DeBaptiste became its new pastor in August 1863. DeBaptiste served until February 1882. He was followed by James Alfred Dunn Podd who served until his death in late 1886.

The church was part of the Underground Railroad during the abolition movement. Lacy Kirk Williams became pastor in 1916, during the first Great Migration, and steered the church into providing social services for these migrants, including assistance finding housing, childcare, and the creation of Chicago's first kindergarten program. Princeton University professor of religion and African-American studies Wallace Best has described the church as "a national model" for how to "help Black migrants settle in the North and support their needs beyond the spiritual".

During its heyday, the church was the largest African-American church in the United States, and the largest Protestant congregation in the world. The congregation increased greatly in size in the 1920s due to the Great Migration, when the church provided services and structure to Southern blacks who had relocated to the north, bringing the congregation to 11,000. By the 1940s the congregation numbered 20,000.

The church is the oldest operating African American Baptist church in Chicago.
