= Inman E. Page =

Baptist leader and college president (1853–1935)

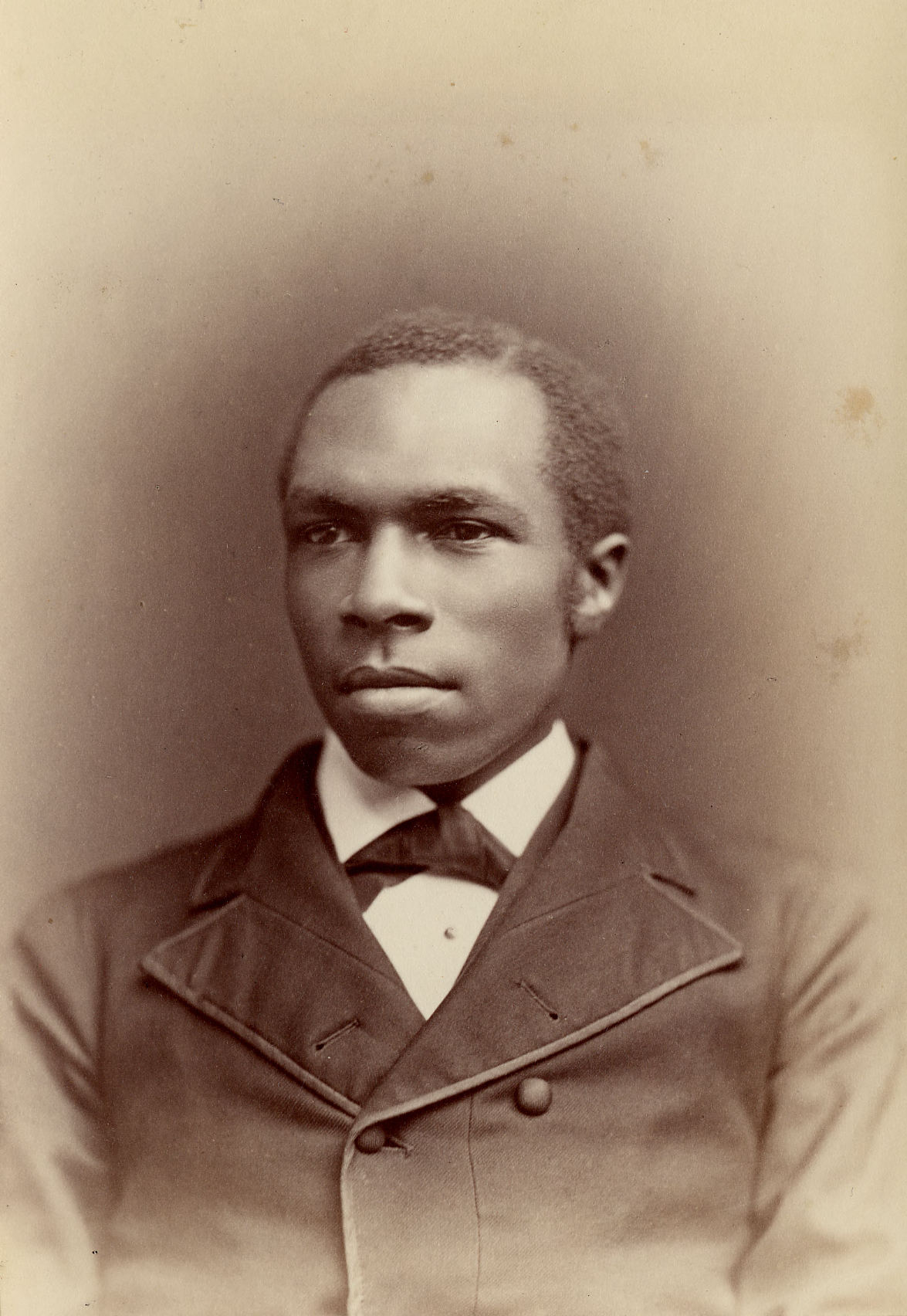
- Page in 1877
- Born: December 29, 1853; Warrenton, Virginia, U.S.
- Died: December 21, 1935 (aged 81); Oklahoma City, Oklahoma, U.S.
- Education: Howard University, Brown University
- Occupations: Minister, educator
- Political party: Republican

Religious life
- Religion: Baptist

Inman E. Page (December 29, 1853 – December 21, 1935) was a Baptist leader and educator in Oklahoma, Missouri and Tennessee. He was president of four schools: the Lincoln Institute, Langston University, Western University, and Roger Williams University and principal of Douglass High School in Oklahoma City. He and George Milford were the first black students at Brown University.

== Early life ==
Inman Edward Page was born a slave in Warrenton, Virginia, on December 29, 1853, to Horace and Elizabeth Page. His obituary had the name of the slave owner as Fanshot. In late 1877, Horace Page made a compensation claim to the Federal government for losses during the American Civil War. In this report, his father reported his master as a man named Alexander Craig, who died in 1859, and thereafter his wife, Mrs. Craig, and the executor of their estate, William H. Gaines. As a slave, Horace hired himself out and was running a livery stable in Washington, D.C., before the start of the war and had business in Warrenton and in Fauquier County. He had a number of horses and other supplies taken by the Union Army during the war and provided some manual labor. He was able to buy his freedom with money from his business. He did not finish paying until after the Emancipation Proclamation, but decided to pay the full agreed amount because the deal for his freedom was made before the war began. Horace and his family moved to Washington, D. C., in 1862 and Inman attended the school of George F. T. Cook, brother of John F. Cook Jr. He also took hired work to support his family and later attended night school taught by George Boyer Vashon. He then took work at Howard University, grading the campus grounds, in order to pay for his schooling there. He was promoted to janitor at the school, and when Oliver O. Howard was working to close the Freedmen's Bureau, of which Howard had been a part, Page was hired as one of Howard's clerks. In this way, he was a student at Howard until 1873.

=== Brown University ===
In the fall of 1873 he and his friend George W. Milford became the first black students to enroll at Brown University in Providence, Rhode Island. The pair faced great discrimination, but at the end of his sophomore year he won an oratorical contest which endeared him to his classmates. His popularity increased and he was made class orator at the end of his senior year. Page delivered the class-day speech on the "Intellectual Prospects of America" and among the audience was D. W. Phillips who offered Page a position at the Natchez Seminary in Natchez, Mississippi, run by the American Baptist Home Mission Society. He graduated from Brown in the fall of 1877 and moved to Natchez. In 1880 he received an A. M. (a master's degree) from Brown. In 1918, Brown president William Faunce honored Page with an honorary master's degree. Later he was awarded honorary degrees of doctor of law from Wilberforce University and from Howard University.

=== Family ===
In Providence in the winter of 1877– 1878 he married Zelia R. Ball, who had graduated in 1875 from Wilberforce University. They had three children, Zelia, Mary, and Inman E. Page Jr. Page Jr. died at the age of seven. Zelia, later Zelia N. Breaux, became a widely known music teacher; Mary married Nolan Pyrtle, a professor at Wilberforce University.

== Career ==
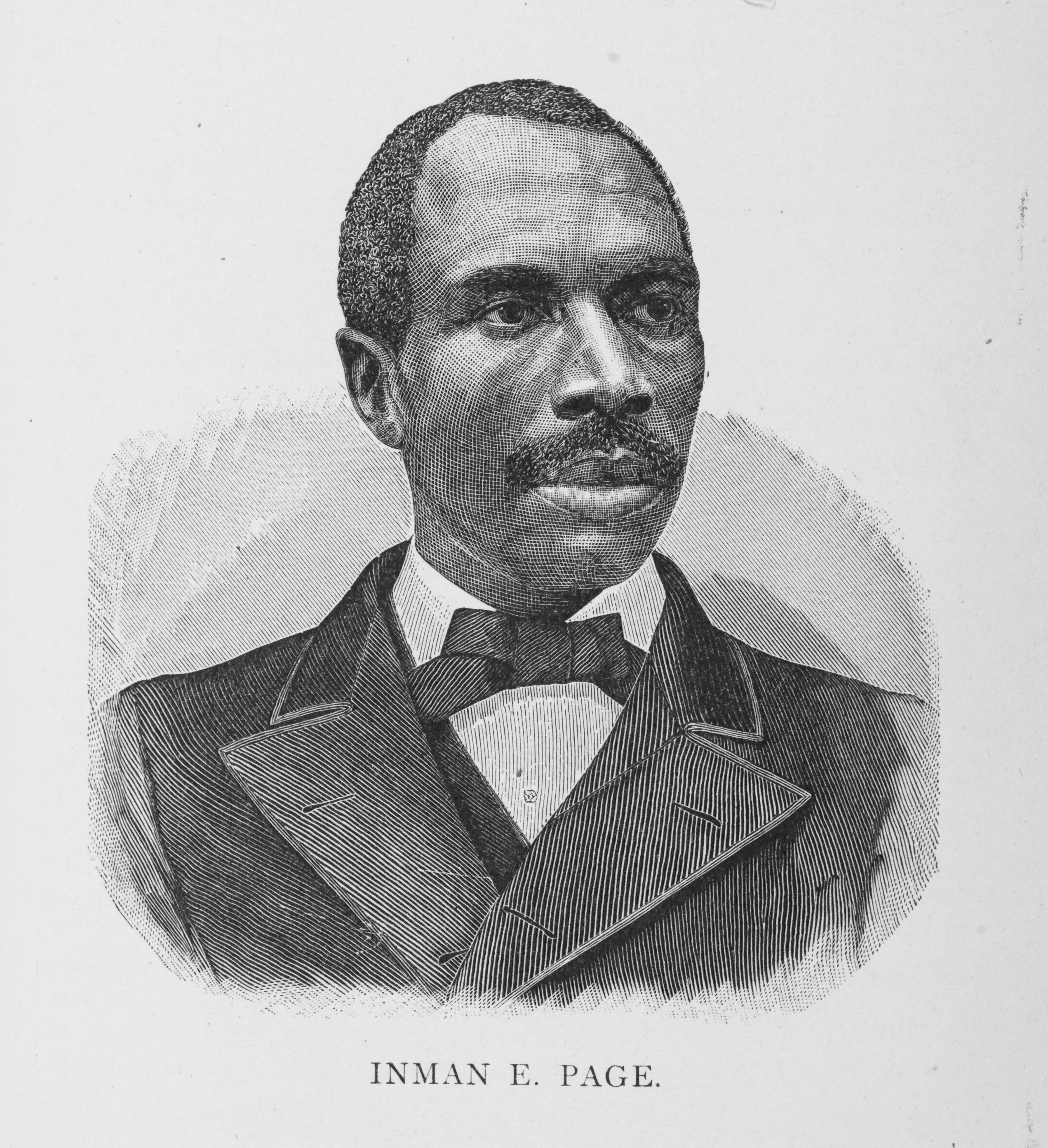
Page in 1887

=== Lincoln Institute ===
In 1878, Page moved to Jefferson City, Missouri, and took a position as teacher at the Lincoln Institute. For his first two years at the Lincoln Institute, he was the only black regular teacher, but in 1880, the board of trustees decided to change strategies and have the school taught by black teachers and installed Page as school president. Page quickly began to grow the school, increasing enrollment from 97 to 153 in his first year, reducing student expenses, and securing appropriations from the state legislature to build two dormitories, one for men and one for women, and an increase in biennial state appropriations. In 1883, he was elected president of the Missouri State Teachers' association and was reelected to multiple successive terms.

In 1887, the university added college work to its curriculum and in 1891 it was designated a land-grant institution and embarked on additional building construction, and the school expanded again in 1895. One of the first professors Page hired was Josephine A. Silone, who arrived in 1881 and taught chemistry, elocution, and English literature. Among the students Page influenced at Lincoln were physicians William J. Thompkins and J. Edward Perry and bishop William Tecumseh Vernon. In 1898, Page resigned from the presidency at the Lincoln Institute after facing political pressure to leave.

=== Langston University ===
In 1898, Page was lured to Oklahoma Territory to become the president of the Colored Agricultural and Normal University in Langston, Oklahoma. The school became known as Langston University and Page was its head for 18 years. At Langston, Page was a success and the student population and the campus grew. However, Page did not avoid controversy. In 1903, Page was tried for incompetency and mismanagement but was completely exonerated. In 1916, Page, a lifelong Republican, was removed from presidency by Democratic state politicians. He was replaced by Isaac McCutcheon for nine months and then by John Miller Marquess.

=== Later career ===
From 1916 to 1918, Page was president of the Colored Baptist College of Macon, Missouri, which was later known as Western Baptist Bible College and moved to Kansas City, Missouri. He then moved to Roger Williams University in Nashville, Tennessee, to serve as its president.

Page's health failed and he moved to Oklahoma City in 1920. In 1921 and 1922 he was the supervising principal of the city's black elementary school and principal of Douglass High School. In 1922, he briefly returned to Lincoln Institute, then renamed Lincoln University of Missouri, when the board there pushed out then president Richardson, but he resigned in August 1923 and returned to Douglass High School. He remained with the Oklahoma City Public Schools for the rest of his life. He retired In June 1935 with the honorary title of "principal emeritus".

== Death and legacy ==
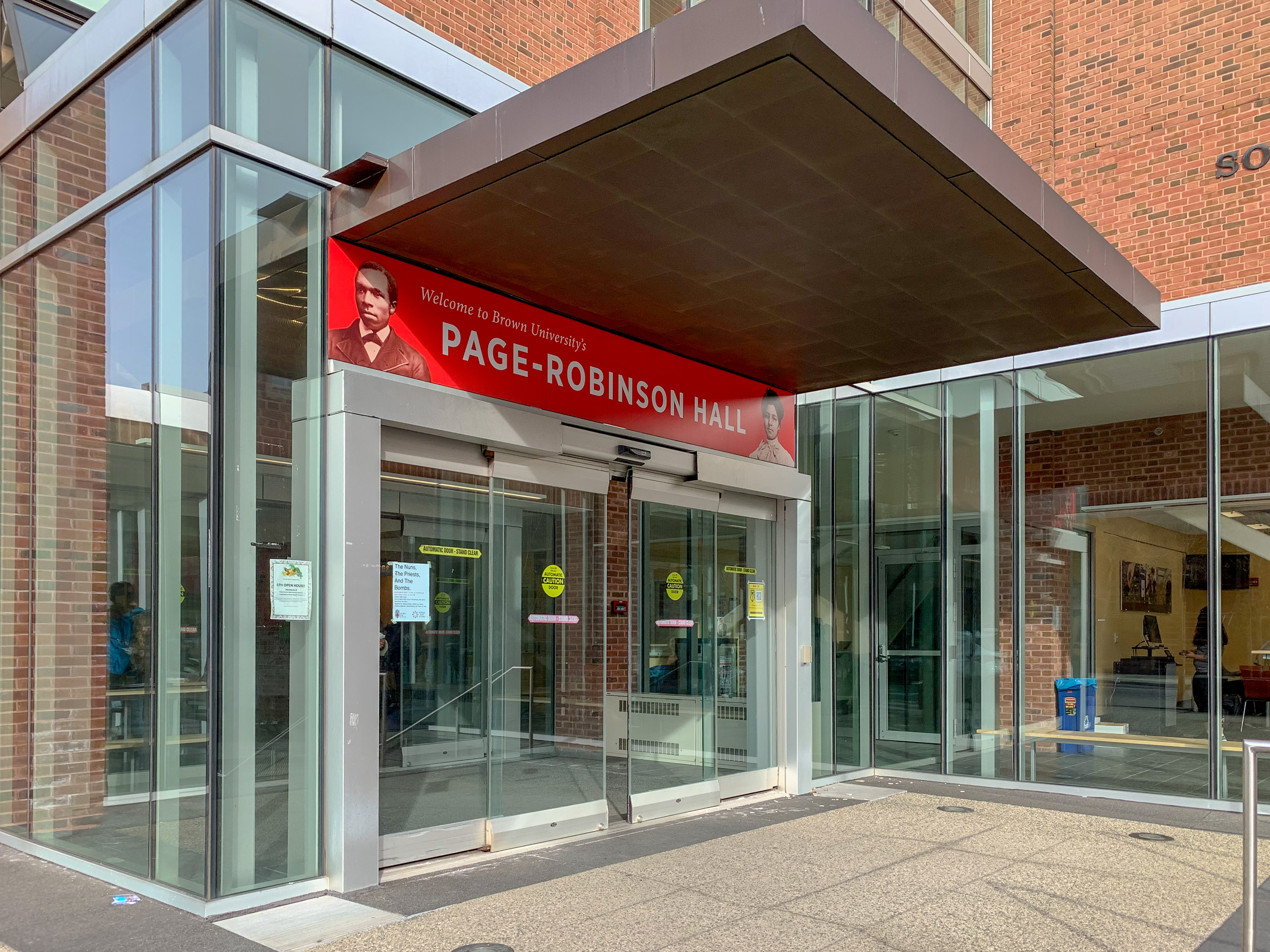
Page-Robinson Hall at Brown University

Page died of old age on December 21, 1935, at the home of his daughter Zelia in Oklahoma City. He was buried on the campus of Langston University, and the tract where his remains were laid was called "Page Memorial Park". Multiple buildings in Oklahoma have been named in Page's honor. On May 19, 1950, Lincoln University named its library after Page. In 2018, Brown University renamed a six-story academic and administrative facility after Page and fellow alum Ethel Tremaine Robinson.

Ralph Ellison was a student of Page at Douglass High School and the two had a difficult relationship at that time. However, Ellison was inspired by Page and later in his life was deeply moved and inspired by a watercolor portrait of Page he saw at Brown's Rockefeller Library in 1979.

There has been an Inman E. Page Library at Lincoln University.
