= Zelia Ball Page =

American teacher (1850–1937)

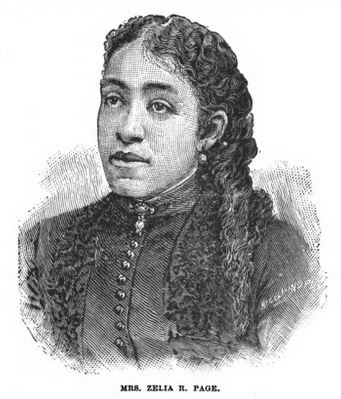
- Born: Zelia R. Ball c. 1850; Alexandria, Virginia, U.S.
- Died: July 15, 1937; Oklahoma City, Oklahoma, U.S.
- Other name: Zelia R. Page
- Occupation: educator
- Years active: 1875–1920
- Known for: first matron of Langston University

Zelia Ball Page (c. 1850–1937) was a freeborn African-American teacher who spent her career teaching African-American youths in Missouri, Oklahoma and Tennessee. Her husband was the first head of Langston University and she was the first matron.

== Early life ==
Zelia R. Ball was born about 1850, in Alexandria, Virginia (Note: The date shown on Page's tombstone of June 21, 1850 may be incorrect, as the 1865 census shows her to have been born in 1847. The 1920 census records her as having been born in 1865, which seems improbable given her graduation from university in 1875.) to a free African-American woman who raised her in Washington, D.C. Her mother worked with the Underground Railroad and fearing for her daughter's safety, she made an arrangement with Dr. Peter Parker to assist her in taking her child to New England. Mother and child pretended to be slaves of Parker until they reached the port of New York and were able to make their way to Providence, Rhode Island. Once in Providence, the school systems were found to be lacking and Ball was sent to be educated in Boston. In 1870, she entered Wilberforce University, graduating with a B.S. degree in 1875.

== Career ==
Upon completion of her schooling, Ball returned to Providence and applied to become a teacher in Washington, D. C. On June 27, 1878, she married Inman E. Page. That same year, the couple moved to Jefferson City, Missouri, to begin teaching at the Lincoln Institute. Page was hired as a science teacher and her husband was initially the assistant principal, though he was promoted to principal in 1880. Page taught botany, physiology and zoology and in 1885 was appointed as matron. During this time, the couple had three children: Zelia N., Mary and Inman, Jr., who died when he was seven years old. In 1891, Page organized the Union Training School to teach skills to poor black youths and continued teaching at Lincoln for seven more years.

In 1898, the couple left Lincoln and moved to Langston, Oklahoma Territory, where Inman took up the post as the first head of the Oklahoma Colored Agricultural and Normal University. Page was hired as the matron and their daughter Zelia Breaux was hired as the music instructor of the new university. She also served as the Oklahoma officer for the Afro-American Council. In 1915, the couple left Oklahoma, moving to Macon, Missouri, where Inman became president of the Colored Baptist College. Within three years, they moved to Nashville, Tennessee, where Inman served as president of Roger Williams University and Page continued teaching. They briefly returned to Lincoln Institute before moving again to Oklahoma in 1924.

== Death and legacy ==
Page died at her daughter Zelia's home in Oklahoma City, Oklahoma, from heart complications on July 15, 1937. In her lifetime, Page's contributions to educating African-American youth were widely recognized.
