= Zelia =

Zelia may refer to:

- Zelia (given name)
- Tropical Cyclone Zelia (1998)
- Severe Tropical Cyclone Zelia (2011)
- 169 Zelia, an asteroid
- Zelia (fly), a genus of insects in the family Tachinidae
