= List of incidents of civil unrest in the United States =

List of incidents from 1783 to the present

Listed are major episodes of civil unrest in the United States. This list does not include the numerous incidents of destruction and violence associated with various sporting events.

== 18th century ==
- 1783 – Pennsylvania Mutiny of 1783, June 20. Anti-government protest by soldiers of the Continental Army against the Congress of the Confederation, Philadelphia, Pennsylvania
- 1786 – Shays's Rebellion, August 29, 1786 – February 3, 1787, Western Massachusetts
- 1786 – Paper Money Riot, September 20, Exeter, New Hampshire
- 1788 – Doctors Mob Riot, New York City
- 1791–1794 – Whiskey Rebellion, Western Pennsylvania (anti-excise tax on whiskey)
- 1799 – Fries's Rebellion, 1799–1800, Tax revolt by Pennsylvania Dutch farmers, Pennsylvania

== 19th century ==
=== 1800–1849 ===
- 1811 – 1811 German Coast uprising, slave revolt in the Territory of Orleans
- 1812 – Baltimore riots, these took place shortly before the War of 1812
- 1824 – Hard Scrabble and Snow Town Riots, 1824 & 1831 respectively, Providence, RI (race riots)
- 1829 – Cincinnati riots of 1829, August 15–22, Cincinnati, Ohio; race riots triggered by labor competition between Irish immigrants and southern black migrants
- 1831 – Nat Turner's Rebellion, August 21–23, Southampton County, Virginia
- 1833 – Sylvester Graham Riot, Providence, Rhode Island
- 1834 – Anti-abolitionist riot, New York City
- 1834 – Philadelphia race riot, August 12– 14
- 1834 – Attack on Canterbury Female Boarding School, Canterbury, Connecticut, one of the first schools for African American girls
- 1834 – Sylvester Graham Riot, Portland, Maine
- 1835 – Baltimore bank riot, August 6–9
- 1835 – Gentleman's Riot, numerous riots throughout 1835 targeting abolitionists, Boston, Massachusetts
- 1835 – Snow Riot, Washington D.C.; race riot caused by labor competition
- 1835 – Destruction of Noyes Academy, Canaan, New Hampshire, a racially integrated school
- 1835–1836 – Toledo War, a boundary dispute between states of Michigan and Ohio
- 1836 – Cincinnati Riots of 1836, Cincinnati, Ohio (race riots)
- 1837 – Flour Riots, New York City
- 1837 – Murder of abolitionist Elijah Lovejoy
- 1837 – Sylvester Graham Riot, Boston, Massachusetts
- 1838 – Burning of Pennsylvania Hall; a lecture hall built with the intention of debating abolition, women's rights, and other reforms is burned down only 4 days after opening.
- 1839 – Honey War, Iowa-Missouri border
- 1839 – Anti-Rent War, Hudson Valley, New York
- 1841 – Dorr Rebellion, Rhode Island
- 1841 – Cincinnati Riots of 1841, early September, Cincinnati, Ohio (race riot)
- 1842 – Lombard Street Riot, (a.k.a. the Abolition Riots), August 1, Philadelphia
- 1842 – Muncy Abolition riot of 1842
- 1844 – Philadelphia Nativist Riots, May 6–8, July 6–7, Philadelphia (anti-Catholic)
- 1845 – Milwaukee Bridge War
- 1849 – Astor Place riot, May 10, New York City, (anti-British)

=== 1850–1859 ===
- 1851 – Christiana Riot, Lancaster County, Pennsylvania
- 1853 – Cincinnati Riot of 1853, Cincinnati, Ohio (anti-Catholic)
- 1855 – Cincinnati riots of 1855 (anti-immigration)
- 1855 – Lager Beer Riot, April 21, Chicago, Illinois
- 1855 – Portland Rum Riot, June 2, Portland, Maine
- 1855 – Bloody Monday, Know-Nothing Party riot, August 6, Louisville, Kentucky (anti-immigration)
- 1855 – Detroit brothel riots, 1855–1859, Detroit, Michigan
- 1856 – Sacking of Lawrence, Kansas, May 21, 1856, when proslavery settlers ransacked Lawrence, Kansas, founded by antislavery Yankees. Kansas Territory became known as Bleeding Kansas.
- 1856 – Battle of Seattle (1856), Jan 26, Attack by Native American tribesmen upon Seattle, Washington.
- 1856 – Pottawatomie massacre, May 24, Franklin County, Kansas
- 1856 – Baltimore Know-Nothing riots of 1856, (anti-immigration)
- 1856 – San Francisco Vigilance Movement, San Francisco, California
- 1857 – Know-Nothing Riot, June 1, Washington D.C. (anti-immigration)
- 1857 – New York City Police Riot, June 16, New York City
- 1857 – Dead Rabbits Riot, July 4–5, New York City
- 1858 – Know-Nothing Riot 1858, New Orleans, Louisiana (anti-immigration)
- 1858 – Staten Island Quarantine War, September 1 & 2, 1858
- 1859 – John Brown's raid on Harpers Ferry, October 16, Harpers Ferry, Virginia

=== 1860–1869 ===
- 1861–1865: American Civil War, April 12, 1861 – May 26, 1865, United States
- 1861 – Baltimore Riot of 1861, April 19, (a.k.a. the Pratt Street Riot), Baltimore, Maryland
- 1861 – Camp Jackson Affair, May 10, Union forces clash with Confederate sympathizers on the streets of St. Louis, 28 dead, 100 injured, St. Louis, Missouri
- 1862 – 1862 Brooklyn riot occurred August 4 between the New York Metropolitan Police against a white mob attacking African American strike-breakers at a Tobacco Factory
- 1862 – Buffalo riot of 1862, August 12, Buffalo, New York (labor riot)
- 1863 – Detroit race riot of 1863, March 6
- 1863 – Tally's War/Skunk River War, Keokuk County, Iowa
- 1863 – Southern bread riots, April 2, Riots which broke out in the South during the Civil War due to food shortages throughout the Confederate States of America
- 1863 – Battle of Fort Fizzle, June, also known as the Holmes County Draft Riots, active resistance to the draft during the Civil War, Holmes County, Ohio
- 1863 – New York City draft riots, July 13–16, (anti-draft)
- 1864 – Charleston Riot, March 28, Charleston, Illinois
- 1865 – April 1–3, 1865 Burning of Richmond The endgame of the Civil War
- 1866 – Memphis Riots of 1866, May 1–3, Race riot that broke out during Reconstruction, Memphis, Tennessee
- 1866 – New Orleans riot, July 30, New Orleans, Louisiana
- 1867 – 1867 Franklin riot, July 10, Franklin, Tennessee
- 1867 – 1867 Rogersville riot, July 26, Rogersville, Tennessee
- 1868 – Pulaski Riot, Pulaski, Tennessee (race riot)

=== 1870–1879 ===
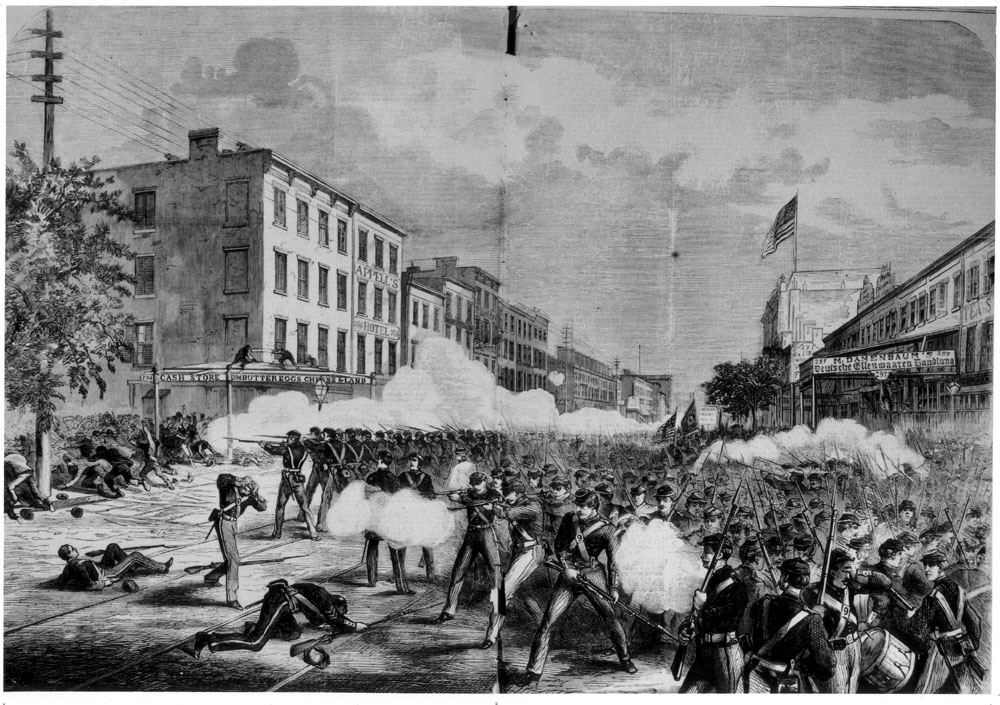
The New York Orange Riot of 1871, between Irish Catholics and Irish Protestants.

- 1870 – First New York City Orange riot, Irish Catholics versus Irish Protestants during The Twelfth celebrations
- 1870 – Kirk-Holden war, July–November, Caswell and Alamance counties North Carolina
- 1870 – Mamaroneck Riot, labor riot between Italian and Irish laborers
- 1870 – Eutaw Riot, Eutaw, Alabama, Ku Klux Klan attacked a Republican rally
- 1871 – Second New York City Orange riot outside US Grand Orange Lodge
- 1871 – Meridian race riot of 1871, March, Meridian, Mississippi
- 1871 – Los Angeles anti-Chinese riot, Los Angeles, California
- 1873 – Colfax massacre, April 13, Colfax, Louisiana (race related)
- 1874 – Brooks–Baxter War, an attempted coup of Arkansas by the failed gubernatorial candidate
- 1874 – Coushatta massacre, August, An attack by the White League on Republican officeholders and freedmen, Coushatta, Louisiana
- 1874 – Election Riot of 1874, Barbour County, Alabama (race related)
- 1874 – Tompkins Square Riot, New York City (poverty)
- 1874 – Battle of Liberty Place, New Orleans, Louisiana (anti-Reconstruction)
- 1874–1875 – Vicksburg massacre, Vicksburg, Mississippi (anti-Reconstruction)
- 1876 – South Carolina civil disturbances of 1876, South Carolina (race riots)
- 1877 – Widespread rioting occurred across the US as part of the Great Railroad Strike of 1877:
  - Baltimore railroad strike in Baltimore, Maryland
  - Shamokin uprising, Shamokin, Pennsylvania
- 1877 – San Francisco Riot of 1877 (anti-Chinese immigration)

=== 1880–1889 ===
- 1880 – Garret Mountain May Day riot, May 1, Paterson, New Jersey
- 1884 – Cincinnati riots of 1884, March 28–30, Cincinnati, Ohio
- 1885 – Rock Springs massacre, September 2, 1885, white miners attack Chinese miners; 28 killed, 15 injured, Rock Springs, Wyoming
- 1886 – Seattle riot of 1886, February 6–9, Seattle, Washington (anti-Chinese)
- 1886 – Haymarket riot, May 4, Chicago, Illinois (labor riot)
- 1886 – Bay View Massacre, May 4; 1400 workers march for eight hour work day; 7 killed and several more wounded after confrontation with National Guard. Milwaukee, Wisconsin
- 1887 – Reservoir war, April 25; a minor insurrection against the State of Ohio to destroy a canal feeder reservoir and other canal infrastructure. Antwerp, Ohio
- 1887 – Thibodaux Massacre, November 22–25; a racial attack mounted by white paramilitary groups in Thibodaux, Louisiana in November 1887 Thibodaux, Louisiana
- 1888 – Jaybird-Woodpecker War, 1888–90, two factions of Democratic Party fight for control, Fort Bend County, Texas
- 1889 – 1889 Forrest City riot, May 18, Forrest City, Arkansas (race riot)
- 1889 – 1889 Jesup riot, December 25, Jesup, Georgia

=== 1890–1899 ===
- 1891 – Hennessy Affair, New Orleans, Louisiana (anti-Italian)
- 1891 – Morewood massacre, United Mine Workers strike
- 1892 – Homestead strike, July 6, 1892, Homestead, Pennsylvania
- 1892–1893 – Mitcham War, Clarke County, Alabama; group of young rural farmers attack nearby businessmen, possibly motivated by 1892 election
- 1894 – May Day riots of 1894, May 1, Cleveland, Ohio (labor riot)
- 1894 – American Railway Union striking Pullman factory workers near Chicago, Illinois
- 1894 – Pullman strike American Railway Union strike versus federal troops, many cities west of Detroit
- 1894 – Bituminous Coal Miners' Strike, coal mining regions
- 1895 – New Orleans dockworkers riot, New Orleans, Louisiana
- 1897 – Lattimer massacre, September 1897, near Hazleton, Pennsylvania (labor massacre)
- 1898 – 1898 Tampa riot, June 6–7, Tampa, Florida; confrontation between white and segregated black soldiers
- 1898 – Battle of Virden, October 12, Coal strike; 11 killed, 35 wounded, Virden, Illinois
- 1898 – Phoenix election riot, November 8, Greenwood County, South Carolina (race riot)
- 1898 – Wilmington massacre, November 10, Wilmington, North Carolina (coordinated terrorist attack, race riot and coup d'état against blacks and reconstructionists)
- 1899 – Pana riot, April 10, Coal mine labor conflict; 7 killed, 6 wounded, Pana, Illinois
- 1899 – Coeur d'Alene, Idaho labor confrontation of 1899

== 20th century ==
=== 1900–1909 ===
- 1900 – Akron Riot of 1900, Akron, Ohio
- 1900 – New Orleans Riot (race riots)
- 1900 – 1900 Liberty County riot, August 18, Liberty County, Georgia
- 1900 – New York City Race Riot
- 1901 – Denver Riots, Denver, Colorado
- 1901 – Pierce City Riots, Pierce City, Missouri
- 1903 – Colorado Labor Wars, 1903–1904
- 1903 – Anthracite Coal Strike, Eastern Pennsylvania
- 1903 – Evansville Race Riot, Evansville, Indiana
- 1905 – 1905 Chicago teamsters' strike, April 7 – July 19, Conflict between the Teamsters Union and the Employers' Association of Chicago by the end, 21 people killed and 416 injured, mostly workers. Chicago, IL
- 1906 – Rioting and looting after the 1906 San Francisco earthquake
- 1906 – Atlanta Race Riot, Atlanta, Georgia
- 1907 – Bellingham riots, Bellingham, Washington (anti-Indian riots)
- 1908 – Springfield Race Riot, Springfield, Illinois (anti-Black riots)
- 1909 – Greek Town riot, February 21, South Omaha, Nebraska (anti-Greek riots)

=== 1910–1919 ===
- 1910 – Johnson–Jeffries riots (race riots)
- 1910–1919 – Bandit War Southern Texas
- 1910 – Philadelphia general strike (1910), Philadelphia, Pennsylvania
- 1910 – Slocum massacre, July 29–30, Slocum, Texas
- 1912 – Lawrence textile strike, Lawrence, Massachusetts (January to March)
- 1912 – Grabow riot (July 7); (labor riot)
- 1913 – Wheatland Riot, August 3, Wheatland, California (labor riot)
- 1913 – Paterson silk strike, February 25 – July 28 Paterson, New Jersey
- 1913 – Copper Country Strike of 1913–1914, Calumet, Michigan
- 1913 – Colorado Coalfield War, September 23 – April 29, 1914, Southern Colorado (labor riot)
- 1913 – Indianapolis streetcar strike of 1913, October 30 – November 7, Indianapolis, Indiana
- 1914 – Ludlow massacre, April 20, Ludlow, Colorado (labor massacre)
- 1914 – Macaroni Riots, August 29 – September 7, Federal Hill, Providence, Rhode Island
- 1916 – Preparedness Day bombing, July 22, San Francisco, California
- 1916 – Everett massacre, November 5, Everett, Washington (labor massacre)
- 1917 – Bath riots, January 28–30, El Paso, Texas
- 1917 – East St. Louis Race Riots, July 2, St. Louis, Missouri & East St. Louis, Illinois (race riots triggered by labor competition)
- 1917 – Chester race riot, July 25–29, Chester, Pennsylvania
- 1917 – Springfield Vigilante Riot, Springfield, Missouri
- 1917 – Green Corn Rebellion, August 3, A brief popular uprising advocating for the rural poor and against military conscription, Central Oklahoma
- 1917 – Houston Race riot, August 23, Houston, Texas
- 1917 – St. Paul Streetcar Riots, October and December, St. Paul, Minnesota
- 1918 – Detroit trolley riot, Detroit, Michigan
- 1918 – Philadelphia Race Riot, Philadelphia, Pennsylvania
- 1919 - United States strike wave from coast to coast, including New York to Seattle General Strike, to Los Angeles streetcar strike of 1919
- 1919 – Seattle General Strike, February 6–11, Seattle, Washington
- 1919 – May Day Riots, May 1, Cleveland, Ohio, Boston, Massachusetts, New York City, New York (state) (labor riots triggered by Eugene V. Debs' conviction, and American intervention in the Russian Civil War)
- 1919 – Red Summer, white riots against blacks. white supremacist terrorism and racial riots in almost 40 cities and an Arkansas rural county.
  - Blakeley, Georgia (February 8)
  - Memphis, Tennessee (March 14)
  - Morgan County, West Virginia (April 10)
  - Jenkins County, Georgia (April 13)
  - Charleston, South Carolina (May 10)
  - Sylvester, Georgia (May 10)
  - New London, Connecticut (May 29)
  - Putnam County, Georgia (May 27–29)
  - Monticello, Mississippi (May 31)
  - Memphis, Tennessee (June 13)
  - New London, Connecticut (June 13)
  - Annapolis, Maryland (June 27)
  - Macon, Mississippi (June 27)
  - Bisbee, Arizona (July 3)
  - Dublin, Georgia (July 6)
  - Philadelphia, Pennsylvania (July 7)
  - Coatesville, Pennsylvania (July 8)
  - Tuscaloosa, Alabama (July 9)
  - Longview, Texas (July 10–12)
  - Indianapolis, Indiana (July 14)
  - Port Arthur, Texas (July 15)
  - Washington, D.C. (July 19–24). 15 dead
  - Norfolk, Virginia (July 21)
  - New Orleans, Louisiana (July 23)
  - Darby, Pennsylvania (July 23)
  - Hobson City, Alabama (July 26)
  - Chicago, Illinois (July 27 – August 3), one of the largest episodes of anti-black violence in American history. 38 dead
  - Newberry, South Carolina (July 28)
  - Bloomington, Illinois (July 31)
  - Syracuse, New York (July 31)
  - Philadelphia, Pennsylvania (July 31)
  - Hattiesburg, Mississippi (August 4)
  - Texarkana, Texas riot of 1919 (August 6)
  - New York, New York (August 21)
  - Knoxville, Tennessee (August 30)
  - Ellenton, South Carolina (September 15–21)
  - Omaha, Nebraska (September 28–29)
  - Elaine, Arkansas (October 1–2)
  - Baltimore, Maryland (October 1–2)
  - Corbin, Kentucky (October 31, 1919)
  - Wilmington, Delaware (November 13)
- 1919 – Annapolis riot of 1919, June 27, Annapolis, Maryland
- 1919 – Boston Police Strike, September 9–11, Boston, Massachusetts
- 1919 – Steel Strike of 1919, September 22 – January 8 (1920) involved workers in Pueblo, Colorado; Chicago, Illinois, Wheeling, West Virginia; Johnstown, Pennsylvania; Cleveland, Ohio; Lackawanna, New York; and Youngstown, Ohio.
- 1919 – United Mine Workers coal strike of 1919, November 1 – December 10. largely in Pennsylvania, Illinois and West Virginia
- 1919 – Centralia Massacre, November 11, Centralia, Washington (skirmish between legion members and IWW caused 6 deaths)

=== 1920–1929 ===
- 1920 – 1920 Lexington riots, Feb 20, Lexington, KY
- 1920 – Battle of Matewan, May 20, arising from coal miners strike in Matewan, West Virginia (Ten dead)
- 1920 - Denver streetcar strike of 1920, August 1–7, 1920, Denver, Colorado
- 1920 – Ocoee massacre, November 2–3, Ocoee, Florida (massacre of 30-80 blacks on occasion of 1920 United States presidential election)
- 1921 – Tulsa race massacre, May 31 – June 1, Tulsa, Oklahoma
- 1921 – Battle of Blair Mountain, August–September, Logan County, West Virginia (an episode of the 1890-1930 Coal Wars). labor massacre in which up to 100 coal miners were killed
- 1922 – Herrin Massacre, June 21–22, Herrin, Illinois (labor massacre)
- 1922 – Straw Hat Riot, September 13–15, New York City, New York
- 1922 – Perry massacre, December 14–15, Perry, Florida
- 1923 – Rosewood massacre, January 1–7, Rosewood, Florida (race massacre - perhaps as many as 150 blacks killed, black-majority town of Rosewood destroyed.
- 1925 – Ossian Sweet incident, September, Detroit, Michigan
- 1927 – Yakima Valley Anti-Filipino Riot, November 8–11, Yakima Valley
- 1927 – Columbine Mine Massacre, November 21, Serene, Colorado
- 1929 – Loray Mill strike, Gastonia, North Carolina

=== 1930–1939 ===
- 1930 – Watsonville Riots, January 19–23, Watsonville, California (race riots)
- 1931 – Battle of Evarts, May 5, Harlan County, Kentucky (labor massacre)
- 1931 – The Housing Protests, August 3, Chicago, Illinois
- 1931 – Iowa Cow War, September 21–25, Cedar County, Iowa
- 1931 – Hawaii unrest, caused by Massie Trial—murder following an alleged rape
- 1931–1932 Harlan County War, Harlan County, Kentucky, Part of the Coal Wars and resulted in at least 5 total deaths.
- 1932 – Bonus Army March, Spring/Summer 1932, Washington, D.C.
- 1932 – Ford Hunger March, March 7, 3,000 unemployed workers march on Ford Motors, five are killed. River Rouge plant, Dearborn, Michigan
- 1934 – Minneapolis Teamsters Strike of 1934, Minneapolis, Minnesota
- 1934 – Auto-Lite strike, April 4 – June 3, the "Battle of Toledo" riot, Toledo, Ohio
- 1934 – 1934 West Coast Longshore Strike, May 9 – October 12, San Francisco Bay Area, California; Portland, Oregon; Seattle, Washington
- 1934 – Textile workers strike (1934)
- 1934 – Detroit World Series riot, October 10, Detroit, Michigan
- 1935 – Harlem Riot, March 19–20, New York City; first "modern" race riot due to attacks turning from against people to against property
- 1935 – Southern Tenant Farmers' Union Riot, Arkansas
- 1935 – Terre Haute General Strike, July 22–23, A labor dispute between an enameling company and a labor union led to a two-day general strike. Indiana National Guard was called out and martial law was declared by the Governor. The city was under a state of martial law for six months. Terre Haute, Indiana
- 1937 – Flint Sit-Down Strike, General Motors' Fisher Body Plant, Flint, Michigan
- 1937 – Battle of the Overpass, May 26, Dearborn, Michigan; members of United Auto Workers (UAW) clash with Henry Ford's security guards
- 1937 – Republic Steel Strike, May 30, Chicago, Illinois

=== 1940–1949 ===
- 1942 – Sojourner Truth Homes Riot, February 28, Detroit, Michigan (race riot)
- 1942 – 1942 Phoenix Thanksgiving Day riot, November 26, Phoenix, Arizona
- 1943 – Beaumont race riot of 1943, June, Beaumont, Texas
- 1943 – Zoot Suit Riots, July 3, Los Angeles, California (anti-Hispanic and anti-zoot suit)
- 1943 – Detroit race riot of 1943, June 20–21, Detroit, Michigan
- 1943 – Harlem riot of 1943, August 1–3, New York City, New York (race riot)
- 1946 – Columbia race riot of 1946, February 25–26, Columbia, Tennessee
- 1946 – Battle of Athens (1946), August, revolt by citizens against corrupt local government, McMinn County, Tennessee
- 1946 – Airport Homes race riots, Chicago, Illinois
- 1947 – Fernwood Park race riot, mid-August, Fernwood, Chicago, IL
- 1949 – Fairground Park riot, June 21, St. Louis Missouri (race riot)
- 1949 – Anacostia Pool Riot, June 29, Anacostia, Washington, D.C. (race riot)
- 1949 – Peekskill riots, Peekskill, New York (race riot)
- 1949 – Englewood race riot, November 8–12, Englewood, Chicago, IL

=== 1950–1959 ===
- 1950 – San Juan Nationalist revolt, Utuado Uprising, Jayuya Uprising, October 30, Various uprisings against United States Government rule during the Puerto Rican Nationalist Party Revolts of the 1950s in Puerto Rico
- 1951 – Cicero race riot of 1951, July 12, Cicero, Illinois
- 1956 – Mansfield School Integration Incident 400 pro-segregationists brandishing weapons and racist signage prevent 12 black children from entering Mansfield High School Mansfield, TX
- 1958 – Battle of Hayes Pond, January 18, Maxton, North Carolina, Armed confrontation between members of the NC Lumbee tribe and the KKK.
- 1959 – Harriett-Henderson Cotton Mills Strike Henderson, North Carolina
- 1959 – 1959 United Mine Workers strike, Coal miners strike in Eastern Kentucky

=== 1960–1969 ===
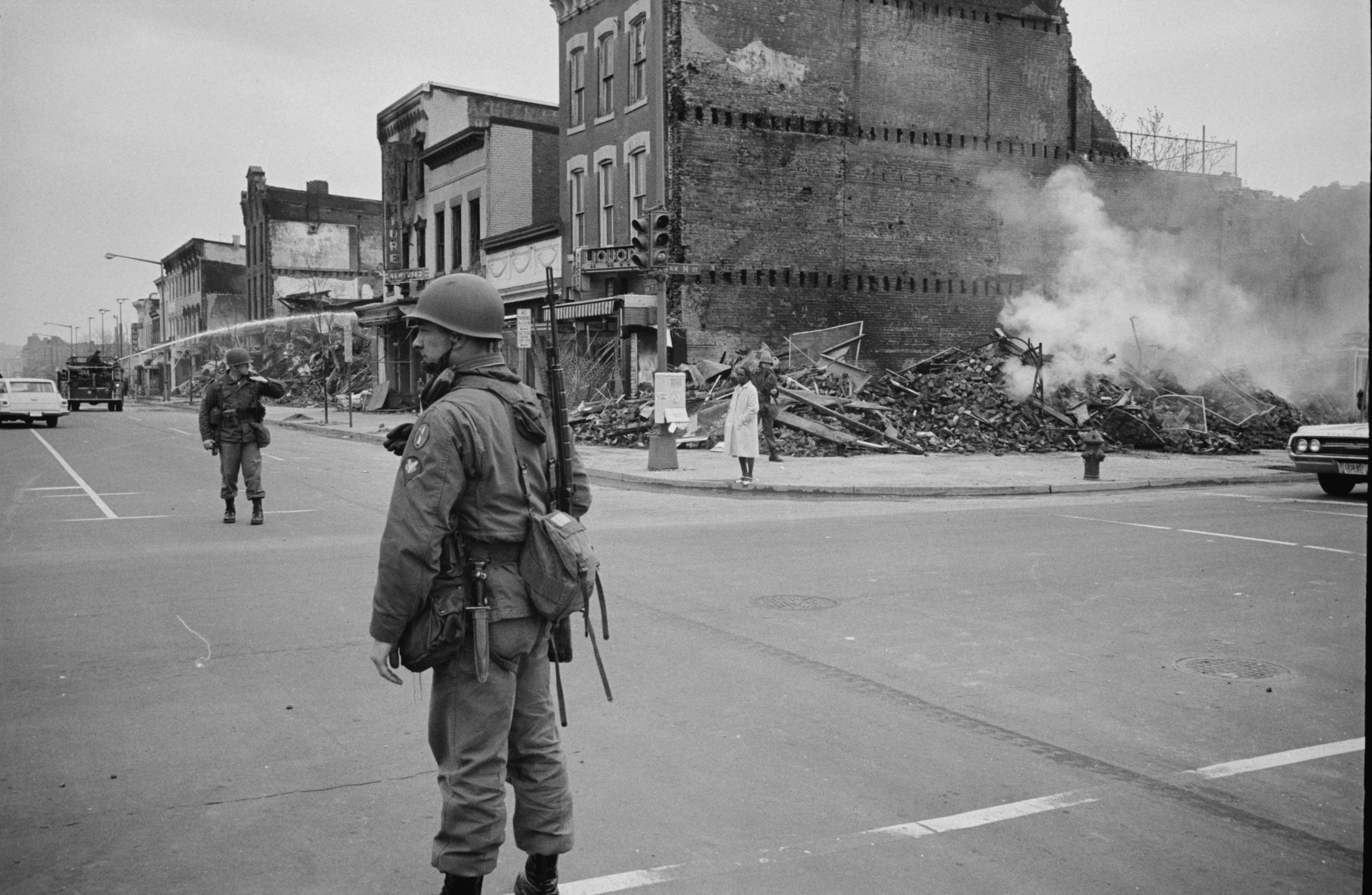
1968 Washington, D.C., riots

- 1960 – Biloxi wade-ins, April 24, Biloxi, Mississippi (Race riot)
- 1960 – HUAC riot, May 13, Students protest House Un-American Activities Committee hearings, 12 injured, 64 arrested, San Francisco, California
- 1960 – Newport Jazz Festival Riot, July 2, Newport, Rhode Island
- 1960 – El Cajon Boulevard Riot, August 20, San Diego, California
- 1960 – Ax Handle Saturday, August 27, Jacksonville, Florida (race riot)
- 1962 – Ole Miss riot 1962, September 3 – October 1, The University of Mississippi, Oxford, Mississippi (race riot caused by integration efforts to enroll James Meredith at the university)
- 1963 – Birmingham riot of 1963, May 11, Birmingham, Alabama (race riot)
- 1963 – Cambridge riot 1963, June 14, Cambridge, Maryland (race riot)
- 1964 – Chester school protests, April 2–26, Chester, Pennsylvania (racially motivated)
- 1964 – 1964 Monson Motor Lodge protests June thru August, St. Augustine, Florida (protests over segregation)
- 1964 – The July 16 killing of James Powell by police in the Yorkville neighborhood just south of East Harlem precipitates a string of race riots in July and August, including:
  - 1964 – Harlem Riot of 1964, July 16–22, New York City
  - 1964 – Rochester 1964 race riot, July 24–25, Rochester, New York
  - 1964 – Jersey City Riots, August 2–5, Jersey City, NJ, A disorderly conduct arrest set off accusations of police brutality and were followed by protests and riots. At least two residents were shot and several police and rioters were injured. By the end of the rioting on August 5, at least 46 people had been injured, 52 people were arrested and 71 stores and businesses were damaged.
  - 1964 – Dixmoor race riot, August 15–17, Dixmoor, Illinois
  - 1964 – Philadelphia 1964 race riot, August 28–30, Philadelphia
- 1965 – Selma to Montgomery marches, March 7–25, Alabama
- 1965 – Watts riots, August 11–17, Los Angeles, California (part of the ghetto riots)
- 1966 – Division Street riots, June 12–14, Humboldt Park, Chicago, Illinois (Puerto Rican riots)
- 1966 – Omaha riot of 1966, July 2, Omaha, Nebraska (race riots)
- 1966 – 1966 Chicago West-Side riots, July 12–15, Chicago, Illinois
- 1966 – 1966 New York City riots, July 14–20, New York City, New York, A riot broke out following a dispute between white and black youths. One person was killed and 53 injured. There were three arson incidents and 82 arrests.
- 1966 – Hough riots, July 18–24, Cleveland, Ohio
- 1966 – Compton's Cafeteria Riot, August, San Francisco, California
- 1966 – Perth Amboy riots, August 2–5, Perth Amboy, New Jersey, a riot broke out following the arrest of a Hispanic man for loitering. Hispanic residents also disliked being treated negatively by the police and being ignored by the community. Twenty-six injuries were reported (15 from law enforcement officers and 11 from civilians) and 43 arrests were made. Interference with firefighters occurred.
- 1966 – Marquette Park housing march, August 5, Chicago, Illinois
- 1966 – Waukegan riot, August 27, Waukegan, Illinois
- 1966 – Benton Harbor riots, August 30 – September 4, Benton Harbor, Michigan
- 1966 – 1966 Dayton race riot, September 1, Dayton, Ohio
- 1966 – Summerhill and Vine City Riots, September 6–8 Atlanta, Georgia
- 1966 – Hunters Point social uprising, September 27 – October 1 San Francisco, California
- 1966 – 1966 Clearwater riot, October 31, Clearwater, Florida
- 1966 – Sunset Strip curfew riots, November 12, various other flareups, basis for the song "For What It's Worth (Buffalo Springfield song)", West Hollywood, California
- 1967 – Long Hot Summer of 1967 refers to a year in which 159 race riots, almost all African-American, erupted across the United States, including:
  - 1967 – 1967 Louisville riots, April 11–mid-June, Louisville, Kentucky
  - 1967 – 1967 Massillion riot, April 17, Massillon, Ohio, 17 arrests were made as black and white teenagers fought each other.
  - 1967 – 1967 Jackson riot, May 12, Jackson, Mississippi
  - 1967 – 1967 Texas Southern University riot, May 16, Houston, Texas
  - 1967 – 1967 Boston riot, June 2–5, Boston, Massachusetts
  - 1967 – 1967 Clearwater riot, June 3 or 4, Clearwater, Florida, a riot started after a white police officer tried to assist an African-American officer break up a fight between two African-American men.
  - 1967 – 1967 Philadelphia riot, June 11, Philadelphia, Pennsylvania, began after a dispute involving a rug. Bottle and brick throwing were reported in an African-American neighborhood and 4 police officers were injured.
  - 1967 – 1967 Prattville riot, June 11, Prattville, Alabama, riots following the arrest of Stokely Carmichael arrest. Four people were wounded and 10 arrested.
  - 1967 – 1967 Tampa riots, June 11–14, Tampa, Florida
  - 1967 – Avondale riots, June 12–15, Cincinnati, Ohio
  - 1967 – 1967 Maywood riots, June 14, Maywood, Illinois, riots began after young African-American men and women demanded a swimming pool in the historically neglected neighborhood.
  - 1967 – 1967 Atlanta riots, June 17–20, Atlanta, Georgia
  - 1967 – Buffalo riot of 1967, June 27, Buffalo, New York
  - 1967 – 1967 Waterloo riots, July 8–9, Waterloo, Iowa, riots started after a young African-American man was arrested for assault and battery of an elderly white man sweeping the sidewalk in front of his business.
  - 1967 – 1967 Kansas City riot, July 9, Kansas City, Missouri, 1 person was injured and 11 arrested.
  - 1967 – 1967 Newark riots, July 12–17, Newark, New Jersey
  - 1967 – 1967 Hartford riot, July 14, Hartford, Connecticut
  - 1967 – 1967 Plainfield riots, July 14–21, Plainfield, New Jersey
  - 1967 – 1967 Fresno riot, July 15–17, Fresno, California, riots were sparked after the loss of a local youth job program used extensively by African-American and Latino youths. Two people were injured, 27 arrested and 46 cases of arson were reported.
  - 1967 – Cairo riot, July 17, Cairo, Illinois
  - 1967 – 1967 New Brunswick riots, July 17–18, New Brunswick, New Jersey, riots began after a group of roughly 200 African-American teenagers protested against unfair treatment in local public schools, unemployment, the closing of a social club and long-term police brutality. Protesters looted stores in the city's business district, specifically targeting those considered to treat black customers unfairly. By 2 AM 32 adults and 18 juveniles, all of them black, had been arrested for looting, possession of stolen property, carrying weapons, and loitering. In response, Mayor Patricia Sheehan declared a 10 PM curfew. On June 18, a crowd of 200 people gathered where 75 heavily armed police officers were barricading a route to the downtown business district. The protesters promised to disperse once the police were removed, and they did.
  - 1967 – 1967 Minneapolis riot, July 19–24, Minneapolis, Minnesota
  - 1967 – 1967 Wadesboro riot, July 22, Wadesboro, North Carolina, after a black person was shot and run over by a car, local black residents went on a rock throwing spree.
  - 1967 – 1967 New York City riot, July 22–25, East Harlem & South Bronx, New York City, a riot began in East Harlem after a policeman killed a Puerto Rican he claimed was holding a knife and threatening him. The riot later spread to the South Bronx.
  - 1967 – 1967 Birmingham riot, July 23, Birmingham, Alabama, 11 people were injured and over 70 arrested with the National Guard being called in to assist the police.
  - 1967 – 1967 Toledo Riot, July 23, Toledo, Ohio
  - 1967 – 1967 Rochester riots, July 23–24, Rochester, New York a riot began following police shutting down a drag race. One person was killed, 9 injured, 146 arson cases reported and 69 people arrested. The New York State Police and the National Guard would be called up.
  - 1967 – 1967 Lima riots, July 23–26, Lima, Ohio riots began following the killing of a white man by a black man. Two cases of arson were reported and 23 arrests made.
  - 1967 – 1967 Detroit riot, July 23–29, Detroit, Michigan
  - 1967 – Cambridge riot of 1967, July 24, a.k.a. the H. Rap Brown riot, Cambridge, Maryland
  - 1967 – 1967 Waukegan riots, July 24–25, Waukegan, Illinois
  - 1967 – 1967 Grand Rapids riot, July 25–27, Grand Rapids, Michigan, a riot began following the Grand Rapids Police raiding and shutting down an illegal bar. As the patrons stood on the street police attempted to arrest a young man for stealing a car. The young man had a broken arm in a cast and the onlookers accused the police of brutality in the arrest. The next night rioters began using Molotov cocktails to burn down businesses and houses. White vigilantes took to the streets to counter the protesters. Gov. George Romney ordered the National Guard to intervene. By the end of the protests there were 44 injuries, no deaths and 30 arrests.
  - 1967 – 1967 Saginaw riot, July 26, Saginaw, Michigan
  - 1967 – 1967 Albany riot, Albany, New York, July 27–28, riots began in response to a rumor of two deaths at the hands of the police. Forty-one people were arrested and there were 3 arson cases.
  - 1967 – 1967 Wilmington riots, July 28–30, Wilmington, Delaware, 13 were injured, 14 arson cases and 325 arrests were reported during the riots.
  - 1967 – 1967 Rockford riots, July 29–30, Rockford, Illinois, 11 people injured and 44 arrested.
  - 1967 – Albina Riot of 1967, July 30, Portland, Oregon
  - 1967 – Milwaukee riot, July 30, Milwaukee, Wisconsin
  - 1967 – 1967 Riviera Beach riot, July 30–31, Riviera Beach & West Palm Beach, Florida
  - 1967 – 1967 Providence riots, July 31 – August 1, 23 people were injured and 14 arrests were made.
  - 1967 – 1967 New Haven riots, August 19–23, a riot began following a white restaurant owner shooting at a Puerto Rican man who had come at him with a knife. Over 200 Connecticut State Troopers would be called in to assist the city's police department that had 430 officers. Three people were injured, 679 arrested and 90 cases of arson reported.
- 1967 – 1967 Century City demonstration, anti-war protesters in Los Angeles are beaten by police.
- 1968 – Orangeburg Massacre, S.C. State Univ., February 8, Orangeburg, South Carolina
- 1968 – Memphis sanitation strike riot, March 28, Memphis, Tennessee
- 1968 – Assassination of Martin Luther King, Jr., April 4, Memphis, Tennessee, precipitates all April 4–14 riots, including:
  - 1968 – 1968 Detroit riot, April 4–5, Detroit, Michigan
  - 1968 – 1968 New York City riots, April 4–5, New York City, New York
  - 1968 – 1968 Tallahassee riots, April 4–7, Tallahassee, Florida, One person killed and five injured.
  - 1968 – 1968 Washington, D.C. riots, April 4–8, Washington, D.C.
  - 1968 – 1968 Boston riots, April 4–9, Boston, Massachusetts, 34 injuries were reported, 16 cases of arson and 87 arrests.
  - 1968 – 1968 Charlotte riots, April 4–12, Charlotte, North Carolina, seven injuries were reported; 29 cases of arson and 30 arrests.
  - 1968 – 1968 Chicago riots, West Side Riots, April 5–7, Chicago, Illinois
  - 1968 – 1968 Norfolk riots, April 5–10, Norfolk, Virginia
  - 1968 – 1968 Pittsburgh riots, April 5–11, Pittsburgh, Pennsylvania
  - 1968 – 1968 Jacksonville riots, April 6–11, Jacksonville, Florida one person killed and 15 injured, with 12 of those caused by police.
  - 1968 – Baltimore riot of 1968, April 6–14, Baltimore, Maryland
  - 1968 – Avondale riot of 1968, April 8, Cincinnati, Ohio
  - 1968 – 1968 Kansas City riot, April 9, Kansas City, Missouri
  - 1968 – Wilmington Riot of 1968, April 9–10, Wilmington, Delaware
  - 1968 – Trenton Riot of 1968, April 9–11, Trenton, New Jersey
- 1968 – Columbia University protests of 1968, April 23, New York City, New York
- 1968 – Louisville riots of 1968, May 27, Louisville, Kentucky
- 1968 – 1968 Paterson riots, July 2–7, Paterson, New Jersey riots began following rumors a man was killed by the police while being arrested. One hundred and fifty people were arrested and 86 cases of arson reported.
- 1968 – 1968 Coney Islands Riots, July 19–22, Coney Island, New York City, New York, the cause of the riots are unclear. Five police officers were injured and eight people were arrested by the police in a neighborhood that was predominantly black and Puerto Rican.
- 1968 – Akron riot, July 17–23, Akron, Ohio
- 1968 – Glenville Shootout, July 23–28, Cleveland, Ohio
- 1968 – 1968 Richmond riots. July 25–30, Richmond, California riots broke out after a 15-year-old black male suspect in a car robbery was shot by police. Seventeen arson cases were reported and 564 people arrested.
- 1968 – 1968 Miami riot, August 7–8, Miami, Florida
- 1968 – 1968 Democratic National Convention protests, including the police riots of August 27–28, Chicago, Illinois
- 1969 – Zip to Zap riot, May 9–11, Zap, North Dakota
- 1969 – People's Park Riots, May, Berkeley, California
- 1969 – 1969 Greensboro uprising, May 21–25, Greensboro, North Carolina
- 1969 – Cairo disorders, May–December, Cairo, Illinois
- 1969 – Stonewall riots, June 28 – July 2, New York City, New York
- 1969 – 1969 York Race Riot, July 17–24, York, Pennsylvania
- 1969 – Days of Rage, October 8–11, Weathermen riot in Chicago, Illinois
- 1969 – Altamont Free Concert, December 6, concert turned near-riot in the Altamont Speedway outside of Tracy, California.

=== 1970—1979 ===
- 1970 — San Francisco Police Department Park Station bombing, February 16, San Francisco, CA
- 1970 — University of Puerto Rico riot, March 4—11, at least one killed, Río Piedras, Puerto Rico
- 1970 — Coachella Riots, April 5, Coachella, California, started after a Brown Beret member disrupted a dance by getting on the stage and calling for "action." Three people were arrested, four police officers injured and the mayor's house was burned down.
- 1970 — Student strike of 1970, May 1970
- 1970 — Kent State riots/shootings, May 4, 1970, four killed, Kent, Ohio
- 1970 — New Haven Green Disorders, Yale University, May 1970, New Haven, Connecticut
- 1970 — Augusta Riot, May 11—13, Augusta, Georgia
- 1970 — Hard Hat Riot, Wall Street, May 8, New York City
- 1970 — Jackson State killings, May 14—15, two killed, Jackson, Mississippi
- 1970 — Stoneman Meadow Riot, July 4, 1970, Yosemite, California
- 1970 — 1970 Asbury Park race riots, July 4—10, Asbury Park, New Jersey
- 1970 — 1970 Memorial Park riot, August 24—27, Royal Oak, Michigan
- 1970 — Sterling Hall bombing, Univ. of Wisc., August 24, one killed, Madison, Wisconsin
- 1970 — Chicano Moratorium riot, August 29, Los Angeles, California
- 1971 — Wilmington riot 1971, February 9, Wilmington, North Carolina
- 1971 — May Day protests 1971, May 3, Washington, D.C.
- 1971 – Newton, MA Draft Board Protest 1971 May 3, – 55 arrested
- 1971 – Newton, MA Charges against the 55 Arrested at May 3 Draft Board Protest dismissed by Judge Francis Larkin. Protest action was determined by Court to be Civil Disturbance protected as Free Speech by the First Amendment of US Constitution.
- 1971 — Albuquerque riots, June 13—15, Albuquerque, New Mexico. The Albuquerque Police Department arrested several Chicano teens for underage drinking at Albuquerque's Roosevelt Park. Several hundred people in the park for a concert viewed this as motivated by anti-Spanish sentiment, and the next 30 hours would be marked by violent conflict. Police fired their guns and deployed tear gas as the crowd overturned a police car and set an Albuquerque Public Schools administration building on fire, after which APD officers retreated until reinforcement from the New Mexico National Guard arrived. Some 600 people were arrested, dozens injured and approximately $3,000,000 of damage to nearby buildings assessed. The group 'Las Gorras Negras por La Justicia' claimed some involvement.
- 1971 — Colonia riots, July 18—19, Colonia, California 38 people arrested.
- 1971 — Camden riots, August 1971, Camden, New Jersey
- 1971 — Santa Fe Fiestas riot, September 7, 1971, Santa Fe, New Mexico, civil disturbances and vandalism during annual Fiestas event. Police fired tear gas into crowd. One hundred National Guardsman were called to protect buildings and keep order. 23 people were arrested.
- 1971 — Attica Prison uprising, September 9—13, at least 39 killed, Attica, New York
- 1972 — Pharr riots, February 6, Pharr, Texas started after police attacked a crowd protesting police brutality and killed one person.
- 1972 — Youth riot, April 23, Santa Paula, California 35–40 arrests.
- 1972 — Gainesville riots, May 12, 1972, Gainesville, Florida, anti-war protesters and police clashed for several hours. One hundred and seventy-four people were arrested and 24 injured.
- 1972 — Puerto Rican riot, July 1972, Boston, Massachusetts
- 1973 — Wounded Knee incident, February 27 — May 8, Wounded Knee, South Dakota
- 1973 — Shooting of Clifford Glover Riot, April 23, Rioting broke out in South Jamaica, Queens after an undercover police officer shot and killed a 10-year-old African-American youth. New York, New York
- 1974 — SLA Shootout, May 17, Los Angeles, California
- 1974 — Ten-Cent Beer Night, June 4, Cleveland, Ohio
- 1974 — Baltimore police strike, July, Baltimore, Maryland
- 1974 — Boston desegregation busing riots: at least 40 riots throughout Boston, Massachusetts from September 1974 through September 1976.
- 1975 — Livernois–Fenkell riot, July 1975, Detroit, Michigan
- 1976 — Escambia High School riots, February 5, Pensacola, Florida
- 1976 — Marquette Park unrest, June—August, Chicago, Illinois
- 1977 — Humboldt Park riot, June 5—6, Chicago, Illinois
- 1977 — New York City Blackout riot 1977, July 13—14, New York City, New York
- 1978 — Fireman Strike Arson, July 2, 1978, Memphis, TN, over 200 arsons occurred in Memphis after the city's policemen and firefighters went on strike
- 1978 — Moody Park riot, May 5, 1978, Houston, Texas
- 1979 — Herman Hill riot, April 15, Wichita, Kansas
- 1979 — White Night riots, May 1979, San Francisco, California
- 1979 — Decatur, Alabama riot, May 26, Ku Klux Klan-led attack on civil rights marchers results in 3 people being shot and several more wounded
- 1979 — Levittown Gas Riot, June 23—24, Thousands rioted in response to increased gasoline prices in the U.S., 198 arrested, 44 police and 200 rioters injured. Gas stations were damaged and cars set on fire, Levittown, Pennsylvania
- 1979 — Greensboro massacre, November 3, Shootout between members of the Communist Workers Party and members of the Ku Klux Klan and the American Nazi Party. Greensboro, North Carolina.

=== 1980–1989 ===
- 1980 – Idabel riot, January, Idabel Oklahoma, Two people are killed in rioting following the killing of a 15-year-old black youth
- 1980 – New Mexico State Penitentiary riot, February 2–3, Santa Fe, New Mexico
- 1980 – 21st street riot, April 22, Wichita, KS, Black rioters battled police and attacked passing motorists after an alleged incident of police brutality against a black man. Over 60 people were injured and 24 people were arrested.
- 1980 – Wrightsville, Georgia unrest, April–May, extended period of racially motivated brawls, shootings and arsons between Blacks and Whites,
- 1980 – Miami riot 1980, May 17–19, Miami, Florida
- 1980 – Chattanooga riots, July, Chattanooga, Tennessee, rioting in Chattanooga after two Ku Klux Klansmen were acquitted of shooting four black women by an all-white jury. 8 police officers were shot.
- 1982 – 1982 Overtown riot, December 28, Miami, Florida
- 1984 – Tower Hill riot, Lawrence, Massachusetts
- 1985 – 1985 MOVE bombing, May 13, Philadelphia, Pennsylvania
- 1986 – Marquette Park KKK rally, June 28, Chicago, Illinois
- 1987 – 1987 Tampa riots, Tampa, Florida
- 1988 – Tompkins Square Park riot, August 6–7, New York City
- 1988 – Cedar Grove, Shreveport, Louisiana
- 1989 – 1989 Miami riot, January 16–18, four days of rioting in the Overtown neighborhood began after a police officer shot a man driving a motorcycle who was fleeing another officer. He crashed and his passenger was also killed. Miami, Florida
- 1989 – 1989 Tampa riot, February 1, Tampa, Florida a riot began following the death of an African American man while in police custody. The disturbance lasted for an hour with 150 youths participating. A grocery store was looted and set on fire. Four police officers, including one involved in the initial arrest, were injured.

=== 1990–1999 ===
- 1990 – 1990 Wynwood riots, December 3, 1990, Miami, Florida, Started after the acquittal of police officers who had beaten a drug dealer named Leonardo Mercado to death in December 1988.
- 1991 – 1991 Washington, DC riot, Mount Pleasant riot, May 5–9, Washington, D.C.
- 1991 – Overtown, Miami, June 28, Riot in the heavily Black section of Overtown against Cuban Americans. Miami, Florida
- 1991 – Crown Heights riot, August 1991, Brooklyn, New York
- 1992 – 1992 Los Angeles riots, April–May 1992, Los Angeles, California
- 1992 – West Las Vegas riots, April 29, Las Vegas, Nevada
- 1992 – 1992 Washington Heights riots, July 4–7, Manhattan, New York, Dominican community
- 1992 – Patrolmen's Benevolent Association Riot, September 16, New York city, police riot against proposal for civilian oversight
- 1996 – St. Petersburg, Florida Riot 1996, October 1996, St. Petersburg, Florida
- 1997 – North Hollywood shootout, February 1997, Los Angeles, California
- 1999 – Michigan State University student riot, April 1999, East Lansing, Michigan
- 1999 – Woodstock '99 music festival incident, July 1999, Rome, New York
- 1999 – WTO Meeting of 1999, "The Battle of Seattle", November 1999, Seattle, Washington

== 21st century ==
=== 2000–2009 ===
- 2000 – Elián González affair, Miami, Florida
- 2000 – Firing of Bob Knight, September 11, 2,000–10,000 Indiana Hoosiers Men's Basketball fans participate in vandalism and protests, Bloomington, Indiana
- 2000 – Puerto Rican Day Parade attacks, June 11, Central Park, New York City
- 2000 – Brooks Brothers riot, November 22, Miami-Dade County, Florida
- 2001 – Seattle Mardi Gras riot, February 27, Seattle, Washington
- 2001 – 2001 Cincinnati Riots, April 10–12, Cincinnati, Ohio
- 2003 – Benton Harbor riot, June 2003, Benton Harbor, Michigan
- 2003 – Miami FTAA Protests, November 2003, Miami, Florida
- 2005 – Civil disturbances and military action in New Orleans after Hurricane Katrina, August – September, New Orleans, Louisiana
- 2005 – 2005 Toledo riot, October 15, Toledo, Ohio
- 2006 – San Bernardino punk riot, March 4, San Bernardino, California
- 2007 – The Los Angeles May Day mêlée, May 1, Los Angeles, California
- 2009 – Riots against BART Police shooting of Oscar Grant, January 7, 120 arrested, Oakland, California
- 2009 – Akron riots, March 14, 2009, 7 arrested; and July 2009, unknown number arrested, Akron, Ohio
- 2009 – 2009 G20 Pittsburgh summit protests, September 24–25, 193 arrested

=== 2010–2019 ===
- 2010 – Springfest riot, April 10
- 2010 – Santa Cruz May Day riot, May 1
- 2010 – Oakland protest riot, November 5, protesting sentence of former BART officer in shooting of Oscar Grant on New Years Day 2009; see BART Police shooting of Oscar Grant. Oakland, California
- 2011 – Madison Occupation. Protestors storm and occupy the Wisconsin state capitol building for 18 days.
- 2011 – Occupy Wall Street (Brooklyn Bridge protests).
- 2011 – Occupy Oakland Oakland protests riots. October.
- 2012 – Kentucky Wildcats supporters in Lexington, Kentucky
- 2012 – NATO 2012 Chicago Summit, May.
- 2012 – Anaheim police shooting and protests, July 28.
- 2013 – Flatbush Riots, March 11, Riots in Brooklyn, New York after the death of Kimani Gray who was shot and killed by NYPD.
- 2014 – Bundy Standoff, April 5–May,
- 2014 – Ferguson unrest, Ferguson and St. Louis, Missouri, August 10 and November 24. Following the shooting death of Michael Brown by a Ferguson police officer
- 2014 – New York, New York, and Berkeley, California.
- 2014 – 2014 Oakland riots, November–December,
- 2015 – 2015 Baltimore protests, April 25–28 following the death of Freddie Gray while in police custody.
- 2016 – Occupation of the Malheur National Wildlife Refuge, January–February, One killed and several dozen arrested at Malheur National Wildlife Refuge, Oregon.
- 2016 – Donald Trump Chicago rally protest, March 11.
- 2016 – Democracy Spring rally in April. March to Washington D.C. and sit-ins lead to arrests.
- 2016 – 2016 Sacramento riot, June 26, A confrontation between white nationalists and left-wing counter protesters at the California State Capitol.
- 2016 – Widespread protests erupt in response to two deaths at the hands of police, the Shooting of Alton Sterling and shooting of Philando Castile. New York City, Chicago, St. Paul, Baton Rouge, and other cities.
- 2016 – Milwaukee riots, Sherman Park, August 13–15. Milwaukee, Wisconsin, sparked by the fatal police shooting of 23-year-old Sylville Smith.
- 2016 – Charlotte riot, September 20–21, Protests and riots break out in response to the shooting of Keith Lamont Scott by a Charlotte police officer.
- 2016 – Dakota Access Pipeline protests, 411 protesters arrested.
- 2016 - National anthem kneeling protests, in August, predominantly African American athletes kneeled during the national anthem against oppression of people of color
- 2017 – Berkeley, California, February 1, civil unrest ensued at UC Berkeley
- 2017 – Anaheim, California protests, February 21, protesters demonstrated after a police officer grabbed a 13-year-old boy and fired a single shot.
- 2017 – May Day, in Olympia, Washington and Portland, Oregon, protestors demonstrated for workers rights.
- 2017 – Unite the Right rally, Charlottesville, Virginia, August 11–12, opposition to the removal of a statue of Confederate general Robert E. Lee
- 2018 – March for Our Lives, March 24, Student-led protests calling for gun control.
- 2019 – Memphis riot, June 13, following the fatal shooting of Brandon Webber by U.S. Marshals, Memphis, TN.

=== 2020–present ===
- 2020 – New York City 'FTP' protests, on November 4, 2019 November 22, January 31, 2020, and June 4, opposing Transit Police attempts to block fare evasion.
- 2020 – University of Dayton closure riot, March 11, A riot broke out following the university's announcement of a temporary closure due to COVID-19.

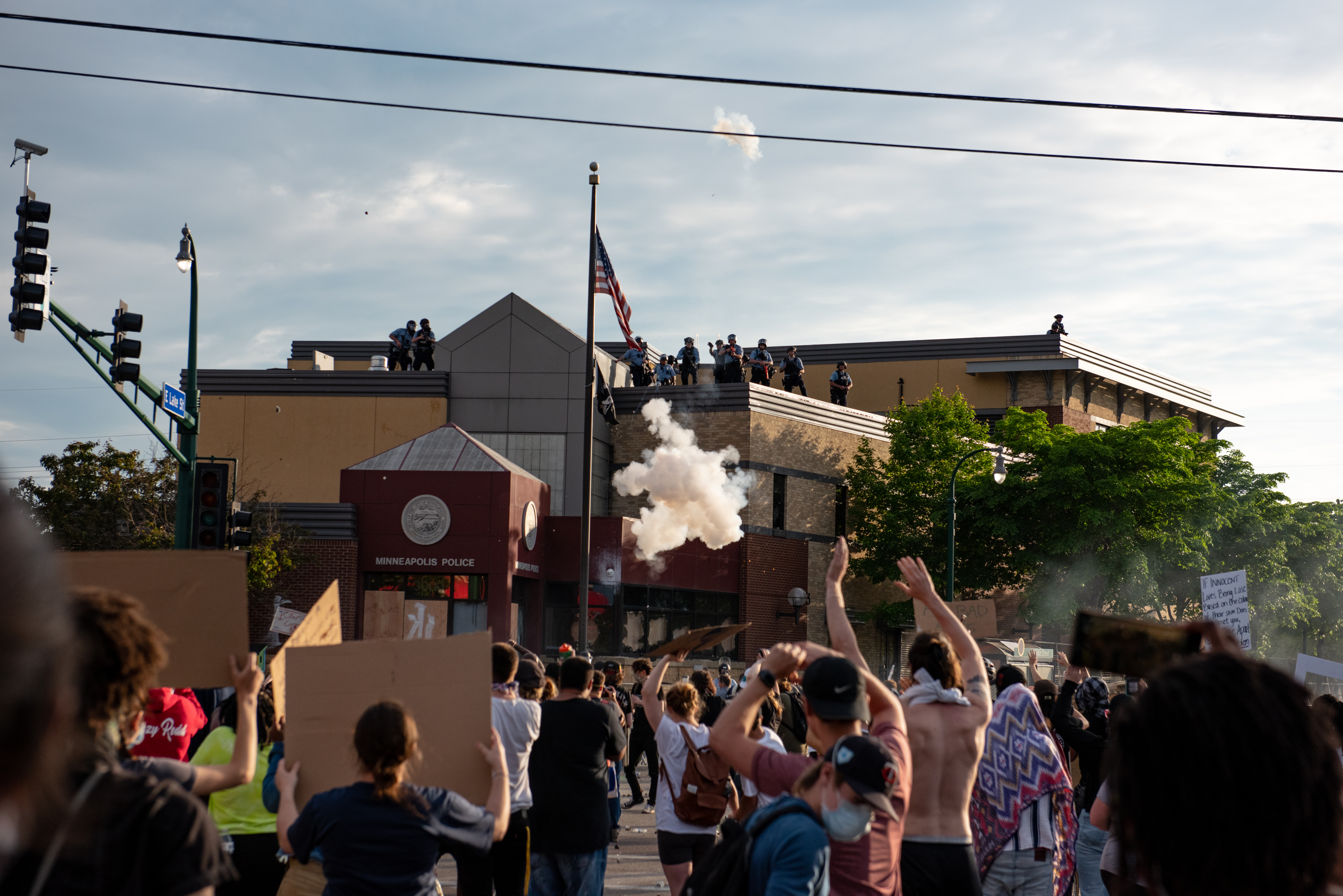
Protesters surround a police precinct in Minneapolis during the George Floyd protests, part of a larger wave of civil unrest in 2020 and 2021.

- 2020 – George Floyd protests, May 26
- 2020 – Kenosha unrest, August 23–28, Kenosha, Wisconsin
- 2020 – Minneapolis false rumors riot
- 2020 – Jewish Protest, October 7–8, In Brooklyn, New York, members of the Orthodox Jewish community protested over new COVID-19 restrictions. Minor fires were set, masks were burned, and journalist Jacob Kornbluh was attacked.
- 2020 – Philadelphia riot, October 26 – November 4, Caused by the Killing of Walter Wallace by Philadelphia police.
- 2020 – 2020–21 United States election protests, November 3 – March 2021
- 2021 – January 6 United States Capitol attack
- 2021 – Daunte Wright protests, April 11 – February 18, 2022
- May 2021–June 2021, amid the 2021 Israel–Palestine crisis, the United States saw a rise in antisemitism, Anti-Arab racism and violence, as both pro-Israel and pro-Palestine protesters took to the streets of major U.S. cities.
- 2021 – 2021 Uptown Minneapolis unrest, June 3–7
- 2022 – United States abortion protests (2022-present)
- 2021–2023 – Stop Cop City
- August 4, 2023 – Union Square riot
- September 26–27, 2023 – Philadelphia experienced two nights of mass looting across the city.
- October 2023–present – Gaza war protests in the United States
- April 2024 pro-Palestinian Tax Day protests
- 2024 – 2024 pro-Palestinian protests on university campuses
- 2024 – Stop Cop City Protests
- April 2025 – Hands Off protests
- June 2025 – June 2025 Los Angeles protests, as part of the 2025 protests against mass deportation
- June 2025 – 2025 Portland, Oregon protests around the ICE field office
- 2026 – Nationwide protests in response to the killings of Renée Good and Alex Pretti by ICE agents in Minneapolis
- May 2026 – Newark New Jersey Delaney Hall protests, as part of the 2026 U.S. immigration enforcement protests

== See also ==
- Insurrection Act of 1807 – United States law
- Know-Nothing Riots in United States politics
- List of conflicts in North America
- List of coups and coup attempts by country § United States
- List of incidents of civil unrest in Colonial North America
- List of massacres in the United States
- List of protest marches on Washington, DC
- List of rebellions in the United States – All rebellions in the United States
- List of riots – Notable incidents of civil disorder worldwide
- List of violent spectator incidents in sports
- List of worker deaths in United States labor disputes
- Lists of incidents of unrest and violence in the United States by city
  - List of incidents of political violence in Washington, D.C.
- Mass racial violence in the United States – For race riots
- Political violence in the United States
