= Oakland riots =

Oakland riots may refer to:

- 2003 riots following Super Bowl XXXVII in 2003, Oakland, California
- 2009 riots connected to the BART Police shooting of Oscar Grant, in Oakland, California
- 2009 riots following Super Bowl XLIII, in Oakland (Pittsburgh).
- 2011-2012 disturbances related to the Occupy Oakland protests
- 2013 unrest following the acquittal of George Zimmerman
- 2014 riots following the decision to not charge a police officer in the shooting of Michael Brown.
- 2016 riots following the election of Donald Trump as President of the United States.
- 2020 protests and riots following the murder of George Floyd in Minnesota
