= Annapolis riot of 1919 =

- Part of Red Summer
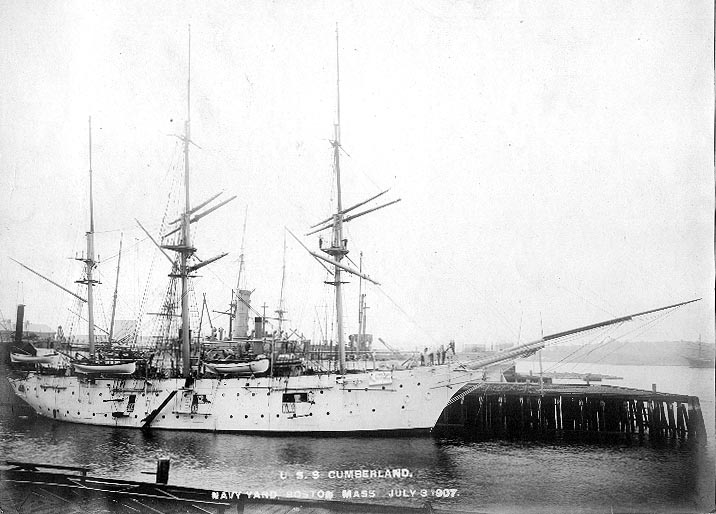
- A photo taken in 1907 of the training ship USS Cumberland
- Date: June 27, 1919
- Location: Annapolis, Maryland, United States
- Participants: United States Navy
- Injuries: 2 gunshot injuries

The Annapolis riot of 1919 took place on June 27, 1919, between midnight and 1 AM, in Annapolis, Maryland. A mob of African-American bluejackets from the U.S. Navy fought local Annapolis African-Americans.

== Riot ==
The United States Naval Academy was founded in 1845 on the site of Fort Severn, and occupied an area of land reclaimed from the Severn River next to the Chesapeake Bay. In the summer of 1919 about 40 African-American bluejackets from the U.S. Navy, "the majority of them in training to be mess attendants" and attached to the training ship USS Cumberland, brawled with twice that number of local black residents. There was no white involvement in the riot.

The troubles started on July 22. According to The Washington Times, the issue was that the "jackies" had been "molesting a number of colored women". On the night of June 27 the local black community were "lying in wait" on Acton Lane, a short thoroughfare leading from West street, for the Navy men, who were described as the aggressors. Some of the combatants were armed with handguns and there were considerable shooting and throwing of bricks and other missiles; at one point it threatened to expand into a larger riot. Two people were later treated for minor gunshot wounds. Several windows were broken and there were other minor damage. The Navy men realizing they were outnumbered, withdrew. Two men were arrested with difficulty by a policeman who happened to be on the scene, "whose own life was in jeopardy." They were turned over to the Naval authorities, who sent a provost guard into the city when informed of the troubles, and promised a full investigation, for which reason the city police took no action.

There were instances of the white mobs of US Navy men attacking local black communities like during the New London Naval riots of 1919. The Annapolis riot is commonly described as part of the Red Summer disturbances of 1919, but it is quite different from the white against black rioting that was the usual pattern.

== See also ==
- New London Naval riots of 1919
- Mass racial violence in the United States
- List of incidents of civil unrest in the United States
