= List of incidents of civil unrest in Atlanta =

The following is a list of incidents of civil unrest in Atlanta.

Year	Date	Main article	Notes
1863	March 18		Part of the Southern bread riots during the American Civil War. A mob of 10 to 20 women raided a store and stole foodstuff. The food riot is referred to as the "Atlanta Bacon Riot of 1863" by the Atlanta History Center.
1906	September 22–24	1906 Atlanta race massacre	Part of the nadir of American race relations. A mob of roughly 10,000 white Americans attacked African Americans following reports of several alleged assaults by black men on white women. An estimated 27 to 42 people died.
1956	December 2–3		Approximately 2,000 Georgia Tech students rioted after Governor Marvin Griffin requested the Georgia Board of Regents to bar the Georgia Tech Yellow Jackets football team from competing in the 1956 Sugar Bowl against an integrated opponent.
1967	June 17–20	1967 Atlanta riots	Part of the long, hot summer of 1967. Rioting occurred after the arrest of activist Stokely Carmichael, resulting in 1 death and 3 injured.
1987	November 23 – December 3	Atlanta prison riots	Approximately 1,400 Cuban inmates at the United States Penitentiary, Atlanta, participated in a prison riot over fear of deportation to Cuba. One inmate died during the riot.
2020	May 29 – June	George Floyd protests in Atlanta	Part of the George Floyd protests in Georgia.
2023	January 21		Part of the Stop Cop City movement. Rioting occurred in downtown Atlanta after a vigil was held in honor of Tortuguita, an activist who was killed several days earlier. Six people were arrested.

== See also ==
- List of incidents of civil unrest in the United States
- Lists of incidents of unrest and violence in the United States by city
