= 1968 Pittsburgh riots =

Series of urban disturbances that erupted in Pittsburgh on April 5, 1968

- Part of the King assassination riots
- Date: April 5–11, 1968
- Location: Pittsburgh, Pennsylvania
- Caused by: Assassination of Martin Luther King, Jr.
- Result: Property destroyed, order restored

Parties
Rioters	Pittsburgh Police Department; Pennsylvania National Guard

Casualties
- Death: 1
- Injuries: 36
- Arrested: 1,000

The 1968 Pittsburgh riots were a series of urban disturbances that erupted in Pittsburgh on April 5, 1968, following the assassination of Martin Luther King. Pittsburgh, along with 110 other cities, burned for several days and 3,600 National Guardsmen were needed to quell the disorder.

== Overview ==
The neighborhoods most impacted were the Hill District, North Side, and Homewood. More than one hundred businesses were either vandalized or looted with arsonists setting 505 fires.

One person was killed and thirty-six were injured.

== Aftermath ==
After six days, order was finally restored on April 11, with property damage surpassing $600,000 (equivalent to $5.56 million in 2025). One thousand arrests were made by law enforcement. Many of the neighborhoods impacted never fully recovered in the following decades.

== See also ==
- List of incidents of civil unrest in the United States

=== Other Civil Rights-Era riots in Pennsylvania ===
- 1964 Philadelphia Riot
- 1969 York Riot
