= 1968 New York City riot =

Disturbance after the assassination of Martin Luther King Jr.

- Part of King assassination riots
- Date: April 4–5, 1968
- Location: New York City, New York
- Caused by: Assassination of Martin Luther King

Parties
Rioters	New York Police Department

The 1968 New York City riot was a disturbance sparked by the assassination of Martin Luther King on April 4, 1968. Harlem, the largest African-American neighborhood in Manhattan was expected to erupt into looting and violence as it had done a year earlier, in which two dozen stores were either burglarized or burned and four people were killed. However, Mayor John Lindsay traveled into the heart of the area and stated that he regretted King's wrongful death which led to the calming of residents. Numerous businesses were still looted and set afire in Harlem and Brooklyn, although these events were not widespread and paled in comparison to the riots in Washington D.C., Baltimore, and Chicago in which federal troops were needed to quell the disorders.

== Other instances of unrest ==
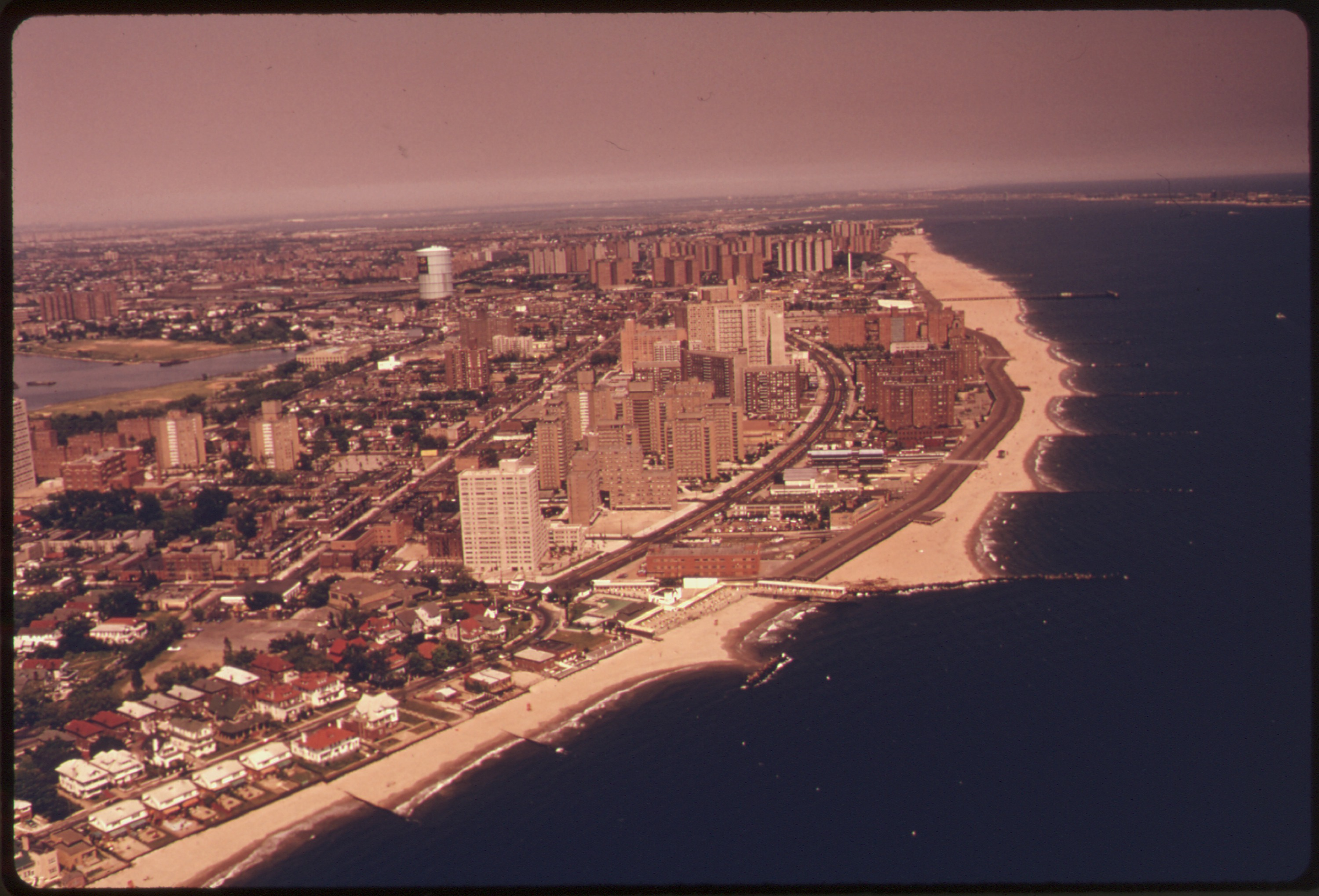
Coney Island as seen in a 1974 photograph taken by Hope Alexander as part of the DOCUMERICA program.

Two unrelated instances of civil unrest would happen in the city during July on the Lower East Side and Coney Island at close to the same time. It is unknown if they both had a connection.

An episode of civil unrest would occur in Coney Island starting on July 19, with African-American and Puerto Rican blocks would explode into rioting. What had caused this is unknown. The Tactical Patrol Force (TPF) would be deployed on July 22 to combat the crowd which worked. Mayor Lindsay would tour the area in Coney Island where the riot happened at on July 23 and hold meetings with the locals there. In meetings held with city officials and community members, a promise would be made that the TPF would not harass those who were working as part of anti-poverty programs or "attack the 'community action centers of the people inside them.'"

The riot on the Lower East Side would begin at 9 PM on July 23 after the police attempted to break up a fight between Puerto Ricans and Eastern Europeans at 9th Street and Avenue C but the crowd retaliated and the police were attacked. During that night, four police cars would end up getting destroyed and 13 arrests were made. The next night on July 24, 400 police officers would be deployed and 600 people would show up with the crowds being angry at the conduct of the police. The police would receive gunfire and have bottles thrown at them. Police officers and firefighters would be wounded that night. It would last until July 27 when a police force was withdrawn from the area. Also during July 27, a peace march would be held.

== See also ==
- 1967 New York City riot
- Death of Eric Garner
- List of incidents of civil unrest in New York City
- Occupy Wall Street
- List of incidents of civil unrest in the United States
