= Dixmoor race riot =

1964 race riot in Dixmoor, Illinois

- Part of Ghetto riots
- Location: Dixmoor, Illinois

Parties
Illinois State Police	rioters

Casualties
- Injuries: 37
- Arrested: 25

The 1964 Dixmoor race riot, also known as the Gin Bottle Riot, occurred between August 15 and 17 in Dixmoor, Illinois. After a woman accused of shoplifting a bottle of gin was wrestled to the ground by the owner of the liquor store and arrested, black residents took to the streets in anger. They picketed the liquor store, but then attacked it, looting it and burning various nearby buildings.

== Cause of the riot ==
On August 15, 1964, Blondella Woods, a black woman and Chicago resident, was accused of stealing a bottle of gin from Foremost Liquors at 2240 West 147th Street in Dixmoor. When she tried to leave the store, owner Michael "Big Mike" LaPota and his employees wrestled Woods to the floor, reportedly to prevent her from fleeing or smashing liquor bottles. African-American witnesses recounted that LaPota and his employees beat Woods before she was arrested; she was taken to a hospital by police.

The next day at 11 a.m. on August 16, demonstrators picketed Foremost Liquors, protesting LaPota and his assault of Woods. They carried signs that read, "Big Mike Must Go," "Mike Beats Negro Women," and "Dixmoor Police are Afraid of Big Mike." This protest escalated into violence and a riot.

== The riot ==
Rioters attacked LaPota's liquor store first. After police arrived with firefighters with high-pressure hoses to protect the stores, the rioters began to attack passing motorists. They threw rocks, bottles, stones, and bricks, breaking car windows and windshields, and hurting drivers and passengers. State police fired small arms overhead while advancing toward the rioters. A total of 225 police officers from local, county, and state departments were called to the scene. Sheriff Richard B. Ogilvie, future Governor of Illinois, instructed police to broadcast over loudspeakers: "If you shoot, we’re going to fire back." According to Ogilvie, the riot began around 8 p.m. on August 16 and was over by 2 a.m. August 17 An estimated 1000 people were involved in the protest and riot. 37 people were injured, and 25 people were arrested and booked at the Harvey, Illinois police station.

== See also ==
- List of incidents of civil unrest in the United States
