= 1959 United Mine Workers strike =

1959 labor strike in Kentucky

The 1959 United Mine Workers strike was a labor action by union miners in Eastern Kentucky. Originally over a pay increase, it grew into a conflict between union and non-union mines that resulted in three deaths. It was the first instance of labor violence in the area since the Harlan County War and was the prelude to the Roving Picket Movement.

== Background ==
The economy of Eastern Kentucky in the 1950s was almost exclusively based on coal. After World War II, industries such as locomotives and home-heating turned away from coal to oil and diesel fuel. Large coal companies had to protect their interests, so the Bituminous Coal Operators' Association was founded in 1950 to bargain with the United Mine Workers of America. In 1952, a contract was negotiated between the two organizations raising wages for workers by $1.90. Another contract in 1955 increased wages another $2.00 per shift. Smaller mines found it harder to compete with the larger mines cooperating with the union.

The 126 larger rail mines exported their coal by train and collectively hired over 12,000 workers. The smaller mines hired independent truckers to haul their coal by road. While they only employed 5-20 miners each, they far outnumbered the rail mines at 2,500. These mines could only operate at a profit by paying their workers far below the daily union wage of $22.25 per day, sometimes as low as $4.

In 1958, a new contract was being written that would implement an additional $2 pay increase to raise the daily wage to $24.25. This contract also included the Protective Wage Clause, requiring ramps to certify that they only buy coal from mines paying this union wage. This was problematic for the truck mines that could only profit from low labor costs. If they unionized and paid the full wage, they would lose money and go out of business. If they continued to underpay their miners, they would be locked out of the market and go out of business. This issue extended to the workers in the truck mines, who did not want to be a part of the already prevalent unemployment problem in the region. In Harlan, 4,000 miners were without work before the strike began. The large rail mines, owned by U.S. Steel, Bethlehem Steel, Consolidation Coal, Hannah Coal, and the Southeast Coal Co. signed the new contract without trouble. Most of the truck mines did not.

== The Strike ==
The strike began on March 9, 1959, in Harlan and spread to Perry, Letcher, Pike, Knox, Bell, and Knot counties over the next week. It was hailed as a "U.M.W. Revival," alluding to past union activity in the area during the Harlan County War. The events of the 30s loomed heavily over the start of the strike as people worried if it would become as violent. Many pickets were even "veterans of the coal field battles of the 1930s that helped build a powerful UMW." While strike activity began peacefully, concerns grew as strikers increased. By March 16, there were 1,000 miners participating. They gathered at 5 in the morning and hovered at the coal ramps for a few hours before driving to tour non-union mines. They were specifically targeting the hundreds of small truck mines that did not sign the contract. They held firm that the strike would last until all the mines had signed; the strike slogan became "no contract—no work."

One miner maintained that they would "stay out as long as the union buys my groceries", (The Nation). Strikers affiliated with the United Mine Workers were often fiercely loyal to their union. At the time, miners were provided two weeks of vacation, vacation pay, unemployment compensation, access to the union's hospitals, among other benefits. For the strike, the U.M.W. provided food vouchers and gas to the workers, so they could canvas non-union mines by car. However, this would still be difficult as there were hundreds of truck mines in the area. According to the State Department of Mines and Minerals, there were 724 truck mines compared to just 15 rail mines.

It was not long before some demonstrations became violent. One clash resulted in a broken neck and several other injuries and had to be broken up by the State Police. Truck mine operators used this to their advantage and petitioned Kentucky Governor Albert Chandler and later President Eisenhower to deploy troops "to restore law and order". They held that "citizens...live in mortal fear of their lives." While their request had not yet been answered, they still had no plans to sign the contract. Truck mine operators didn't believe the contract to be about wages, but rather an effort to "wipe out the small truck-mine industry". A local union representative fired back, saying that miners weren't "striking for a $2 wage, but for a $20 wage over the $4 a day they're now getting," referring to the low pay of truck mines.

Eventually, the governor threatened to deploy troops if there was any more violence or if there were over a hundred pickets at a single mine. State Police continued to be the main force holding off strikers. Amidst clashes and futile discussions, truck mine operators and drivers began to arm themselves. A machine gun was "set up, menacingly, at one non-union mine". They threatened to "shoot first, then ask questions", (Business Week 4/25). As attacks on union members increased, union miners threatened to arm in reaction if they would not be protected by police. On the night of April 11, several pickets were fired upon and a local U.M.W. president's home was shot into, though no one was injured. Most picketing however, remained peaceful except for some minor clashes. On incident resulted in the arrest of two female pickets. The scuffle involved another woman who was seven-months pregnant.

Truck mine operators also began to organize in April. The Perry County Independent Coal Operators Association was founded for the "promotion and well being of the truck mining industry in Perry County and Eastern Kentucky." The organization stressed their willingness to negotiate with the United Mine Workers, saying that they did not have a say in the new contract. They continued to stress the importance of the truck mining industry on the economy of Eastern Kentucky, saying that it runs on "truck wheels". An agreement was made, placing a limit on the number of pickets, discouraging union motorcades, and warning against trespassing and blocking roadways. The pact also warned against the use of firearms. A violation of the agreement would result in the deployment of the National Guard.

Despite this threat of troop deployment, violence continued. Shooting was common and a four-rail tipple with coal cars was destroyed by an explosion. Other dynamite attacks on property also became ordinary. One independent truck driver was killed by three union men after he stepped out of his vehicle. Not long after, the U.M.W. pulled out of the peace agreement, citing operators intimidating miners. Despite the chaos, the union made progress. According to them, "Every truck operator in Johnson and Floyd and the majority in Pike County have signed the new contract."

In a new meeting in Frankfort, the U.M.W. reasserted their refusal to participate in the peace agreement, and the National Guard was deployed as a result. Four battalions moved into Perry and Letcher counties, around 2,000 troops. In the Harlan County War of the 1930s, the National Guard was used to break the picket lines and end the strike, but Maj. General J. J. B. Williams was aware of their past involvement. He is quoted as saying, "In past years, the Guard has been used to guard mine and possibly served in this role as strike breakers, but it's not going to be that way now as long as I have anything to do with it." Despite the presence of the troops and continuing violence, martial law was never declared. $200,000 of damage was caused when a coal tipple was burned by arsonists. The same tipple was dynamited twice before and would not be going back into service. Its manager estimated a one-million-dollar loss from the local economy.

The National Labor Relations Board sought a restraining order against the U.M.W. which was eventually issued by Federal Judge H. Church Ford. It was continued indefinitely in early May, preventing any strike activity by the U.M.W. This was the end of mass picketing and most of the strike action, though violence continued for several months. Shortly after the order, the National Guard left the area.

The rest of May saw isolated instances of gunfire and use of dynamite, but no serious injuries. On June 5, a state trooper shot and killed a union miner. He was trying to arrest the miner for shooting at a non-union trucker. This marked the second death of the dispute and the first and only union death. Another non-union miner was shot by snipers but survived. In this stage of the strike, sniper attacks were common. Oftentimes they targeted trucks at loading spots. Dynamite explosions also remained common, targeting railroad infrastructure. On July 12, six men were arrested after a several hour manhunt for dynamiting Chavies Mining Firm. By the end of July, the United Mine Workers claimed that 58 truck mine and ramp operators have signed the contract, affecting 1,000 miners, but operators denied the increase in signing. Thus far, three people were shot to death and more than $700,000 of property was destroyed.

== Food Voucher Dispute ==
In October it was reported that coal production was down 19.3% for the year from the number of miners off work. For food, miners were dependent on the union. They originally distributed food vouchers worth between twenty and thirty dollars. These were then cut to $20, then $10, and finally discontinued completely just before Thanksgiving as the union ran out of funds to support the strikers. In December, several union miners began picketing outside their local union office to have the vouchers restored. They accused the union of lying when the strike began in March. One said, "We've been living on dried eggs, powdered milk, and a little meal since they cut out our vouchers." Yet, they maintained that they were "100 percent union men. We just don't see eye to eye with the leaders in the union." The union had no comment on the vouchers. By Christmas 1959, the strikers gave up the effort after the union threatened to pull their hospital cards as well.

== Aftermath ==
Beyond the loss of food vouchers, in August 1960 the union revoked access to the hospitals for miners that had been unemployed for over a year, or even if they were working in a non-union mine. In 1962, the U.M.W. closed all its hospitals in the region, leaving the miners without medical care. The lack of funds came from corruption in the union, and the resulting agitation among the miners created the Roving Picket Movement.

In April 1960, it was reported by the Kentucky Department of Economic Security that over 7,000 jobs were lost since before the strike, and that job recovery had not taken place. In January 1959, employment in the coal industry was at 29,300 workers. In March, it dropped to 21,500, before reaching the low point in July at 19,900. The average for the year was 22,500 workers. The rampant job loss resulted in new non-union truck mines that some union miners found themselves working at. The strike was described as U.M.W. President John L. Lewis's "last ditch effort to organize Eastern Kentucky." He would resign as president in December 1959.
