= Lists of incidents of civil unrest in the United States =

The following are lists which pertain to incidents of civil unrest and political violence in the United States, sorted alphabetically by city.

- Atlanta, Georgia - List of incidents of civil unrest in Atlanta
- Baltimore, Maryland - List of incidents of civil unrest in Baltimore
- Cincinnati, Ohio - Cincinnati riots
- Chicago, Illinois - List of incidents of civil unrest in Chicago
- Detroit, Michigan - List of riots in Detroit
- Eugene, Oregon - List of incidents of civil unrest in Eugene
- Omaha, Nebraska - List of riots and civil unrest in Omaha, Nebraska
- Minneapolis–Saint Paul - List of incidents of civil unrest in Minneapolis–Saint Paul
- New York City, New York - List of incidents of civil unrest in New York City
- Washington, D.C. - List of incidents of political violence in Washington, D.C.

== See also ==
- List of incidents of civil unrest in the United States
- List of riots (notable incidents of civil disorder worldwide)
