= Camden Riot of 1971 =

1971 public disorder in New Jersey, US

The Camden Riot of 1971 was a public disorder in Camden, New Jersey, that occurred following the death of a Puerto Rican motorist at the hands of white police officers. When the officers were not charged, Hispanic residents took to the streets and called for the suspension of those involved. The officers were ultimately charged, but remained on the job and tensions soon flared. On August 20, riots erupted and fifteen major fires were set before order was restored. Ninety people were injured and city officials ended up suspending the officers, who were later acquitted by a jury.

The day following the riot, Mayor Joseph M. Nardi Jr. declared a state of emergency and imposed a curfew from 8 p.m. to 7 a.m.

== See also ==
- List of incidents of civil unrest in the United States
