= 1968 Tallahassee riots =

Riot in Florida

- Part of King assassination riots
- Date: April 4–7, 1968
- Location: Tallahassee, Florida
- Caused by: Assassination of Martin Luther King Jr.

Parties
| Protestors, rioters | Tallahassee Police Department |

Lead figures
| | Gene Berkowitz |

Casualties
- Deaths: 1
- Injuries: 14

The 1968 Tallahassee riots were one of many riots that broke out after Martin Luther King Jr. was assassinated in Tallahassee, Florida lasting from April 5–7, 1968. It was originally a student protest but later escalated into a riot. The riot happened at Florida A & M University but unrest would be seen to a lesser extent in the Frenchtown neighborhood.

== Background ==
=== City overview ===
Tallahassee was described as having a population of about 68,000 with 25% of the population being African-American in 1968. It was also Florida's state capital.

There were two state universities in the city: Florida State University (FSU) and the Florida Agricultural and Mechanical University (FAMU). FAMU was a historically black university while FSU was an all white university until 1962. The hospital at FAMU's campus started to lose federal funding in 1965 because the university's hospital was not admitting white patients despite most of the staff being white. Tallahassee Memorial Hospital eventually started to admit black patients to try and not lose federal funding which led to drawing away middle-class African American patients who could pay and had the right insurance coverage to choose TMH over FAMU's hospital. The hospital began to fall into bad financial grounds as it could not attract patients who were either white or African American. In 1967 the county and municipal government took over control of the hospital. The hospital itself became a point of contention for students, alumni and faculty at FAMU who felt that the university's President William Gore Jr. did not fight hard enough in their eyes to protect the hospital. Also in 1967, there were talks of merging the university with FSU. By February 1968 students had created several black power groups and created a student newspaper named UHURU as they felt the university needed to be protected.

=== Civil Rights Movement ===
Tallahassee saw action during the Civil Rights Movement. The 1956 Tallahassee bus boycott was eventually successful in desegregating the bus system in the city. What caused the boycott was when 2 African-American students from FAMU, Wilhelmina Jakes and Carrier Patterson sat in the whites only section where there was the only 2 vacant seats left and were asked to either move to back of the bus and stand in the back or leave the bus without getting their fares back. Starting on May 28 the boycott ran until December 22.

A chapter of the Congress of Racial Equality was created at FAMU after two students from there went to the University of Miami during the summer of 1959 and entered a chapter at a CORE workshop at the University of Miami and ended up bringing it back to FAMU. After the CORE chapter was created, a series of events like picketing and sit-ins were done by them with mixed results. The events did not receive that much publicity and there is little known about them.

==== Sit-ins ====
There was a series of sit-ins protests in the city between 1960 and 1961. The sit-ins began on February 13, 1960, when a combination of 8 high school and FAMU students held a sit-in at a local Woolworth store's counter for 2.5 hours that day. No arrests were reported in the sit-in that day. Another sit-in was held on February 20. This time 11 students participated and a police squad led by the mayor asked them to leave. The protesters refused and were arrested. Reverend Daniel B. Speed bailed the students out and the protestors were arrested under the charge of disturbing the peace by riotous conduct along with unlawful assembly. They were all found guilty in court and were offered the option of paying a $300 fine or doing 60 service days. All but three of the students chose service.

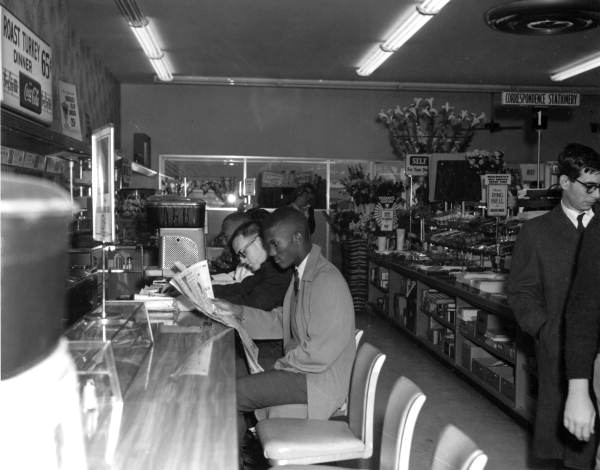
A sit-in protest at a Woolworth's counter on March 13, 1960

The sit-in protests would continue to grow in size and the resistance they faced as well. During March 5 and 12 protests, students who were white from FSU joined in with the black students from FAMU. 240 students were arrested in the two protests. During March 12 a thousand students from FAMU going in groups of 75 each went to the downtown area with posters and wanted the students who were arrested to be released. A "Local Citizen Council" prevented them from entering a store as a group of white men who were armed in one instance. Students gathered in response to the large amount of arrests. The mayor announced that the group had three minutes to disperse but before the time was up, the police used tear gas with several females being hospitalized after receiving burns. State government officials thought that the protests would weaken the Florida Interracial Committee and that they would end making the Democratic gubernatorial primaries more favorable for a segregationist candidate, Farris Bryant. The sit-ins themselves were not effective in accomplishing their goals.

== Riots ==
Students at the FAMU first reacted to the assassination of Martin Luther King Jr. with sadness later followed by anger. Student protests became violent within a few hours with bottles and rocks being thrown at cars that were driving by along with gunfire. A white youth got a bleeding ear after his car was attacked and was the first person to be injured. The Southern Mobile Homes Brokers located at 1804 South Monroe Street was firebombed at 9 PM and 2 trailers were burned down. The police finished the process of cordoning off all of FAMU's campus in four different directions. At around that same time one of the city commissioners, John A. Rudd was injured by shattered glass when the car he was in with Mayor Gene Berkowitz was hit by bricks and bottles on Railroad Avenue close to Gamble Street. At 10 PM a group of blacks went into a different entrance to the university. The police were fired upon by rioters. As a result, police forces hid behind their patrol cars and the paddy wagon that was at the scene.

During April 15, violence continued. At 2:30 AM 19-year-old Travis E. Crow III who was an upstairs resident of Crow's Grocery located at 1902 Lake Bradford Road died from asphyxiation after it was firebombed. In the Frenchtown neighborhood that day, two furniture stores, Home Furniture Store located at 622 North Macomb Street and Waldo's Furniture Company located at 624 West Fourth Avenue, would be firebombed. At the Home Furniture Store, there was an automatic sprinkler system which extinguished the fire. Closer to the FAMU campus, Econowash Launderette at 316 West Pershing Street was broken into and destroyed.

As a result of the rioting, the president of FAMU closed down the university on April 6 and it remained closed until April 15 as the Board of Regent chancellor, Robert B. Mautz ordered him to do so. Dormitories were evacuated at 7 PM on April 5 at FAMU as well. Sporting goods and ammunition stores exercised more caution or refused to sell ammunition at all.

== Aftermath ==
Chancellor Mautz said that university authorities along with the local police would punish those who led the riots. A student at FAMU, Thomas Watts was arrested in May 1968 for possessing a firebomb and inciting a riot. 12 arrest warrants were issued for suspects who had connections to the riot, all being black. A $2,700 reward was posted for any information that would lead to the arrest and conviction of the person who had thrown the firebomb that killed Crow. Sheriff Joyce said on April 9 that there was not much evidence surrounding the case. On May 5, two black teenagers were arrested and charged for Crow's death: 17-year-old James Colbert and 18-year-old Billy Ray Oliver. The county judge ruled that Crow's death was homicide by arson and the two were convicted of first degree murder and got life sentences. The Florida cabinet authorized a $100,000 purchase of mace, tear gas, helmets and shotguns among other equipment for the state police in response to the riots. The security force at FAMU was increased from 11 to 18.

A memorial service and march was organized by Reverend Raleigh Gooden on April 9 for Crow and the march continued for 15 blocks.
