= 2014 Oakland riots =

Civil unrest in California, United States

2014 Oakland Riots
- Part of the shooting of Michael Brown
- Date: November 24-December 10, 2014 (2 weeks, 3 days)
- Location: Oakland, California, parts of Berkeley, California, parts of San Francisco, California
- Caused by: Grand Jury decision not to charge Darren Wilson in death of Michael Brown, Grand Jury Decision in New York not to charge officer in death of Eric Garner
- Methods: Protests, Widespread Rioting, Vandalism, Arson, Looting, Black Bloc

Parties
California; Oakland, California; Oakland Police Department; City of Berkeley; Berkeley Police Department; California Highway Patrol; San Francisco; San Francisco Police Department	Black Lives Matter; Local protesters; Anarchists

Casualties
- Injuries: 5+
- Arrested: 350+

The 2014 Oakland riots were a series of riots and civil disturbances that took place in Oakland, California and surrounding areas in November and December 2014. On November 24, 2014, following the decision of a Grand Jury in St. Louis to not charge Darren Wilson in the shooting death of black teenager Michael Brown, protests and rioting broke out in Oakland and later spread to other Bay Area cities. For more than two weeks, the Bay Area was the site of civil unrest as protesters clashed with police and damaged public and private property.

== Timeline of riots ==
- November 24: In Ferguson, Missouri, a Grand Jury decided not to charge officer Darren Wilson in the fatal shooting of Michael Brown, an unarmed young African-American man. The decision sparked outrage in Ferguson, and rioting rocked the city throughout the night as stores were looted, and cars and buildings were set on fire. In Oakland, hundreds of protesters gathered in downtown to march for Michael Brown. The protesters eventually blocked Interstate 580. The crowd marched back downtown, and as the night wore on became violent. Several stores, and a police car were vandalized, and burning barricades were erected on city streets. Later that night, some stores were looted including a Smart and Finals grocery store.
- November 25: Protesters returned to the streets of Oakland the following night, blocking various roads, looting businesses and setting up burning barricades again. 92 individuals were arrested that night.
- November 28: Protesters numbering over 1000 gathered in Union Square in San Francisco on Black Friday to continue protesting the Ferguson decision. While originally peaceful, the protests turned ugly as demonstrators hurled objects at police, smashed windows, and attempted to set a news van on fire in downtown. more than 50 people were arrested and two officers suffered injuries from flying objects. Due to violence, BART shut down transportation between the 16th street and 24th street stations, and protests continued until around 10:00 PM.
- December 3: A Grand Jury in New York declined to indict officers in the death of Eric Garner. In San Francisco, demonstrators closed off streets in downtown. In nearby Oakland, a peaceful march was held against the New York decision.
- December 6: Protests continued in Oakland, now reignited by the decision in the Eric Garner case. A march in Berkeley turned violent as masked protesters clashed with police and shattered windows. Police issued numerous warnings to disperse before using tear gas and rubber bullets on the demonstrators, and clashes continued until 3 a.m.
- December 7: Protesters gathered in Berkeley again, and marched toward North Oakland, and were confronted by police in riot gear. Tear gas and rubber bullets were once again used and the protesters returned to downtown Berkeley, which was the site of rioting, vandalism, and looting. Numerous buildings including Berkeley City Hall, a McDonald's, Citibank, and a Walgreens suffered damage to windows, and numerous fires were set in the street.
- December 8: Demonstrators blocked Interstate 80 in Berkeley for hours, eventually clashing with police, throwing rocks and bottles before being pushed out.
- December 9: Protesters marched again through Berkeley, and clashed with police in riot gear, while also setting fires and looting a Pak and Save Grocery store, CVS and 7-Eleven.
- December 10: Two undercover CHP officers were discovered in a protest in Oakland and assaulted, with the one officer sustaining a blow to the head. His partner was forced to pull his service pistol while the injured officer arrested his assailant.
- December 15: Peaceful protesters blockaded Oakland Police Department headquarters for more than four hours, representing the four hours Michael Brown lay dead in the street, but unlike previous protests there was no property destruction or clashes.

== Reactions ==
Reactions to the protests were mixed. Some in the public supported the protests while still condemning the violence. However, others were more angry over the destruction. Storeowner Edwin Cabrillo scuffled with protesters using a broom as he tried to protect his wine store from being vandalized. "I put my whole life into this shop," he said. "This is what makes Oakland worse.".

== See also ==
- List of incidents of civil unrest in the United States
