= Mamaroneck riot =

The Mamaroneck riot was an armed clash between Irish and Italian-American laborers at Grand Park, Mamaroneck, Westchester County, New York, on August 13, 1870, resulting in the deaths of several men. One of the early labor riots to occur in the state, it became widely known at the time for its violence, as several rioters were stabbed to death.

Relations between Irish and Italian-American laborers at Mamaroneck had generally been hostile, as would be seen elsewhere in the country during the late 19th century, as Irish laborers objected to management importing cheaper labor in the form of recently arrived Italian immigrants. This feeling of animosity would result in several minor altercations two weeks prior to the incident.

On the afternoon of August 5, an altercation occurred between two groups of Irish and Italian-American workers who had been employed in the renovation of Mamaroneck. A large segment of Irish workers, who had yet to be paid off by a Mr. Wilson, had become angered that Wilson had already begun paying the 150 Italian immigrants recently employed by him.

At around 5:00 pm, a large group of Irish workers (who had reportedly been drinking at a local bar for several hours before) had begun harassing arriving Italian workers, which eventually led to the serious stabbing of a young Irish worker, causing the two mobs to begin hurling stones and other debris at each other.

Although newspaper accounts claim the deaths of two Irish and two Italian workers, there were no officially reported fatalities. However, the incident set off a chain of violence that resulted in the stabbing of five or six workers.
