= 1967 New York City riot =

- Part of Long, hot summer of 1967
- Date: July 23–30, 1967
- Location: New York City, U.S.
- Caused by: A police officer killing a Puerto Rican man who was threatening him with a knife.; Racial inequality

Parties
Rioters	New York; NYPD; Tactical Patrol Force

Casualties
- Deaths: 4
- Injuries: 5 police officers injured 24 firefighters injured

The 1967 New York City riot was one of many riots that occurred during the long, hot summer of 1967. The riot began after an off-duty police officer, Patrolman Anthony Cinquemani, while trying to break up a fight, shot and killed a Puerto Rican man named Renaldo Rodriquez who had a knife and lunged toward him.

== Background ==
=== Puerto Rican migration and conditions ===
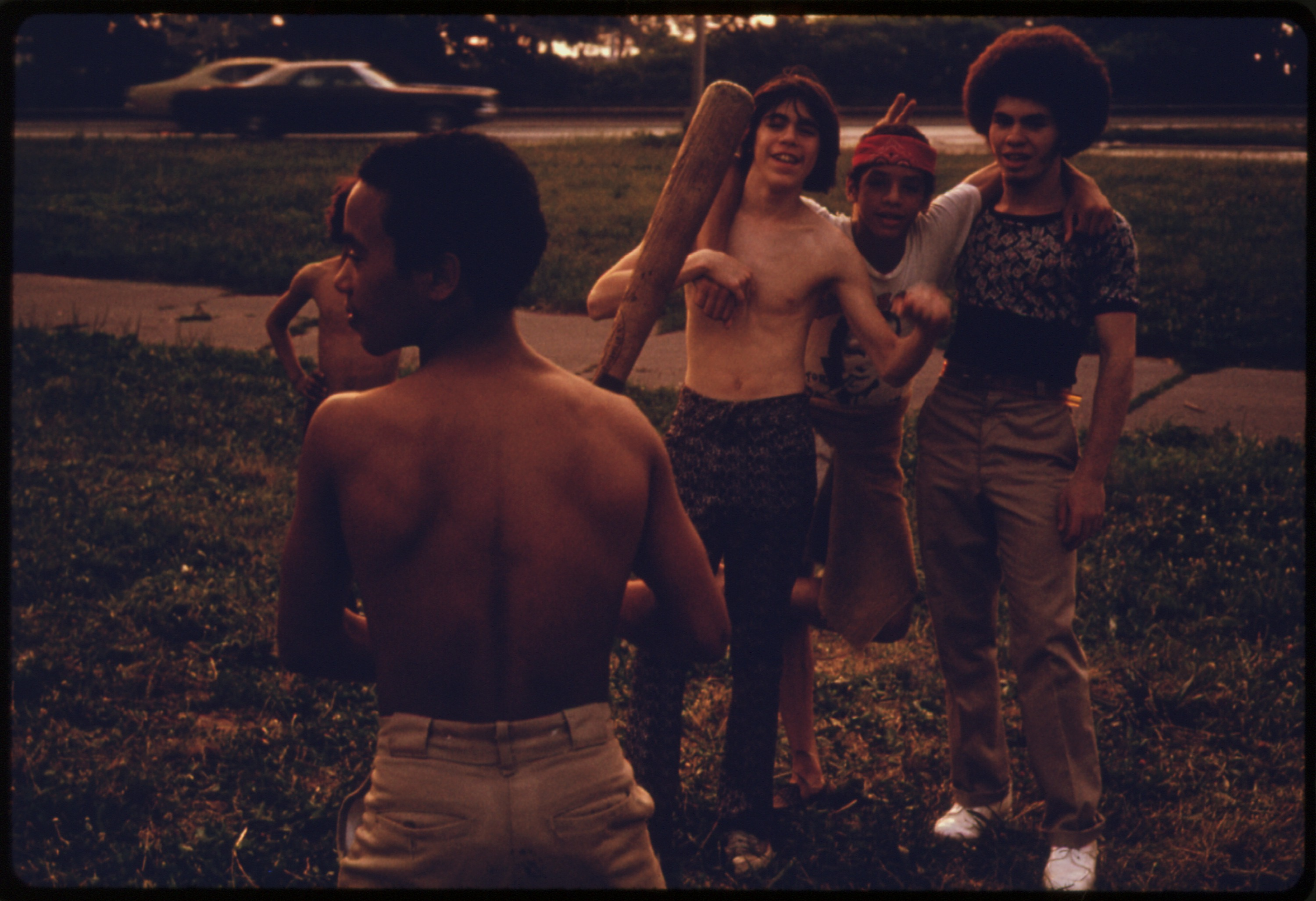
Puerto Rican boys playing softball in Brooklyn's Highland Park in 1974

Between 1943 and 1960 over 1/3 of Puerto Rico's population moved predominantly to the Northern United States cities of New York City, Philadelphia and Chicago. Puerto Ricans, along with their descendants born in the US, faced poverty and over-policing in the urban areas they often lived in. The descendants of original migrants were influenced by several factors such as the Civil Rights Movement, the Vietnam War, the urbanized environment and industrial decline along with increased levels of racial and economic segregation. With deindustrialization, many jobs were lost. 47% of Puerto Ricans were considered unemployed or underemployed by the Bureau of Labor Statistics.

By the time the 1960s had been reached, Manhattan had two sizable Puerto Rican communities, located in East Harlem and the Lower East Side.

During the 1960s and 1970s many cities with large amounts of Puerto Rican populations experienced riots. In Harlem, the police were used to experiencing conflicts with crowds. Usually crowd responses led to riots themselves.

=== Earlier incidents in Harlem ===
Tensions in the neighborhood involving Puerto Ricans increased after two incidents in the neighborhood. The first occurred when a police officer killed two Puerto Ricans, Victor Rodriguez and Maximo Solero, on November 15, 1963. The two were arrested on charges of disorderly conduct and the police stated that one of them pulled out a gun while under arrest in their car. The police said that this justified the usage of lethal force. The two officers were not charged in this incident. Skepticism was encountered with the story and protests happened afterwards and the Upper West Side's New York City Police Department was picketed. During January 1964, the police announced that they would intensify anti-bias programs relating to minorities and especially Puerto Ricans for their officers.

The second major incident in the area involving Puerto Ricans being killed by the police that led to raised tensions occurred on February 17, 1964. An off-duty police officer intervened in a fight outside a bar and ended up shooting and killing an 18-year-old Puerto Rican, Francisco Rodriguez Jr., who had fled from the scene after the police officer intervened. Sometime afterwards, a petition circulated. On February 23, the East 104th Street police station was picketed. The picketing was sponsored by the East Harlem Tenants Council, a rent strike group that was created five days earlier. The following day, a funeral march was held for Francisco at 9 AM, with five East Harlem Protestant churches giving out leaflets urging people to attend a day before the march was held. Gilberto Gerena-Valentin, a member of the steering committee of the National Association for Puerto Rican Civil Rights said that his association was considering a rent strike that would be citywide on February 29 as a way to call attention towards slum conditions along with rat and cockroach infestations.

== Inciting incident ==
Just after midnight on July 23, 1967, two plainclothes off-duty police officers, Thomas Ryan and Anthony Cinquemani, were cruising the Spanish Harlem neighborhood. They had both finished their shifts and were driving home. They encountered a brawl, where Renaldo Rodriguez was fighting another man with a knife; at the time these fights were common in the neighborhood and fatal shootings by police officers were common. The fight had occurred because he got into an argument with a man over a craps game. According to a police report on the incident, when Cinquemani and his partner arrived at the scene Rodriguez approached him with a knife. Cinquemani said he felt threatened and as a result drew his revolver and identified himself killing Rodriguez after repeatedly shooting him in the chest.

== Riots ==
=== July 23 ===
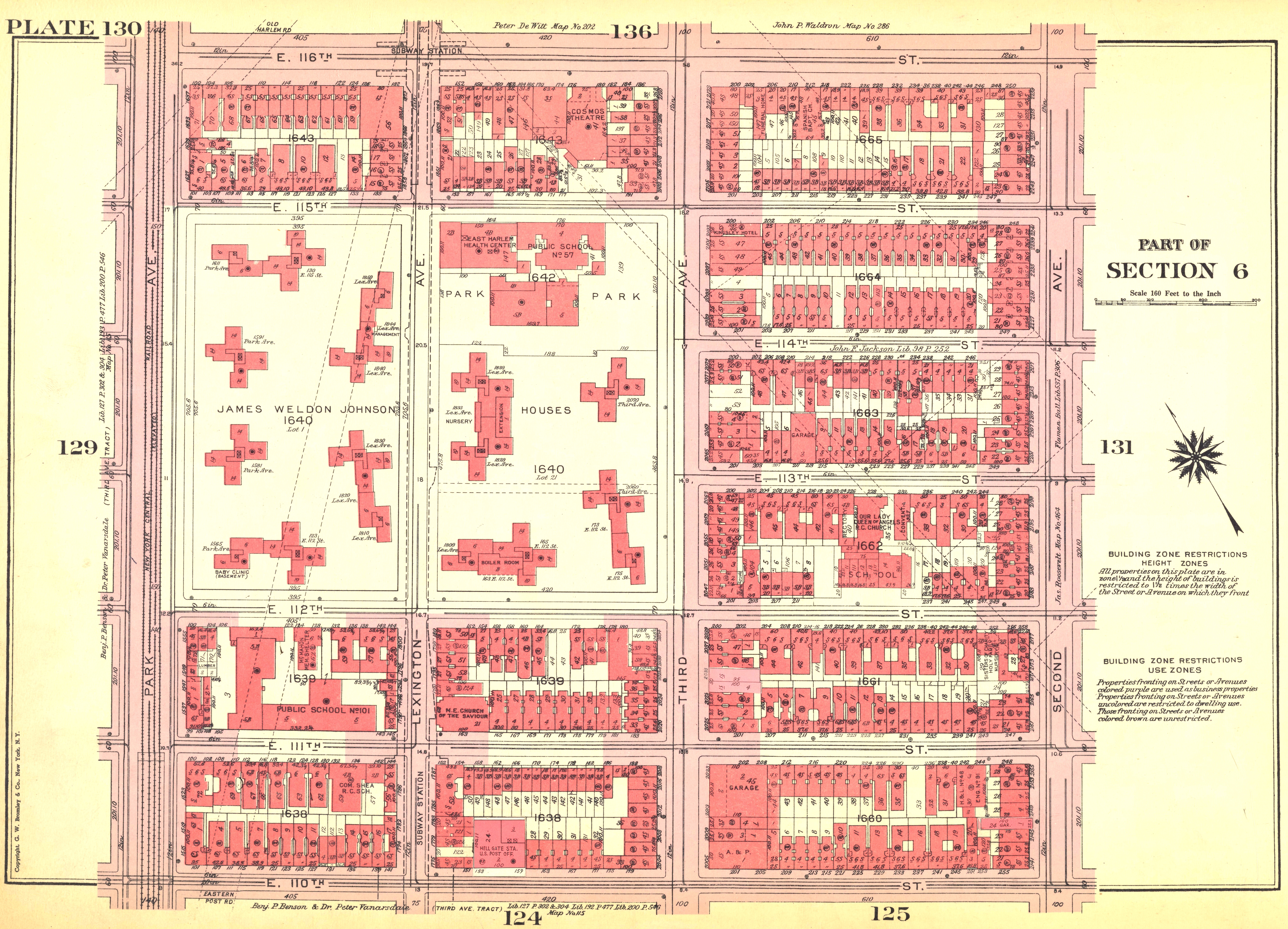
A map section from 1955 showing the area around 3rd Avenue and 111th Street

A crowd of about 400 Puerto Ricans and African Americans formed at Third Avenue and 111th Street where the shooting took place. Soon after the crowd formed, the New York Police Department sent the Tactical Patrol Force to where they had gathered. The Tactical Patrol Force was disliked by minorities in the city and when they arrived a clash started.

Mayor John Lindsay visited the area where the riots happened that day as he was legally mandated to by state law and attempted to cool down the violence by talking to the crowds that had gathered. During the times he visited the area he urged the local Puerto Rican community to create committees where they would meet at the mayor's residence, Gracie Mansion, to hear their issues. During the meetings later in the day, an agreement was reached that said local leaders would restore in the area if the Tactical Patrol Force was temporarily decommissioned. Also, during that day two people, Emma Haddock and Luis Antonio Torres were shot and killed by the police, which further angered residents. The police attempted to cover up their deaths.

=== Evening of July 23 and 24 ===
However, the victories made at the Gracie Mansion were short-lived as rioting resumed during the evening. At 10 PM a group of teenagers constructed a barricade that consisted of overflowing trash cans on Third Avenue and 111th Street and lit it on fire. The cops dispersed the crowd temporarily before it regathered again. This time, they marched on Third Avenue to the precinct house on 126th Street. Along the way they broke windows and looted stores. Police forces attempted to create barricades at major intersections on Third Avenue but let the crowd walk between 111th and 125th Streets. 250 police officers guarded the outside of the 126th Street precinct. When the crowd arrived, the police started hitting them with their batons and 1,000 officers responded to the situation. Fighting between the police and the crowd lasted throughout the night. The police themselves also broke windows, saying they only did so because rioters had damaged them. The police exchanged gunfire with snipers on top of the rooftops of 111th Street from 2-2:30 AM. 22-year-old Luis Torres, a drug dealer who was released on probation two weeks earlier, was killed during the night. The police said at first that he died after suffering a fall and breaking his neck. New York City's Medical Examiner, Milton Helpern, said that the cause of death was from a .38 caliber bullet shot in his ribs.

=== Evening of July 24 and 25 ===
Riots continued during the second night and spread into the South Bronx, after a false rumor that Mayor Lindsay would visit the area. Violence began after a crowd of 1,000 "attacked" a Gulf Oil gas station on 109th Street which they incorrectly thought was a shelter for the police. They were incited by a man giving speeches in Spanish nearby on Third Avenue and 111th Street about Puerto Ricans serving in the Vietnam War. The police tried to appease the crowds during that night on 109th and Third Avenue by not using sirens, helmets, and helicopters. At some point during the rioting that night, a group of youths drew a chalk line across Third Avenue at 110th Street in Manhattan and wrote that it was the "Puerto Rican border." Over 1,000 police officers were dispatched to deal with the 2,000 people who were involved in the unrest that night. The crowd dispersed after a heavy rainstorm happened at 3 AM.

A 19-year-old was shot in his arm along 139th Street in the Bronx. Youths set fire to trash cans in the Bronx and two stores were looted. The police assigned 70 officers to the area. During the unrest that night in the Bronx, the police shot and killed Jose Rodriguez, who was fighting 18-year-old Alfredo Feliciano over "a girl" at Longwood Avenue and Fox Street according to police. Police also stated that Feliciano stabbed Rodriguez in his stomach and that Rodriguez himself had a pistol. Feliciano was arrested in connection to the stabbing. The police said at first that he was killed after being stabbed on July 24. Rodriguez fired one shot at Patrolman Granville Watson. However, on July 25, the police changed their story, saying that Patrolman Watson fired a warning shot as the two had run off; and with his second shot he hit Rodriguez in his shoulder.

=== Evening of July 25 and 26 ===
Violence was described as being "sporadic" in East Harlem and the South Bronx during the evening. Heavy rainfall was intermittent and heavy from sunset to the early hours of the morning which reduced the risk of violence. Mayor Lindsay expressed concern about the possibilities of civil disturbances spreading to other Puerto Rican neighborhoods in the city and neighboring Central Harlem. The National Guard was placed on "an advisory alert" with Major General Almerin C. O'Hara deciding to put the commanders of National Guard companies throughout New York state on stand-by. By the fourth day, four Puerto Ricans had died during the riots.

=== July 26 and 27 ===
Although during the daytime hours of July 26 the city was described as being at a sense of peace. Also during July 26 the city's Police Commissioner, Howard R. Leary, ordered the entire patrol force to be on a six-day work week and give a 60% increase towards the number of officers available for anti-riot activities in an attempt to prevent any unrest in East Harlem from happening.

In addition to the unrest in Harlem and the Bronx, new violence hit other parts of the city as looting and vandalism erupted in Midtown during the night of July 26 and 27. At 11:30 PM on July 26, officers at a station on 51st Street reported that a crowd that was disorderly consisting of 100-150 youths leaving Central Park from a Rheingold Festival. The crowd went southwards along Broadway and turned eastwards toward 46th Street heading onto Fifth Avenue. Once at Fifth Avenue, they smashed the windows of a men's clothing store along the northeastern corner of Fifth Avenue and 46th Street. A shoe store on 38th Street was also looted that night. In response to this outbreak of violence, the police responded quickly. Officers were placed in pairs on the corner of Fifth and Madison Avenues running from 42nd to 50th Street. Commissioner Leary and Chief Inspector Sanford D. Garelick went to the scene from their command post located in East Harlem. At 1:30 AM Jacques Nevard, the deputy police commissioner who was the head of press relations, said that the unrest midtown was under control. By 2:20 AM the unrest was reported by the police as having ended with 32 arrests that night.

=== July 29 and 30 ===
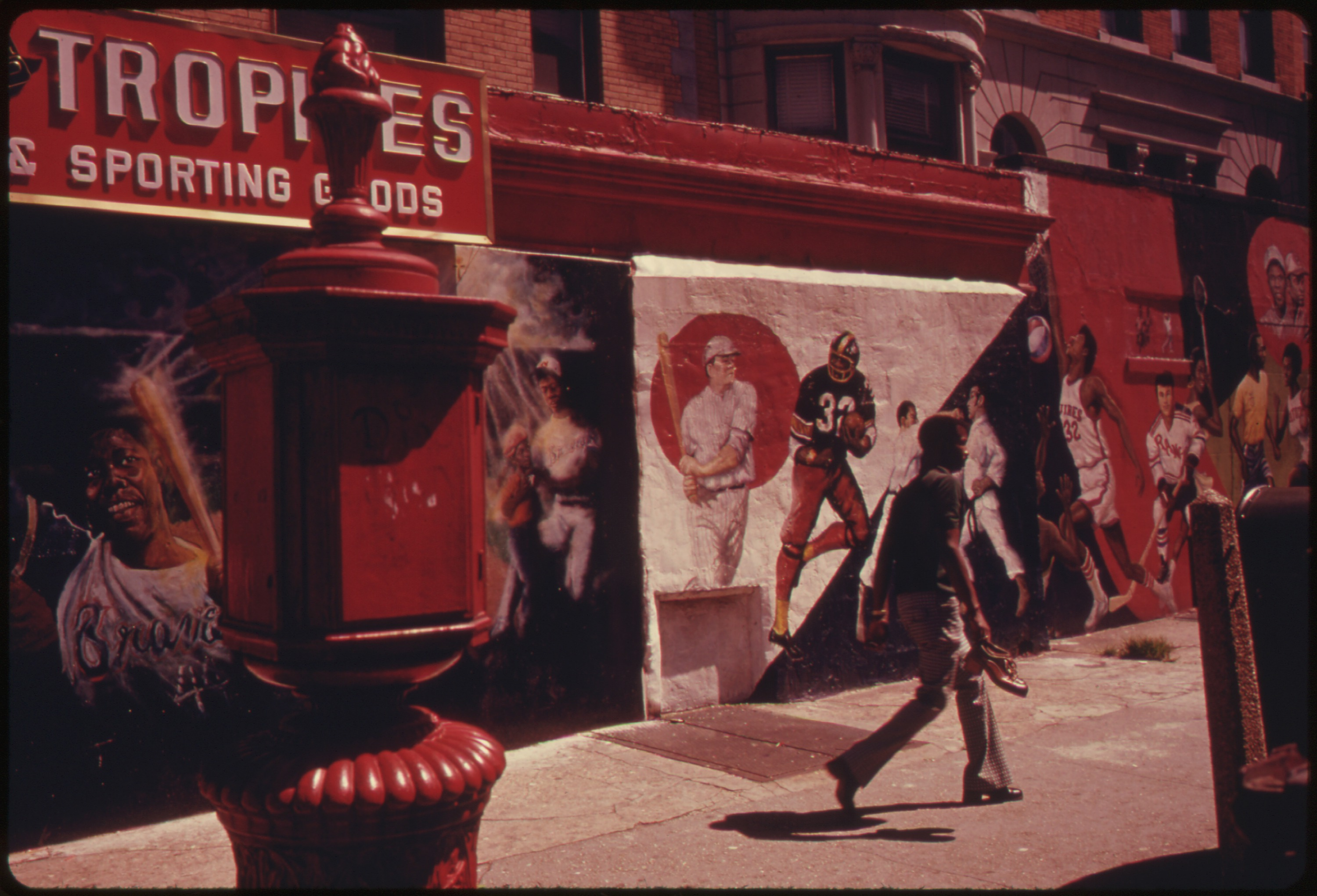
Murals on Nostrand Avenue as seen in a July 1974 photograph by Danny Lyon that was done as part of the Documerica program

Brooklyn's Bedford-Stuyvesant neighborhood saw unrest during July 29 and 30 as well. During the night of July 29, 100 police officers were sent into an area centering around Nostrand Avenue and Fulton Street. Windows were broken over the course of several hours before the crowd stopped and instead yelled insults at the police. The police did not retaliate and order returned by dawn that day. The Brooklyn disturbances resulted in 32 arrests in total over the course of two days. However, it is unknown what specifically caused it.

== Aftermath, legacy and results ==
Following the riots a consensus was formed from civic groups, the mayor, media, and parts of the police department that the riots themselves were not an explosion of lawlessness in the area, like how they were often viewed during the 1960s. Instead, the general image was that they were fueled by isolated incidents and their demands were created spontaneously.

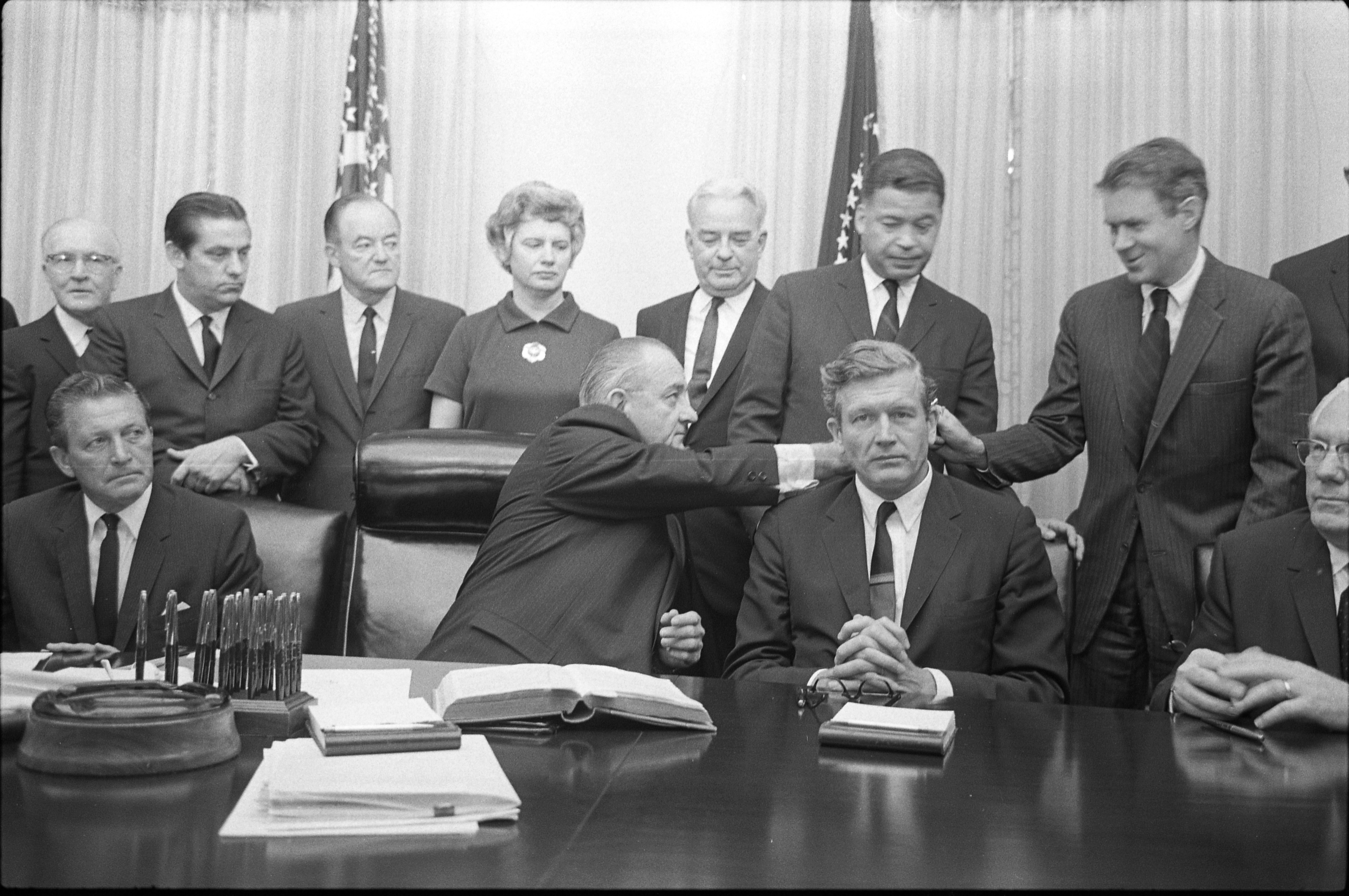
John Lindsay with Lyndon B. Johnson and other members of the Kerner Commission

Mayor Lindsay was asked by US President Lyndon B. Johnson to join the Kerner Commission on July 27, 1967. After being asked, Mayor Lindsay accepted the offer and served as the commission's vice chairman.

Another riot happened in the neighborhood of Brownsville in Brooklyn after an African-American police officer had killed a 14-year-old African American who was attempting to mug a Jewish man. A false rumor spread that it was a white police officer, which lead to inciting residents in the area with three consecutive nights of disturbances along Ralph Avenue from Bergen Street to Eastern Parkway.

What happened that year was one of many incidents of civil unrest during Mayor Lindsay's term as mayor. The following year in 1968, a brief period of unrest began after the assassination of Martin Luther King Jr. in April. The riots occurred close to the locations as in 1967. Also in 1968, two incidents of unrest not connected to the King assassination riot happened during July in Coney Island and the Lower East Side at close to the same time.

The Young Lords began having a presence in the city during 1969, establishing chapters in: East Harlem, Brooklyn, the Bronx and the Lower East Side. They had fast-paced campaigns and were also media-savvy. Some Puerto Ricans turned to the Young Lords as they felt more moderate forces like Mayor Lindsay could not solve their problems.

== See also ==
- Harlem riot of 1935
- Harlem riot of 1943
- Harlem riot of 1964
- 1968 New York City riot
