= USS Cumberland (IX-8) =

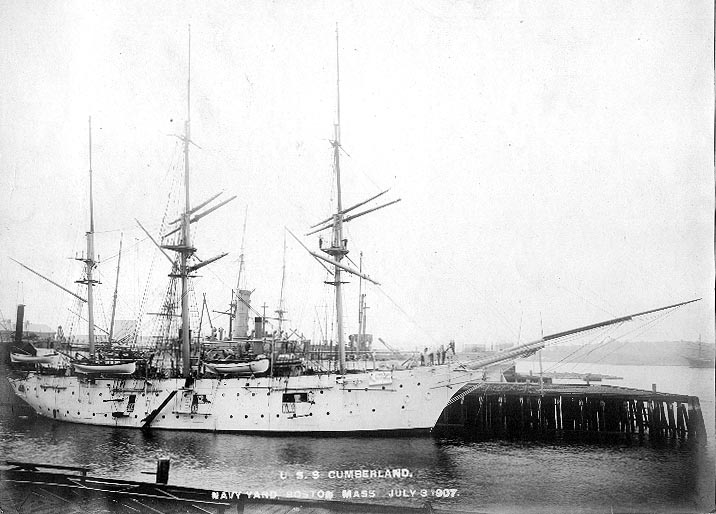

History

United States
- Launched: 17 August 1904
- Decommissioned: 31 October 1946
- Stricken: 22 July 1947
- Fate: Delivered to the War Shipping Administration for disposal

General characteristics
- Displacement: 1800 tons
- Length: 211 ft 7 in (64.49 m)
- Beam: 45 ft 8 in (13.92 m)
- Draught: 16 ft 5 in (5.00 m)
- Complement: 336 officers and men
- Armament: six four-inch guns

USS Cumberland (IX-8), an unclassified miscellaneous vessel, was the second ship of the United States Navy to be named for the Cumberland River.

A steel-hulled sailing bark, she was launched on 17 August 1904 by Boston Navy Yard sponsored by Miss P. Morton, daughter of the Secretary of the Navy, and commissioned on 20 July 1907 with Lieutenant Commander R. D. Hasbrouck of the Naval Training Station, Newport, Rhode Island, assigned to direct the training program on board the ship.

Towed from Boston, Massachusetts, to Naval Training Station Newport, she was commissioned as an auxiliary to Constellation, stationary training ship. About 200 apprentice seamen were immediately quartered on board her. She remained at Newport training landsmen and apprentice seamen until November 1912 when she was assigned to the Naval Station at Guantanamo Bay, Cuba, as station ship.

In 1914 Cumberland became receiving ship at the Naval Training Station, Norfolk, Virginia. On 7 April 1919 she was ordered to duty at Annapolis, Maryland, and was maintained at the United States Naval Academy until decommissioned on 31 October 1946 and delivered to the War Shipping Administration for disposal 22 July 1947.
