= Roving Picket Movement =

The Roving Picket Movement was the culmination of years of unrest from mine workers about their working conditions in Appalachia, a region of the United States. The movement lasted from 1959 to 1965, with goals of reinstating health benefits and improving working conditions. Miners protested at several mines in eastern Kentucky, and laid the foundation for future movements within the Appalachian coal community.

== Background ==
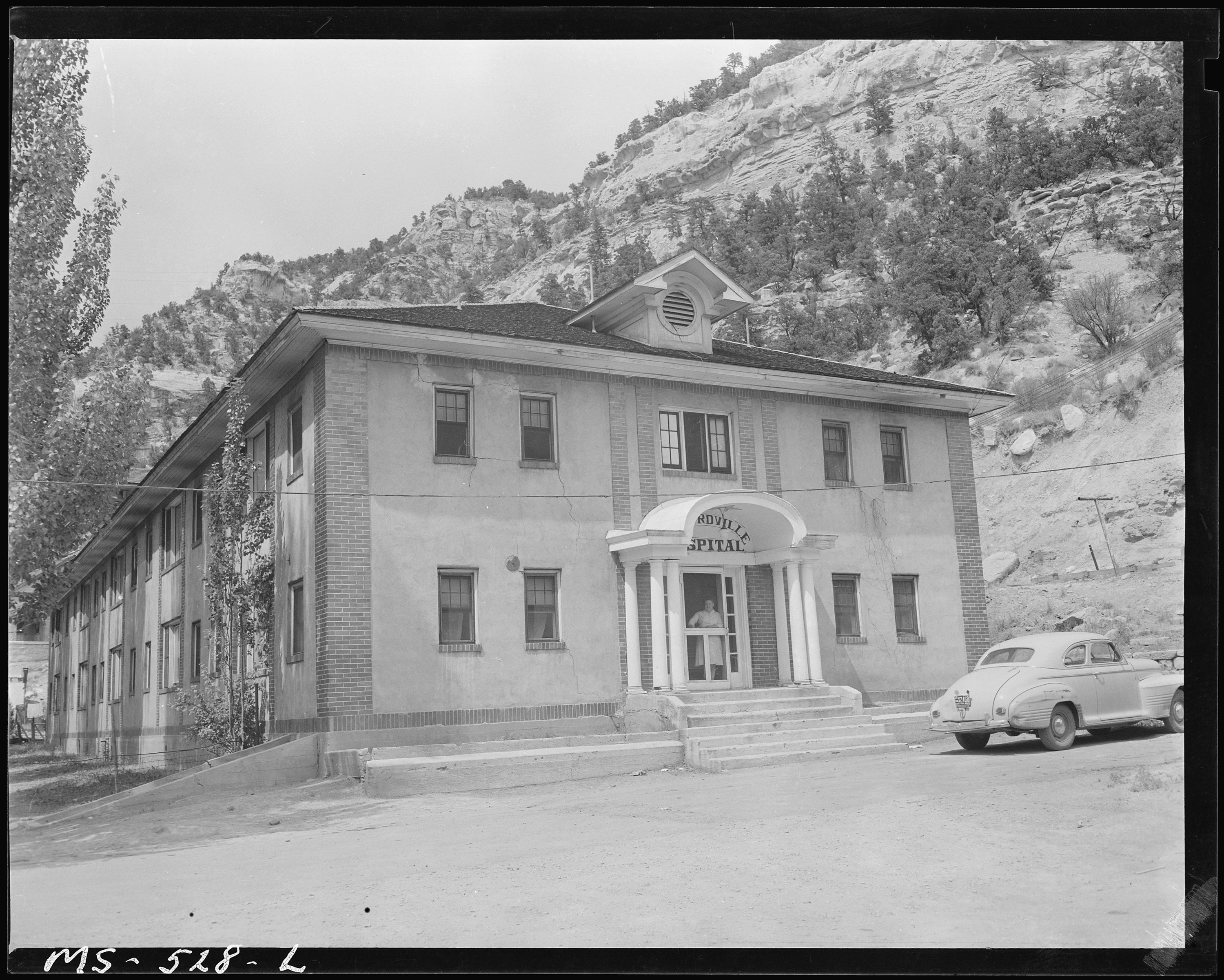
An example of the type of hospital that was closed by the United Mine Workers of America

During World War II, the United States of America provided a large portion of the Allied Powers' resources, which caused a huge spike in production that needed to be powered by coal. However, after WWII, this production was no longer necessary, which also decreased the need for coal. Because of this, the coal industry fell into a slump, dropping from 16.0 quadrillion BTU (of total energy use) to 12.0 quadrillion BTU from 1945 to 1949. To counter this loss, the United Mine Workers Association, or the UMWA, and the Bituminous Coal Operators Association, or the BCOA, negotiated an industry-wide deal that raised the wages of each miner from $1.90 per shift to $2.00 per shift in 1952. This wage could not be supported by smaller nor non-union coal mines, so many went bankrupt, which created a further increase in the power of the UMWA.

Many workers lost their jobs, which overall increased the wealth of the UMWA. An increase in mechanization also led to a decrease of miners. Miners were unhappy with this, because it would lead to higher job-loss, and in 1960, the UMWA Health and Retirement Funds chose to revoke medical coverage for miners who had been unemployed for over a year or who worked in a non-union mine. Two years later, in 1962, the UMWA Health and Retirement Funds closed all ten of its hospitals and took away the miners' medical cards. This kept the miners from being able to have access to proper medical care. This led to great unrest among coal miners and their families, leading to the Roving Pickets Movement.

== Activities ==
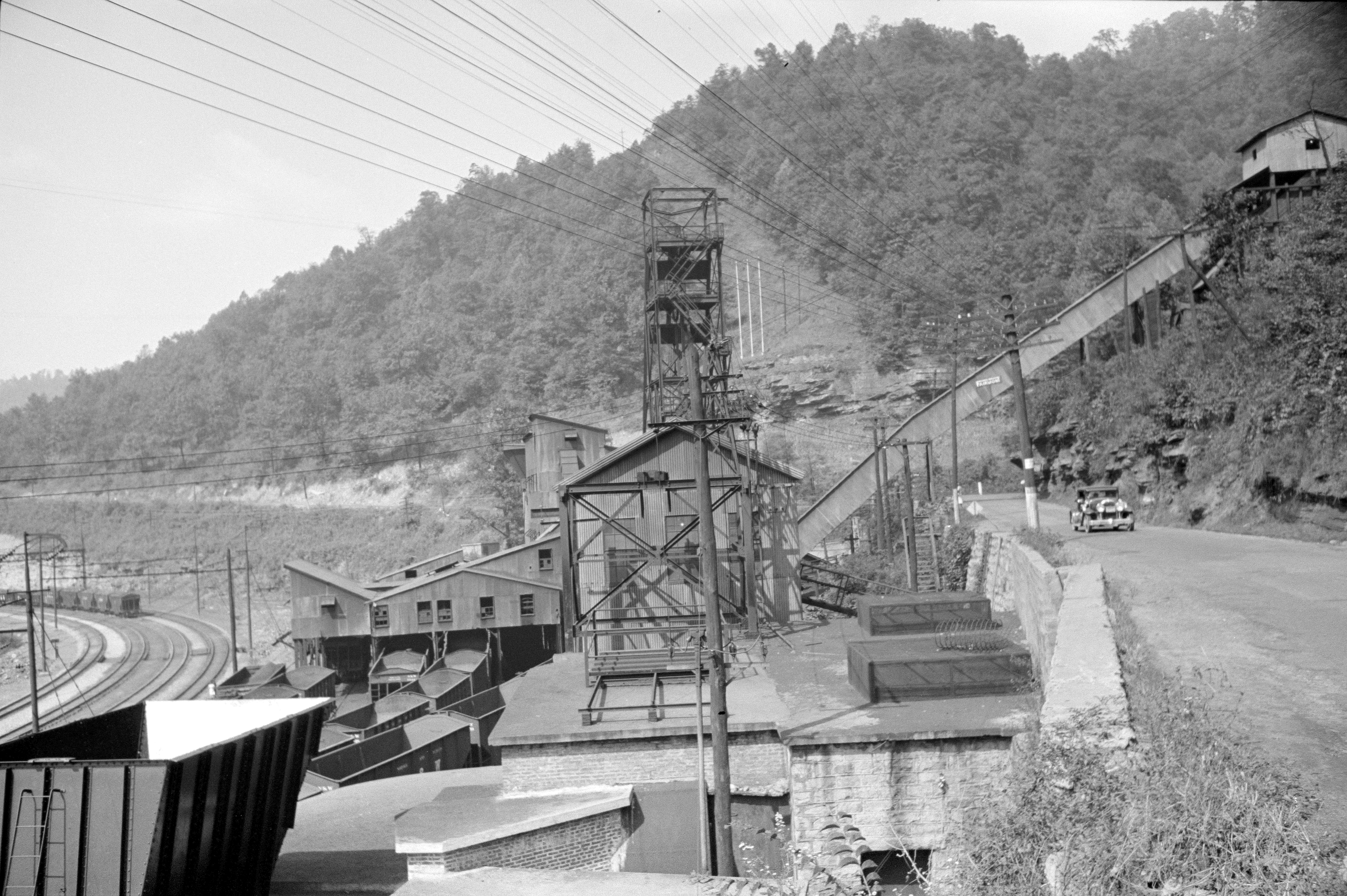
Machinery such as this coal tipple were destroyed by the Roving Pickets during their protests.

When the announcement came that miners and their families would no longer continue to receive their medical benefits from the UMWA Health and Retirement Funds, the miners took action and went on strike. Miners and their families who had lost health care benefits from the UWMA Health and Retirement Funds in the 1950s traveled from mine to mine in caravans protesting. The goal was to shut down non-union mines and those mines that were not paying the $0.40 per ton royalty fee, and to encourage non-union mines to organize themselves. These traveling protestors became known as the "Roving Picketers".

The threat of violence from the Roving Picketers got the attention of authorities at the federal level. In 1963, President John F. Kennedy assembled a task force, as part of the Appalachian Regional Commission, with the goal of preserving the union hospitals. The task force successfully created a grant program that would allow non-profits to fund and operate the hospitals. This desire was part of a larger movement of the federal government intervening in Appalachia through antipoverty programs during the Kennedy and Johnson administrations.

The Roving Picket movement was not necessarily a peaceful movement. There was some diplomacy through lobbying attempts with the federal government. However, the picketers blew up coal tipples, buildings, and trucks as part of their dissatisfaction. There were also instances of arson, shootings, and beatings, and personal property such as cars and homes were also blown up.

Berman Gibson was the leader of the Roving Picket Movement and believed in lobbying elected officials to achieve the goal of getting the medical cards reinstated. Gibson and his followers were making plans for a miners' march on Washington D.C. during the spring of 1963, which got the attention of President Kennedy. Kennedy was already concerned about growing civil rights unrest, and shortly after the miners made their intentions of a march known, the President created a task force within his cabinet to save the miners hospital.

== Legacy ==
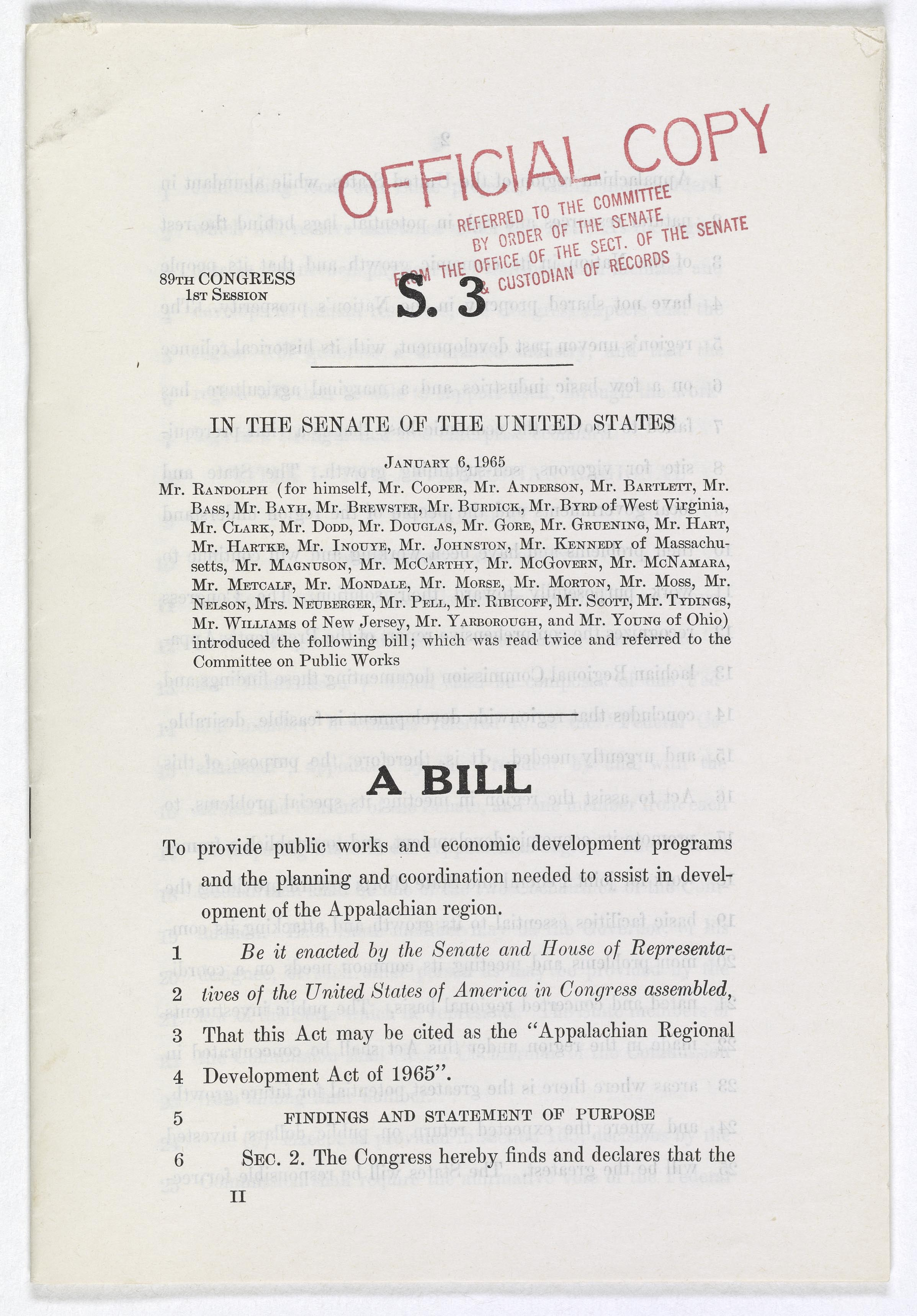
The Appalachian Regional Development Act. The page shown has a description of the act and what it was made to try to accomplish.

The Roving Picket Movement had a lasting impact not only in eastern Kentucky but on the entire Appalachian region. This was because the movement changed in 1963 from a miners' resistance to a movement for the poor known as the antipoverty movement. Kennedy started the efforts of the antipoverty movement, but after his assassination Lyndon Johnson took office and continued the efforts of the movement. The miners involved with the Roving Pickets traveled to Washington to make sure that the Appalachian region was not forgotten about and that legislation would be put in place. Johnson didn't forget about those miners and stated in his inaugural speech that there was going to be an "unconditional war on poverty" and even thanked the Appalachia region for their extra effort. Johnson instituted important legislation that worked to improve life for miners and the growth of the Appalachian region. One such piece of legislation was the Appalachian Regional Development Act which was instituted in March 1965 and renewed in 1967. The act established the Appalachian Regional Commission, which was tasked with creating and overseeing programs that would create economic growth in the region.

Miners continued to strike and fight for improvements in Appalachia after the Roving Picket movement ended, but the Roving Pickets actions to help the poor and the demand for federal legislation to aid Appalachia set a strong legacy in the region. Across the Appalachian region new legislation was being put into place because of continued activism by miners, such as the Employee Retirement Income Security Act of 1974 and the Federal Coal Mine Health and Safety Act of 1969.
