= 2024 pro-Palestinian Tax Day protests =

2024 demonstrations

Tax Day protests
- Date: April 15, 2024
- Location: United States

A series of pro-Palestinian protests were held in the United States on April 15 (Tax Day), 2024.

== Background ==
- Gaza war protests
  - Gaza war protests in the United States
- 2024 pro-Palestinian protests on university campuses
  - List of pro-Palestinian protests on university campuses in 2024

== Locations and activities ==
Described as a "coordinated day of economic protest against the Israel-Gaza war", the demonstration saw participation in many cities. In Ann Arbor, Michigan, student demonstrators took over a stage at the University of Michigan's SpringFest. A rally in Bangor, Maine organized by members of the Coalition for Palestine and other groups was held outside the Margaret Chase Smith Federal Building and Courthouse. Chicago saw demonstrations on I-90 and I-294, with traffic at the entrance to O'Hare International Airport shut down.

In Detroit, officials prevented pro-Palestinian supporters from blocking the Ambassador Bridge. Fifty-two people were arrested in Eugene, Oregon, after traffic along I-5 was stopped. Ten people were arrested and charged with disorderly conduct in Middletown, Connecticut, after chaining themselves and blocking entrances to the Pratt & Whitney plant. There were arrests in New York City, where protesters crossed the Brooklyn Bridge. Philadelphia saw 67 arrests. In Portland, Maine, a protest was held outside a KeyBank location. Demonstrators in San Antonio blocked the entrance to Valero's headquarters. Seven people were arrested in St. Charles, Missouri.

=== California ===
In Long Beach, a rally was held outside City Hall.

In Los Angeles, students held a protest at the University of Southern California SJP also organized a rally at Occidental College.

Oakland saw a demonstration on I-880.

In San Francisco, the Golden Gate Bridge was shut down.

In San Diego, demonstrators marched from the County Administration Center to the San Diego Concourse.

=== Florida ===
There were arrests in Miami, where demonstrators tried to block the entrance to PortMiami.

Central Florida Queers for Palestine and the local chapter of the Democratic Socialists of America, among other groups, rallied outside the USPS office in downtown Orlando.

There was also a demonstration in Tampa.

=== Washington ===
In SeaTac, Washington, all lanes to the Seattle–Tacoma International Airport were blocked.

In Seattle, people gathered outside Husky Stadium by the University of Washington Link light rail station.

There was also a demonstration in Spokane.
