= 1982 Overtown riot =

Riot in Miami in 1982

- Part of race riots in Miami
- Date: December 28–30, 1982 (2 days)
- Location: Overtown, Miami, Florida, United States
- Caused by: Death of Nevell Johnson Jr. by police

Casualties
- Death: 1
- Injuries: 26
- Arrested: 43

The 1982 Overtown riot was a period of civil unrest in Miami, Florida, United States, from December 28 to 30, 1982. The riot was caused by the shooting death of an African American man in the city's Overtown neighborhood by a Latino police officer on December 28, leading to three days of disorder that resulted in one additional death, numerous injuries and arrests, and widespread property damage.

In the early 1980s, many black neighborhoods in Miami were experiencing issues such as high unemployment rates, poor living conditions, and widespread illicit drug usage. Additionally, tensions were high between the black community and the Miami Police Department (MPD) over several incidents of police brutality, culminating in the highly destructive 1980 Miami riots following the death of an African American man by several police officers. Also during this time, Miami was undergoing a change in demographics due to increased immigration from Latin America, with some black civic leaders viewing the changes as hurting the established African American community. By 1982, Hispanic American officers outnumbered African Americans in the MPD, and a majority of the Miami City Commission, which included Miami Mayor Maurice Ferré.

On December 28, 1982, Cuban-born MPD officer Luis Alvarez entered an amusement arcade with his partner in Overtown. Inside, the officer confronted Nevell Johnson Jr., an African American man, over a gun Johnson had on him. According to police reports, after Johnson made a sudden move, Alvarez shot him in the face at point-blank range, putting him in critical condition. He later died at the hospital the following day. Following the shooting, a large crowd gathered around the arcade and began throwing projectiles at police vehicles and setting trash fires. Police cordoned off several blocks surrounding the arcade and confronted the crowd, leading to several injuries and an additional death after police shot and killed a man who was attempting to break into a building. Rioting continued the following day, prompting city officials to declare a restricted area covering several hundred blocks around the arcade. Police were involved in numerous shootouts as they patrolled the area, and police helicopters dropped tear gas in an attempt to disperse the crowds. Sporadic rioting continued into the next night, but began to subside, with the restricted area opened on December 31. Over three nights of rioting, 1 person died, 26 were injured, and 43 were arrested. Alvarez, who was suspended with pay following the shooting, was charged by the state of Florida with manslaughter, though he was acquitted by an all-white jury in 1984. A later report issued by the MPD in 1985 stated that his use of deadly force had been justified, but that he may have violated other police procedures during the shooting.

The riot was one in a wave to hit not only Miami, but many large metropolitan areas in the United States during the 1980s. Following this one, Miami experienced another period of civil unrest after Alvarez's acquittal in 1984 and a riot in 1989 over another shooting death of an African American man by a Hispanic police officer. Discussing the causes of these riots, some historians have noted the rapid demographic changes occurring in many urban areas during the time period and fears of increased economic competition from other ethnic groups as factors. Additionally, some have pointed to cuts in financing for government social programs that were designed to help underprivileged areas such as Overtown. The riots hurt Miami's reputation, as many shows and movies depicting the city during the 1980s showed it as a crime- and drug-ridden locale. By the early 2000s, the neighborhood still had widespread drug usage and an unemployment rate of about 50 percent.

== Background ==
=== Overtown ===
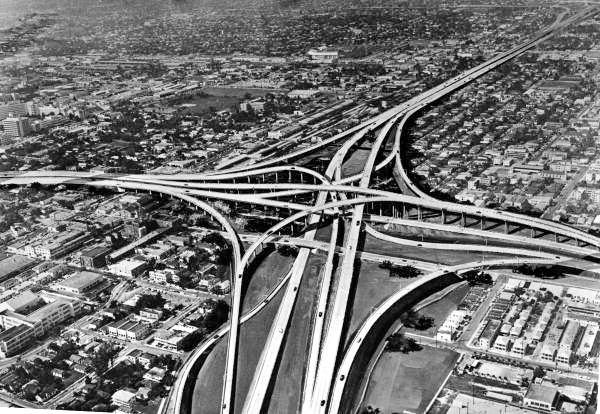
Interstates 95 and 395 were constructed in Overtown in the 1960s.

Overtown is a historically black neighborhood in Miami, located north of downtown. In 1982, the 4-square-mile (10 km^{2}) neighborhood was home to about 18,000 people, almost all African American, an ethnic group that constituted about 17 percent of the Miami metropolitan area's 1.6 million residents. Living conditions in the neighborhood around this time were generally considered poor compared to other parts of the city, with the United Press International calling the neighborhood "4 square miles of slum". In the 1960s, the construction of Interstates 95 and 395 through the central part of Overtown severely hurt the community, which experienced a severe economic decline through the second half of the 20th century, and by 1982, the neighborhood had an unemployment rate of about 50 percent. In 1980, the Urban League of Miami reported that the median income in Overtown and two other black neighborhoods (Coconut Grove and Liberty City) was $5,500 per year, which was equal to the poverty threshold established by the federal government. Overtown was also subject to a high crime rate and widespread use of illicit drugs, due in part to Miami's growth during this time as a center for the illegal drug trade of cocaine and marijuana. Concerning the African American community in Miami in the early 1980s, British journalist Andrew Neil of The Economist wrote, "Miami is not a good city in which to be black. Blacks, of course, have not fared well in any major American city. But their plight is particularly acute in Miami".

=== Demographics of Miami ===
The second half of the 20th century saw a change in Miami's demographics due to a surge in immigration of Latin Americans, with many coming from the Caribbean. By the early 1980s, city politics were primarily dominated by non-Hispanic whites and white Latinos. In 1982, the five-member Miami City Commission was composed of three Hispanic Americans, including Mayor Maurice Ferré, and only one African American. Additionally, of the 1,039 police officers of the Miami Police Department (MPD), only about 170 were black, while about 400 were Hispanic Americans. These changes in demographics led to increased tensions between the African American and Latino communities in the city, with some black civic leaders expressing concerns over losing economic resources to the Hispanic community and charged Hispanic police officers with being more likely to commit acts of police brutality against African Americans.

=== 1980 riots in Liberty City ===
On December 17, 1979, Arthur McDuffie, a 33-year-old African American attorney, was involved in a high-speed chase with Miami police after running a red light and displaying an obscene gesture while on his motorcycle. McDuffie died during the encounter, with the police stating that his death was the result of a motorcycle crash. However, a later investigation revealed that McDuffie had been beaten to death by the police. In March of the following year, four white police officers were charged with McDuffie's death and with attempting to falsify police reports, but on May 17, 1980, an all-white jury in Tampa, Florida, found them not guilty. Following the verdict, rioting broke out in Liberty City, just 2 miles (3.2 km) south of Overtown. Due to the size of the civil disturbance, 3,600 members of the Florida Army National Guard were called in, and from May 17 to May 19, three white people were beaten to death, while law enforcement officers killed 11 African Americans. In total, the riots resulted in 18 deaths, 1,100 arrests, and $804 million in property damage. According to historian Sharon Wright Austin, the riots were "one of the most destructive" in Miami's history and the first of several to occur during the 1980s as a result of "some form of police abuse against an African American man". The death of McDuffie and the accompanying riots were one of a handful of violent incidents involving police and black Miamians in the late 1970s and early 1980s.

== Death of Nevell Johnson Jr. ==
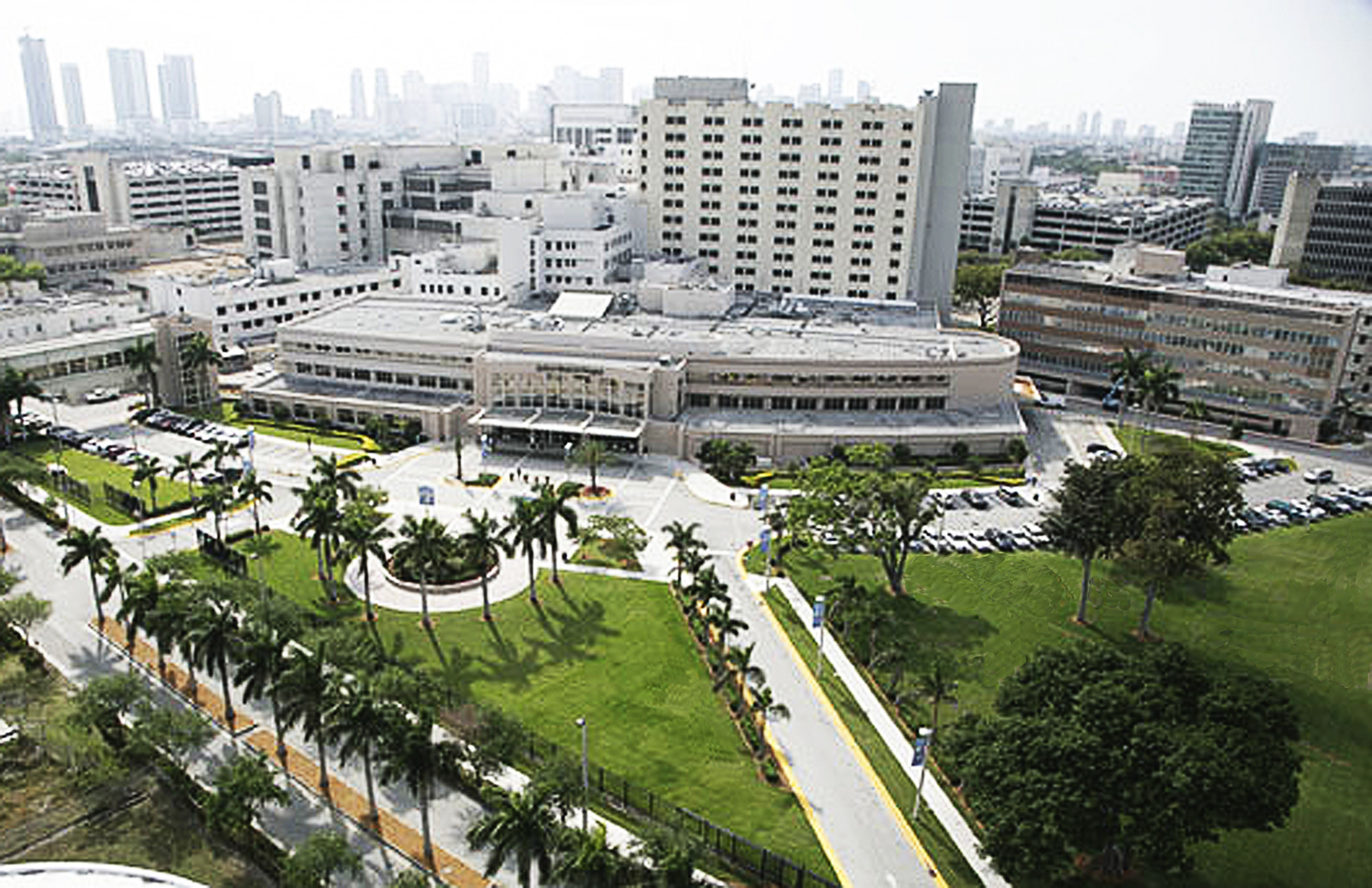
Following the shooting, Johnson was rushed to Jackson Memorial Hospital (pictured 2016), where he died the following day.

On December 28, 1982, at a little after 6:00 p.m. EST, two Latino police officers, Luis Alvarez and Louis Cruz, entered an amusement arcade (Note: Reporting in The New York Times refers to the establishment as a "pool hall", and the term is repeated in a 2016 history book that discusses the riot. However, several other sources refer to the establishment as an amusement arcade with arcade video games, including the United Press International ("video game room" and "video arcade"), The Washington Post ("video gameroom [sic]"), and The Crisis ("video-game arcade"). Additionally, later reporting on the shooting by The New York Times refers to the establishments as a "video arcade".) in Overtown as part of what Police Chief Kenneth I. Harms stated was a routine inspection for narcotics violations. Alvarez, a Cuban immigrant, was 23 years old and had been an officer with the MPD for about 18 months. The two officers had initially been on a patrol in a nearby Latino part of the city, but had decided to go into Overtown, with a later report stating that Alvarez wanted to show Cruz, a trainee, how to conduct a routine check. The arcade, located less than a mile from Miami's central business district, was well known among police as a place where drug trafficking occurred. Inside the arcade, the officers saw Nevell Johnson Jr., an African American courier in his early 20s (Note: Sources vary regarding his age between 20 and 21.) who was playing an arcade video game. According to the officers, they saw a bulge in Johnson's clothes that they believed was a gun. The officers stated that, after Johnson confirmed it was a gun, Alvarez put his left hand on it while he drew his own .38 caliber police revolver with his right hand. According to the officer, after Johnson made a sudden move, Alvarez shot him, believing that he was trying to reach for his gun. However, several eyewitnesses to the event stated that the shooting by Alvarez was unprovoked. The bullet struck Johnson at point-blank range, hitting him just above his left eye. Johnson, in critical condition, was quickly rushed to Jackson Memorial Hospital, where he laid in a coma for about 24 hours. He died the next day, December 29, at 6:45 p.m.

Following the shooting, there were conflicting reports on whether or not Johnson was armed. Though a revolver was found on the ground next to Johnson's body, an article in The Washington Post published shortly after his death states that his family and friends said Johnson was unarmed, and an article on the shooting in The Crisis states that some reports said that the weapon had been planted by police. However, a cousin of Johnson's who was at the arcade at the time of the incident stated that Johnson had been armed during the police encounter.

== Course of the riot ==
After Johnson's shooting, a crowd of about 150 to 200 people gathered around the building, prompting the police to call in reinforcements to the scene. When homicide investigators arrived, the crowd grew agitated, and several trash fires were set off in the area. As the police cordoned 100 city blocks surrounding the scene of the shooting, violence escalated, with dozens of individuals throwing projectiles such as rocks and bottles at police vehicles, even setting one police car on fire. In the evening, police shot and killed one individual, stating that he was attempting to break and enter a business. Rioting lasted for a few hours until 9 p.m., when authorities summoned local black civic leaders to address the crowd and attempt to restore order. At a press conference held later that night from the MPD headquarters, City Manager Howard D. Gary, a black man, stated that the police had "acted professionally", while City Commissioner Miller Dawkins, who was also black, stated that the shooting would be given a "thorough, complete and unbiased investigation". In total, 8 people were injured in the first night of rioting, with 7, including 1 police officer, treated at Jackson Memorial Hospital.

The following day, December 29, rioting resumed, primarily taking place in a 105 block area surrounding the arcade. City Manager Gary declared a "restricted zone" of 135 blocks, later expanded to 250 blocks, or roughly 3 square miles (7.8 km^{2}). Only residents of the area were allowed to enter or exit this zone with proper identification, and all liquor stores and gas stations were ordered to close. According to an eyewitness to the second night of rioting, there were about 200 to 300 people who were involved in the civil unrest. Five cars, including three police cars, were torched on the second night of rioting in addition to several more damaged, and at one point, a group of several dozen African American men became involved in a shootout with police on an elevated highway in the neighborhood, prompting the temporary closure of a portion of I-95. Over a dozen stores were damaged amidst widespread looting, with one building being damaged by a car driven through its front. Police helicopters patrolled the neighborhood and dropped canisters of tear gas in an effort to disperse the crowds. Officers worked 12-hour shifts performing patrols of the area, and while there were reports of crowds gathering in Liberty City, there was no evidence of them by the time law enforcement officials arrived. In total, 13 people were treated for minor injuries suffered during the second night of rioting at local hospitals. Rioting quieted down through the night, and at 11 p.m., City Manager Gary announced that Overtown was "secure and calm".

On December 29, it was announced that the two officers involved in Johnson's shooting, as well as the one who had shot and killed someone on the first night of rioting, had been placed on suspension with pay. A spokesperson for Florida Governor Bob Graham stated that, if requested, the state would provide Miami with additional support in the form of National Guardsmen or members of the Florida Highway Patrol. Speaking about the riots while in Palm Springs, California, President Ronald Reagan stated, "I just don't think there is any room for that—violence in the streets". While minor civil unrest continued sporadically into the following day, resulting in several more injuries and arrests, things began to calm down in the neighborhood. By December 31, the restricted zone had been lifted, with people free to travel within the neighborhood and gas stations and liquor stores allowed to reopen. Additionally, police coverage began to return to normal levels as "special field forces" that had been on patrol in the area were called off. In total, the rioting lasted for three days, from December 28 to 30. In total, 1 person had died in the rioting and 26 sustained some form of injury. Additionally, the police had arrested 43 individuals.

== Aftermath ==
=== Later events ===
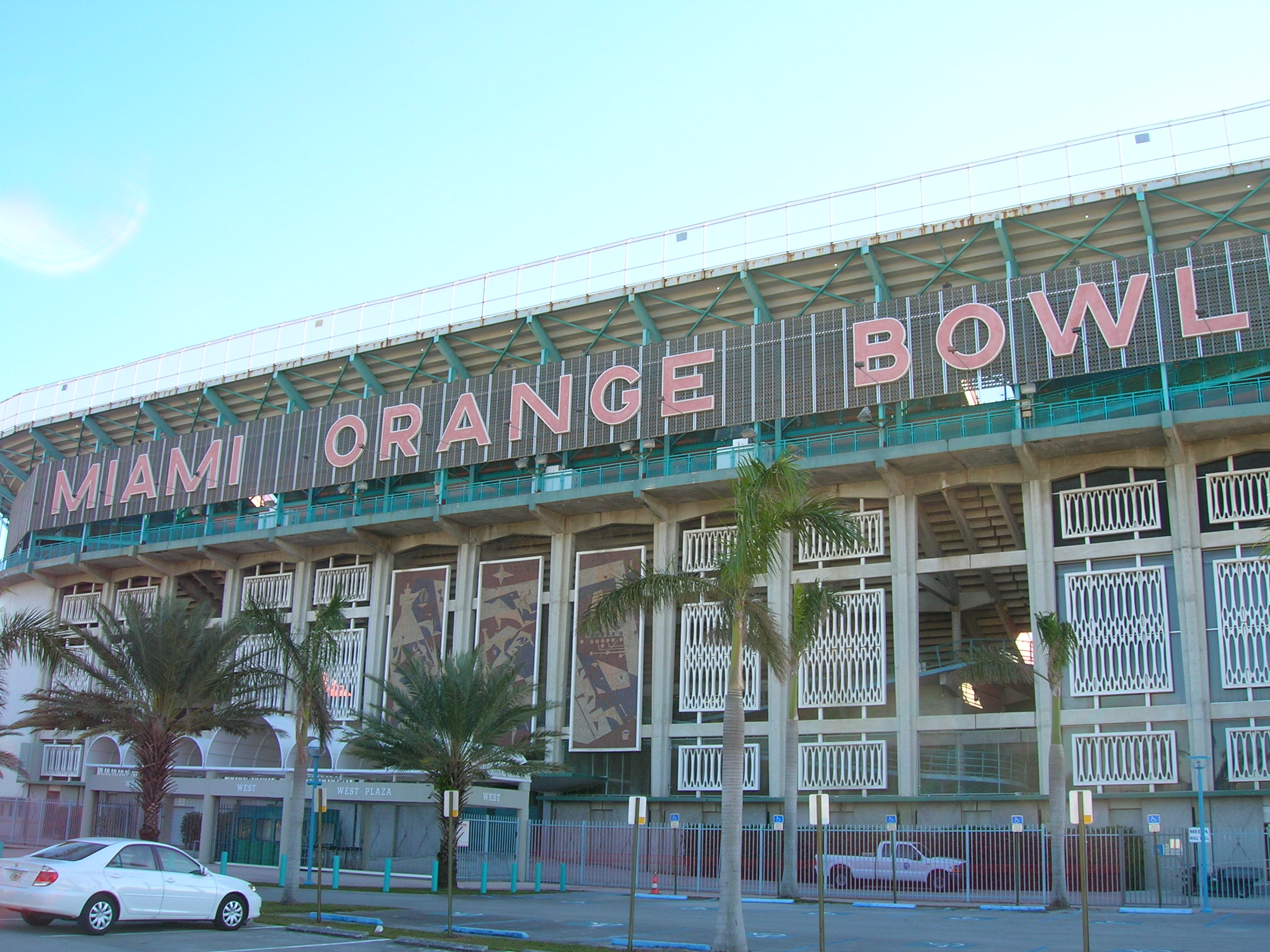
The 1983 Orange Bowl was held just days after the riot at the Miami Orange Bowl (pictured 2006), near Overtown.

Several days after the rioting, on January 1, 1983, the 1983 Orange Bowl football game was played at the Miami Orange Bowl, located just six blocks from Overtown. The director for the Dade County tourism board stated that thousands of dollars had been spent promoting the event in an attempt to help revive Miami's economy, and while there had been some safety concerns regarding the riots, the bowl game went ahead as planned. On December 29, during the rioting, the stadium hosted a high school band competition as part of pre-game festivities, and a parade held the day of the game passed close by the previous restricted zone established just days prior. However, due in part to the riot, the game saw a dip in ticket purchases compared to previous years. That same month, Johnson's parents held a funeral for their son, and while the family opted against a planned march due to fears that it would lead to more violence, roughly 1,000 people attended his wake.

=== Investigations, trial, and subsequent unrest ===
Following Johnson's death, the United States Department of Justice ordered the Miami field office of the Federal Bureau of Investigation (FBI) to investigate it. Additional investigations into the shooting were initiated by the MPD, the city manager's office, and the NAACP, while City Manager Gary assembled a blue-ribbon committee composed of 35 Overtown locals to log complaints from neighborhood residents. Reporters in Miami noted that Alvarez, who had been with the MPD for a year and a half prior to the shooting, had been the subject of seven internal investigations by the MPD over complaints against the officer from citizens. In May 1983, a grand jury indicted Alvarez for criminal negligence, and he was charged by the state of Florida with manslaughter. The charges carried a maximum penalty of 15 years of prison sentence and a fine of $5,000. While the trial was postponed several times through 1983, jury selection began in January 1984, with the case to be overseen by Judge David M. Gersten of the Dade County Circuit Court. Alvarez was represented by defense attorney Roy Black, while Edward Cowart served as the state's chief prosecutor. Judge Gersten denied a motion by the defense to move the trial outside of Miami. In the leadup to the trial, the MPD began denying vacation time for officers and prepared for possible civil unrest. The case was the fourth one within the year to deal with a police officer in Miami or Dade County who was charged with manslaughter. At the same time, the Johnson family filed an $11 million civil case against Alvarez and the city of Miami.

The trial lasted for several weeks, during which time Alvarez received financial assistance for his $86,000 in legal fees from the Hispanic American Confederation, an organization of Hispanic American police officers. On Thursday, March 15, 1984, Alvarez was acquitted by the jury. The verdict spurred additional civil unrest in Miami over the next few days, with police in riot gear making sweeps through black neighborhoods and arresting many, detaining some in horse trailers. By March 17, about 20 businesses were reported as being looted, while 300 people were arrested in the Miami metropolitan area. Additionally, 17 people were treated for minor injuries, including 4 police officers. The 1984 unrest was considered much less violent than the 1982 event and far less destructive than the riots that followed the 1980 acquittal. In the 1987 book Miami, author Joan Didion wrote of the 1984 events, "order was restored in Miami just after midnight on Saturday morning, which was applauded locally as progress, not even a riot". Multiple sources note that Alvarez was acquitted by an all-white jury, with Ray Fauntroy (president of the local Miami chapter of the Southern Christian Leadership Conference and brother of politician Walter Fauntroy) saying at the time, "People are tired of this, being shot down in the streets by white cops who are acquitted by white juries".

On September 12, 1984, United States Attorney Stanley Marcus announced that Alvarez would not face charges of violating federal civil rights laws, saying that there was not enough evidence for a case against the police officer. On July 23, 1985, the MPD released its final report on the shooting, stating that Alvarez was justified in his use of deadly force, but could face disciplinary action for other items related to the shooting, such as untruthfulness and leaving his post. At the time, Alvarez was still on paid leave from the department and was seeking to regain his job.

=== Analysis ===
Many historians view the 1982 riot, which was the city's most destructive since the 1980 riots, in the context of a wave of rioting that occurred during the 1980s not only in Miami, but in many large metropolitan areas throughout the United States. Concerning the riots in a 1996 book, historian Paul A. Gilje noted that there were several major riots involving African American or Hispanic communities in multiple large cities during the decade, while political scientist Michael Jones-Correa stated in a 2001 book, "Given that in the 1980s many of the nation's major cities experienced rapid demographic transformations while government cutbacks left new immigrants and older residents in poorer areas of these cities vulnerable to economic restructuring and openly engaged in competition for scarce resources, it should not have come as a surprise that four of the top immigrant-receiving metropolitan areas [Los Angeles, New York City, Miami, and Washington, D.C.] were convulsed by serious civil disturbances by the early 1990s". Jones-Correa further notes several riots in these areas that "involved a mix of recent immigrants and resident minorities", such as the 1982 riot in Overtown. In 1989, Miami was the scene of another violent period of civil unrest following the death of a black man by a Hispanic police officer.

The riots further damaged relations between the city's African American and Hispanic communities, with several black civic leaders arguing that the influx of immigrants from Latin America had shifted resources and attention away from issues facing the city's black community. Multiple commentators drew comparisons between the wave of riots in the 1980s to those in previous decades, with Gilje comparing them to the ghetto riots of the 1960s and historian John Lowe stating in a 2016 book that the 1982 riot "gave Miami the air of the last Southern redoubt of racial turmoil, summoning memories of the riots in other cities during the sixties and seventies". Further discussing the impact of government cutbacks, journalist Edward Cody wrote in a 1982 article for The Washington Post that, "The latest violence...underlined the extent to which economic recession, coupled with cutbacks in federal spending programs, has hit particularly hard among blacks". Many civic leaders in Miami's black community also made note about the lack of funding for social programs aimed at addressing economic issues in Overtown, citing unemployment and other economic factors as indirect causes for the riot. Mayor Ferré echoed these sentiments when he placed blame on the Reagan administration for cutting social programs aimed at helping communities such as Overtown. The riots additionally hurt Miami's reputation in popular culture, with several television shows and movies produced during the decade that depicted Miami as a violent, crime- and drug-ridden city, such as Miami Vice and Scarface. As of the early 2000s, Overtown remained an economically depressed neighborhood, with the unemployment rate still at about 50 percent.

== See also ==
- African Americans in Florida
- Cuban migration to Miami
- List of incidents of civil unrest in the United States

== Sources ==
- "Report Says Deadly Force Justified In Shooting That Sparked Overtown Riots". Associated Press. July 23, 1985. Archived from the original on January 21, 2023.
- Atkinson, Rick (March 17, 1984). "Miami Able to Sidestep Replay of Bloody Racial Riots of 1980". The Washington Post. Archived from the original on May 26, 2022.
- Austin, Sharon D. Wright (2018). The Caribbeanization of Black Politics: Race, Group Consciousness, and Political Participation in America. Albany, New York: State University of New York Press. ISBN 978-1-4384-6809-9.
- Cody, Edward (December 31, 1982). "Miami Racial Tensions Fester". The Washington Post. ISSN 0190-8286. Archived from the original on January 2, 2020.
- Cody, Edward (January 1, 1983). "Orange Bowl Parade Proceeds as Miami Racial Violence Cools". The Washington Post. Archived from the original on January 21, 2023.
- Didion, Joan (1987). Miami. New York: Simon & Schuster. ISBN 978-0671646646.
- Didion, Joan (2006). We Tell Ourselves Stories in Order to Live: Collected Nonfiction. Introduction by John Leonard. New York City: Alfred A. Knopf. ISBN 978-0-307-26487-9.
- Gilje, Paul A. (1996). Rioting in America. Bloomington, Indiana: Indiana University Press. ISBN 978-0-253-32988-2.
- Herman, Max Arthur (2005). Fighting in the Streets: Ethnic Succession and Urban Unrest in Twentieth Century America. New York City: Peter Lang. ISBN 978-0-8204-7455-7.
- Jones-Correa, Michael (2001). "Structural Shifts and Institutional Capacity: Possibilities for Ethnic Cooperation and Conflict in Urban Settings". In Jones-Correa, Michael (ed.). Governing American Cities: Inter-Ethnic Coalitions, Competition, and Conflict. New York City: Russell Sage Foundation. pp. 183–209. ISBN 978-1-61044-321-0.
- Lowe, John (2016). "CircumCaribbean Sisterhood: Patterns of Migration in Cristina Garcia's The Agüero Sisters". In Graham, Maryemma; Raussert, Wilfried (eds.). Mobile and Entangled America(s). London: Routledge. pp. 25–50. ISBN 978-1-317-09529-3.
- Miller, Matt (2010). "Tropic of Bass: Culture, Commerce, and Controversy in Miami Rap". In Hess, Mickey (ed.). Hip Hop in America: A Regional Guide. Vol. 1: East Coast and West Coast. Santa Barbara, California: Greenwood Publishing Group. pp. 577–604. ISBN 978-0-313-34321-6.
- Miller, Vivien (2012). "Miami, Florida". In Miller, Wilbur R. (ed.). The Social History of Crime and Punishment in America. Vol. 1: A-De. Thousand Oaks, California: SAGE Publications. pp. 1099–1101. ISBN 978-1-4129-8876-6.
- Moss, Kevin (January 1983). "Racial Injustice in Miami". The Crisis. 90 (1). NAACP: 48–49.
- "Rioting in a Black Area of Miami Follows a Shooting by the Police". The New York Times. December 29, 1982. p. 8. ISSN 0362-4331. Archived from the original on August 2, 2022.
- Perline, Irvin H.; Goldschmidt, Jona (2004). The Psychology and Law of Workplace Violence: A Handbook for Mental Health Professionals and Employers. Springfield, Illinois: Charles C Thomas. ISBN 978-0-398-07432-6.
- Shumow, Moses; Gutsche, Robert E. Jr. (2016). News, Neoliberalism, and Miami's Fragmented Urban Space. Foreword by Juliet Pinto. Lanham, Maryland: Lexington Books. ISBN 978-1-4985-0199-6.
- Speck, Mary (December 29, 1982). "Police sealed off a 250-square-block area of the Overtown..." United Press International.
- Stuart, Reginald (January 19, 1984). "Trial Begins in Police Shooting Case that Led to Miami Riots". The New York Times. p. 18. ISSN 0362-4331. Archived from the original on October 8, 2015.
- Teaford, Jon C. (2006). The Metropolitan Revolution: The Rise of Post-urban America. New York City: Columbia University Press. ISBN 978-0-231-13372-2.
- "Overtown: 4 square miles of slum". United Press International. December 29, 1982a.
- "Overtown Violence Worst Since Liberty City". United Press International. December 29, 1982b. Archived from the original on January 20, 2022.
- "U.S. Won't Prosecute Officer Who Touched Off Miami Riots". The New York Times. United Press International. September 12, 1984. p. 28. ISSN 0362-4331. Archived from the original on May 24, 2015.
