= 1990 Wynwood riot =

Race riot in Florida

- Date: December 3, 1990
- Location: Wynwood neighborhood of Dade County, Florida
- Caused by: officers acquitted of death of Leonardo Mercado

Casualties
- Death: 0
- Injuries: 0

The Wynwood riot occurred in December 1990 in Wynwood, Florida. After the acquittal of officers who had beaten to death a small time drug dealer named Leonardo Mercado, locals rioted causing $3 million in property damage. The incident would later be called the Mercado riot.

== Events ==
=== Prelude and sparking incident ===
By 1990 the Wynwood neighborhood of Miami was generally impoverished and home to many Puerto Rican residents. Local Puerto Ricans had noted how little Puerto Rican representation existed in Miami. After the riot Emilio Lopez, president of the Borinquen Health Care Center in Wynwood would go on to say "I dare you to find in the city of Miami a Puerto Rican in a position of authority", and "If he is, he is so entangled with the establishment that he won't do anything for his people."

Leonardo Mercado was a suspected small time drug dealer in the neighborhood. Police officers Pablo Camacho, Andy Watson, Tom Trujillo, Charlie Haynes, and Nathaniel Veal Jr. (members of the Miami Police Department's undercover Street Narcotics Unit) confronted Mercado. In 1988 they met Mercado outside his apartment because of a suspected death threat he had made. The officers ordered him inside his apartment then allegedly proceeded to beat him to death. The officers were charged each with one count of conspiracy and three counts of civil rights violations. On December 3, 1990, all the officers were acquitted.

=== Riot ===
On December 3, 1990, the day of the officers acquittal, a mob erupted into violence in the Wynwood neighborhood shortly after 6:30pm. Many of the rioters were Puerto Rican residents. One local, Clemente Montalvo, told The New York Times about the riot, “We want people to know we exist. Cubans get everything; we get nothing.” For about three hours the neighborhood was put under siege by the mob until 200 patrolmen restored order to the neighborhood. Many cars were overturned and businesses set ablaze, but no serious injuries or deaths were reported.

== See also ==
- Race riots in Miami
- 1980 Miami riots
