= Latino National Survey, 2006 =

The Latino National Survey (LNS) contains 8,634 completed interviews (unweighted) of self-identified Latino residents of the United States. Interviewing began on November 17, 2005, and continued through August 4, 2006. The survey instrument contained approximately 165 distinct items ranging from demographic descriptions to political attitudes and policy preferences, as well as a variety of social indicators and experiences. All interviewers were bilingual, English and Spanish.

Respondents were greeted in both languages and were immediately offered the opportunity to interview in either language. Interviewers also provided a consent script that allowed respondents to opt out of the survey. Demographic variables include age, ancestry, birthplace, education level, ethnicity, marital status, military service, number of people in the household, number of children under the age of 18 living in the household, political party affiliation, political ideology, religiosity, religious preference, race, and sex.

The principal investigators of the LNS were Luis Fraga of the University of Washington, John A. Garcia of the University of Arizona, Rodney Hero of the University of Notre Dame, Michael Jones-Correa of Cornell University, Valerie Martinez-Ebers of Texas Christian University, and Gary M. Segura of the University of Washington.
