= 1989 Miami riot =

Unrest after the shooting of Clement Lloyd

- Part of Race riots in Miami
- Date: January 16–19, 1989 (3 days)
- Location: Overtown and Liberty City neighborhoods, Miami, Florida
- Caused by: Police shooting; general frustration
- Methods: Riot, property destruction, looting

Lead figures
William Lozano	Clement Lloyd, Allan Blanchard

Casualties and losses
Lozano tried for manslaughter and acquitted. 3 police officers injured	2 fatalities: Lloyd and Blanchard; 7 injured;

The 1989 Miami riot was sparked after Miami Police Department (MPD) officer William Lozano shot black motorcyclist Clement Lloyd on January 16, 1989. Lloyd, 23, was fleeing another MPD officer, who was chasing him for an alleged traffic violation. Lozano was on foot investigating an unrelated incident, heard about the situation on his police radio, and later said the motorcycle "veered toward him". He fired a shot at the motorcycle, striking Lloyd in the head and killing him instantly. The motorcycle crashed into an oncoming car, injuring two occupants. Lloyd's passenger, Allan Blanchard, 24, died the next day from his injuries. Several black witnesses said that Lozano walked almost to the center of the street with his handgun and poised ready to shoot for several seconds as the motorcycle approached. Some African American residents of Miami expressed the view that Lozano's actions were motivated by racial prejudice and that the shooting of Lloyd was not an act of self-defense. Rioting began almost immediately after the shooting in Overtown, and on the next day in Liberty City, both predominantly black neighborhoods of Miami, and continued until January 19, when the Chicago Bulls, including star player Michael Jordan, played a scheduled game in Overtown against the Miami Heat, who were in their inaugural season. The shooting and subsequent riots occurred within a week of Super Bowl XXIII, drawing significant international attention as Miami was the host city for the event. Schools were closed and police cordoned off a 130-block area and teargassed rioting crowds.

Lozano was convicted of manslaughter; not until 2015, when Nouman Raja was charged in the shooting of Corey Jones, was another Florida law enforcement officer sentenced for an on-duty shooting. But Lozano was granted a new trial on the basis that the trial should not have been held in Miami, because of racial tensions, and that the prosecution should not have been allowed to introduce evidence about police procedures and Lozano's training. In overturning Lozano's conviction, the appeals court argued that the jury had been influenced by fears that failing to convict would lead to further unrest. A new trial was held in Orlando, Florida, and Lozano was acquitted.

== See also ==
- 1968 Miami riot
- 1980 Miami riots
- List of incidents of civil unrest in the United States
