= 1968 Miami riot =

1968 Miami Riot
- Part of the Civil Rights Movement
- Date: August 7–8, 1968 (1 day)
- Location: Liberty City (Miami)
- Caused by: Deplorable housing conditions; Racial discrimination; Poor economic conditions; Poor police-community relations; Economic competition with Cuban refugees

Parties
Vote Power League; Southern Christian Leadership Conference (SCLC); Congress of Racial Equality (CORE); Student Nonviolent Coordinating Committee (SNCC)	Florida Army National Guard; Florida Highway Patrol; Miami Police Department

Lead figures
SCLC member: Ralph Abernathy	Governor of Florida: Claude Kirk; Mayor of Miami-Dade County: Chuck Hall

Casualties
- Deaths: 3
- Injuries: 29
- Arrested: 200

A group of black organizations in Miami called for "a mass rally of concerned Black people," to take place on August 7, 1968, at the Vote Power building in Liberty City, a black neighborhood. Sponsors were the Vote Power League, the Southern Christian Leadership Conference (SCLC), the Congress of Racial Equality (CORE), the Student Nonviolent Coordinating Committee (SNCC), and numerous smaller organizations. The protest was not provoked by a specific incident, but was intended "to show their frustration with the nation's unfair political, social, and economic systems." Another scholar described the root causes as "discrimination, proscription, and segregation." A more extensive statement from the same scholar says the "major grievances... included deplorable housing conditions, economic exploitation, bleak employment prospects, racial discrimination, poor police-community relations, and economic competition with Cuban refugees." The date was chosen to coincide (because of the publicity opportunity) with the Republican National Convention being held in Miami Beach.

== Events ==
=== Outbreak ===
After a white reporter was forcibly ejected from the "Blacks Only" rally, Miami police responded with five cars and a carbine unit, which exacerbated tensions. A white man in a car brandishing a "Wallace for President" bumper sticker attempted to drive through the vicinity. As he passed the Vote Power building, his automobile was met with a barrage of stones and bottles and crashed into another car. The driver fled on foot, and his car was overturned and set on fire. Vandals ransacked white-owned businesses in Liberty City's commercial district. Police eventually quelled the outbreak with tear gas.

=== Meetings and escalation ===
Florida governor Claude Kirk and SCLC president Ralph Abernathy, both attending the Republican National Convention, and Metro-Dade County mayor Chuck Hall arrived and held a meeting with community spokesmen. No actions to resolve the black communities' issues were agreed on. The Governor suggested that they continue the discussion at 11 AM the following morning.

When, the following day, Kirk and local authorities only sent emissaries and did not appear themselves, larger-scale violence broke out. Rioters stoned police, fire-bombed area markets, and looted white-owned shops. Miami officials requested assistance from the Florida Highway Patrol, which used a cloud of tear gas dispensed by a modified version of an insect-control machine to restore order. That afternoon Miami police, responding to what they thought was sniper fire, killed two residents and left a fourteen-year-old boy with a bullet through his chest. No weapons were found in the vicinity. Police, fearing that the unrest would spread to the Overtown neighborhood, shot and killed an unarmed man there as well.

=== National Guard deployment ===
The Florida National Guard was called out, and a dusk-to-dawn curfew was imposed. 800 National Guard and 200 sheriff deputies restored order, and heavy rains the next day ended the riot.

== See also ==
- 1980 Miami riots
- 1989 Miami riot
- List of incidents of civil unrest in the United States
