= Race riots in Miami =

- Date: 1980s
- Location: Miami, Florida
- Caused by: Variety of factors including...: Cuban exile; Economic inequality; Police brutality

Race riots in Miami include a series of violent events that occurred in Miami mainly through the 1980s. After desegregation, much of the racial violence in Miami had calmed only to be reignited by the 1980s. The decade of riots were the result of policing controversies and ethnic tensions fueled by the perceived threat of recent immigrants to African Americans on the Miami job market.

== Background ==
In the United States through the 1960s, desegregation was empowering once disadvantaged African American communities to reach new political and economic gains. In Miami the Cuban exile seemed to undercut new African American gains as Cubans began to compete for jobs, residence, and political power. The later perceived successes of many Cubans gave a feeling of powerlessness to local African Americans. Many Cuban refugees lacked English language skills and ended up living in lower income neighborhoods and taking up blue collar jobs that many African Americans also held. In 1963, Ebony magazine characterized the Cuban exile as an "invasion" bringing in "grave social and economic problems."

By 1968, Miami witnessed a riot in its Liberty City neighborhood during the 1968 Republican National Convention, caused by the frustration African Americans faced in the country. By the 1970s, the Hispanic population of Miami outnumbered the African American population and more Hispanic owned businesses had been opened than African American owned businesses.

Between the 1968 Miami riot and the 1980 Miami riots, up to thirteen "mini-riots" would occur in Miami, all stemming from police confrontations with African-Americans.

== Riots and incidents ==
=== 1970 Brownsville riots ===
The 1970 riots were race riots that began in the Brownsville neighborhood of Miami in shootings that injured six people, of four blacks and two whites and then spread to the neighborhoods of Liberty City and Coconut Grove despite a curfew in place. Six blacks were injured in clashes with police followed by sniper fire and firebombing attacks. Riot police were then withdrawn with black volunteer patrols then put in place.

=== 1980 Arthur McDuffie riots ===
The 1980 riots were race riots that occurred in Miami, starting in earnest on May 18, 1980, following the acquittal of five white police officers who had fatally beaten black motorcyclist Arthur McDuffie.

=== 1982 Overtown riot ===
After the accidental police shooting of a man in an Overtown video arcade, a riot broke out in the neighborhood. Cars were burned, businesses were looted, and police were shot at. Ivey Kearson, director of the Overtown Jobs Program, said of the riot's cause "unemployment in the area is 50 percent or higher." "Most of the people here, they don't see anything happening for them and their neighbors and the guy down the street." "It's not just going to be in Miami and it's not going to just be blacks. People feel they have to react violently." The policemen in the original arcade shooting were Latin American. "Leave these Latins get out of here, right now," shouted the Rev. Jonathan Rolle, in a television interview about the incident. Later, in a phone interview, he would say, "The Latin police, they just ride around in their cars, and they never get out". ". . . . The Latins are the ones who are killing the blacks."

=== 1989 Miami riot ===
The 1989 Miami riot came after police officer William Lozano shot Clement Lloyd, who was fleeing another officer on a motorcycle. He crashed and his passenger, Allan Blanchard, was also killed. Four days of rioting later took place in Overtown. On January 21 after the shooting, violence erupted in Overtown and the next day in Liberty City. Schools were closed and police cordoned off a 130-block area and teargassed rioting crowds.

== Aftermath ==
=== "Quiet riot" ===
After the arrest of Haitian demonstrators picketing a Cuban owned business, believed to have harassed Haitian customers, and the condemnation of Nelson Mandela's visit to Miami by many Cuban city officials, many black business organizations boycotted Miami entirely throughout the summer of 1990. This boycott was dubbed at the time as a "quiet riot". The boycott was noteworthy for its peaceful and successful tactics as compared to the recent riots. In the end $50,000,000 was lost due to cancelled conventions in the city and ended with various business deals in the city to help expand black owned businesses and attract black professionals.

=== 1991 Miami riot ===
After police shot a shooting suspect in Overtown, rioting broke out in majority black neighborhoods of Liberty City, Overtown, and to a lighter degree in Coconut Grove. Twenty people were arrested after rocks were thrown at a police station, a city bus, and a dumpster was set on fire.

== See also ==
- List of incidents of civil unrest in the United States
