= 1968 Republican National Convention =

Political convention of the Republican Party

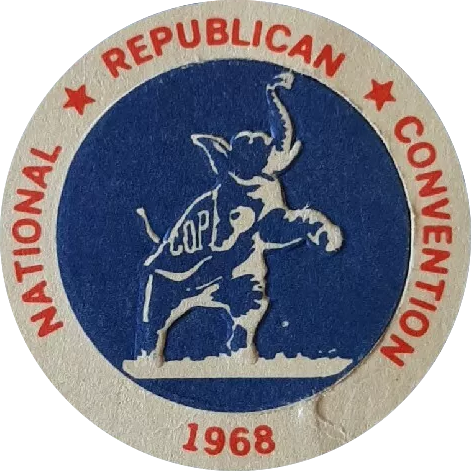
- 1968 presidential election

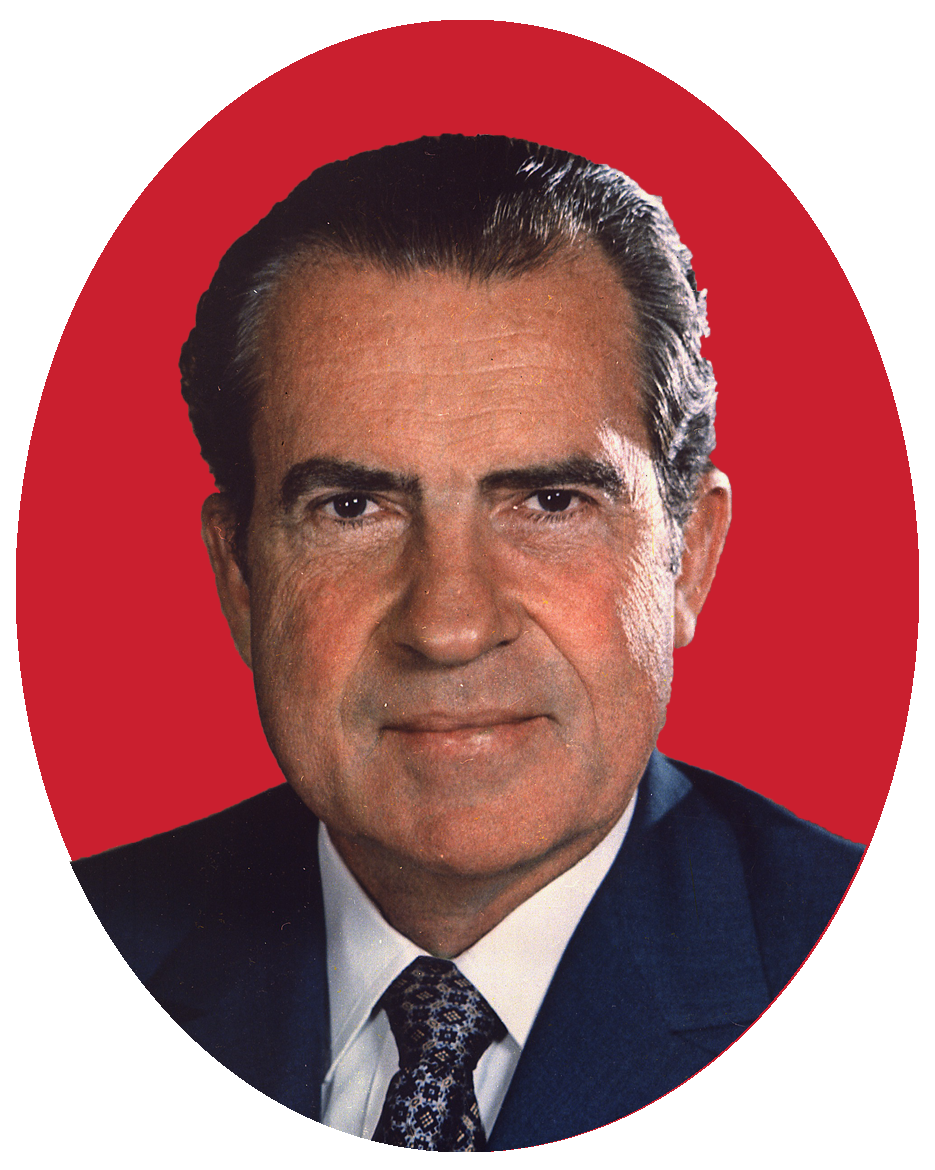
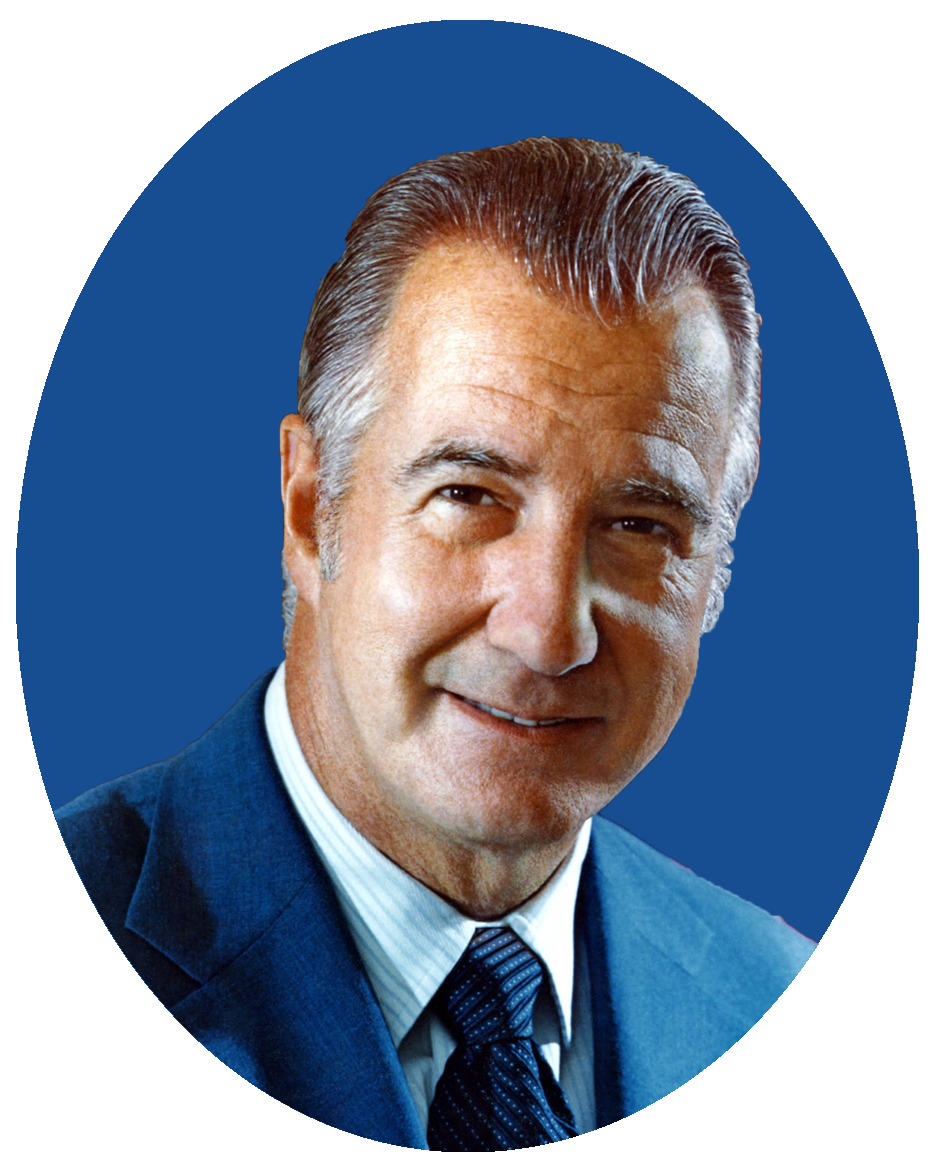
- Nominees; Nixon and Agnew

Convention
- Date(s): August 5–8, 1968
- City: Miami Beach, Florida
- Venue: Miami Beach Convention Center
- Keynote speaker: Daniel J. Evans

Candidates
- Presidential nominee: Richard Nixon of New York
- Vice-presidential nominee: Spiro Agnew of Maryland

Voting
- Total delegates: 1,333
- Votes needed for nomination: 667 (majority)
- Results (president): Nixon (NY): 1,238 (92.87%); Rockefeller (NY): 93 (6.98%); Reagan: (CA): 2 (0.15%)
- Results (vice president): Agnew (MD): 1,119 (83.95%); Romney (MI): 186 (13.95%); Lindsay (NY): 10 (0.75%); Others: 2 (0.15%); Not Voting: 16 (1.20%)

The 1968 Republican National Convention was held at the Miami Beach Convention Center in Miami Beach, Florida, USA, from August 5 to August 8, 1968, to select the party's nominee in the general election. It nominated former Vice President Richard Nixon for President of the United States and then Maryland Governor Spiro Agnew for vice president. It was the fourth time Nixon had been nominated on the Republican ticket as either its vice presidential (1952 United States presidential election and 1956 United States presidential election) or presidential candidate (1960 United States presidential election). Symbolic of the South's changing political affiliation, this was the first Republican National Convention held in a prior Confederate State.

== Political context ==
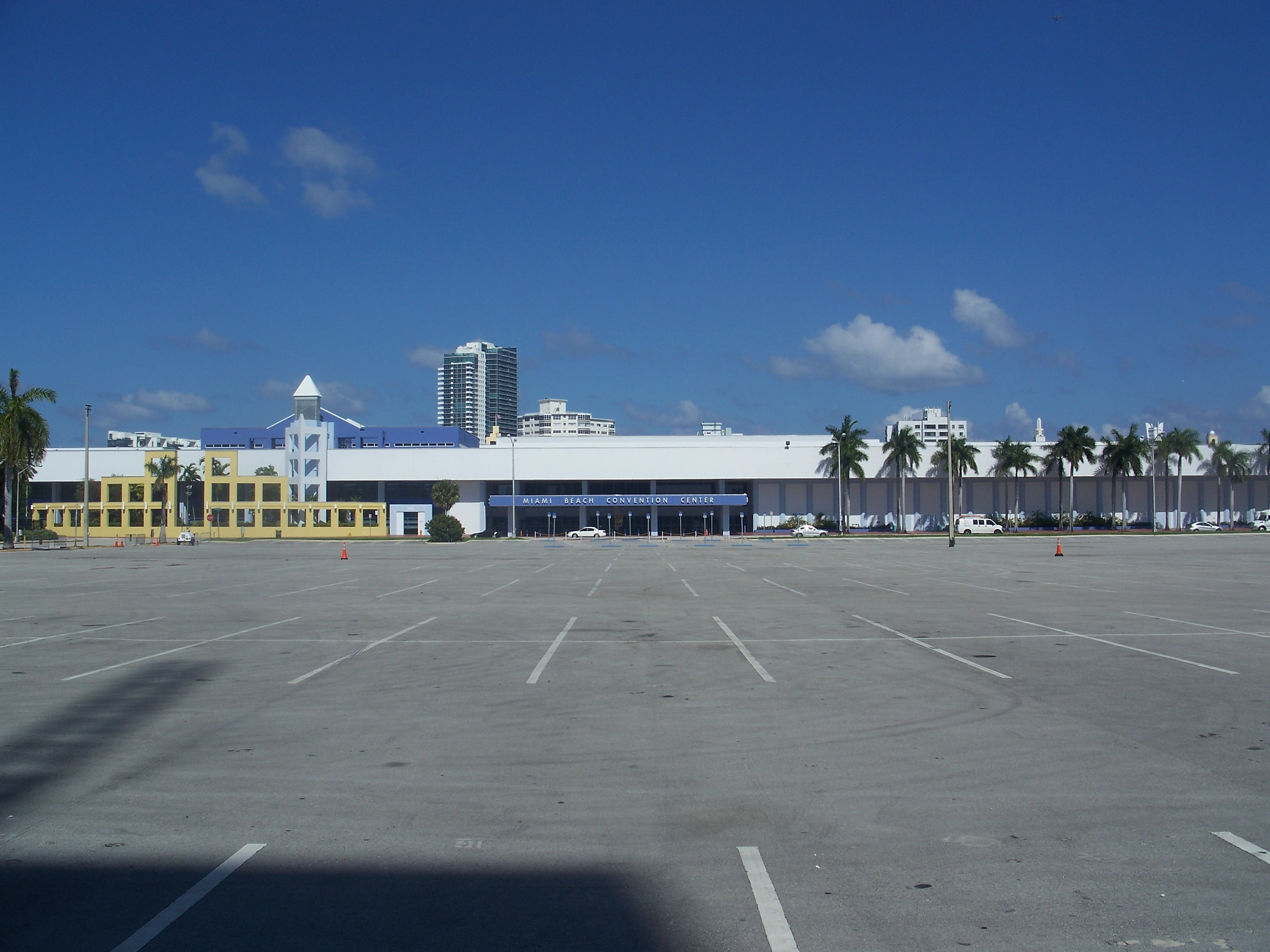
The Miami Beach Convention Center was the site of the 1968 Republican National Convention.

convention floor

Former Vice President Richard Nixon, emerged as the frontrunner again for the 1968 Republican presidential nomination. Nixon had been the Republican Party nominee in the 1960 presidential election, and lost to Democratic Party candidate John F. Kennedy.

The so-called "New Nixon" in the 1968 presidential election devised a "Southern strategy," taking advantage of the region's opposition to racial integration and other progressive/liberal policies of the Democratic Party and President Lyndon B. Johnson.

Nixon was nominated on the first ballot with 692 votes to 277 votes for Nelson Rockefeller, 182 votes for California Governor Ronald Reagan and the rest scattered. He was able to secure the nomination to the support of many Southern delegates, after he and his subordinates made concessions to Strom Thurmond and Harry Dent on civil rights, the Supreme Court, and the selection of a vice presidential candidate.

Nixon decided not to re-select his 1960 running mate Henry Cabot Lodge Jr., and House Minority Leader Gerald Ford of Michigan proposed New York City Mayor John Lindsay for vice president. Nixon turned instead to another perceived moderate, Maryland Governor Spiro Agnew. Agnew, former Baltimore County Executive in the Baltimore City suburbs (1963–1967), and since Governor of Maryland, had come to Republican leaders and Nixon's attention when he summoned several Black civic, religious, and political leaders in Baltimore to the local State Office Building complex, following the disastrous April 1968 riots which enveloped Black sections of East and West Baltimore in the wake of the assassination of Martin Luther King Jr. in Memphis, Tennessee. Agnew complained of the Black leaders' lack of support after a number of what he perceived to be positive projects, programs and support by his Republican administration for the minority communities in the city. Agnew's biting comments caused many in the audience to walk out. Agnew was seen as a candidate who could appeal to Rockefeller Republicans, was acceptable to Southern Conservatives, and had a solid law-and-order record.

In his acceptance speech, Nixon deplored the state of the union and urged a return to law and order both at home and abroad:

When the strongest nation in the world can be tied down for four years in Vietnam with no end in sight, when the richest nation in the world can't manage its own economy, when the nation with the greatest tradition of the rule of law is plagued by unprecedented racial violence, when the President of the United States cannot travel abroad or to any major city at home, then it's time for new leadership for the United States of America.

Nixon also said that he had "a good teacher", referring to Eisenhower, and made the delegates happy with the statement "Let's win this one for Ike!" Eisenhower was not present during Nixon's speech nor during any part of the convention. Due to failing health, he was under doctor's orders not to travel, but addressed the convention by telephone. He died the following March.

== Balloting ==
The following were placed into nomination:

=== Nominated for President ===
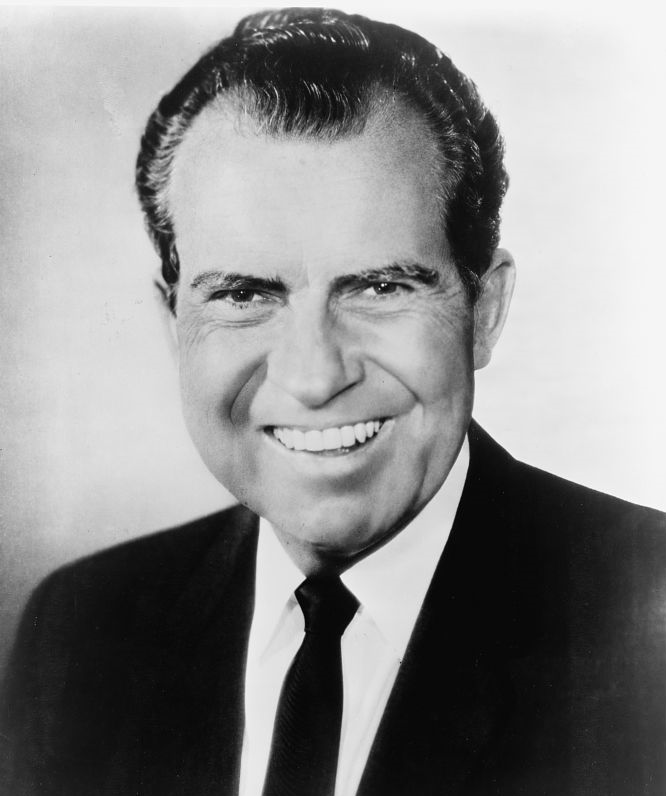
Former Vice President
Richard Nixon
of California

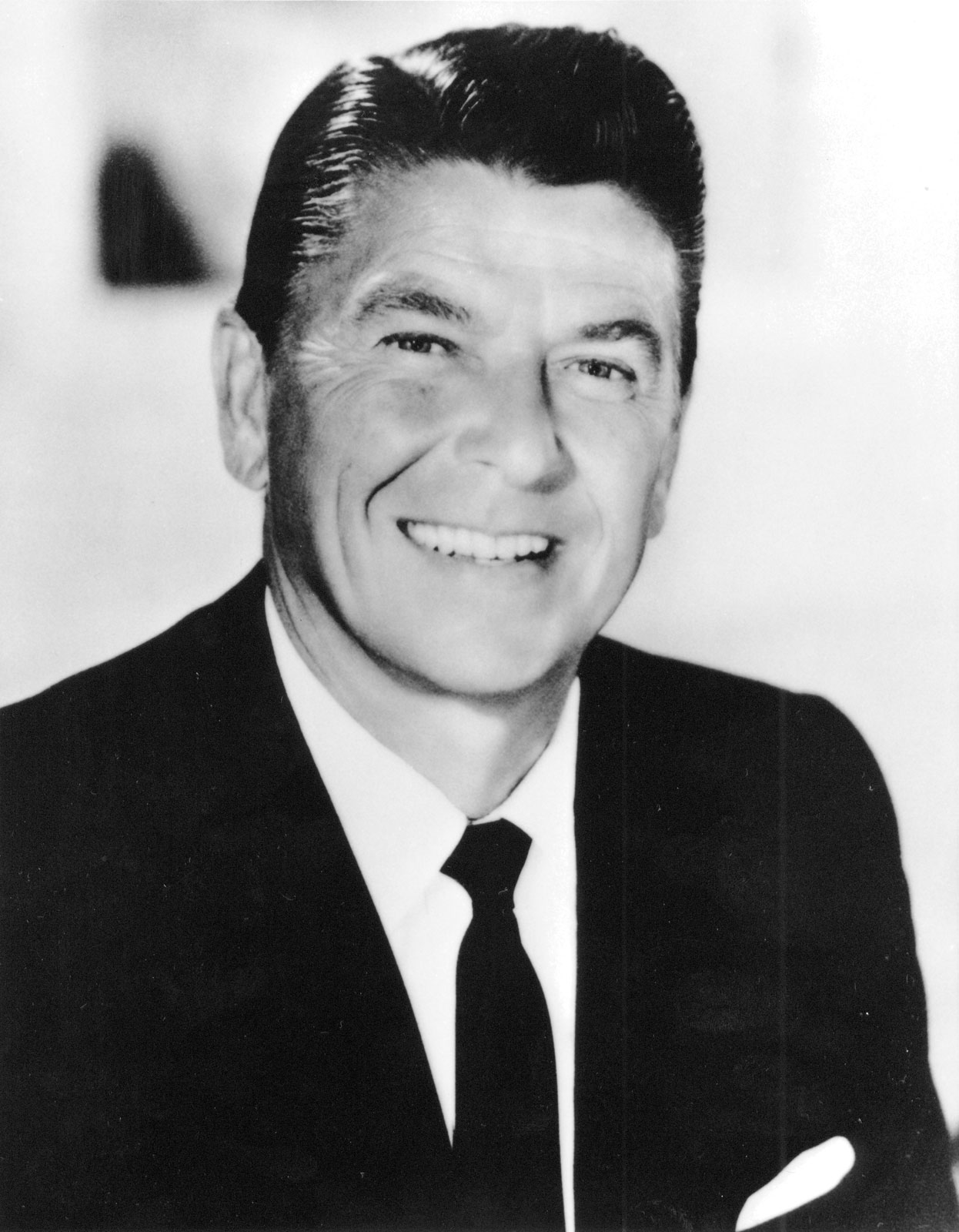
Governor
Ronald Reagan
of California

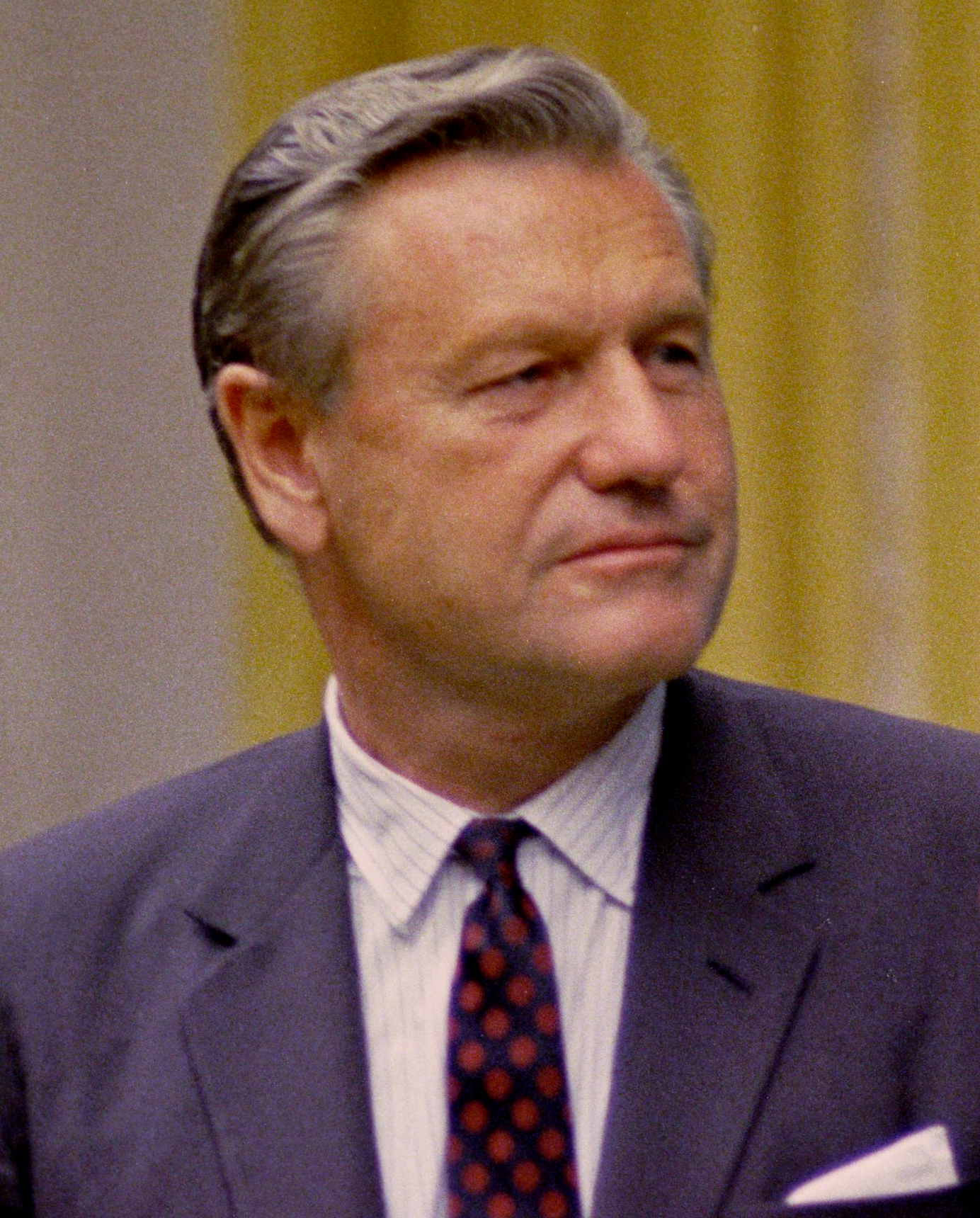
Governor
Nelson Rockefeller
of New York

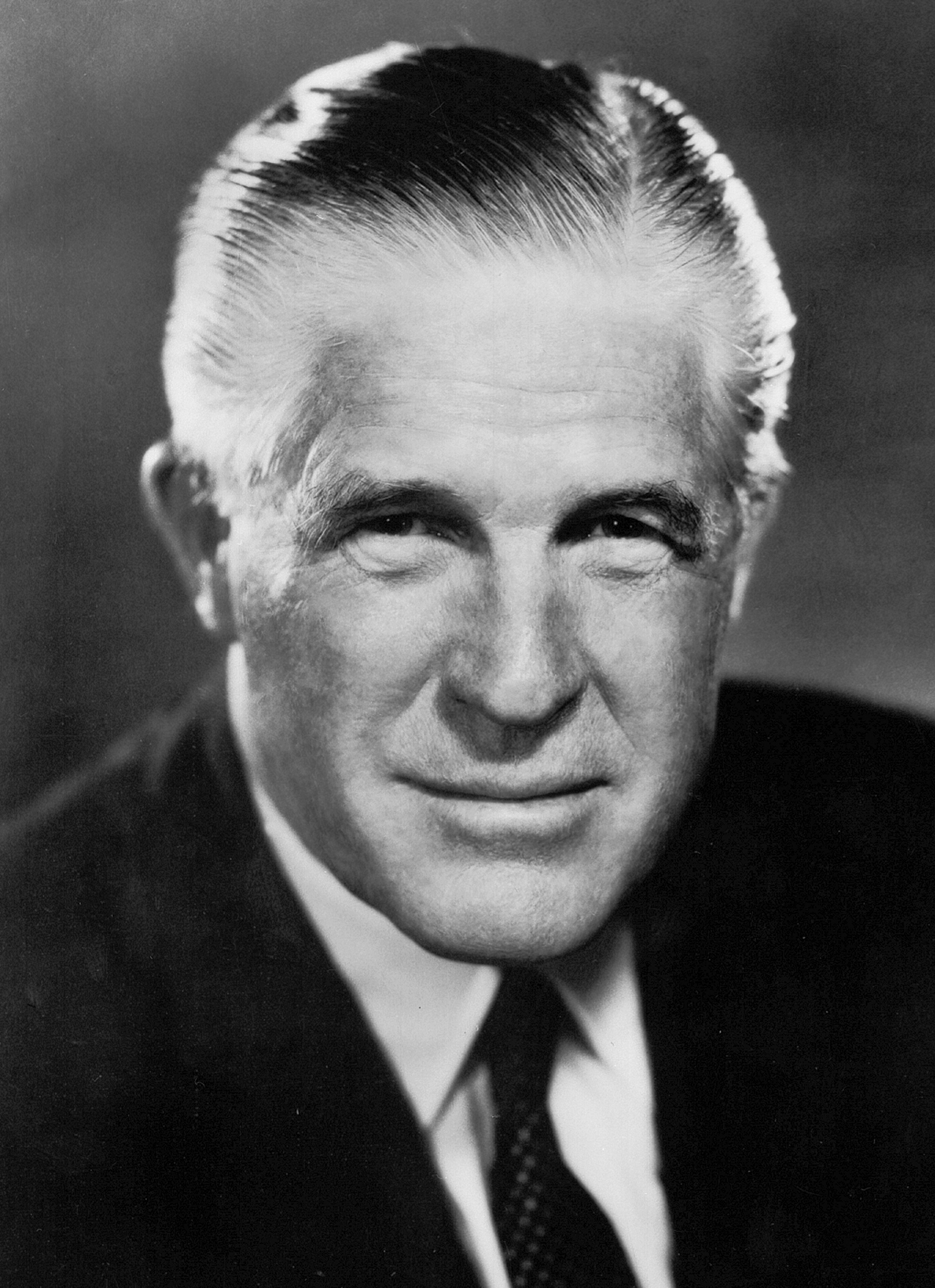
Governor
George Romney
of Michigan

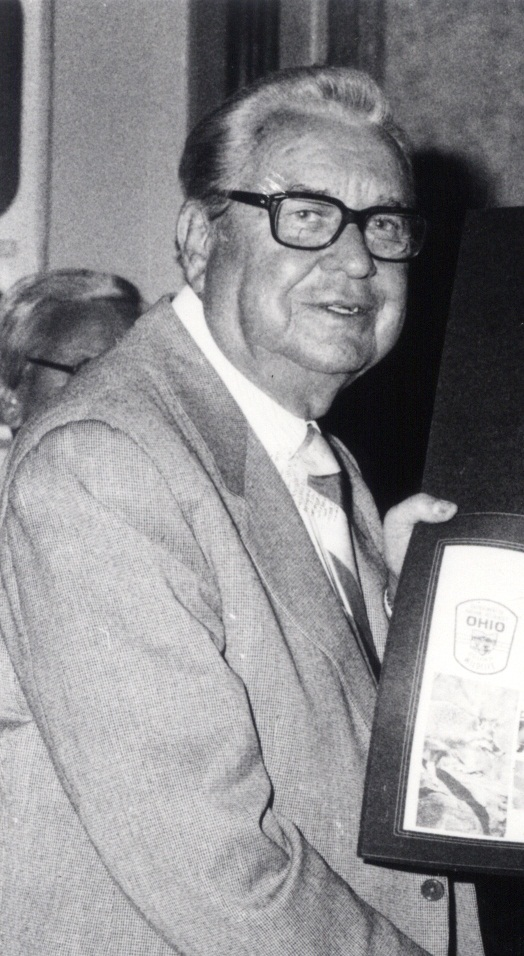
Governor
James A. Rhodes
of Ohio

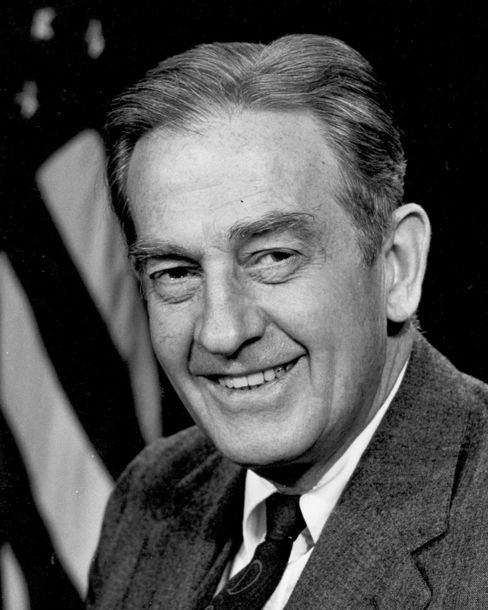
Senator
Clifford Case
of New Jersey

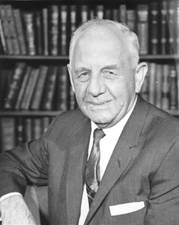
Senator
Frank Carlson
of Kansas

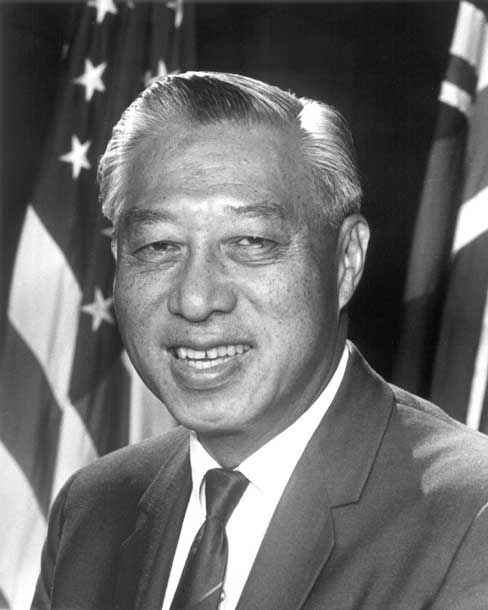
Senator
Hiram Fong
of Hawaii

=== Nominated for Vice President ===
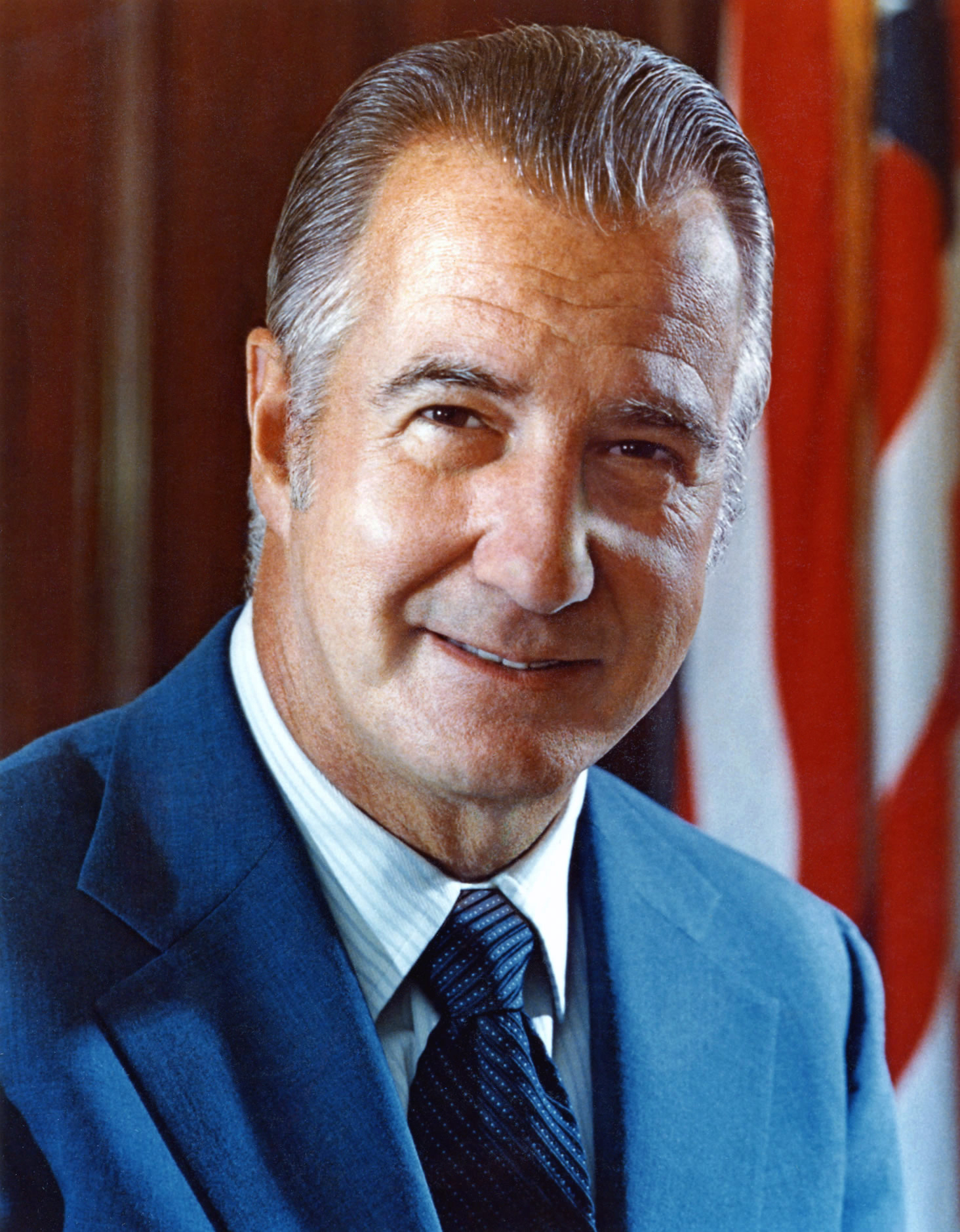
Governor
Spiro Agnew
of Maryland

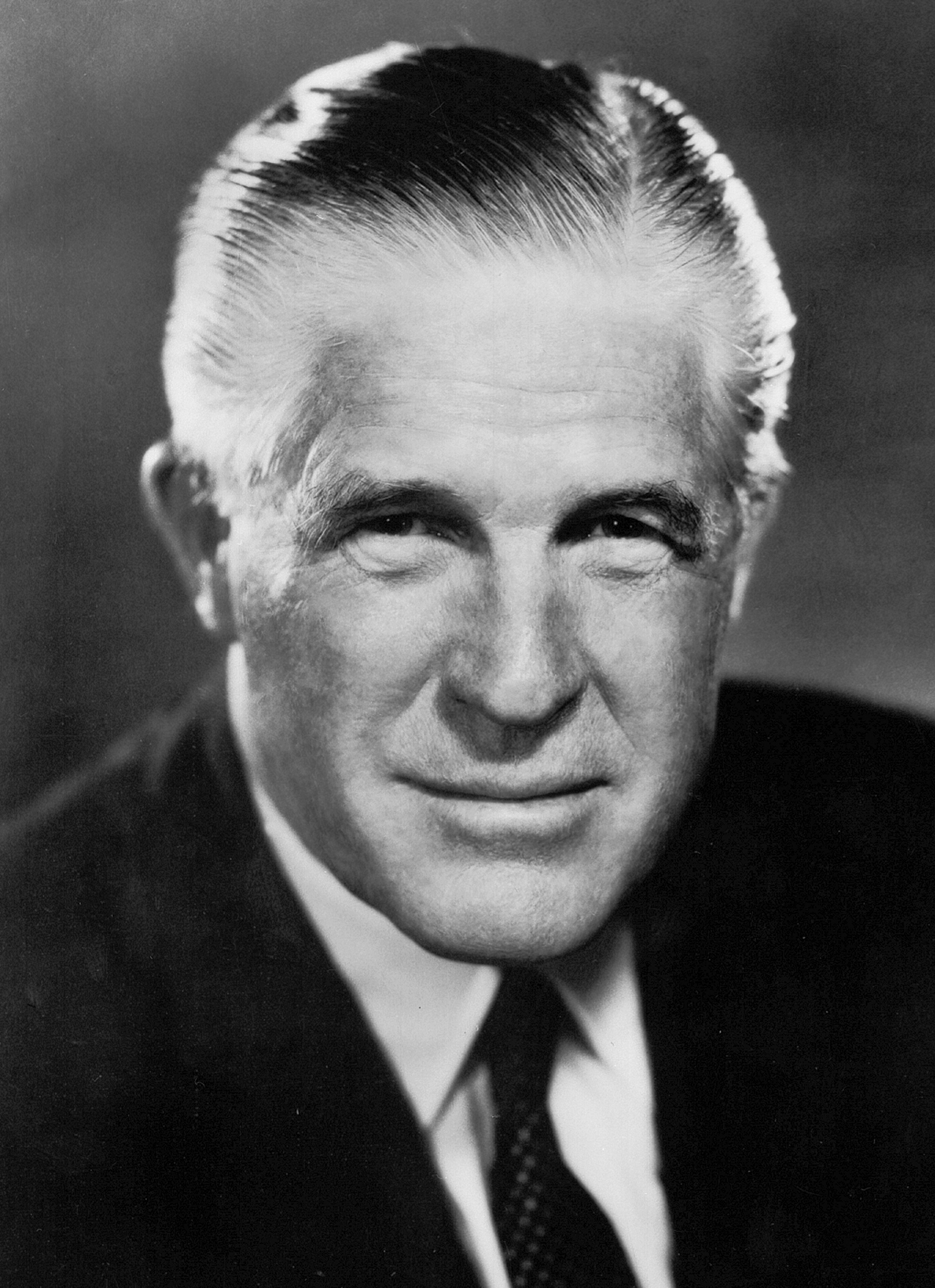
Governor
George Romney
of Michigan

=== The Republican Convention Tally results ===
This was the last time during the 20th Century that two siblings (the Rockefeller brothers) received votes at a convention.

The Republican Convention Tally
| President | (before switches) | (after switches) | Vice President | Vice-Presidential votes |
| Richard M. Nixon | 692 | 1238 | Spiro T. Agnew | 1119 |
| Nelson Rockefeller | 277 | 93 | George Romney | 186 |
| Ronald Reagan | 182 | 2 | John V. Lindsay | 10 |
| Ohio Governor James A. Rhodes | 55 | — | Massachusetts Senator Edward Brooke | 1 |
| Michigan Governor George Romney | 50 | — | James A. Rhodes | 1 |
| New Jersey Senator Clifford Case | 22 | — | Not Voting | 16 |
| Kansas Senator Frank Carlson | 20 | — | — | |
| Arkansas Governor Winthrop Rockefeller | 18 | — | — | |
| Hawaii Senator Hiram Fong | 14 | — | — | |
| Harold Stassen | 2 | — | — | |
| New York City Mayor John V. Lindsay | 1 | — | — | |

=== Results by state ===
Results of the convention by state Nixon Rockefeller Reagan Romney Various (Note: Favorite sons received support from Ohio (Jim Rhodes), Hawaii (Hiram Fong), New Jersey (Clifford Case), Kansas (Frank Carlson), and Arkansas (Winthrop Rockefeller).)

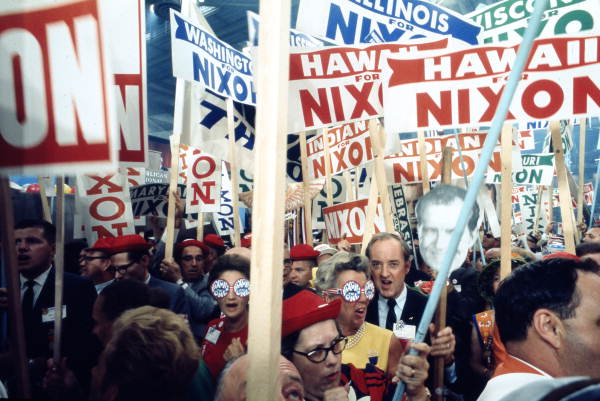
Nixon supporters at the convention

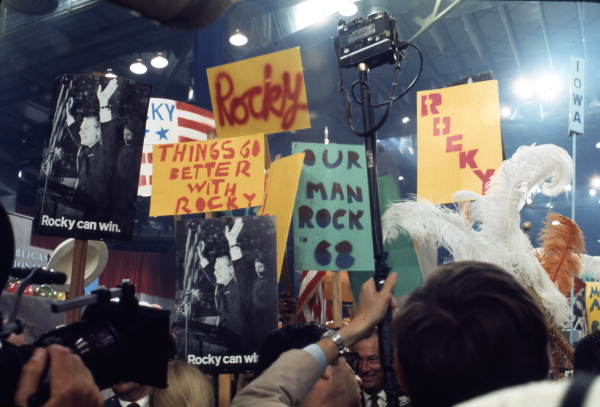
Rockefeller supporters at the convention

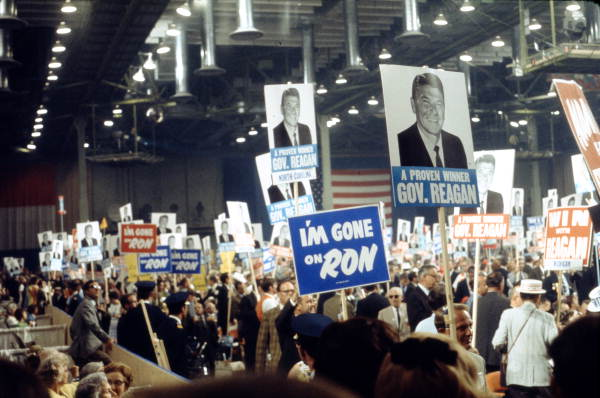
Reagan supporters at the convention

The balloting by state was as follows:

| State | Nixon | N. Rockefeller | Reagan | Rhodes | Romney | Case | Carlson | W. Rockefeller | Fong | Stassen | Lindsay |
| Alabama | 14 | | 12 | | | | | | | | |
| Alaska | 11 | 1 | | | | | | | | | |
| Arizona | 16 | | | | | | | | | | |
| Arkansas | | | | | | | | 18 | | | |
| California | | | 86 | | | | | | | | |
| Colorado | 14 | 3 | 1 | | | | | | | | |
| Connecticut | 4 | 12 | | | | | | | | | |
| Delaware | 9 | 3 | | | | | | | | | |
| Florida | 32 | 1 | 1 | | | | | | | | |
| Georgia | 21 | 2 | 7 | | | | | | | | |
| Hawaii | | | | | | | | | 14 | | |
| Idaho | 9 | | 5 | | | | | | | | |
| Illinois | 50 | 5 | 3 | | | | | | | | |
| Indiana | 26 | | | | | | | | | | |
| Iowa | 13 | 8 | 3 | | | | | | | | |
| Kansas | | | | | | | 20 | | | | |
| Kentucky | 22 | 2 | | | | | | | | | |
| Louisiana | 19 | | 7 | | | | | | | | |
| Maine | 7 | 7 | | | | | | | | | |
| Maryland | 18 | 8 | | | | | | | | | |
| Massachusetts | | 34 | | | | | | | | | |
| Michigan | 4 | | | | 44 | | | | | | |
| Minnesota | 9 | 15 | | | | | | | | 1 | 1 |
| Mississippi | 20 | | | | | | | | | | |
| Missouri | 16 | 5 | 3 | | | | | | | | |
| Montana | 11 | | 3 | | | | | | | | |
| Nebraska | 16 | | | | | | | | | | |
| Nevada | 9 | 3 | | | | | | | | | |
| New Hampshire | 8 | | | | | | | | | | |
| New Jersey | 18 | | | | | 22 | | | | | |
| New Mexico | 8 | 1 | 5 | | | | | | | | |
| New York | 4 | 88 | | | | | | | | | |
| North Carolina | 9 | 1 | 16 | | | | | | | | |
| North Dakota | 5 | 2 | 1 | | | | | | | | |
| Ohio | 2 | | | 55 | | | | | | 1 | |
| Oklahoma | 14 | 1 | 7 | | | | | | | | |
| Oregon | 18 | | | | | | | | | | |
| Pennsylvania | 22 | 41 | 1 | | | | | | | | |
| Rhode Island | | 14 | | | | | | | | | |
| South Carolina | 22 | | | | | | | | | | |
| South Dakota | 14 | | | | | | | | | | |
| Tennessee | 28 | | | | | | | | | | |
| Texas | 41 | | 15 | | | | | | | | |
| Utah | 2 | | | | 6 | | | | | | |
| Vermont | 9 | 3 | | | | | | | | | |
| Virginia | 22 | 2 | | | | | | | | | |
| Washington | 15 | 3 | 6 | | | | | | | | |
| West Virginia | 11 | 3 | | | | | | | | | |
| Wisconsin | 30 | | | | | | | | | | |
| Wyoming | 12 | | | | | | | | | | |
| District of Columbia | 6 | 3 | | | | | | | | | |
| Puerto Rico | | 5 | | | | | | | | | |
| U.S. Virgin Islands | 2 | 1 | | | | | | | | | |
| Total | 692 | 277 | 182 | 55 | 50 | 22 | 20 | 18 | 14 | 2 | 1 |

== See also ==
- History of the United States Republican Party
- List of Republican National Conventions
- United States presidential nominating convention
- 1968 Democratic National Convention
- 1968 United States presidential election
- Richard Nixon 1968 presidential campaign
- 1968 Miami riot

== Bibliography ==
- Troy, Gil; Schlesinger, Arthur M.; Israel, Fred L. (2012). History of American Presidential Elections, 1789–2008. Vol. 3 (4 ed.). New York City: Facts on File. ISBN 978-0-8160-8220-9.

| Preceded by 1964; Daly City, California | Republican National Conventions | Succeeded by 1972; Miami Beach, Florida |
