= Michael Jones-Correa =

Michael Jones-Correa (born 1965) is President's Distinguished Professor of political science at the University of Pennsylvania. His research centers on the topics of immigrant political incorporation and ethnic and racial relations in the United States, often writing about political behavior in the context of institutional structures.

Jones-Correa graduated with a B.A. in political science from Rice University in 1987. He earned his Ph.D. in politics from Princeton University in 1994. Jones-Correa taught at Harvard University from 1994 to 2001 and at Cornell University from 2001-2016, where he served as the Robert J. Katz Chair of the Department of Government from 2014-2016. At the University of Pennsylvania, he is President's Distinguished Professor of Political Science and was the founding director of the Center for the Study of Race, Ethnicity and Immigration from 2016-2021.

== Select publications ==
- Holding Fast: Latino Immigrant Civic Engagement and Resilience in Polarizing Times (Russell Sage 2020)
- Outsiders No More? Models of Immigrant Political Incorporation (Oxford 2013)
- Latinos in the New Millennium (Cambridge, 2012)
- Latino Lives in America: Making It Home (Temple, 2010)
- Governing American Cities: Inter-Ethnic Coalitions, Competition and Conflict (Russell Sage Foundation, 2001)
- Between Two Nations: The Political Predicament of Latinos in New York City (Cornell, 1998)
