= 1980 Miami riots =

Period of civil unrest in Miami, Florida

- Part of Race riots in Miami
- Date: May 17–20, 1980 (3 days)
- Location: Dade County, Florida: Miami; West Coconut Grove; Brownsville; Liberty City; Overtown
- Caused by: Acquittal of officers who beat Arthur McDuffie to death
- Methods: Riots, looting, arson, sniping, murder

Parties
Rioters	Florida Army National Guard; Dade County Public Safety Department

Lead figures
No centralized leadership	Bob Graham; Maurice Ferré

Casualties
- Deaths: 18
- Injuries: 350
- Arrested: 600

The 1980 Miami riots (also called the Arthur McDuffie riots) were race riots that occurred in Miami, Florida, United States, starting in earnest on May 18, 1980, following an all-White male jury acquitting five white Dade County Public Safety Department officers in the death of Arthur McDuffie (December 3, 1946 – December 21, 1979), a Black insurance salesman and United States Marine Corps lance corporal. McDuffie was beaten to death by four police officers after a traffic stop. After the officers were tried and acquitted on charges including manslaughter and evidence tampering, a riot broke out in the Black neighborhoods of Overtown and Liberty City on the night of May 17. Riots continued until May 20, resulting in at least 18 deaths and an estimated $100 million in property damage.

In 1981 Dade County settled a civil lawsuit filed by McDuffie's family for $1.1 million. The 1980 Miami riots were the deadliest urban riots in a single city since the 1967 Detroit riot and remained such until the 1992 Los Angeles riots twelve years later.

== Background ==
=== Death of Arthur McDuffie ===
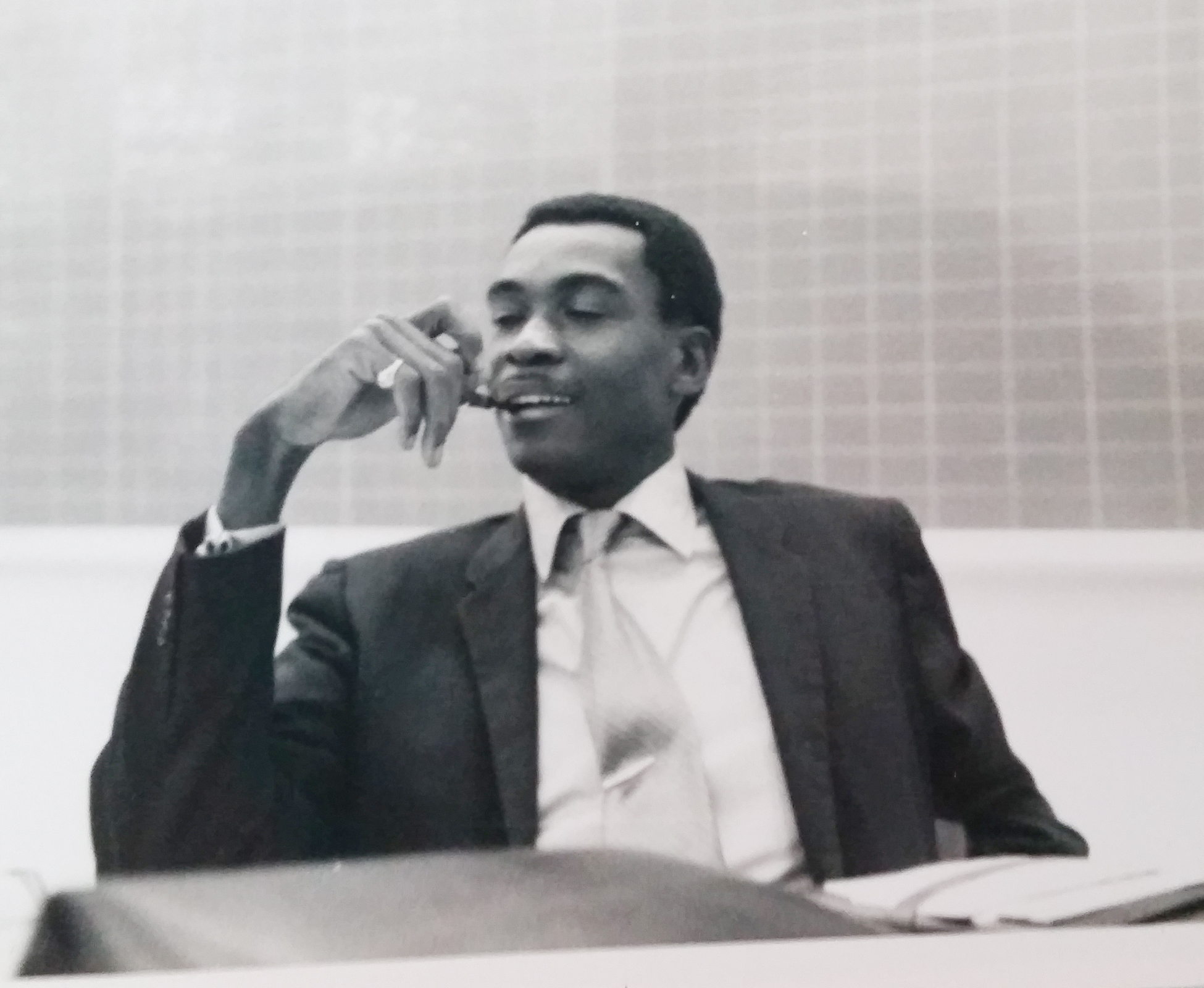
Arthur McDuffie (1979)

In the early morning hours of December 17, 1979, a group of six White police officers stopped thirty-three-year-old McDuffie, who was riding a black-and-orange 1973 Kawasaki Z1 motorcycle. McDuffie had accumulated traffic citations and was riding with a suspended license. According to the initial police report, he had led police on an eight-minute high-speed chase through residential streets at speeds of over 80 miles per hour (130 km/h).

In that initial report, four of the officers involved in the chase (Note: Sgt. Ira Diggs and Officers William Hanlon, Michael Watts, and Alex Marrero) claimed McDuffie had run a red light or stop sign and subsequently led police on an eight-minute chase. Sgt. Herbert Evans (who was not at the scene) added that McDuffie lost control of his motorcycle while making a left turn and, according to Officer Charles Veverka, McDuffie subsequently struck his head on the ground, after which he attempted to flee on foot. The officers caught him and a scuffle ensued in which McDuffie allegedly kicked Sgt. Ira Diggs, who wrote "the subject was observed to be fighting violently." Police drove a squad car over the motorbike to make the incident look like an accident.

McDuffie was transported to a nearby hospital where he died four days later of his injuries. McDuffie's ex-wife, who was planning to re-marry him on February 7, 1980, was on duty as a nurse's aide when he was transported to Jackson Memorial Hospital. The coroner's report concluded that he had suffered multiple skull fractures, one of which was 10 inches (250 mm) long.

The medical examiner, Dr. Ronald Wright, said McDuffie's injuries were not consistent with a motorcycle crash, and that if McDuffie had fallen off the motorcycle, as the police claimed, it did not make sense that its gauges would be broken. Wright said that it seemed that he had been beaten to death.

=== Frank investigation ===
"In the process of arresting and handcuffing him, McDuffie's helmet was removed and he was thrown to the ground. Officers Ira Diggs, Michael Watts, William Hanlon and Alex Marrero proceeded to strike McDuffie in and around the head and chest with flashlights and nightsticks no less than five times.
"During this time, the defendants used their flashlights and nightsticks to repeatedly strike the motorcycle upon which McDuffie had been riding and which, at the time he was initially apprehended, was undamaged.
"At the instructions of Sergeant Herb Evans, the defendants subsequently reported that the injuries to McDuffie and damage to his motorcycle were the result of a motorcycle accident. There was no accident."

— Capt. Marshall Frank, Metropolitan Dade County Department of Public Safety, Sworn affidavit, quoted in The New York Times (1979)

Officer Veverka made a sworn statement on December 26 that he had lied in the initial report. According to Veverka's statement, after McDuffie stopped, Veverka pulled him off his motorcycle, and McDuffie responded by taking a swing at Veverka. More officers arrived shortly afterward and, according to Veverka, "six to eight" of them began beating McDuffie with nightsticks and heavy Kel-Lite flashlights. Veverka said he tried to pull McDuffie out of the fracas, but was unable to. Captain Marshall Frank investigated the cover-up, and made a sworn affidavit which led to criminal charges against four officers.

Officer William Hanlon later testified that he had choked McDuffie to the ground with his nightstick before he managed to handcuff McDuffie. Hanlon testified that after McDuffie was restrained, Officer Alex Marrero struck McDuffie on the head with Marrero's Kel-Lite "at least three times. It was very strong and very powerful blows. His entire face was covered with blood." Hanlon added he was the officer who had driven over McDuffie's motorcycle; Hanlon also gouged the pavement with a tire iron to simulate skid marks and threw McDuffie's watch into the gutter. A patrol car had been used to deliberately run over the motorcycle to break its gauges and make it seem that McDuffie crashed.

Officer Mark Meier testified the high-speed chase had slowed to 25 miles per hour when McDuffie shouted, "I give up" and stopped. Meier said that between three and eight officers then surrounded McDuffie, pulled off his helmet and proceeded to beat him with nightsticks. He said that the officer struck him at least twice.

By the end of the struggle, the officers had, in the words of medical examiner Dr. Ronald Wright, cracked McDuffie's skull "like an egg" using "long, heavy blunt objects. This was a melee."

=== Trial ===
The acting director of the Dade County Public Safety Department, Bobby Jones, suspended three officers on December 27. Diggs, Hanlon, Marrero, and Watts were charged with manslaughter and tampering with physical evidence on December 28; Evans was charged with being an accessory after the fact, and four other officers were suspended with pay. Marrero was charged with second-degree murder on February 1, 1980. Jones said that since 1973, the four accused of manslaughter had been cited in 47 citizen complaints and 13 internal affairs probes. Ubaldo Del Toro later was charged with being an accessory to the crime, as well as fabricating evidence; neither Evans nor Del Toro were involved in the stop. Another officer was charged with tampering with evidence. The eight officers involved were all dismissed from the force and five of them would go on to stand trial in March 1980 on various charges:

- Ira Diggs (manslaughter, aggravated battery, tampering with evidence, being an accessory after the fact)
- Herbert Evans (tampering with evidence and being an accessory after the fact)
- William Hanlon (granted immunity for his testimony)
- Alex Marrero (second-degree murder and aggravated battery)
- Mark Meier (granted immunity for his testimony)
- Ubaldo Del Toro (tampering with evidence and being an accessory after the fact)
- Charles Veverka (granted immunity for his testimony)
- Michael Watts (manslaughter and aggravated battery)

Because of the volatile atmosphere in Miami, which presiding judge Lenore Carrero Nesbitt had termed a "time bomb," the trial was shifted to Tampa. Jury selection began on March 31, 1980. The lead prosecutor of the case was Janet Reno, later U.S. Attorney General during the Clinton presidency.

The defense said that the police were violently attacked by McDuffie, an ex-Marine they called a karate expert, and that only "necessary force" was used to subdue him. The chief assistant state attorney disagreed: "Somebody beat this man's brains in." The defense also attacked the credibility of the three witnesses (Veverka, Meier, and Hanlon) who had been granted immunity in exchange for their testimony. In her instructions to the jury, Judge Nesbitt said, "a witness who realizes he must procure his own freedom by incriminating others has a motive to falsify." The three men who gave sworn statements were Veverka, Hanlon, and Meier. Hanlon was the only defendant to take the stand. After their testimony, Marerro was given a new charge of second-degree murder. Hanlon was charged with felonies, while Veverka was charged with a civil rights violation, but was acquitted.

On April 25, officer Mark Meier was given immunity.

On May 8, Del Toro was acquitted on a directed verdict after the prosecution rested. Judge Nesbitt said the state had failed to prove its case. Nine days later, the all-White six-man jury acquitted the remaining officers on all counts of the indictment after less than three hours of deliberation because of inconsistent witness testimony. One juror called McDuffie's death "a tragedy" but felt "the Dade County Public Safety Department and the state attorney's office were in such a hurry to appease everybody they blew [their case]."

== Riots ==
The May 17 verdict resulted in protests in the Miami streets that night; approximately 5,000 people attended a protest at the Downtown Miami Metro Justice Building. By 6:00 p.m. that night, the protest had turned into a riot. While driving home after a day of fishing, three white men (Note: Benny Higdon, 21; Higdon's brother-in-law Robert Owens, 15; and Owens's friend Charles Barreca, 15.) were dragged from their car and beaten to death in northwestern Miami. A butcher (Note: Amelio Munoz, 66) driving home from work that night was ambushed by a stone-throwing mob; he drove into a wall while trying to get away, and the crowd set his car on fire, burning him to death inside it. In other incidents that night, at least 23 were injured, some critically. The driver of a car with three white people (Note: Driver Michael Kulp, 18; his brother Jeffrey, 22, who later died; and Jeffrey's girlfriend Debra Gettman, 23.) lost control after it was surrounded and stoned; after the car struck and injured two black pedestrians, (Note: Shanreka Perry, 11; Albert Nelson, 75) the occupants were pulled out and beaten, and one of the men in the car would die from his injuries 26 days later.

Florida governor Bob Graham ordered 500 National Guard troops into the area; despite his doubling their number the next day, the riot continued. Twelve more people were killed and 165 injured as violence spread to the Black Grove, Overtown, Liberty City, and Brownsville sections of the city. In one incident, a black man (Note: Lugene Brown, 38) who had driven to a convenience store was shot in the chest with a shotgun from a passing pickup truck while his family watched. In addition, fires, burglaries, and looting increased, with police reluctant to enter some areas for fear of sniper fire.

By the third day, the violence declined as the city imposed a curfew from 8:00 p.m. to 6:00 a.m., coupled with a temporary ban on the sale of firearms and liquor. Governor Graham sent in 2,500 National Guardsmen in addition to the 1,000 already in the city.

Local police barricaded parts of Coconut Grove to warn motorists away from the area, as drivers had reported having rocks thrown at them. The city came to a standstill. Reports of sniper fire at freeway drivers also stopped traffic until the military could restore order.

In total, 18 people were killed over the three days of rioting, while 370 people, some of them children, were hurt and 787 were arrested. Property destruction exceeded $100 million.

=== Analysis ===
On the one-year anniversary of the riots, Florida International University professor Marvin Dunn and journalism instructor Bruce Porter released The Miami Riot of 1980, a report which concluded that unlike prior riots in 1967 and 1968, the "one purpose [of the riot was] beating and killing whites." The demographics of those arrested for rioting were different, as well; the majority of those arrested in Miami were "not poor or unemployed or members of the criminal class." In addition, the authors observed that "Blacks in Miami seemed willing to give the criminal justice system an opportunity to apply itself"; in previous riots, the delay between an unjust killing and the riot was usually hours or days, much shorter than the five-month gap between McDuffie's death (December 1979) and the riots (May 1980).

== Aftermath ==
The federal government declared Miami a disaster area, and authorized the release of funds to allow the city to rebuild. The Miami Fraternal Order of Police had threatened a walkout unless the officers were reinstated. The following day, the five officers who had been acquitted were reinstated in their jobs.

=== Civil rights trial ===
Days after the verdict, the U.S. Justice Department said it would seek indictments of the policemen for federal civil rights violations. On July 28, 1980, a federal grand jury indicted Charles Veverka, despite his having received immunity from the original charges filed by the state during the first trial.

The federal trial was held in San Antonio, Texas. It had been moved initially from Miami to Atlanta, and then to New Orleans; each city asked that it be moved from their venues due to its controversial racial aspects. Journalists referred to the case as "The Trial That Nobody Wants."

On December 17, Veverka was acquitted in the week-long trial after the jury deliberated for more than 16 hours. The jury foreman cited Veverka's voluntary sworn statement contradicting initial police reports as the biggest factor in the acquittal. Minor incidents of violence were reported in Miami after the verdict was announced. Veverka's attorney, Denis Dean predicted that no further indictments would be forthcoming from the case and none were issued.

=== Further legal developments ===
In 1982, Ira Lee Pickett was convicted of second murder, arson, and burglary for burning alive a Cuban man, Emilio Munoz, during the riots. He was sentenced to two consecutive life terms plus 30 years and remains in prison to this day. An accomplice who testified against Pickett, Jasper Ferguson, received two 20-year sentences for his role in Munoz's murder and another person.

In 1980, an 18-year-old black man, James McCullough, was convicted of manslaughter and attempted murder in the slaying of Jeffrey Kulp and attack on his brother. McCullough was sentenced to 30 years in prison, later reduced to four years in prison and two years of "community control." A codefendant was acquitted.

Four young black men and teenage boys, 20-year-old Leonard Capers, his brother 25-year-old Lawrence Capers, 17-year-old Samuel Lightsey, and 17-year-old Patrick Moore, were charged with first degree murder in the deaths of Benny Higdon, Robert Owens, and Charles Barreca. On February 6, 1981, Lightsey was convicted of three counts of second degree murder, the Capers brothers were both convicted of three counts of third degree murder, and Moore was acquitted. Lightsey received three consecutive life sentences and the Capers brothers were each sentenced to 45 years in prison. Lightsey remains in prison to this day, while the Capers brothers were both released from prison in the mid-1990s.

In 1982, Nathaniel Lane, who was accused of being the ringleader of the attacks on the Kulps, Higdon, Owens, and Barreca, was charged with shooting a black teenager in the neck, paralyzing him as a result, during a robbery. In 1983, he was convicted of attempted first degree murder and armed robbery and received two consecutive life terms. Lane died in prison on November 30, 2016, at the age of 55.

On November 17, 1981, Dade County commissioners agreed to a $1.1 million settlement with McDuffie's family in exchange for their dropping a $25 million civil lawsuit against the county. Of that amount, the family's legal team received $483,833, while McDuffie's two children each received $202,500, and his mother, $67,500.

=== Ex-officers ===
Herbert Evans earned a master's degree from the University of Miami and stated he may apply to law school.

In the immediate aftermath of the trial, William Hanlon worked part-time as a chauffeur and real estate agent. On April 20, 2006, Hanlon, who had trained as a lawyer, was permanently denied admittance to the bar by Florida's state Supreme Court.

Alex Marrero's wife petitioned for divorce the day after the acquittal. Marrero became a private detective, and was later indicted for conspiracy to distribute cocaine and commit bribery in 1989.

Mark Meier worked as the office manager for Century Electric Alarm Systems (Miami) and then as a security guard.

Eric Seymen was never charged criminally, but was dismissed from the police for complicity with the cover-up.

Charles Veverka resumed his job as a security guard after his December 1980 acquittal on the charges he had violated McDuffie's civil rights.

On May 22, 1980, Michael Watts was rushed to the hospital after attempting to commit suicide by breathing carbon monoxide. The police said that his attempt was related to a romantic breakup and not his trial.

== See also ==
- Race riots in Miami
- 1968 Miami riot
- 1989 Miami riot
- 1992 Los Angeles Riots
- List of killings by law enforcement officers in the United States
- Mass racial violence in the United States
- List of incidents of civil unrest in the United States
