= Mass racial violence in the United States =

In the broader context of racism in the United States, mass racial violence in the United States consists of ethnic conflicts and race riots, along with such events as:

- Racially based targeted attacks against African Americans by White Americans which took place before the American Civil War, often in relation to attempted slave revolts, and racially based attacks against African Americans by White Americans which took place after the war, in relation to tensions which existed during the Reconstruction and later efforts to suppress Black suffrage and institute Jim Crow laws
- Conflicts between Protestants and Catholic immigrants from Ireland and Prussia in the 19th century
- White American mobs frequently targeted Asian American immigrants during the 19th and 20th centuries
- Attacks on Native Americans and American pioneers which took place during conflicts over land ownership (see also: Native American genocide in the United States, American Indian Wars, list of Indian massacres in North America)
- Frequent fighting among members of various ethnic groups in major cities, specifically in the Northeastern and Midwestern United States throughout the late 19th and early 20th centuries, such as the ethnic violence between Puerto Ricans and Italian Americans in New York City
- Anti-immigrant violence, specifically anti-Catholic violence which targeted Catholics in the 19th century
- Anti-immigrant violence, specifically which targeted Latin Americans during the 20th century
- Two concurrent but distinct patterns of disturbances which occurred during the civil rights movement:
  - White-on-Black racial disturbances which occurred during demonstrations and protests, such as at the Marquette Park Illinois march of August 1966 and during the 1969 Greensboro uprising in North Carolina;
  - African American ghetto riots (1964–1969), including riots during the long, hot summer of 1967 and the King assassination riots of 1968, which caused deaths and injuries, looting, and long-lasting damage in African American communities.

== History ==
=== Racial and ethnic cleansing ===
Racial and ethnic cleansing was committed on a large scale both prior to and after the end of the American revolution during the early period of time in the history of the United States, particularly against American Indians, who were forced off their lands and relocated to reservations. Some historians might argue that the earliest Jamestown settlement and displacement of the Powhatan natives was the first incident of mass racial and indigenous violence as early as the 1620s. In US history, along with these events, Chinese Americans in the Pacific Northwest and African Americans throughout the United States (particularly in the American south) were rounded up and expunged from towns under threat of mob rule, the white mobs frequently intended to harm their African American targets.

=== Genocide of California's Indigenous peoples ===
Following California's transition to statehood, the California state government, incited, aided and financed miners, settlers, ranchers and people's militias to enslave, kidnap, or murder a major proportion of California's Indigenous people, who were sometimes contemptuously referred to as "Diggers", for their practice of digging up roots to eat. California governor Peter Hardeman Burnett predicted in 1851: "That a war of extermination will continue to be waged between the two races until the Indian race becomes extinct, must be expected. While we cannot anticipate the result with but painful regret, the inevitable destiny of the race is beyond the power and wisdom of man to avert."

California state forces, private militias, Federal reservations, and sections of the US Army all participated in the campaign that caused the deaths of many California Indians with the state and federal governments paying millions of dollars to militias to murder Indians, while many starved on Federal Reservations because of their caloric distribution reducing from 480–910 to 160–390 and between 1,680 and 3,741 California Indians were killed by the U.S. Army themselves. Between 1850 and 1852 the state appropriated almost one million dollars for the activities of militias, and between 1854 and 1859 the state appropriated another $500,000, almost half of which was reimbursed by the federal government. Guenter Lewy, famous for the phrase "In the end, the sad fate of America's Indians represents not a crime but a tragedy, involving an irreconcilable collision of cultures and values" wrote that what happened in California may constitute genocide: "some of the massacres in California, where both the perpetrators and their supporters openly acknowledged a desire to destroy the Indians as an ethnic entity, might indeed be regarded under the terms of the convention as exhibiting genocidal intent."

By one estimate, at least 4,500 California Indians were killed between 1849 and 1870. Contemporary historian Benjamin Madley has documented the numbers of California Indians killed between 1846 and 1873; he estimates that during this period at least 9,400 to 16,000 California Indians were killed by non-Indians. Most of the deaths took place in what he defined as more than 370 massacres (defined as the "intentional killing of five or more disarmed combatants or largely unarmed noncombatants, including women, children, and prisoners, whether in the context of a battle or otherwise"). Professor Ed Castillo, of Sonoma State University, estimates that more were killed: "The handiwork of these well armed death squads combined with the widespread random killing of Indians by individual miners resulted in the death of 100,000 Indians in the first two years of the gold rush."

Numerous books have been written on the subject of the California Indian genocide, such as Genocide and Vendetta: The Round Valley Wars in Northern California by Lynwood Carranco and Estle Beard, Murder State: California's Native American Genocide, 1846–1873 by Brendan C. Lindsay, and An American Genocide: The United States and the California Indian Catastrophe, 1846–1873 by Benjamin Madley among others. Madley's book caused California governor Jerry Brown to recognize the genocide. In a speech before representatives of Native American peoples in June, 2019, California governor Gavin Newsom apologized for the genocide. Newsom said, "That's what it was, a genocide. No other way to describe it. And that's the way it needs to be described in the history books."

=== Anti-immigrant violence ===
Riots which are defined by "race" have taken place between ethnic groups in the United States since at least the 18th century and they may have also occurred before it. During the early-to-mid- 19th centuries, violent rioting occurred between Protestant "Nativists" and recently arrived Irish Catholic immigrants.

The San Francisco Vigilance Movements of 1851 and 1856 have been described as responses to rampant crime and government corruption. But, since the late 19th century, historians have noted that the vigilantes had a nativist bias; they systematically attacked Irish immigrants, and later, they attacked Mexicans and Chileans who came as miners during the California Gold Rush, as well as Chinese immigrants. During the early 20th century, whites committed acts of racial or ethnic violence against Filipinos, Japanese, and Armenians, all of whom had arrived in California during waves of immigration.

During the late 19th and early 20th centuries, Italian immigrants were subjected to racial violence. In 1891, eleven Italians were lynched by a mob of thousands in New Orleans. In the 1890s, a total of twenty Italians were lynched in the South.

=== Late Civil War and Reconstruction era (1863–1877) ===
As the American Civil War ended, antislavery political forces demanded rights for ex-slaves. This led to the passage of the 14th and 15th amendments, which theoretically granted African-American and other minority males equality and voting rights. Although the federal government originally stationed troops in the South in order to protect these new freedoms, this time of progress was cut short.

By 1877, the North had lost its political will in the South and while slavery was gone, Jim Crow laws erased most of the freedoms which were guaranteed by the 14th and 15th amendments. Through violent economic tactics and legal technicalities, were gradually removed from the voting process.

=== Lynching era and race riots (1878–1939) ===
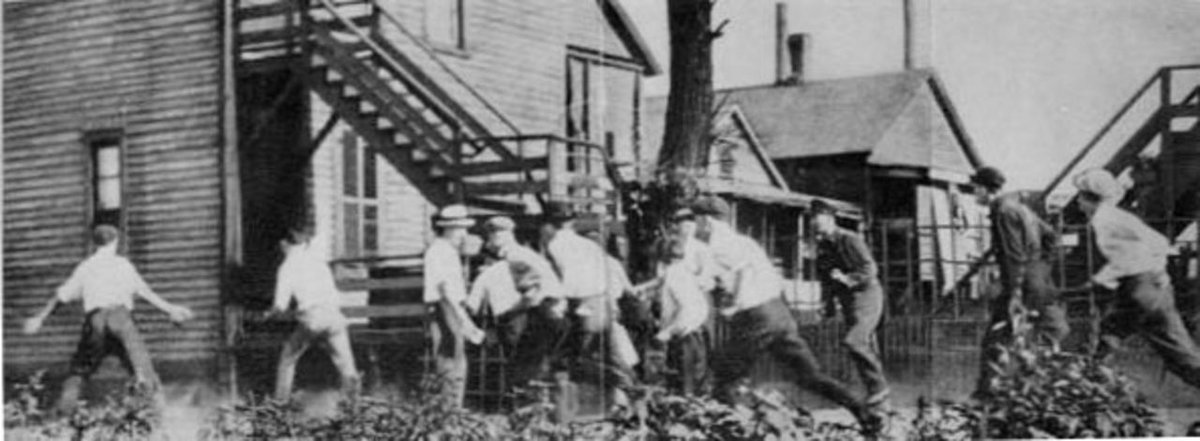
A White gang looking for Black people during the Chicago race riot of 1919

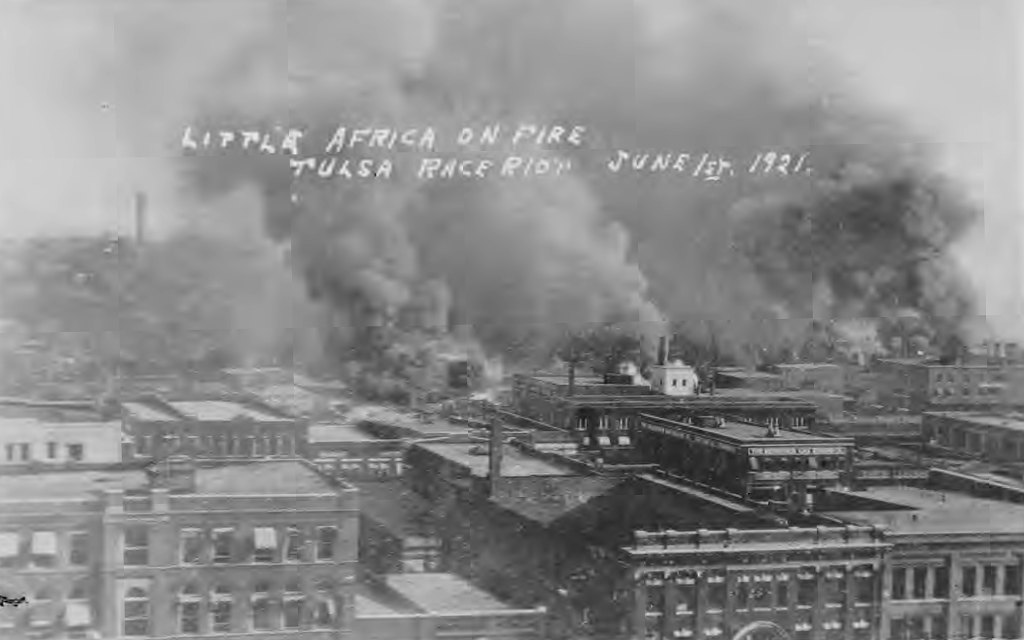
Buildings burning during the Tulsa race massacre of 1921

Lynching is defined as "a form of violence in which a mob, under the pretext of administering justice without a trial, executes a presumed offender, often after inflicting torture and corporal mutilation on him or her." It was a particularly ritualistic form of murder, and it frequently involved the majority of the members of the local White community. Lynchings were sometimes announced in advance and they were frequently turned into spectacle lynchings which audiences could witness. The number of lynchings in the United States dropped from the 1880s to the 1920s, but there were still an average of about 30 lynchings per year during the 1920s. A study of 100 lynchings which was conducted from 1929 to 1940 revealed that at least one third of the victims were innocent of the crimes of which they were accused.

Labor and immigrant conflicts were sources of tensions that served as catalysts for the East St. Louis riot of 1917. White rioters killed an between 39 and 150 Black residents of East St. Louis, after Black residents had killed two White policemen, mistaking the car which they were riding in for another car which was full of White occupants who previously drove through a Black neighborhood and randomly fired their guns into a crowd of Black people. Other White-on-Black race riots included the Atlanta riots (1906), the Omaha and Chicago riots (1919), some of a series of riots which occurred in the volatile post-World War I environment, and the Tulsa massacre (1921).

The Chicago race riot of 1919 grew out of tensions which existed on the Southside, where Irish Americans and Black residents were crowded into substandard housing and competed with each other for jobs at the stockyards. The Irish Americans had lived in the city for a longer period of time, and they also organized themselves around athletic and political clubs. Violence broke out across the city in late July. White mobs, many of which were organized around Irish athletic clubs, pulled Black people off trolley cars, attacked Black businesses, and beat victims. City officials closed the street car system, but the rioting continued. A total of 23 Black people and 15 White people were killed.

The 1921 Tulsa race massacre took place in Greenwood, which was a prosperous Black neighborhood in Tulsa, Oklahoma, home to around 10,000 Black residents and frequently called America's Black Wall Street. The race riot was precipitated by 19-year-old Dick Rowland, a shoeshine accused of attacking 17-year-old White elevator operator Sarah Page at a department store, being arrested on May 31, 1921. On June 1, a confrontation between Black and White groups outside the courthouse led to a shootout which killed 10 Whites and 2 Black people. The Black group then retreated back to the Greenwood District. Subsequently, a White mob attacked Black businesses, homes, and residents in the Greenwood District. The attack left over 35 city blocks burned, over 800 people injured, and between 100 and 300 people were killed. Over 6,000 Black residents were also arrested by the Oklahoma National Guard, and taken to several internment centers.

=== Civil rights movement era (1940–1971) ===
Under tremendous pressure, the Roosevelt administration produced anti-racist propaganda and it also employed African Americans in some industries. Unfortunately, African Americans were still being subjected to racial violence, especially in the South. In March 1956, Sam Ervin, United States Senator of North Carolina, wrote the Southern Manifesto, which promised to fight to keep Jim Crow alive by all legal means.

This continuation of support for the enforcement of Jim Crow and other segregation laws led to protests in which many African-Americans were violently injured out in the open at lunchroom counters, buses, polling places and local public areas. These protests did not eviscerate racism, instead, they prevented racists from expressing their feelings out in the open and in response, racists expressed their feelings in more coded or metaphorical linguistic terms.

By the 1960s, decades of racial, economic, and political discrimination by political forces, which generated inner city poverty, resulted in race riots within minority areas of cities across the United States. The beating and rumored death of cab driver John Smith by police, sparked the 1967 Newark riots. This event became, per capita, one of the deadliest civil disturbances of the 1960s. The long and short term causes of the Newark riots are explored in depth in the documentary film Revolution '67 and many news reports of the times. The riots in Newark spread across the United States in most major cities and over 100 deaths were reported. Many inner city neighborhoods in these cities were destroyed. The April 1968 assassination of Martin Luther King Jr. in Memphis, Tennessee and the June assassination of Robert F. Kennedy in Los Angeles also led to nationwide rioting with similar mass deaths. During the same time period, and since then, numerous violent acts committed against African-American churches have been reported.

=== Modern era (1972–present) ===
Today racial violence has changed dramatically, because openly violent acts of racism are less prevalent, but acts of police brutality and the mass incarceration of racial minorities are continuing to be major issues within the United States. The war on drugs has been noted as a direct cause of the dramatic increase in the number of incarcerations in the nation's prison system, which has risen from 300,000 in 1980 to more than 2,000,000 in 2000.

During the 1980s and '90s a number of riots occurred that were related to longstanding racial tensions between police and minority communities. The 1980 Miami riots were catalyzed by the killing of an African-American motorist by four white Miami-Dade Police officers. They were subsequently acquitted on charges of manslaughter and evidence tampering. Similarly, the six-day 1992 Los Angeles riots erupted after the acquittal of four white LAPD officers who had been filmed beating Rodney King, an African-American motorist. Khalil Gibran Muhammad, the Director of the Harlem-based Schomburg Center for Research in Black Culture has identified more than 100 instances of mass racial violence in the United States since 1935 and has noted that almost every instance was precipitated by a police incident.

The Cincinnati riots of 2001 were caused by the killing of 19-year-old African-American Timothy Thomas by white police officer Stephen Roach, who was subsequently acquitted on charges of negligent homicide. The 2014 Ferguson unrest occurred against a backdrop of racial tension between police and the Black community of Ferguson, Missouri in the wake of the police shooting of Michael Brown; similar incidents elsewhere such as the killing of Trayvon Martin sparked smaller and isolated protests. According to the Associated Press' annual poll of United States news directors and editors, the top news story of 2014 was police killings of unarmed Black people, including Brown, as well as the investigations and the protests afterward. During the 2017 Unite the Right rally, an attendee drove his car into a crowd of people protesting the rally, killing 32-year-old Heather D. Heyer and injuring 19 others, and was indicted on federal hate crime charges.

In 2020, the police killing of Breonna Taylor and the murders of Ahmaud Arbery and George Floyd sparked riots in America racial unrest over systemic racism and police brutality against African Americans. Riots during the summer resulted in destruction of property, mass looting, monument removals, and incidences of violence by counter-protesters and police across the United States. The Trump administration condemned violence during the movement and responded by threatening to quell demonstrations, for which it drew criticism. In June, president Donald Trump threatened to use the military to disperse protesters by invoking the Insurrection Act of 1807. Federal law enforcement agencies were eventually deployed to assist local authorities and protect public property in Washington, D.C.

== Timeline of events ==
=== Nativist period (1700s–1860) ===
- 1811: German Coast uprising (Louisiana)
- 1814: Anti-Hispanic race riot with sailors, (Boston)
- 1823: Nativist launch raid on Irish neighborhood, (Boston)
- 1824: Hard Scrabble and Snow Town Riots, 1824 & 1831 respectively, Providence, Rhode Island
- 1826: Multiple forays on Irish neighborhoods, (Boston)
- 1828: Riot between English/Irish Protestants against Irish Catholics in South Boston, (Boston)
- 1829: Cincinnati riots of 1829 (Cincinnati). Rioting against African Americans results in thousands leaving for Canada.
- 1829: Boston anti-Catholic riots (Boston) Attacked homes of Irish Catholics, stoning them for three days.
- 1831: Nat Turner's slave rebellion (Southampton County, Virginia)
- 1831: Nativist attack Irish church, (Boston)
- 1832: Nativist attack Irish on Merrimack street, (Boston)
- 1832: December 31, rioters clash with the watch protecting Irish homes, (Boston)
- 1833: November 29, Nativist riot in Charlestown, (Charlestown, Massachusetts)
- 1833: December 7–8, Nativist riots in Charlestown, (Charlestown, Massachusetts)
- 1834: Ursuline Convent riots (Charlestown, Massachusetts, near Boston)
- 1834: New York anti-abolitionist riots (1834)
- 1834: Attack on Canterbury Female Boarding School, Canterbury, Connecticut
- 1834: Bangor anti-Catholic riot, Bangor, Maine
- 1835: Gentleman's Riot, numerous riots throughout 1835 targeting abolitionists, Boston, Massachusetts
- 1835: Snow Riot (Washington, D.C.)
- 1835: Five Points Riot (New York City)
- 1835: Destruction of Noyes Academy, Canaan, New Hampshire
- 1836: Cincinnati riots of 1836 (Cincinnati)
- 1837: Broad Street Riot (Boston)
- 1837: Montgomery Guards riot (Boston)
- 1837: Murder of Elijah Lovejoy
- 1838: Burning of Pennsylvania Hall
- 1841: Cincinnati riots of 1841 (Cincinnati)
- 1842: Lombard Street Riot, (a.k.a. the Abolition Riots), August 1, Philadelphia
- 1842: Muncy Abolition riot of 1842
- 1844: Philadelphia Nativist Riots (May 6–8 and July 5–8), Philadelphia
- 1844: Brooklyn riot, occurred on April 4 between nativists and Irish immigrants.
- 1846: Nativist riot, (Boston, Massachusetts)
- 1849: Astor Place riot, between immigrants and nativists
- 1851: Hoboken anti-German riot
- 1853: Cincinnati riot of 1853 (Cincinnati, anti-Catholic riot by German Protestants and Liberals)
- 1854: Bath, Maine, anti-Catholic riot of 1854 (Bath, Maine)
- 1854: St. Louis Nativist riots (St. Louis, anti-Irish Catholic riot)
- 1854: May 26, Failed rescue of fugitive slave Anthony Burns with the riot led by abolitionists, (Boston)
- 1854: May 7, "Angel Gabriel" Orr nativist riot, (Boston)
- 1854: June, Orr's followers brawl with Irish, (Boston)
- 1855: Rogue River Massacre; Chinese migrants killed by Native American tribes in connection with the Rogue River Wars in Rogue River, Oregon
- 1855: Bangor know-nothing/nativist riot; Irish and their taverns were targets of attacks from know nothing party in a combination of anti immigrant and pro temperance attitudes, Bangor, Maine
- 1855: Bloody Monday (Louisville, Kentucky, anti-German and Irish riots)
- 1855: Lager Beer Riot (Chicago, caused by raising taxes on alcohol for Irish and German immigrants)
- 1855: Cincinnati Nativist riots (Cincinnati, anti-German riots)
- 1856: Battle of Seattle (1856), Jan 26, Attack by Native American tribesmen upon Seattle
- 1856: Baltimore Know-Nothing riots of 1856, anti-Irish Catholic riots
- 1856: San Francisco Vigilance Movement, San Francisco (Nativist overtones)
- 1857: DC Nativist riot (Washington, D.C.)
- 1857: Dead Rabbits riot (New York City, anti-Irish Catholic riots)
- 1858: New Orleans Nativist riot (New Orleans, anti-Irish Catholic riots)

=== Civil War period (1861–1865) ===
- 1862: Buffalo riot of 1862 (Buffalo, New York), August 12, riots by German and Irish longshoreman over lack of pay from dock bosses.
- 1863: Bear River Massacre (near Preston, Idaho), January 29, following several years of violent clashes, U.S. Army attacked a Shoshone encampment, killing over two hundred indigenous Americans.
- 1863: Detroit race riot (Detroit), March 6, protests by working class over military draft for Civil War.
- 1863: New York City draft riots, July 13–16, also known as "Manhattan draft riots" or "Draft Week", violence broke out among the working-class in Lower Manhattan after new draft laws were passed by Congress for the Civil War. White protesters eventually turned their attacks towards Black people.
- 1864: Sand Creek massacre, November 29, also known as "the Chivington massacre", "the battle of Sand Creek", or "the massacre of Cheyenne Indians", the Third Colorado Cavalry of the U.S. Army attacked and destroyed a camp of Cheyenne and Arapaho people seeking Army protection in southeastern Colorado Territory, killing and mutilating as many as 600 Native American people, about two-thirds of whom were women and children.

=== Reconstruction era (1865–1877) ===
- 1866: New Orleans massacre of 1866 (New Orleans), July 30
- 1866: Owyhee River Massacre; a group of traveling Chinese miners were attacked by a Paiute war party, in which 49 Chinese miners were killed, Arock, Oregon
- 1866: Memphis riots of 1866 (Memphis, Tennessee), May 1–3, mostly ethnic Irish against African Americans
- 1868: Pulaski riot (Pulaski, Tennessee), January 7
- 1868: St. Bernard Parish massacre (St. Bernard Parish, Louisiana), October 25
- 1868: Opelousas massacre (Opelousas, Louisiana), September 28
- 1868: Camilla race riot (Camilla, Georgia), September 19
- 1868: Wards Island riot, March 5, Irish and German-American indigent immigrants, temporarily interned at Wards Island by the Commissioners of Emigration, begin rioting following an altercation between two residents, resulting in thirty men seriously wounded and around sixty arrested.
- 1870: Marias massacre (Marias River, Montana Territory), January 23, U.S. Army killed over 200 Piegan Blackfeet, mostly elderly, women and children.
- 1870: Eutaw massacre (Eutaw, Alabama), October 25
- 1870: Mamaroneck riot (Mamaroneck, New York), August 13
- 1870: Laurens, South Carolina, October 20
- 1870: Kirk-Holden war: (Alamance County, North Carolina), July – November, Federal troops, led by Col. Kirk and requested by NC governor Holden, were sent to extinguish racial violence. Holden was eventually impeached because of the offensive.
- 1870: New York City orange riot, July 12
- 1871: Meridian race riot, (Meridian, Mississippi), March
- 1871: Second New York City orange riot, July 12
- 1871: Los Angeles anti-Chinese riot (Los Angeles), October 24, mixed Mexican and white mob killed 17–20 Chinese in the largest mass lynching in U.S. history
- 1871: Scranton coal riot, Violence occurs between striking members of a miners' union in Scranton, Pennsylvania when Welsh miners attack Irish and German-American miners who chose to leave the union and accept the terms offered by local mining companies.
- 1872: Pattenburg Massacre, on the Muthockaway Creek, Hunterdon County, New Jersey. Black laborers working on the farm of a Mrs Carter are attacked while returning to their shanties after work by Irish laborers who had been working on a nearby tunnel. Three Black men Denis Powel, Oscar Bruce and another older Black man were shot and beaten beyond recognition. Three other Black men from the massacre were arrested, while their assailants remained at large.
- 1873: Colfax massacre (Colfax, Louisiana), April 13
- 1874: Vicksburg massacre (Vicksburg, Mississippi), December 7, attack on Black citizens, death toll estimates range from 75 to 300 people.
- 1874: Election Massacre of 1874 (Eufaula, Alabama), November 3
- 1874: Battle of Liberty Place (New Orleans), September 14, after contested gubernatorial election, Democrats took over state buildings for three days.
- 1874: Coushatta massacre (Coushatta, Louisiana), August
- 1875: Clinton Riot (Massacre) (Clinton, Mississippi), September
- 1876: Statewide violence in South Carolina (Hamburg, Charleston, Ellenton, Cainhoy, Edgefield, Mt. Pleasant, and Beaufort, South Carolina), July – November
- 1876: Hamburg massacre, (Hamburg, South Carolina), July
- 1876: Ellenton massacre, (Ellenton, South Carolina), September
- 1877: San Francisco riot of 1877 (San Francisco), July 23–25, a three-day pogrom waged against Chinese immigrants.

=== Jim Crow period (1877–1914) ===
- 1877: Group of white men burn down Chinese workers bunkhouse, robs and murders them, (Chico, California)
- 1878: Reno Chinatown burnt to the ground, Reno, Nevada
- 1880: Denver riot; a mob of Democratic voters rioted against Chinese residents in which one was killed, Denver
- 1881: Mass lynching of three Mexicans charged with murder, (Los Lunas, Valencia County, New Mexico)
- 1882: Mass killing of Chinese miners by white miners who were trying to rob them, in which 4 were killed, Hamer, Idaho
- 1885: Rock Springs massacre (Rock Springs, Wyoming), September 2, massacre of immigrant Chinese miners by white immigrant miners
- 1885: 1885 Pierce City lynching: Mass lynching of five Chinese people, Pierce, Idaho
- 1885: Eureka Chinese expulsion, Eureka, California
- 1885: Attack on Squak Valley Chinese laborers, Issaquah, Washington
- 1885: Coal creek anti-Chinese riot, Newcastle, Washington
- 1885: Tacoma riot (Tacoma, Washington), November 3, forceful expulsion of the Chinese population
- 1885: Chinatown and 25 other buildings totaling 35,000 dollars got burned down causing Chinese to be forced out, (Tulare, California)
- 1885: Chinatown burnt to the ground, (Pasadena, California)
- 1885: Mob attempts to burn Chinatown down, (Modesto, California)
- 1885: Black Diamond anti-Chinese purge, Black Diamond, Washington
- 1886: Seattle riot (Seattle), February 6–9
- 1886: Anti-Chinese riot, Olympia, Washington
- 1886: Anti-Chinese riot, Portland, Oregon
- 1886: Mob burns houses of Chinese and expels them, (Marysville, California)
- 1886: Forced expulsion of Chinese ranchers, (Nicolaus, California)
- 1886: Redding Chinese expulsion, Redding, California
- 1886: Red Bluff Chinese expulsion, Red Bluff, California
- 1886: Pittsburgh riot (Pittsburgh), September 19
- 1886: Albina and East Portland anti-Chinese purge, Portland, Oregon
- 1886: Oregon City anti-Chinese expulsion, Oregon City, Oregon
- 1886: Two are killed in forced expulsion of Chinese miners out to sea, (Juneau, Alaska)
- 1887: Denver riot (Denver), April 10, fighting between Swedish, Hungarian, and Polish immigrants resulted in the shooting death of one man and several others were injured before it was broken up by police.
- 1887: Chinatown burnt to the ground, (Dutch Flat, California)
- 1887: Hells Canyon Massacre (or Snake River Massacre) (Chinese Massacre Cove, Wallowa County, Oregon), May 27–28, massacre of thirty-four Chinese goldminers.
- 1887: Thibodaux massacre (Thibodaux, Louisiana), November 23, strike of 10,000 sugar-cane workers was opposed by local white paramilitary forces, who rioted and killed an estimated 50 African Americans.
- 1887: Chinatown burnt down, (San Jose, California)
- 1889: 1889 Forrest City riot, May 18, Forrest City, Arkansas
- 1889: Jesup riot, December 25, Jesup, Georgia
- 1890: Wounded Knee Massacre (Wounded Knee Creek, South Dakota), December 29, U.S. Army killed nearly 300 disarmed indigenous Lakota.
- 1891: New Orleans lynchings (New Orleans) March 14, a lynch mob stormed a local jail and hanged 11 Italians following the acquittal of several Sicilian immigrants alleged to be involved in the murder of New Orleans police chief David Hennessy.
- 1891: Lynching of Joe Coe (Omaha, Nebraska), October 10, a mob lynched Joe Coe, a Black worker who was suspected of attacking a young white woman from South Omaha. Approximately 10,000 white people, mostly ethnic immigrants from South Omaha, reportedly swarmed the courthouse, setting it on fire. They took Coe from his jail cell, beat him, and then lynched him. Reportedly, 6,000 people viewed Coe's corpse during a public exhibition, at which pieces of the lynching rope were sold as souvenirs.
- 1893: Napa Valley riot; white laborer's union formed and forcibly remove Chinese workers from working in plum orchards, (Napa, California)
- 1893: Fresno riot; white mob attacked Chinese grape pickers and left one worker in critical condition, (Fresno, California)
- 1893: Redlands riot; ordered Chinese to leave by nighttime, later white mob formed and burned and looted Chinatown, (Redlands, California)
- 1894: Buffalo, New York riot of 1894 (Buffalo, New York), March 18, two groups of Irish and Italian-Americans were arrested by police after fighting following a barroom brawl. After the mob was dispersed by police, five Italians were arrested while two others were sent to a local hospital.
- 1894: Bituminous coal miners' strike (Colorado, Illinois, Ohio, Pennsylvania, and West Virginia), April–June, Much of the violence in this national strike was not specifically racial. In Iowa, where employees of Consolidation Coal Company (Iowa) refused to join the strike, armed confrontation between strikers and strike breakers took on racial overtones because the majority of Consolidation's employees were African American. The National Guard was mobilized to avert open warfare.
- 1895: 1895 New Orleans dockworkers riot (New Orleans), March 11–12
- 1895: Spring Valley Race Riot of 1895
- 1895: July 4, riot of Orangemen vs Irish Catholics, (Boston)
- 1896: Newmarket Textile Mill riots of 1896, Americans vs. French immigrant workers; July 18-October 21, 1896; 10% of the buildings in Newmarket, New Hampshire have been burnt down.
- 1896: Linton, Indiana 300 black strikebreakers were expelled from the coal mining town of Linton after one of the strikebreakers shot a white boy. Eventually Black people were banned from living in all of Greene County.
- 1896: Mass lynching of Italians, (Hahnville, Louisiana)
- 1897: Lattimer massacre, September 1897, near Hazleton, Pennsylvania
- 1898: Lynching of Frazier B. Baker and Julia Baker (Lake City, South Carolina), February 22
- 1898: Phoenix election riot (near Greenwood County, South Carolina), November 8
- 1898: Wilmington massacre, an insurrection and municipal-level coup d'etat (Wilmington, North Carolina), November 10. A group of Democrats sought to remove democratically-elected African Americans from the political scene, by accusing African American men of sexually assaulting white women. About five hundred white men attacked and burned multiple black-owned homes & businesses including the Daily Record building which contained the office of that newspaper's editor, Alexander Manly. Manly had suggested in an editorial that African American men and white women could have consensual relationships. The estimated number of Black residents killed ranges anywhere from fourteen to at least 300.
- 1898: Railway riot northwest of Portland, Oregon
- 1899: Pana riot, April 10, Coal mine labor conflict; 7 killed, 6 wounded, Pana, Illinois
- 1899: Newburg, New York race riot (Newburg, New York), July 28, angered about hiring of African American workers, a group of 80–100 Arab laborers attack African Americans near the Freeman & Hammond brick yard, with numerous men injured on both sides.
- 1899: Mass lynching of Italians, (Tallulah, Louisiana)
- 1899: Carterville, Illinois A violent shootout occurred between striking white miners and non-union black miners who were brought into Carterville as strikebreakers. Five black miners are killed. All the surviving black miners left Carterville shortly after the riot.
- 1900: New York City race riot, occurred August 15 through 17th after the death of a white undercover police officer, Robert J. Thorpe caused by Arthur Harris, a black man.
- 1900: Robert Charles riots (New Orleans, Louisiana), July 24–27
- 1900: Tenderloin race riot (Manhattan, New York) August
- 1900: Burt Lake burn-out (near Cheboygan, Michigan), October 15, police and a mob of white men burned down a Native American town, at the behest of a private developer claiming ownership of the area.
- 1901: Pierce City, Missouri 300 black residents were expelled after white residents lynched three black men for allegedly killing a white woman.
- 1902: Rabbi Joseph funeral riot (New York City), July 30, Antisemitic riots initiated by German factory workers and city policemen against thousands of Jews attending Jacob Joseph's funeral.
- 1902: Decatur, Indiana A mob of 50 men forced black residents out of Decatur.
- 1903: Evansville race riot, Evansville, Indiana
- 1903: Joplin, Missouri White residents drove out Joplin's black residents following the lynching of a black transient for the murder of a white policeman.
- 1904: Springfield, OH – Springfield race riot of 1904
- 1905: Harrison, Arkansas – Resulted in the expulsion of Harrison's black residents.
- 1906: Springfield, OH – Springfield race riot of 1906
- 1906: Brownsville affair (Brownsville raid) (Brownsville, Texas), August 12–13
- 1906: Atlanta massacre of 1906 (Atlanta), September 22–24, after two newspapers printed stories about African American men allegedly assaulting white women anti-African American, violence broke out. Roughly 10,000 white men and boys took the street, resulting in the deaths of 25 to 100 African Americans, along with hundreds injured and many businesses destroyed.
- 1906: Argenta race riot (Little Rock, Arkansas), October 6–9, began when a white police officer in Argenta (North Little Rock) killed a Black musician, and another Black person was killed; racial tensions rose with exchange of gunfire, resulting in half a block of buildings burned down; whites rioted and some Black people fled the city.
- 1906: (Wahalak and Scooba, Mississippi), December
- 1907: (Yazoo City, Mississippi), June 8
- 1907: Bellingham riots (Bellingham, Washington), September 4
- 1907: Anti-Japanese San Francisco race riot, San Francisco, May 20
- 1908: Springfield race riot of 1908 (Springfield, Illinois), August 14–16
- 1908: Marshall County, Kentucky Whites led by a local doctor drove out Black people from the now extinct city of Birmingham and most of the rest of Marshall County.
- 1909: Greek Town riot (South Omaha, Nebraska), February 21, a successful Greek immigrant community was burnt to the ground by ethnic whites and its residents were forced to leave town.
- 1909: Harrison, Arkansas – Resulted in the expulsion of Harrison's black residents.
- 1910: Nationwide riots following the heavyweight championship fight between Jack Johnson and Jim Jeffries in Reno, Nevada on July 4.
- 1910: Slocum massacre (around Slocum, Texas), July 29–30, between eight and two hundred Black residents were killed by hundreds of armed white men. Eleven white men were arrested, but none went to trial.
- 1912: lynching and racial expulsion in Forsyth County, Georgia, October and following months
- 1913: Mass lynching of 9 Mexican bandits, (El Paso, Texas)

=== World wars, interwar period, and post war period (1914–1954) ===
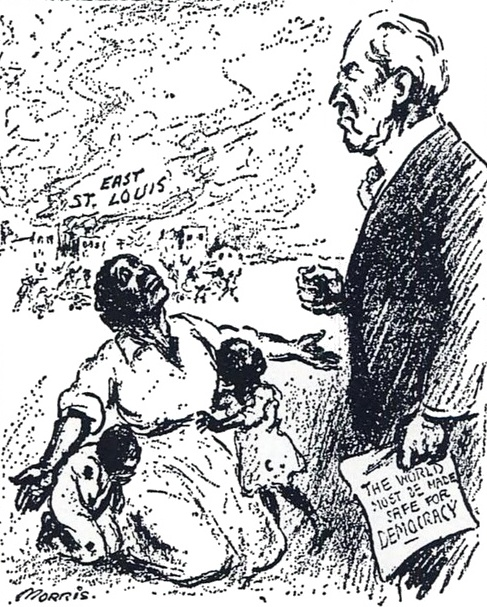
A political cartoon about the East St. Louis massacres of 1917; the caption reads, "Mr. President, why not make America safe for democracy?"

- 1915: Leyden riot. Anti-Protestant riots; Catholics riot over ministers criticizing parochial schools, (Haverhill, Massachusetts)
- 1915: Mass lynching of 11 supposed Mexican bandits, (Lyford, Texas)
- 1915: Mass lynching of 10 Mexican Americans, (Olmito, Texas)
- 1915: Mass lynching of 5 Mexicans, (Culberson County, Texas)
- 1915: Mass lynching of 6 Mexicans, (Brownsville, Texas)
- 1915: Mass lynching of 4 Mexicans, (Douglas, Arizona)
- 1917: Anti-Greek riots occurred in Salt Lake City which "almost resulted" in lynching of a Greek immigrant.
- 1917: El Paso, Texas. The 1917 Bath riots took place over a two-day period from January 28–30. The riot started after a 17-year-old woman by the name Carmelita Torres was ordered to be disembark and submit to the disinfection process but she refused to, having heard reports that nude women were being photographed while in the baths. She requested permission to enter without submitting to bathing and was refused. She then demanded a refund of her fare and upon refusal of a refund convinced the other women on her cable car to protest. The women began shouting and hurling stones at health and immigration officials, sentries and civilians, who had gathered to watch the disturbance. As the rioting went on, men began joining in on the rioting.
- 1917: East St. Louis riots. On July 1 in East St. Louis, Illinois, an African-American man was rumored to have killed a white man. Violence against African-Americans continued for a week, resulting in estimations of 40 to 200 dead African-Americans. In addition, almost 6,000 African-Americans lost their homes during the riots, then fled East St. Louis.
- 1917: Chester, Pennsylvania. The 1917 Chester race riot took place over four days in July. White hostility toward southern Black people moving to Chester for wartime economy jobs erupted into a four-day melee sparked by the stabbing of a white man by a Black man. Mobs of hundreds of people fought throughout the city and the violence resulted in 7 deaths, 28 gunshot wounds, 360 arrests and hundreds of hospitalizations.
- 1917: Lexington, Kentucky. Tensions already existed between Black and white populations over the lack of affordable housing in the city during the Great Migration. On the day of the riot, September 1, the Colored A.&M. Fair, one of the largest African American fairs in the South, on Georgetown Pike attracted more African Americans from the surrounding area into the city. Also during this time, some National Guard troops were camping on the edge of the city. Three troops passed in front of an African American restaurant and shoved some people on the sidewalk. A fight broke out, reinforcements for the troops and citizens both appeared, and soon a riot had begun. The Kentucky National Guard was summoned, and once the riot had ended, armed soldiers on foot and mount and police patrolled the streets. All other National Guard troops were barred from the city streets until the fair ended.
- 1917: Houston. Following an incident where police officers arrested and assaulted black soldiers, many of their comrades mutinied and marched to Houston. There they opened fire and killed eleven civilians (including a minor, Freddie Winkler) and five policemen. Four black soldiers were killed by friendly fire.
- 1918: Philadelphia
- 1918: Porvenir, Texas
- 1919: Red Summer. Tension in the summer of 1919 stemmed significantly from white soldiers returning from World War I and finding that their jobs had been taken by African-Americans moving north as part of the Great Migration.
  - Elaine massacre (Elaine, Arkansas)
  - Washington race riot of 1919
  - Jenkins County, Georgia, riot of 1919
  - Macon, Mississippi, race riot
  - Chicago race riot of 1919
  - Baltimore riot of 1919
  - Omaha race riot of 1919
  - Charleston riot of 1919
  - Longview, Texas
  - Knoxville riot of 1919 (Knoxville, Tennessee)
- 1920: Ocoee massacre (Ocoee, Florida). To stop African Americans from voting; Ocoee ended up almost all white.
- 1920: West Frankfort, Illinois
- 1921: Springfield race riot of 1921 (Springfield, Ohio)
- 1921: Tulsa race massacre (Tulsa, Oklahoma)

Between May 31st and June 1st, a young white woman accused an African American man of grabbing her arm in an elevator. The man, Dick Rowland, was arrested and police launched an investigation. A mob of armed white men gathered outside the Tulsa County Courthouse, where gunfire ensued. During the violence, 1,250 homes were destroyed and roughly 6,000 African-Americans were imprisoned after the Oklahoma National Guard was called in. The state of Oklahoma reports that twenty-six African-Americans died along with 10 whites.

- 1922 Perry massacre (Perry, Florida)
- 1923: Rosewood Massacre (Rosewood, Florida)
- 1923: Blanford, Indiana Ku Klux Klan-led expulsion.
- 1925: White residents of Toledo, Oregon, forcibly evict more than 30 Asian immigrants in the July Toledo incident.
- 1926: Harlem riots of July 1926, between unemployed Jews and Puerto Ricans over jobs and housing. This riot started on One Hundred and Fifteenth Street (115th), between Lenox and Park Avenues. Reserves from four Police precincts struggled for nearly half an hour before they dispersed a crowd estimated at more than 2,000 and brought temporary peace to the neighborhood.
- 1926: Mass lynching of 4 Mexican Americans and an Austrian, (Raymondville, Texas)
- 1927: Little Rock, Arkansas: Lynching of John Carter, a suspect in a murder, was followed by rioting by 5,000 whites in the city, who destroyed a Black business area
- 1927 Poughkeepsie, New York

A wave of civil unrest, violence, and vandalism by local White mobs against Black people, as well Greek, Jewish, Chinese and Puerto Rican targets in the community.

- 1927: Yakima Valley, WA — Yakima Valley riots (anti-Filipino)
- 1928: Wenatchee Valley — Wenatchee Valley anti-Filipino riot
- 1929: Exeter, CA — Exeter anti-Filipino riot
- 1930: Watsonville, California anti-Filipino riot
- 1931: Arthur and Edith Lee House incident.
- 1931: Housing protests, August 3, Chicago
- 1931: Hawaii riot, Hawaii
- 1933: December 17, Chicago. Several hundred communists attacked a march organized by Ukrainian immigrants to protest the policies of the Soviet Union towards Ukraine. Over 100 people were injured as the communists threw bricks and rocks as well as beat people with clubs.
- 1935: Cincinnati race riot
- 1935: Harlem, Manhattan, New York City
- 1939: U.S. Nazi Riot, New York City
- 1943: Detroit

In late June a fistfight broke out between an African American man and a white man at an amusement park on Belle Isle. The fistfight spread and escalated into three days of intense fighting, which ended when 6,000 United States Army troops were brought in to impose a curfew. The riot resulted in the deaths of twenty-five African-Americans and nine whites, and seven hundred being injured.

- 1942: Sojourner Truth Homes Riot, February 28, Detroit, Michigan
- 1943: Beaumont race riot of 1943
- 1943: Harlem, Manhattan, New York City
- 1943: Los Angeles
- 1944: Guam
- 1946: Columbia race riot of 1946, February 25–26, Columbia, Tennessee
- 1946: Airport Homes race riots, Chicago
- 1947: Fernwood Park race riot, mid-August, Fernwood, Chicago
- 1947: July 25–28, Chicago, about 2,000 whites gathered outside a house at 7153 South Saint Lawrence Avenue after a black postal worker named Roscoe Johnson bought it. The house was firebombed and nearly destroyed and disturbances occurred in the neighborhood for three days after the initial violence.
- 1949: Fairground Park riot, June 21, St. Louis
- 1949: Anacostia Pool Riot, June 29, Anacostia, Washington, D.C.
- 1949: Peekskill riots, Peekskill, New York
- 1949: Englewood race riot, November 8–12, Englewood, Chicago
- 1951: Cicero race riot of 1951, July 12, Cicero, Illinois
- 1953: White residents of the Trumbull Park Homes rioted for weeks after a black family was moved into the project. More riots occurred after 10 more black families were moved in.
- 1954: Vienna, Illinois White residents burned down all the black homes of Vienna and nearby areas outside city limits. The expulsion was sparked by the murder of an elderly white woman and the attempted rape of her teenage granddaughter by two black men.

=== Civil rights movement era (1955–1973) ===
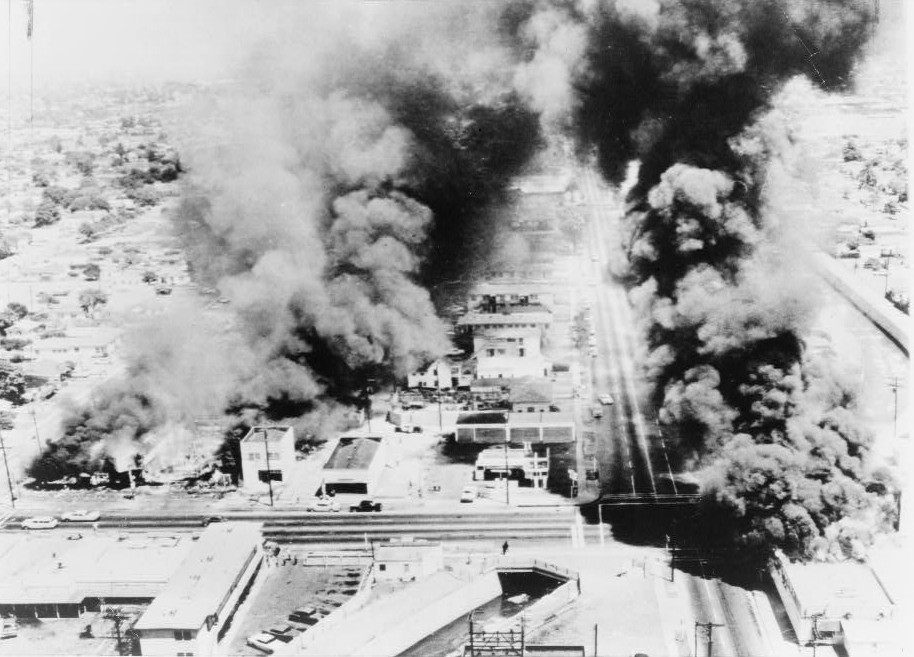
Buildings burning during Watts riot

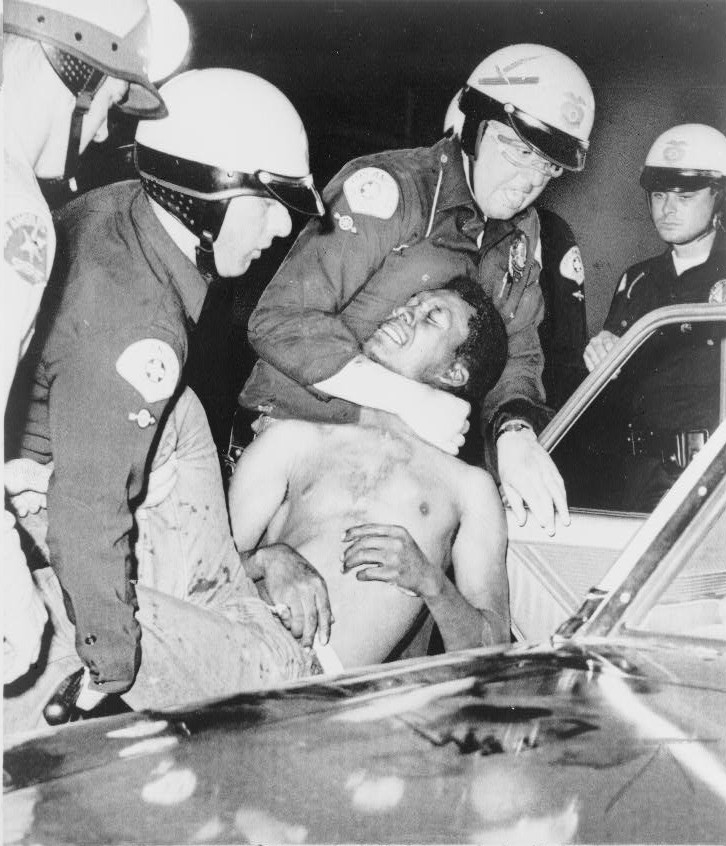
Police make arrests during protest actions

- 1956: Mansfield School Integration Incident 400 pro-segregationists brandishing weapons and racist signage prevent 12 black children from entering Mansfield High School Mansfield, Texas
- 1958: Battle of Hayes Pond, January 18, Maxton, North Carolina, Armed confrontation between members of the NC Lumbee tribe and the KKK.
- 1960: Ax Handle Saturday, August 27, Jacksonville, Florida
- Ole Miss riot of 1962, September 30–October 1; Oxford, Mississippi
- Birmingham riot of 1963; Birmingham, Alabama – May
- Cambridge riot of 1963; Cambridge, Maryland – June
- Chester school protests of 1964; Chester, Pennsylvania – April
- Rochester 1964 race riot; Rochester, New York – July
- New York City 1964 riot; New York City – July
- Philadelphia 1964 race riot; Philadelphia – August
- Jersey City 1964 race riot, August 2–4, Jersey City, New Jersey
- Paterson 1964 race riot, August 11–13, Paterson, New Jersey
- Elizabeth 1964 race riot, August 11–13, Elizabeth, New Jersey
- Chicago 1964 race riot, Dixmoor race riot, August 16–17, Chicago
- Watts riot of 1965; Los Angeles, California – August: This predominately African-American neighborhood exploded with violence from August 11 to August 17 after the arrest of 21-year old Marquette Frye, a Black motorist who was arrested by a white highway patrolman. During his arrest a crowd had gathered and a fight broke out between the crowd and the police, escalating to the point in which rocks and concrete were thrown at police. 30,000 people were recorded participating in the riots and fights with police, which left thirty four people dead, 1,000 injured and 4,000 arrested.
- 1966: Omaha riot of 1966, July 2, Omaha, Nebraska
- 1966: 1966 Chicago West-Side riots, July 12–15, Chicago, Illinois
- 1966: 1966 New York City riots, July 14–20, New York City, a riot broke out following a dispute between white and black youths. One person was killed and 53 injured. There were three arson incidents and 82 arrests.
- 1966: Perth Amboy riots, August 2–5, Perth Amboy, New Jersey, a riot broke out following the arrest of a Hispanic man for loitering. Hispanic residents also disliked being treated negatively by the police and being ignored by the community. 26 injuries were reported (15 from law enforcement officers and 11 from civilians) and 43 arrests were made. Interference with firefighters occurred.
- 1966: Waukegan riot, August 27, Waukegan, Illinois
- 1966: Benton Harbor riots, August 30 – September 4, Benton Harbor, Michigan
- 1966: Summerhill and Vine City Riots, September 6–8 Atlanta
- 1966: 1966 Clearwater riot, October 31, Clearwater, Florida
- Hough riots, Cleveland – July 1966
- Division Street riots, Chicago – June 1966
- 1966: July 31, Chicago, white residents attacked 550 civil rights protesters who marched into their neighborhood.
- Marquette Park riot; Chicago, Illinois – August 1966
- 1966 Dayton race riot, Dayton, Ohio – September
- Hunters Point riot 1966 – San Francisco – September
- 1967 Newark riots, Newark, New Jersey – July
- 1967 Plainfield riots, Plainfield, New Jersey – July
- 12th Street riot, Detroit – July
- 1967 New York City riot, Harlem, New York City – July
- Cambridge riot of 1967, Cambridge, Maryland – July
- 1967 Rochester riot, Rochester, New York – July
- 1967 Pontiac riot, Pontiac, Michigan – July
- 1967 Toledo Riot, Toledo, Ohio – July
- 1967 Flint riot, Flint, Michigan – July
- 1967 Grand Rapids riot, Grand Rapids, Michigan – July
- 1967 Houston riot, Houston – July
- 1967 Englewood riot, Englewood, New Jersey – July
- 1967 Tucson riot, Tucson, Arizona – July
- 1967 Milwaukee riot, Milwaukee – July
- 1967 Minneapolis North Side riots Minneapolis-Saint Paul – August
- 1967 Albina Riot Portland, Oregon – August 30
- Orangeburg massacre, Orangeburg, South Carolina – February 1968
- King assassination riots, 125 cities in April and May in response to the assassination of Martin Luther King Jr., including:
  - Baltimore riot of 1968, Baltimore
  - 1968 Washington, D.C. riots, Washington, D.C.
  - 1968 New York City riot, New York City
  - West Side Riots, Chicago
  - 1968 Detroit riot, Detroit
  - Louisville riots of 1968, Louisville, Kentucky
  - Hill District MLK riots, Pittsburgh
  - 1968 Wilmington riots (Wilmington, Delaware)
  - Summit, Illinois, race riot at Argo High School, September 1968
- 1968: Glenville shootout and riot
- 1968 Miami riot
- 1968 Democratic National Convention
- 1969 York race riot, York, Pennsylvania – July
- 1969 Hartford Riots, September 1–4, Hartford, Connecticut
- Augusta riot, Augusta, Georgia – May
- Jackson State killings of 1970, Jackson, Mississippi – May
- Asbury Park riots, Asbury Park, New Jersey – July
- Chicano Moratorium of 1970, an anti Vietnam War protest turned riot in East Los Angeles – August
- East LA Riots, January 31, 1971 East Los Angeles, California
- Bridgeport Riots, May 20–21, 1971 Bridgeport, Connecticut
- Chattanooga riot, May 21–24, 1971 Chattanooga, Tennessee
- Oxnard Riots, July 19, 1971 Oxnard, California
- Riverside Riots, August 8–9, 1971 Riverside, California
- Camden riots, August 19–22, Camden, New Jersey
- Escambia High School riots, Pensacola, Florida
- Blackstone Park Riots, July 16–18, 1972, Boston
- 1972: Coast of North Vietnam — USS Kitty Hawk Riot (October 12–13)
- Santos Rodriguez riot of 1973, July 28, Dallas

=== Post-civil rights movement era (1974–1989) ===
- 1974: SLA Shootout, May 17, Los Angeles
- 1974–1976: Boston busing crisis
- 1975: Livernois–Fenkell riot, July 1975, Detroit
- 1976: Escambia High School riots, February 5, Pensacola, Florida
- 1976: Racial violence in Marquette Park, Chicago
- 1977: Humboldt Park riot, June 5–6, Chicago
- 1978: Moody Park riots, Houston
- 1979: Worcester, MA — Great Brook Valley Projects Riots (Puerto Ricans rioted)
- 1980 Miami riots – following the acquittal of four police officers in Miami-Dade County in the death of Arthur McDuffie. McDuffie, an African-American, died from injuries sustained at the hands of four white officers trying to arrest him after a high-speed chase.
- Miami riot 1982, December 28, rioting broke out after police shot and killed a black man in video game arcade. Another man was killed in the riots, more than 25 people were injured and 40 arrested. Overtown section of Miami.
- 1984: Lawrence race riot (Lawrence, Massachusetts), a small scale riot was centered at the intersection of Haverhill and railroad streets between working class whites and Hispanics; several buildings were destroyed by Molotov cocktails; August 8, 1984.
- 1984: 1984 Miami riot in Miami
- 1985: MOVE Bombing – May 13, 1985, the Philadelphia Police bombed a residential home occupied by the Black militant anarcho-primitivist group MOVE in Philadelphia.
- 1989 Miami riot – was sparked after police officer William Lozano shot Clement Lloyd, who was fleeing another officer and trying to run over Officer Lozano on his motorcycle.

=== Since 1990 ===
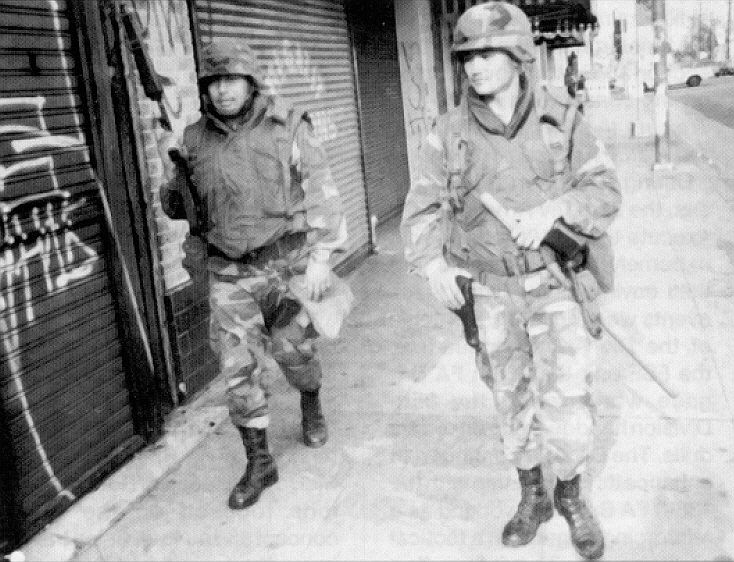
Patrol of National guard after riots in Los Angeles in 1992

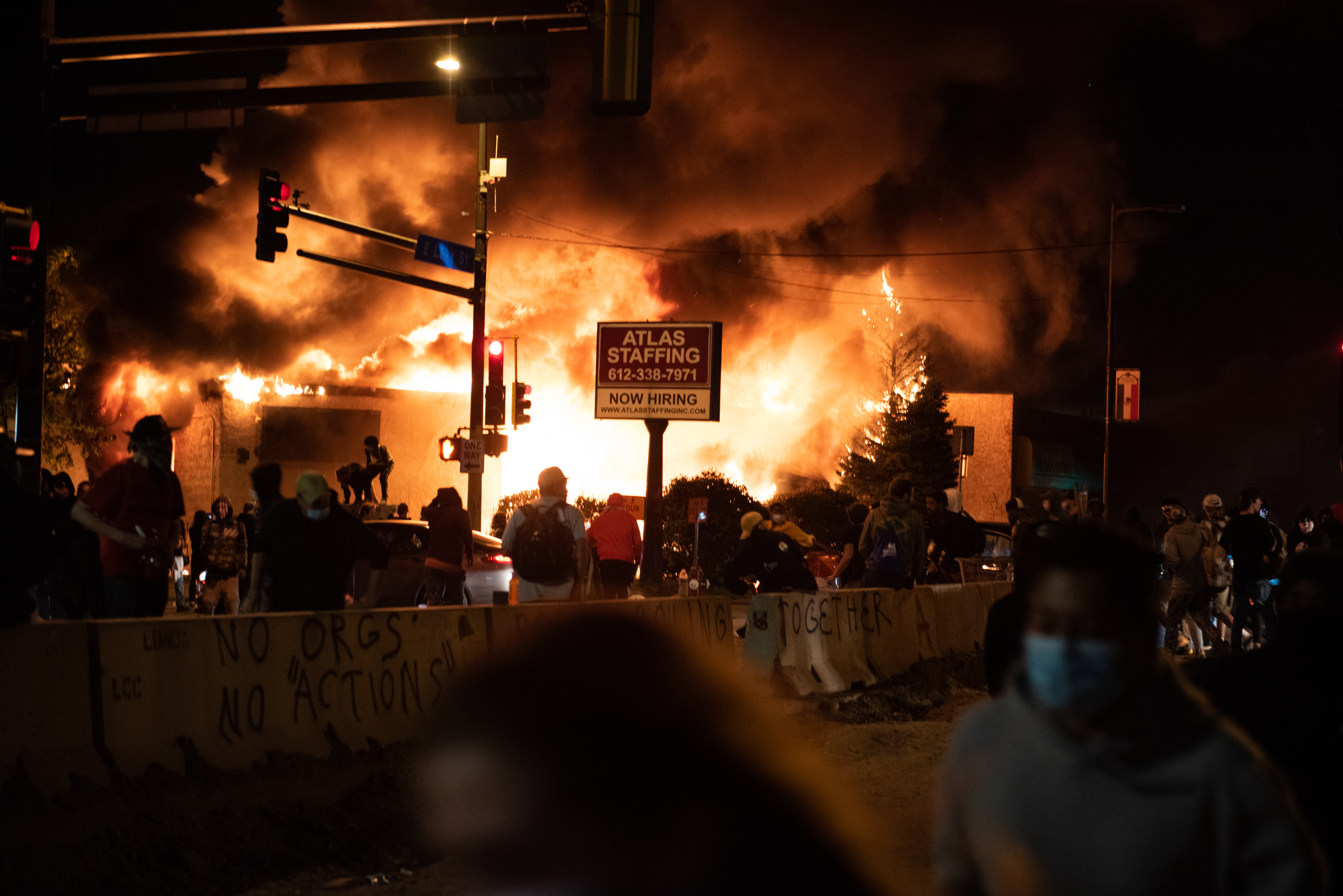
Rioters in Minneapolis during nationwide unrest in 2020

- 1990: Wynwood riot (Puerto Ricans rioted after a jury acquitted six officers accused of beating a Puerto Rican drug dealer to death)
- 1991: Crown Heights riot – between West Indian immigrants and the area's large Hasidic Jewish community, over the accidental killing of a Guyanese immigrant child by an Orthodox Jewish motorist. In its wake, several Jews were seriously injured; one Orthodox Jewish man, Yankel Rosenbaum, was killed; and a non-Jewish man, allegedly mistaken for a Jew by the rioters, was killed by a group of African-American men.
- 1991: Overtown, Miami – In the heavily Black section against Cuban Americans, like earlier riots which occurred there in 1982 and 1984.
- 1991: 1991 Washington, D.C. riot – Riots following the shooting of a Salvadoran man by a police officer in the Mount Pleasant neighborhood, aggravated by grievances which were felt by Latinos in the district.
- 1992: 1992 Los Angeles riots – April 29 to May 4 – a series of riots, lootings, arsons and civil disturbance that occurred in Los Angeles County, California in 1992, following the acquittal of police officers on trial regarding the assault of Rodney King.
- 1992: West Las Vegas riots, April 29, Las Vegas
- 1992: 1992 Washington Heights riots, July 4–7, Manhattan, New York City, Dominican community
- 1996: St. Petersburg, Florida riot of 1996, caused by protests against racial profiling and police brutality.
- 2001: 2001 Cincinnati riots – April – in the African-American section of Over-the-Rhine in Cincinnati
- 2009: Oakland, CA – Riots following the BART Police shooting of Oscar Grant.
- 2012: Anaheim, California Riot—followed the shooting of two Hispanic males
- 2014: Ferguson, MO riots – Riots following the Shooting of Michael Brown
- 2015: Charleston church shooting, June 17, Charleston, South Carolina
- 2015: 2015 Baltimore riots – Riots following the death of Freddie Gray
- 2015: Ferguson unrest – Riots following the anniversary of the shooting of Michael Brown
- 2016: 2016 Milwaukee riots – Riots following the fatal shooting of 23 year old Sylville Smith.
- 2016: Charlotte riot, September 20–21 – Riots started in response to the shooting of Keith Lamont Scott by police
- 2017: Assault of DeAndre Harris, August 12 – Far-right extremists cause the assault of DeAndre Harris during the Unite the Right rally in Charlottesville, Virginia
- 2020: United States racial unrest (2020–2023) – Protests sparked by the murder of George Floyd and other African Americans killed by law enforcement, numerous disturbances broke out in other cities.

== See also ==
- Colorism § United States
- Discrimination in the United States
- Hate crime laws in the United States – State and federal laws intended to protect against bias crimes
- History of civil rights in the United States
- History of immigration to the United States
- Human rights in the United States
- List of antisemitic incidents in the United States
- List of conflicts in the United States
- List of ethnic riots § United States
- List of expulsions of African Americans
- List of incidents of civil unrest in the United States – List of incidents from 1783 to the present
- List of massacres in the United States
- Lynching § United States
- Lynching in the United States – Occurrence of extrajudicial killings
- List of lynching victims in the United States
- Lynching of American Jews
- Lynching of Asian Americans
- Lynching of Hispanic and Latino Americans
- Lynching of Italian Americans
- Lynching of Native Americans
- Lynching of white Americans
- Lynching of women in the United States
- Nativism (politics) § United States
- Nativism in United States politics
- Political violence in the United States
- Racism in the United States
- Racism against African Americans
- Racism against Native Americans in the United States
- Radicalism in the United States – Historical American ideology
- Radical right (United States) – Political preference that leans towards the far-right
- Right-wing terrorism § United States
- Terrorism in the United States
- Domestic terrorism in the United States – Incidents of American terrorism
- Timeline of terrorist attacks in the United States
- White backlash#United States – Political theory
- White flight § United States
- White nationalism § United States
- White nationalism in the United States
- White supremacy § United States
- White supremacy in the United States
- Xenophobia § United States
- Xenophobia in the United States – Dislike of that which is perceived to be foreign or strange within the United States
