= 1885 Pierce City lynching =

1885 lynching in Idaho Territory

- Location: 46°28.284′N 115°49.08′W; Near Pierce, Idaho, United States (Note: In 1885, the name of the municipality was "Pierce City". However, according to journalist William E. Burrows, the name was eventually shortened to Pierce.)
- Date: September 18, 1885
- Attack type: Lynching
- Deaths: 5 people, including Lee Kee Nam
- Motive: Anti-Chinese sentiment
- Charges: None

On September 18, 1885, five Chinese people in the United States were lynched by a mob outside of Pierce City in the Idaho Territory. The individuals had been arrested by a vigilance committee formed in the city after the killing of a local businessman.

In 1885, Pierce City was a mining community in the Bitterroot Mountains of Idaho, in a region where vigilantism and extrajudicial killings were commonplace. On September 10, D. M. Fraser, a White American store operator, was found dead in an apparent killing. Residents of the city largely suspected that a local Chinese store operator, Lee Kee Nam, had committed the killing. A vigilance committee arrested Nam and four other Chinese people in the city and produced forced confessions from them regarding their involvement in Fraser's death. Following this, the five individuals were turned over to the sheriff's deputy of Pierce City. On September 18, the deputy and six deputized men were transporting the five individuals to Murray, the county seat of Shoshone County, for a trial when, a short distance outside of Pierce City, they were stopped by a mob of masked men. The men ordered the deputies to return to the city and lynched the five Chinese people, killing them via hanging. Following their deaths, Chinese ambassadors requested an investigation into the matter, with U.S. Secretary of State Thomas F. Bayard appointing Idaho Territorial Governor Edward A. Stevenson to conduct this. Stevenson harbored strong anti-Chinese sentiments and, according to historian W. Eugene Hollon, only interviewed individuals who were "known to be unfriendly towards the Chinese". In Stevenson's report to Bayard, he expressed concern over the vigilantism but opined that the five individuals had been guilty of Fraser's death.

No charges were filed in relation to the killings. The lynching came during a period of heightened anti-Chinese sentiment in the United States and both followed and preceded other incidents of ethnic violence committed by White Americans against Chinese people in the Western United States. By 1886, both the Democratic and Republican state affiliates had embraced anti-immigration platforms with regards to Chinese people. By the end of the 1880s, several other incidents of violence against Chinese people had occurred in Idaho. The lynching has been covered in a publication by the Idaho State Historical Society, and a state historical marker detailing the event and the broader topic of Chinese expulsion in Idaho stands near the scene of the killings.

== Background ==
=== Anti-Chinese sentiment ===
From the mid- to late-19th century, a large number of Chinese people immigrated to the United States, primarily seeking work in the mining industry and in railroad construction in the Western United States. Around the 1870s, ethnic violence by White Americans against the Chinese became more common, with examples of specific incidents including the Los Angeles Chinese massacre of 1871 and the 1885 Rock Springs massacre in Wyoming. With regards to the latter incident, which resulted in the death of 28 Chinese people, the federal government of the United States paid a restitution of $147,748.74 (equivalent to $5,294,329.85 in 2025) in 1887. By 1882, there were roughly 105,000 Chinese people in the country. However, that year, the federal government enacted the Chinese Exclusion Act, prohibiting immigration from China and causing a subsequent decline in the Chinese population in the United States.

=== Pierce City, Idaho Territory ===
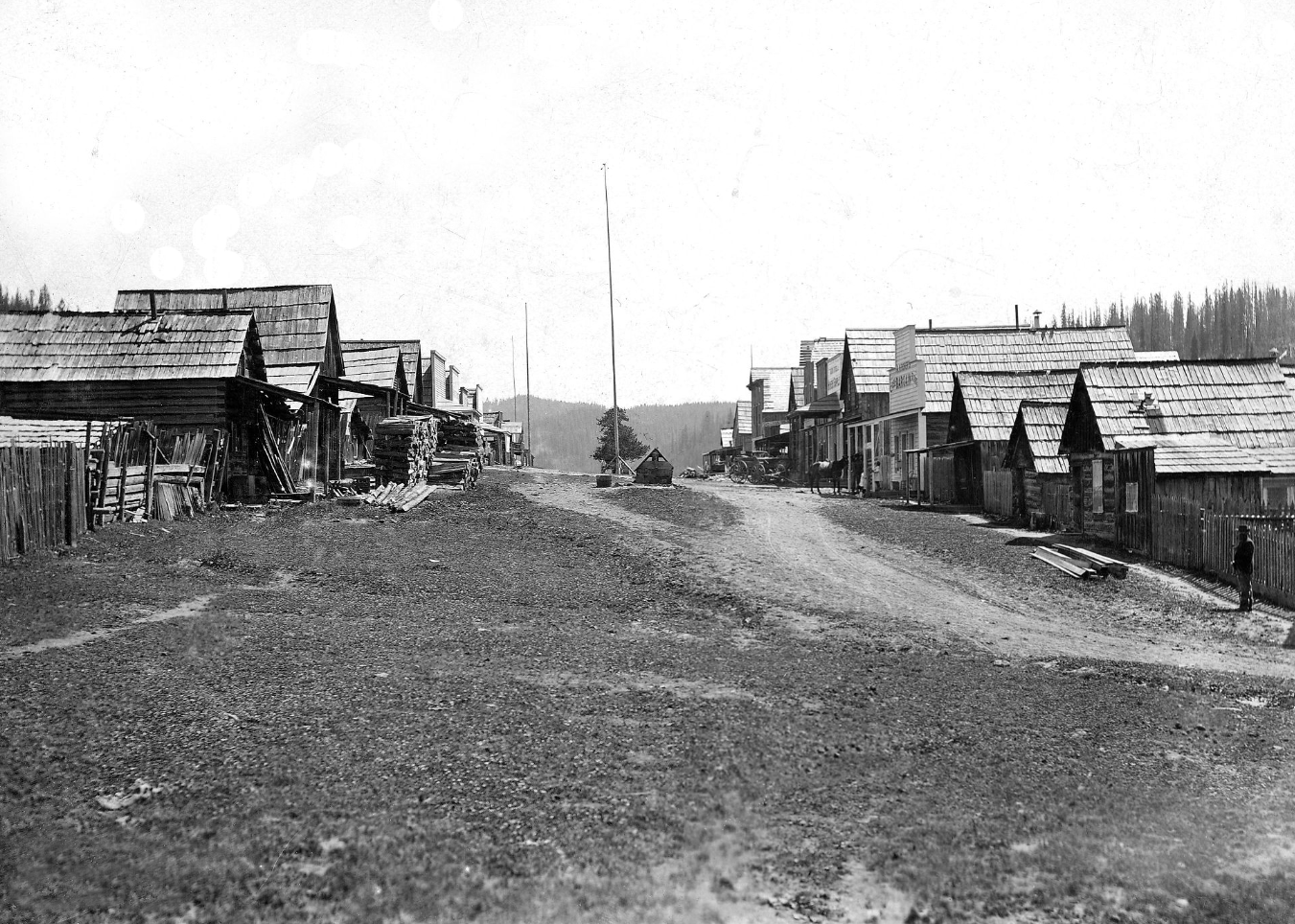
Pierce City in 1860

Pierce City was a city in the Idaho Territory that, in the 1880s, was a mining community and regional supply center. It was situated in the Bitterroot Mountains, to the east of Lewiston and west of Bannack and Virginia City. According to author William E. Burrows, this area was the site of largescale vigilante activities, with several vigilance committees in the region having been responsible for several dozen instances of extrajudicial killings. Per Burrows, the people of Pierce City "were very well versed in the theory and practice of vigilantism". While the city had been an early center for gold mining in Idaho, by 1885, many of the White American miners had left for other parts of the territory. By that time, a large Chinese community had been established in the city, with Chinese miners working in areas that had previously been mined by White workers.

== Killing of D. M. Fraser ==
On September 10, 1885, Pierce City resident D. M. Fraser was found dead. (Note: Multiple sources report this individual's surname as "Fraser". However, in a 1974 book, author W. Eugene Hollon gives the spelling as "Frazier".) Fraser, a White American, was an older member of the community who had been the operator of one of the municipality's main stores. Fraser's body had been discovered in his shop, with witnesses saying it had been "chopped to pieces". (Note: Multiple sources attribute this quote to a 1959 article by Kenneth Owens in Idaho Yesterdays that discussed the killing.) Near his body were a hatchet and a knife, as well as bloody footprints. Residents largely suspected that the killing had been committed by Lee Kee Nam, a Chinese man who operated a competing store in Pierce City. According to Burrows, Nam had been the "other leading merchant" in the city after Fraser.

Shortly after the killing, a group of men, including about 20 to 25 who had come to Pierce City from Lewiston, organized a vigilance committee, which the sheriff's deputy of Pierce City allowed to operate unimpeded. The vigilantes arrested Nam and his business partner, who they proceeded to torture until they both confessed against each other as Fraser's killer. Per Burrows, the committee choked Nam with a noose until he passed out, after which his business partner told the committee that Nam had been the sole murderer. However, after reviving and learning of this, Nam then accused his partner of being Fraser's sole murderer. In addition to these two individuals, the vigilantes arrested three other Chinese people, which included a barber, a gambler, and an individual who was engaged in prostitution. (Note: Sources vary on the identity of the additional three Chinese people who were arrested. Concerning the gender of the arrested, a 2012 article by David W. Chen of The New York Times states that the vigilantes had arrested "five Chinese men", while historian Helen McLure stated in a 2013 book that one of the five arrested individuals was a woman. Concerning the individual engaged in prostitution, sources vary between identifying them as either a "prostitute" or a "pimp". Historian W. Eugene Hollon, who stated in a 1976 work that the individual was a prostitute, cites a 1959 article in Idaho Yesterdays by historian Kenneth Owens that identified the individual as a "parasite". Owens himself cited a report of the lynching written by Governor Edward A. Stevenson that called the individual "a parasite of one of the Chinese prostitutes of the camp".) Per Burrows, the committee used intimidation in order to get these other individuals to confess to criminal activity. Historian Kenneth Owens stated that the committee accused these three other individuals of committing the murder which the two business partners had planned. Concerning these additional arrests, multiple sources state that the vigilantes used Fraser's killing as a rationale for targeting "undesirables" of the city's Chinese population.

== Lynching ==
Following the forced confessions, the vigilantes handed over the five Chinese individuals to the sheriff's deputy, who said that he would take them to Murray, the county seat of Shoshone County, in order for a formal trial to take place. For this prisoner transport, the deputy deputized six other men to assist him. The deputy, his deputized officers, and the five prisoners departed from Pierce City on September 18, with the trip to Murray expected to take five days due to the mountainous terrain. However, only a few miles outside of Pierce City, the deputies were stopped by a gang of masked individuals. These individuals were heavily armed and ordered the officers to give up their arms, return to Pierce City, and hand over the prisoners, which the officers did. This mob tied nooses around each of the prisoners' necks and attached the ropes to a pole that was suspended between two pine trees. The sheriff's deputy and his group returned to the scene later that day and found that the five individuals had been killed via hanging. According to later reporting from the Nez Perce News, the pole was broken in the middle and supported by a center post, leading them to believe that the lynching attempt had been tried twice, with the pole breaking the first time.

== Aftermath ==
=== Government investigation ===
Local newspapers reported on the lynching shortly after they occurred. After hearing of the incident, the Chinese merchant community in Portland, Oregon, dispatched several agents to the Idaho panhandle to investigate the killings. According to Burrows, these investigators reported that they believed that the five who had been killed had been responsible for Fraser's death. In a letter sent to the Chinese consulate in San Francisco, the investigators said that the killings had been racially motivated and baseless. The consulate sent a note to the Chinese minister in Washington, D.C., who asked the United States Secretary of State, Thomas F. Bayard, to conduct an official government investigation into the matter. Bayard forwarded this request to Edward A. Stevenson, the governor of the Idaho Territory. Stevenson was notified in April 1886, though he did not initiate an investigation until three months later due to poor road conditions in the region.

Stevenson first visited Lewiston, where a lawyer in the city prepared a letter for him to give to the justice of the peace in Pierce City. Concerning the investigation, the lawyer requested to the justice of the peace, "let it Clearly appear that the Chinamen who were hung [sic] were the real murders [sic] of Mr. Fraser, and that they were hung [sic] for committing the Act, and for that only". Additionally, the lawyer provided Stevenson a list of Chinese residents of Pierce City who were expected to say that the five killed had been guilty of Fraser's murder. In Pierce City, Stevenson spoke to the deputy, who was unable to identify the individuals who had committed the lynching. According to historian W. Eugene Hollon, the only individuals Stevenson spoke to during his investigation were individuals "known to be unfriendly towards the Chinese". In his official report sent to Bayard, Stevenson expressed concern over the vigilantism of those who had been involved in the lynching, but stated that he was convinced that the five people who had been killed had been the ones who had murdered Fraser, who he called "one of the best citizens of Idaho". Ultimately, no charges were filed concerning the lynching.

=== Later events ===
Following the lynching, anti-Chinese conventions were held in several places around Idaho, with the attendees expressing support for the expulsion of Chinese people. Groups in several municipalities in Idaho began to set deadlines for Chinese people living there to leave, and Chinese expulsion efforts were undertook in places outside of Idaho, such as Oregon and Washington. Stevenson was also supportive of Chinese expulsion, believing that they should be deported. In his report to Bayard, Stevenson stated that, while he would guarantee Chinese people in Idaho protection under the law, he hoped that "the day is not far distant when Congress will relieve us of their presence". By 1886, both the Idaho Democratic Party and the Idaho Republican Party had both taken stances against Chinese immigration. 1886 and 1887 saw several largescale instances of violence by White Americans against Chinese people, including a weeklong riot in Salmon and the Snake River massacre, which saw 31 Chinese people killed.

== Legacy ==
In 1959, the lynching was the subject of an article in Idaho Yesterdays, a publication of the Idaho State Historical Society. In 2005, historian James W. Loewen said that there is a state historical marker at the site of the lynching that describes both the incident as well as the broader topic of Chinese expulsion efforts during that time. Around 2012, the site of the lynching was documented by Seattle-based photojournalist Tim Greyhavens as part of a project to document sites of anti-Chinese violence in the Western United States. The project was covered in a 2012 article in The New York Times, which also published an image of the site.

== See also ==
- History of Chinese Americans in Idaho
- List of lynching victims in the United States
- Lynching in the United States
- Lynching of Asian Americans
- Mass racial violence in the United States

== Sources ==
- Burrows, William E. (1976). "The Compleat Vigilante". Vigilante!. New York City: Harcourt Brace Jovanovich. pp. 224–246. ISBN 978-0-15-193655-7. OCLC 2035082.
- Chen, David W. (August 13, 2012). "Picturing the Remnants of Anti-Chinese Violence". Lens: Photography, Video and Visual Journalism. The New York Times. ISSN 1553-8095. OCLC 1645522. Archived from the original on November 6, 2022.
- Cusic, Don (1994). "Chinese in the West". Cowboys and the Wild West: An A-Z Guide from the Chisholm Trail to the Silver Screen. New York City: Facts On File. p. 65. ISBN 978-0-8160-2783-5. OCLC 29520687.
- Daniels, Roger (1992) [1988]. Asian America: Chinese and Japanese in the United States since 1850 (Paperback ed.). Seattle: University of Washington Press. ISBN 978-0-295-80118-6. OCLC 928997752.
- Fisher, George (2024). Beware Euphoria: The Moral Roots and Racial Myths of America's War on Drugs. Oxford: Oxford University Press. ISBN 978-0-19-768848-9. LCCN 2023030162. OCLC 1401671495.
- Hollon, W. Eugene (1974). Frontier Violence: Another Look. New York City: Oxford University Press. ISBN 978-0-19-501750-2. OCLC 902514.
- Loewen, James W. (2005). Sundown Towns: A Hidden Dimension of American Racism. New York City: The New Press. ISBN 978-1-62097-454-4. OCLC 1097974044.
- McLure, Helen (2013). ""Who Dares to Style This Female a Woman?": Lynching, Gender, and Culture in the Nineteenth-Century U.S. West". In Pfeifer, Michael J. (ed.). Lynching Beyond Dixie: American Mob Violence Outside the South. Urbana, Illinois: University of Illinois Press. pp. 21–53. ISBN 978-0-252-03746-7. LCCN 2012028687. OCLC 1503857878.
- Nash, Jay Robert (1992) [1989]. "Chinese Riots". Encyclopedia of Western Lawmen & Outlaws (First Paragon House Trade ed.). New York City: Paragon House. p. 73. ISBN 978-1-55778-507-7. OCLC 25131018.
- Owens, Kenneth (2001). "Pierce City Incident, 1885–1886". In Dirlik, Arif; Yeung, Malcolm (eds.). Chinese on the American Frontier. Pacific Formations: Global Relations in Asian and Pacific Perspectives. Lanham, Maryland: Rowman & Littlefield. pp. 259–266. ISBN 978-0-8476-8532-5. OCLC 44019568.
