= Lynching of Cordella Stevenson =

Cordella

- Part of Jim Crow Era
- Map of Mobile and Ohio Railroad in Columbus, Lowndes County, Mississippi
- Date: December 15, 1915
- Location: Columbus, Mississippi
- Participants: A white mob
- Deaths: 1

Cordella Stevenson was an African-American woman who was sexually assaulted and lynched by a mob of white men in Columbus, Mississippi on December 15, 1915.

== Lynching ==
A barn owned by a white man, Gabe Frank, was burned down in a suspected arson attack. Stevenson's son was accused of burning the barn even though he had not been seen in the area for months. Local police arrested Cordella Stevenson and her husband Arch Stevenson and held them for six days hoping that she would tell them where her son was.

At 10:00 PM on December 15, 1915, a mob of white men broke into their home, gang raped her, and hanged her naked from a tree near the Mobile and Ohio Railroad.

Arch escaped on foot and ran into Columbus, but was unable to obtain aid. No one was ever arrested for Stevenson's rape and murder.

== See also ==
- Lynching of women in the United States

== Bibliography ==
Notes

References

- "Rape, Lynch Negro Mother". The Chicago Defender. Chicago, especially to African American readers in the Southern United States: Robert S. Abbott . 1915. ISSN 0745-7014. OCLC 18766972.
- Ginzburg, Ralph (1988). 100 Years of Lynchings. Black Classic Press. ISBN 9780933121188. - Total pages: 270
- Segrave, Kerry (July 8, 2010). Lynchings of Women in the United States The Recorded Cases, 1851-1946. McFarland. ISBN 9780786460083. - Total pages: 189
- Thompson, Julius E. (June 8, 2015). Lynchings in Mississippi A History, 1865-1965. McFarland. ISBN 9781476604251. - Total pages: 259
