= Lynching of Charlotte Harris =

Lynching in 1878, near Harrisonburg, Virginia, United States

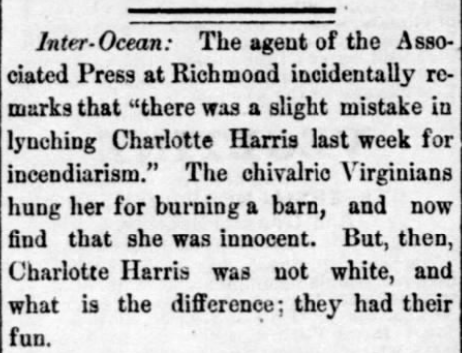
A notice about the lynching in The Oskaloosa Herald on April 25th, 1878: "The chivalric Virginians hung her for burning a barn, and now find that she was innocent. But, then, Charlotte Harris was not white, and what is the difference; they had their fun."

Charlotte Harris was an African-American woman who was lynched by a white mob on March 6, 1878, near Harrisonburg, in Rockingham County, Virginia. Harris was hanged after being accused of burning a barn belonging to a wealthy white family. Her body was left to hang from a tree for two days in full view of the roadway. The lynching of Charlotte Harris is the only recorded lynching of a Black woman in Virginia's history. The lynching attracted national attention. While local newspapers characterized Harris as a "bad woman", a number of newspapers elsewhere denounced the crime as "disgusting" and an "atrocity" that reflected poorly on the Commonwealth of Virginia. She was one of two possible women reportedly lynched in the history of Virginia; the other being Peb Falls, a white woman who was allegedly lynched.

== Details of the murder ==
On Thursday, February 28, 1878, a barn burned down that belonged to Henry E. Sipe, a white man living a couple miles east of McGaheysville in eastern Rockingham County. A 17-year-old teenage Black boy, Jim Ergenbright (or Arbegast), was arrested after being accused of arson. Charlotte Harris was later named by Ergenbright as the instigator. On March 6, Harris was arrested and placed under guard awaiting trial. At 11 pm on the same day, two men in blackface armed with cocked revolvers appeared at the jail and demanded the jailers hand over Harris. They were joined by a larger mob of white men in blackface. The mob dragged Harris four hundred yards up the road and hanged her from a blackjack oak tree.

== Commemoration ==
In September, 2020, a historical marker honoring Charlotte Harris was unveiled at Court Square in Harrisonburg, Virginia. The marker was placed by the Virginia Department of Historic Resources.

The historical marker reads:

About a dozen disguised people took Charlotte Harris from the custody of jailers in eastern Rockingham County on the night of 6 March 1878 and hanged her from a tree approximately 13 miles southeast of here. This is the only documented lynching of an African American woman in Virginia, and it received nationwide attention. A grand jury that met here failed to identify any of the lynchers. Harris had been accused of inciting a young African American man to burn the barn of a white farmer. This man was later acquitted on all charges. More than 4,000 lynchings took place in the United States between 1877 and 1950; more than 100 people, primarily African American men, were lynched in Virginia.

Local leaders spoke during the unveiling of the historical marker, including the Mayor of Harrisonburg.

== See also ==
- Lynching of Peb Falls
- Lynching of women in the United States
