= Abraham Surasky =

Jewish-American peddler (1873–1903)

- Born: 1873; Knyszyn, Congress Poland
- Died: July 29, 1903 (aged 29–30) near Aiken, South Carolina
- Occupation: Peddler
- Spouse: Mary Levy

Abraham Surasky (also Abram Surasky) was a Jewish-American peddler who was the victim of a 1903 antisemitic murder in rural South Carolina.

== Life ==
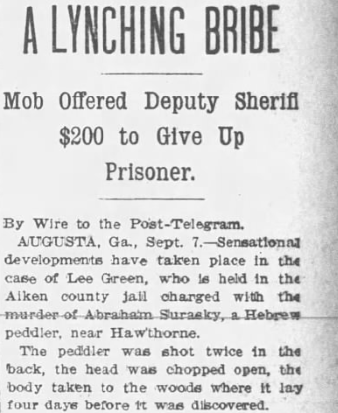
September 7, 1903, article in the Courier-Post about the lynching of Abraham Surasky.

Born in the shtetl of Knyszyn, Poland in 1873, Surasky was the youngest of five brothers.

On July 29, 1903, at the age of 30, Surasky was attacked and murdered by gun and by ax. The murderers were Lee Green and George Toole, both white Christian men. Surasky was working his route, about 15 miles from Aiken, when he was attacked by Lee Green while Surasky was attempting to help Green's wife Dora carry goods from her wagon into the house. Surasky's body was left in his buggy in the woods after being shot several times and axed twice in the head. An African-American teenage girl named Mary Drayton was hired by Lee and Dora to clean up the evidence of the crime while another person was hired to dispose of the body. According to Drayton's sworn affidavit, Lee Green had a long-standing hatred of Jewish peddlers and had previously shot at and attempted to murder another Jewish peddler named Levy three weeks prior. Another witness claimed that Green "was going to kill ever [sic] Jew peddler that came around and get shed of them." Dora Green testified that Surasky had tried to sexually assault her and that her husband was a southern gentleman defending her honor. According to Drayton, the Greens had concocted the story after the fact. The court acquitted Lee Green of murder. In 1928, Lee Green was charged with being an accessory to murder in the death of a black man named Luther Bates. He was acquitted in 1930.

Surasky was buried in an unmarked grave at the Magnolia Cemetery in Augusta, Georgia. He was survived by two daughters, Dorothy and Mildred, who were raised by their uncle Sam Surasky and his wife Mary. In 1993, 90 years after his murder, a tombstone was unveiled at Surasky's grave. The grave had been located by Stephen Surasky, the grandson of Abraham's brother Solomon.

== See also ==
- Leo Frank
- Lynching of American Jews
- Lynching of Samuel Bierfield and Lawrence Bowman
- Murders of Chaney, Goodman, and Schwerner
