= Lynching of Peb Falls =

Alleged 1897 lynching in Virginia, U.S.

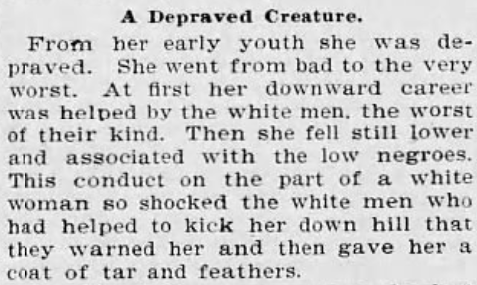
An article about the lynching of Peb Falls in The Miners Journal, October 1, 1897.

The lynching of Peb Falls was a reported lynching of a white American woman in 1897 in Rockingham County, Virginia. According to news reports, the body of Falls was discovered by a group of hunters on September 25, 1897, hanging from a Sycamore tree on Massanutten Mountain. News reports stated that while the perpetrators and their motive had not been proven, Falls had previously been tarred and feathered by a group of white men for associating with Black people. These accounts stated she had an unsavory reputation and was known to keep the company of "low negroes". Many newspaper accounts blamed the lynching of Falls on her Black companions, while some later accounts suggested she was lynched by the white men who had tarred and feathered her. She was one of two possible women lynched in the history of Virginia; the other being Charlotte Harris, a Black woman. While the Governor of Virginia at the time condemned the reported murder, several newspapers later claimed the lynching was a hoax or unconfirmed.

== Details of the reported murder ==
When hunters discovered the body of Falls about six miles outside of Cowan's Depot on Massanutten Mountain, her body was in the first stage of decomposition. According to an 1897 report in the Alexandria Gazette, Falls was once respectable but "her reputation had [become] unsavory and she was driven to the mountains where she slept in the fields and the woods". The Alexandria Gazette and other newspapers blamed her death on her Black companions. No effort was made to apprehend the perpetrators of the lynching. The Allentown Morning Call accused Falls of being "the worst white woman in the Virginia Mountains" who was "absolutely without moral character".

== Veracity of reported lynching ==
Virginia Governor Charles T. O'Ferrall responded to the reported lynching by condemning the violence and declaring the murderers would be punished if caught.

However, several newspapers later claimed that the reported lynching was unsubstantiated or a hoax. According to an October 1, 1897, report in the Rockingham Register, "Neither the Commonwealth's Attorney nor the Sheriff of Rockingham has received any information of the alleged hanging and they discredit the whole story absolutely."

== See also ==
- Lynching of Charlotte Harris
- Lynching of white Americans
- Lynching of women in the United States
- Yellow journalism
