= 1917 Chester race riot =

Race riot in Pennsylvania, United States

- Part of Mass racial violence in the United States
- Date: July 1917
- Location: Chester, Pennsylvania
- Caused by: White residents and workers hostility toward influx of black workers; Stabbing and killing of a white man by a black man
- Result: 7 deaths; 28 gunshot victims; 360 arrests; Hardening of racial divide in Chester's neighborhoods and workplaces

Parties
White rioters; White rioters	Law enforcement; Pennsylvania; Chester police; Pennsylvania National Guard; Pennsylvania State Police	Black rioters: Black rioters

Lead figures
William McKinney	Arthur Thomas

Casualties
- Deaths: 7
- Injuries: 28 gunshot wounds

The 1917 Chester race riot was a race riot in Chester, Pennsylvania, that took place over four days in July 1917. Racial tensions increased greatly during the World War I industrial boom due to white hostility toward the large influx of southern blacks who moved North as part of the Great Migration. The riot began after a black man walked in a white neighborhood with his girlfriend and bumped into another couple. This led to a fight in which the black man stabbed and killed the white man. In retaliation, white gangs targeted and attacked blacks throughout the city. Four days of violent melees involving mobs of hundreds of people followed. The Chester police along with the Pennsylvania National Guard, Pennsylvania State Police, mounted police officers and a 150-person posse finally quelled the riot after four days. The riot resulted in 7 deaths, 28 gunshot wounds, 360 arrests and hundreds of hospitalizations.

== Tension ==
Chester, a small town known for shipbuilding and textile manufacturing, had a community of approximately 4,400 blacks by 1900. The community included businesses and churches. Chester's neighborhoods, largely white and black middle- and working-class, were generally segregated by race, income and social status.

The increase in industrial manufacturing due to economic production related to World War I brought massive and disruptive growth to Chester. The Sun Shipbuilding & Drydock Co. opened in 1917 to build tanker ships, the idled Delaware River Iron Ship Building and Engine Works shipyard was revived as the Merchant Shipbuilding Corporation and the Baldwin Locomotive Works in nearby Eddystone produced locomotives and railway gun carriages for the war. Between 1910 and 1920, Chester's population increased from 34,000 to 58,000 due to an influx of southern and eastern Europeans as well as southern U.S. blacks arriving to work in the shipyards and other industrial manufacturing.

The hostility of Chester's white residents toward black residents grew as southern blacks migrated to Pennsylvania as part of the Great Migration. In 1910, Chester was home to approximately 6,000 blacks, 15% of the city's population. At the height of the World War I industrial boom, the population of blacks in Chester increased to 20,000, 25% of the city's population. Black workers lived in filthy and overpopulated segregated work camps hastily erected near factories. The white residents of Chester became frustrated with the rapid changes and congestion in Chester and placed the blame for these social ills on the influx of black workers. Many white workers viewed black workers as strikebreakers and resentment toward blacks in Chester mirrored race riots in East Saint Louis and Philadelphia. There were multiple cases of individual interracial violence in Chester leading up to July 1917.

Chester also had a reputation as a freewheeling destination for vices such as drugs, alcohol, numbers rackets, gambling and prostitution. Bethel Court was the "red-light district" of Chester, located in one of poorest black neighborhoods in the West end. In 1917, the regional interest in Bethel Court increased exponentially when army and navy officials in Philadelphia banned military personnel from frequenting brothels in Philadelphia. The increase in prostitution, crime and drunken behavior in Bethel Court was blamed on the black population in Chester.

== Riot timeline ==
Late in the evening of July 24, 1917, a black man named Arthur Thomas was walking with his female companion and another black couple through a predominantly white neighborhood in the city's West End. Thomas got into a verbal altercation with a white man named William McKinney which escalated into a fistfight. McKinney was stabbed multiple times during the fight and died soon afterwards. On July 25, an enraged mob of whites marched through the streets of Chester's black neighborhoods which initiated violent street battles that continued for four days.

Mobs of white rioters gathered along the strip of black owned businesses in Chester and attacked black workers going to their jobs. A mob of white people boarded a streetcar and assaulted black passengers. Mobs of 200 to 300 white rioters were reported roaming the streets and attacking blacks. A counter mob of 150 armed blacks gathered near Market Square in downtown Chester, fired their guns into a mob of armed white rioters and charged the group until police dispersed both groups. A black railroad worker fired his gun into a mob of white shipyard workers chasing him and killed one of them. There were reports of row homes being set afire with black occupants trapped inside.

On July 27, the mayor of Chester, Wesley S. McDowell, ordered all hotels, pool halls and liquor stores closed; forbade the carrying of weapons and implemented a curfew after dark. Delaware County Sheriff John H. Heyburn, Jr. declared a "state of riot" in Chester and forbade public assembly in the city. Local and state police, including mounted police officers along with a posse of 150 were able to restore order after four days of violence.

By July 30, seven people had been killed, twenty-eight suffered gunshot wounds, 360 arrested and hundreds treated for injuries at the hospital. It took several weeks for the violence to subside completely with individual acts of interracial violence continuing through August.

== Aftermath ==
After the riots, the mayor banned the sale of liquor to military personnel visiting Bethel Court. A local magistrate who set low bail amounts for black offenders before the riots was dismissed from office. The separation of blacks and whites in Chester's neighborhoods and workplaces became more defined.

== See also ==
- List of incidents of civil unrest in the United States
