= Lynching of women in the United States =

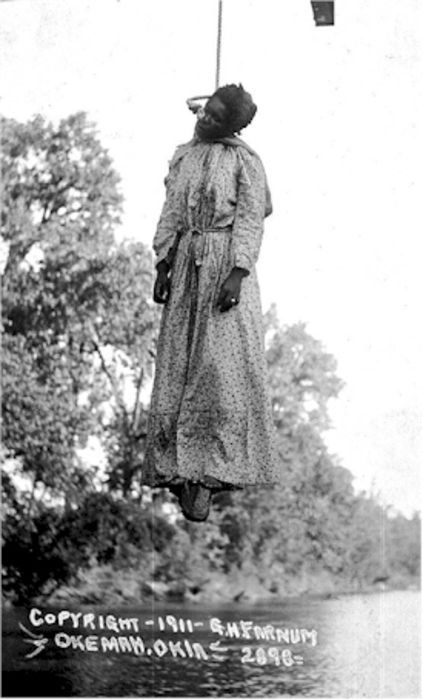
The lynching of Laura Nelson in Okemah, Oklahoma on May 25, 1911.

The lynching of women in the United States refers to the extrajudicial killing of women and girls between the 1830s and the 1960s. While the majority of lynching victims were African-American men and boys, the majority of female lynching victims were African-American women and girls. The lynching of Black women has sometimes been understudied by academics and overlooked by the general public. The role of white women as perpetrators of lynching is also understudied. Between 1865 and 1965, of around 5,000 Black lynching victims, between 120 and 200 Black women and girls were lynched, or around 3% to 4% of all victims. A small number of women lynching victims were white, some of whom were lynched for associating with African Americans. Other women lynching victims were Indigenous, Latina, or Asian. While women lynching victims were often "successfully demonized", the lynching of white women was more likely to cause "shock, horror, and condemnation" from the general public.

== History ==
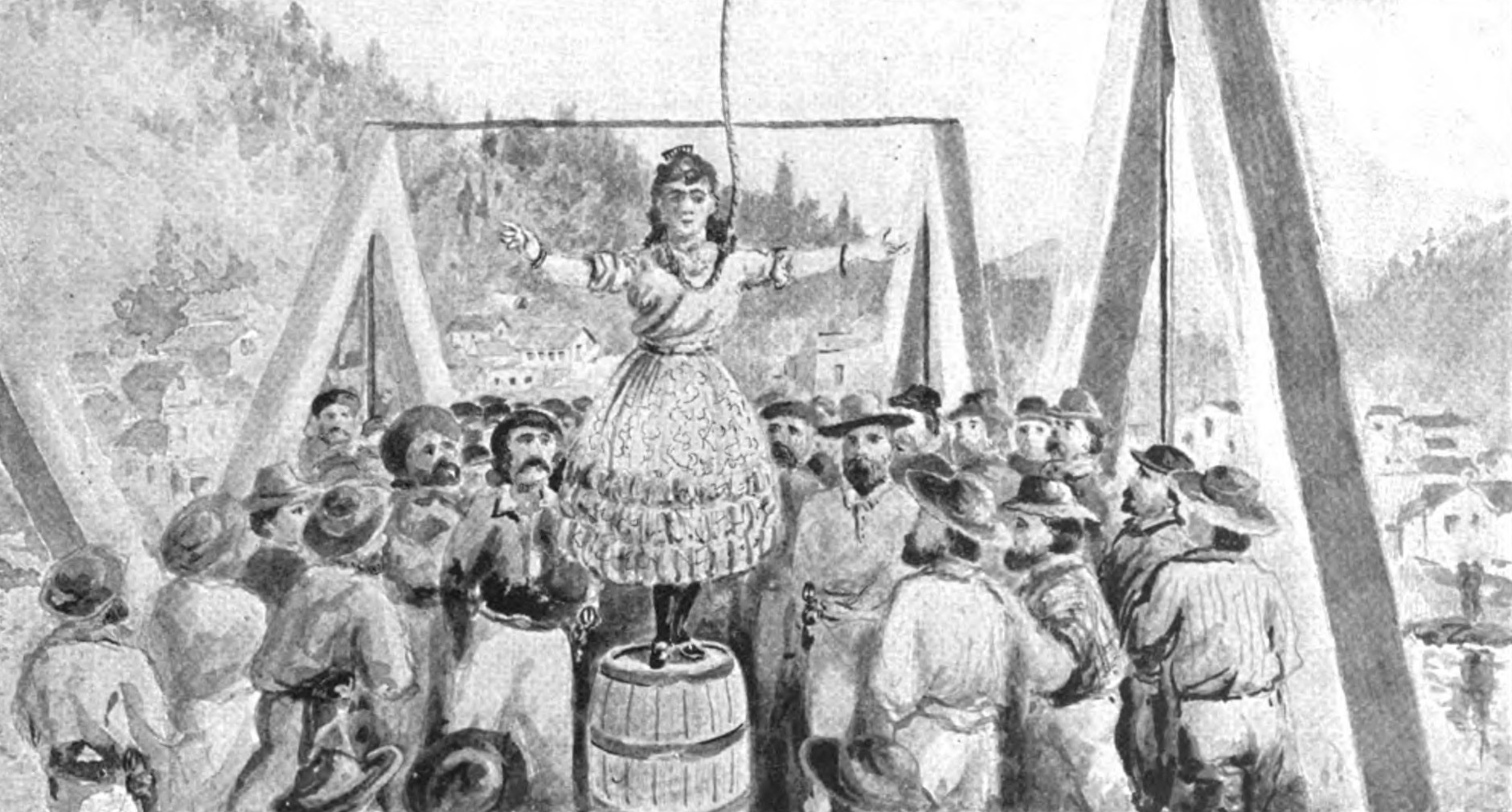
Artist's impression of the hanging of Josefa Segovia, from William Downie's Hunting for Gold, published 1893.

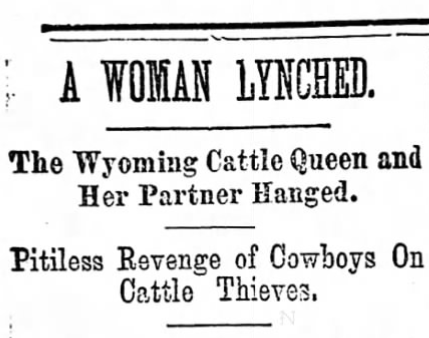
News article about the lynching of Ellen Watson, August 1889.

Due to the invisibility of Black women lynching victims, inaccuracies in historical scholarship, and cases of unconfirmed lynchings, compiling statistics regarding Black women lynchings presents challenges for researchers and historians. There also remains scholarly debate as to what constitutes lynching. In addition to extrajudicial killings of Black women and girls, many were also victims of legal executions and riots that targeted Black Americans regardless of sex.

Women were not lynched in Arizona, Idaho, Maine, Nevada, South Dakota, Vermont, or Wisconsin, as those states have no recorded lynchings.

Two women have been reportedly lynched in Virginia history. The 1878 lynching of Charlotte Harris near Harrisonburg is the only documented instance of a Black woman being lynched. The only possible instance of a white woman being lynched was the 1897 reported lynching of Peb Falls, also in Rockingham County, Virginia.

Following the lynching of Eliza Woods in 1896, the investigative journalist and civil rights activist Ida B. Wells denounced the lynching in The Gate City Press, an African-American newspaper in Kansas City, Missouri.

== List of women lynching victims ==
=== Black women ===
- Charlotte Harris - 1878, Virginia
- Harriet Finch - 1885, North Carolina
- Eliza Woods - 1886, Tennessee
- Mahala Jackson - 1893, Mississippi
- Louisa Carter - 1893, Mississippi
- Hannah E. Phillips - 1895, Texas
- Hannah Kearse - 1895, South Carolina
- Harriet Talley - 1895, Tennessee
- Julia Baker - 1897, South Carolina
- Eliza Goode - 1898, South Carolina
- Rose Etheridge - 1898, South Carolina
- Laura Cebron - 1898, Texas
- Ballie Crutchfield - 1901, Tennessee
- Betsy and Ida McCray - 1901, Mississippi
- Marie Thompson - 1904, Kentucky
- Laura Mitchell - 1910, Arkansas
- Laura Nelson - 1911, Oklahoma
- Mary Jackson - 1912, Texas
- Marie Scott - 1914, Oklahoma
- Rose Carson - 1914, South Carolina
- Bessie, Lena, and Sarah Cabiness - 1914, Texas
- Cordella Stevenson - 1915, Mississippi
- Mary Dennis - 1916, Florida
- Stella Young - 1916, Florida
- Alma and Maggie Howze - 1918, Mississippi
- Mary Turner - 1918, Georgia
- Bertha Lowman - 1926, South Carolina
- Betty Gardner - 1978, South Carolina

=== Latina women ===
- Josefa Segovia - 1851, California

=== Native American women ===
Multiple Southern Paiute women and one girl murdered during the Circleville Massacre - 1866, Utah

=== White women ===
- Kit Kelly - 1888, Texas
- Ellen Watson - 1889, Wyoming
- Sallie Molena and daughter - 1890, Texas
- Nancy Jane Crocker - 1895, Texas
- Peb Falls (reported, but unconfirmed) - 1897, Virginia

== See also ==
- Black feminism
- Lynching of American Jews
- Lynching of Asian Americans
- Lynching of Hispanic and Latino Americans
- Lynching of Italian Americans
- Lynching of Native Americans
- Lynching of white Americans
- Misogynoir
- Violence against women
