= 1970 Asbury Park race riots =

Race riots in New Jersey, US

The 1970 Asbury Park race riots were a major civil disturbance that occurred in Asbury Park, New Jersey between July 4 and July 10, 1970. The seven days of rioting, looting, and destruction left more than 180 people injured, including 15 New Jersey state troopers, and resulted in an estimated $5,600,000 in damages.

== Background ==
According to Katrina Martin in an article for the David M. Rubenstein Rare Book & Manuscript Library at Duke University,

"At the time of the riots, Asbury Park was a town of 17,000, 30% of which were African-American. The town’s population increased to 80,000 with summer vacationers. The Great Depression, followed by World War II, caused the resort industry in Asbury Park to change dramatically to keep up with the times. The fancy resort stays gave way to weekend vacationers. The community maintained a steady resort community, but jobs at the resorts were frequently outsourced to white youth in the surrounding areas instead of local African American youth, which caused frustration in the community."

A number of demands for youth programming by local African-American leaders had gone unmet by town leaders in the years leading up to the riots. As one blogger put it, "With the temperature in the high 90’s, no jobs, no hope for jobs, no recreation programs, and no real indication that city fathers were listening to their concerns – the west side youth were frustrated, angry and most likely feeling a sense of hopelessness."

== Events ==
On July 4, 1970, frustration among Black youth on the west side of Asbury Park boiled over. A gathering of unemployed and idle teenagers on the west side turned unruly after a late dance at the West Side Community Center. When some youth began throwing bottles and rocks at each other and at passing cars on Springwood Avenue, police intervened. The arrival of just two officers failed to calm the situation and instead escalated tensions. The crowd, already angered by economic and racial injustice, responded by smashing windows of businesses along Springwood Avenue.

What began as sporadic disturbances over the next few nights soon turned into a sustained and organized uprising. Over the following days the West Side business district was subjected to fires, looting, smashed windows, and broad property destruction. On July 6, city declared a state of emergency, imposed a curfew, and brought in reinforcements including state police and neighboring departments. On July 7, community leaders presented a formal list of twenty demands to city officials, calling for concrete reforms: employment opportunities for Black youth, better housing oversight, a civilian police review board, and fair representation on the Board of Education, among other social and economic reforms.

After the demands were ignored and violence on the streets continued, a confrontation on July 7 turned especially violent as state police opened fire as crowds moved from the West Side toward the railroad tracks that separated the Black neighborhood from the white East Side. Bullets intended as warning shots ricocheted and struck civilians causing 44 civilians, including 14 minors to be wounded. In the aftermath of that incident, violent episodes gradually tapered off. By July 11, 1970, police and state troopers withdrew from their posts on the West Side and the formal “state of emergency” policing presence ended, marking the end of the active unrest period.

== Impacts ==
The civil unrest caused an estimated $4,000,000 in damage, plus an additional $1,600,000 of cleanup costs. In the aftermath, Governor Cahill asked President Nixon to declare the city a disaster area. Many West side residents were displaced from their homes, and the neighborhood continued to be impacted for a number of years after the riots ended.

The riots brought national attention to Asbury Park, New Jersey. The events received extensive coverage, not only in the local papers, but also in the New York Times and on the major television networks. However, they have received relatively little scholarly notice in the years following; in the words of historian Daniel Weeks,

"Some of the reasons for this neglect are obvious. Next to Los Angeles, Detroit, or Newark, where major “race riots” took place in the 1960s, Asbury Park is a small town. Then, too, in Asbury no one died, and historians, who are never immune to the culture in which they live, tend to measure the importance of civil unrest in terms of the death toll. But that is not to say what happened in Asbury is unimportant, particularly to the history of the city itself and to the history of New Jersey. Beyond these considerations, the events in Asbury Park should be remembered as part of what has been called the “Black Revolt” of the 1960s."

== See also ==
- Civil rights movement
- Mass racial violence in the United States
- List of incidents of civil unrest in the United States
