= Lynching of Samuel Bierfield and Lawrence Bowman =

First Jew lynched in the United States

- Location: Franklin, Tennessee, U.S.
- Date: August 15, 1868
- Attack type: Lynching
- Victims: Samuel Bierfield, Lawrence Bowman

Samuel A. Bierfield (died August 15, 1868) is believed to be the first Jew lynched in the United States. Bierfield and his African-American clerk, Lawrence Bowman, were confronted in Bierfield's store in Franklin, Tennessee, and fatally shot on August 15, 1868, by a group of masked men. The killers were believed to belong to a local chapter of the Ku Klux Klan, which had emerged as an insurgent force in the state in 1866. The murder of Bierfield and Bowman was reported by both The New York Times and the Nashville Union and Dispatch.

As was typical in such cases, no one was ever convicted of the crime. One man was arrested for Bierfield's and Bowman's murder but was released by the judge after seven witnesses provided an alibi for him. The lynching followed months of increasing political violence locally the year before, including the July 1867 attacks on Black Union League members in what was called the Franklin Riot. An estimated 25 to 30 Black people were wounded and three died as a result of that incident, together with one White resident.

== Background ==
Racial and political violence had increased in the area during 1867, especially after African Americans were granted the franchise from the state legislature in February 1867. Many former Confederates were still temporarily disenfranchised and resented their loss of political power.

At an Independence Day rally in Franklin on July 6, where Republican candidates John Trimble for Congress and Mr. Elliott for the state senate appeared, Conservative Democrats, who were mostly white but included some blacks, tried to disrupt the Republican meeting. Later that evening, the black Union League Republicans conducted a planned torch light procession in town. They went to the square to disband. There they were ambushed, shot by whites gathered at the opposite corner and from windows. Some "30 [black] Union League veterans were wounded, most of them shot in the side and back. Eight Conservatives, including three blacks, were wounded and one white Conservative, Michael Cody, Jr., was killed." An estimated three blacks among the Union League were mortally wounded. The next day 45th regulars arrived from Nashville and no more immediate violence took place.

== Bierfield/Bowman case ==
A group of masked men appeared at both the rear and front doors of Samuel Bierfield's store. When he refused to open the back door, they broke in. He ran out the front, where he encountered the rest of the group. The masked men shot Bierfield five times. They mortally wounded his Black clerk Lawrence Bowman, who had been with him at the store. Henry Morton, another Black man, had been sitting and chatting with the pair and escaped without injury during the melee. Bierfield pleaded for his life on the street in front of his dry goods store but was shot to death by the masked men at close range.

Following the murders, on August 18, the Nashville Union and Dispatch reported that Bierfield had deserved his "execution", and that the local Jewish community need not fear that this was "a war waged against them". In the style of "blaming the victim", as was typical after lynchings, the newspaper asserted that Bierfield had been a murderer, "among the very few criminals of their nation". Referring to "the letter written by the negro Israel Brown to John Nolin [sic]" (who was also black), which had been publicized before Bierfield was shot, the paper reported that the merchant was implicated in the murder of an innocent man. It said, "It is known that the terrible Ku-Klux Klan had nothing to do with this murderer's execution". The New York Times headlined its report on events as "Murderous outrage in Franklin".

In the letter, the contents of which had been widely publicized in the area, Brown purportedly said that Bierfield had hired Brown and others to murder Jeremiah Ezell, a white farmer who had been killed on July 18. Brown had "escaped". But John Nolan, the supposed recipient of the letter, said that he did not know any Israel Brown.

Captain George Judd and Brevet Lieutenant Colonel Joseph Gelray were dispatched by the Freedmen's Bureau office in Nashville to investigate the case. When they tried to see the letter, they were told by the last holder that it had been lost. Judd and Gelray concluded that the letter was a forgery intended to deflect suspicion from the whites who killed Bierfield and Bowman. “I told him that it was curious he should lose it, and still it should come out in the [newspaper] on the next day,” Judd wrote in his official report of the investigation. “[O.J. Kennedy] said he could not help it, that he lost valuable private papers at the same time.”

Judd believed that Bierfield may have been murdered by one or more rivals because of his relative economic success. He had immigrated from Latvia to Toronto, Canada, where he lived for several years and worked for an uncle. He arrived in Franklin in 1866, one among numerous Jewish immigrants to Tennessee in the late 19th century. By 1867 he had his own store. He competed with a man from the area who had a store on the same block, but Bierfield struggled financially and was planning to leave the town. Another speculation is that the Klan thought he was a Radical Republican, but there is little evidence of political activity. Another view is that he was thought to treat Lawrence Bowman too well.

In September, John Pogue Jr. was arrested and charged with Bierfield's and Bowman's murder, on the strength of eyewitness testimony by Ed Lyle. However, Judge John Hugh Smith released Pogue after seven people came forward providing him with an alibi. The Republican Banner said that Lyle had named Pogue in order to collect the $500 reward offered for information in the case.

== See also ==
- Abraham Surasky
- Leo Frank
- Lynching of American Jews
