= Lynching of Eliza Woods =

1886 lynching death in Jackson, Tennessee

- Location: Jackson, Tennessee, U.S.
- Date: August 19, 1886; 140 years ago
- Target: Eliza Woods
- Attack type: Lynching
- Deaths: 1
- Victim: Eliza Woods

Eliza Woods was an African-American woman who was lynched on 19 August 1886 in Jackson, Tennessee, after being accused of poisoning and killing her employer, Jessie Woolen.

Woods had been Woolen's cook. When it was found that Wooten's stomach contained arsenic and that Woods had a box of rat poison at home, it was concluded that she was responsible for the death. A crowd of 1,000 was reportedly present when Woods was dragged from the jail and hanged naked in front of the courthouse. Bullets were then shot into her body. This lynching was notable both for the gender of the victim and the biracial participation of the crowd. Three years later, in 1889, Woolen's husband allegedly confessed that he had killed his wife. However, the alleged confession was made after he was sent to an insane asylum.

The case was among the first that Ida B. Wells (1862–1931) wrote about before becoming a prominent anti-lynching campaigner.

In 2020, a plaque detailing the lynching was installed at the courthouse where Woods was hanged.

== See also ==
- Lynching of women in the United States
