= Lynching of Native Americans =

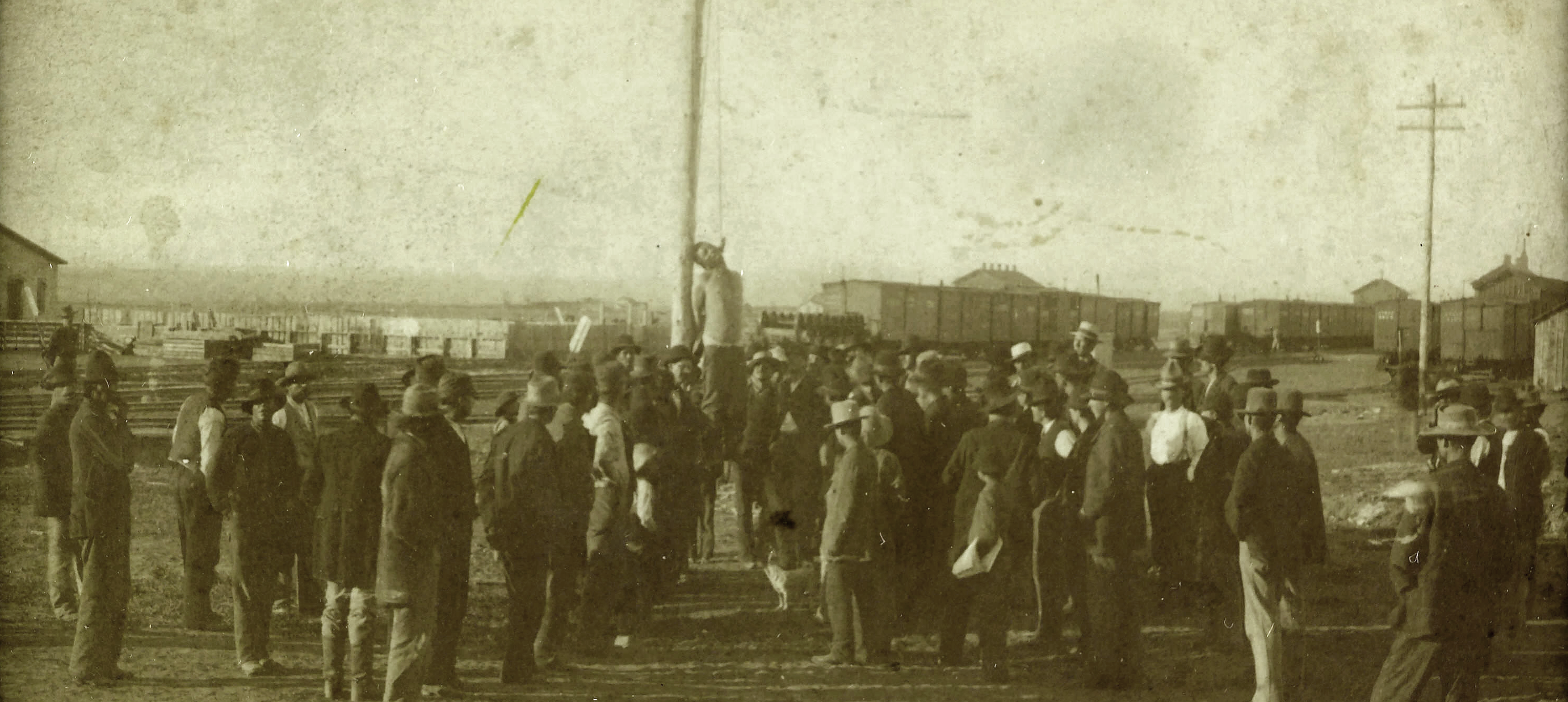
The lynching of José "Navajo Frank" Mares in New Mexico, June 26, 1882.

There are dozens of documented instances of lynchings of Native Americans and at least two documented lynchings of Alaska Natives. Between 1835 and 1964, at least 137 Native American or Alaska Native people were lynched in the United States.

== About ==
Of the over 5,000 documented lynchings in the United States between 1835 and 1964, the large majority were of African Americans. Around 1,000 non-Black people were lynched, including Native Americans, Latinos, whites, and Asian-Americans. 137 deaths were of Native American or Alaska Native people. Historical research into the lynching of Native Americans remains relatively understudied, compared to research on the lynching of African Americans in the American South. Since the publication of W. Fitzhugh Brundage's 1993 work Lynching in the New South: Georgia and Virginia, 1880–1930, renewed scholarship has investigated lynchings of other races and in other regions such as the American West, where many Native Americans were lynched.

== Incidents ==
=== Alaska ===
In July or August of 1883, two Alaska Native men known as Charley Green and Boxer were lynched by hanging in Juneau after being accused of the murder of a rumseller named Richard Rainey.

=== California ===
In April, 1890, a Native American man named Tacho was hanged by a mob after being accused of cattle and horse theft.

=== New Mexico ===
On June 26, 1882, a Navajo Nation man reported as Navajo Frank was lynched in New Mexico. His legal name was José Mares and he used the alias Frank Tafoya. Mares was hanged by a mob after being accused of lassoing and dragging a citizen.

=== North Dakota ===
In November, 1897, three Native American men were lynched in Williamsport, North Dakota. Paul Holytrack, Alex Cadotte, and Phillip Ireland were accused of involvement in the murder of a white family. The three men were abducted from a North Dakota jail by a mob of masked men and hanged.

=== South Dakota ===
On January 18, 1902, a Rosebud Sioux man named John Yellow Wolf was lynched in Deadwood, South Dakota. Yellow Wolf was hanged by a mob after being accused of horse theft.

=== Washington state ===
On February 24, 1884, a fourteen year old Stó꞉lō teenager from British Columbia named Louie Sam (Sumas First Nation) was lynched by an American mob. Sam was accused of the murder of a Washington state shopkeeper named James Bell. The Sumas First Nation turned Sam over to the Canadian authorities to settle the matter. The American mob crossed the Canadian border, abducted Sam from custody, and hanged him. A subsequent investigation by Canadian authorities found Sam innocent of the crime. In 2004, Washington state legislators approved a Senate resolution expressing regret for the lynching of Sam.

=== Wisconsin ===
Sixteen documented lynchings have occurred in Wisconsin, all of whom were accused of murder. Two of the victims were Native Americans.

== See also ==
- Indian rolling
- Lynching of American Jews
- Lynching of Asian Americans
- Lynching of Hispanic and Latino Americans
- Lynching of Italian Americans
- Lynching of white Americans
- Lynching of women in the United States
