= Lynching of American Jews =

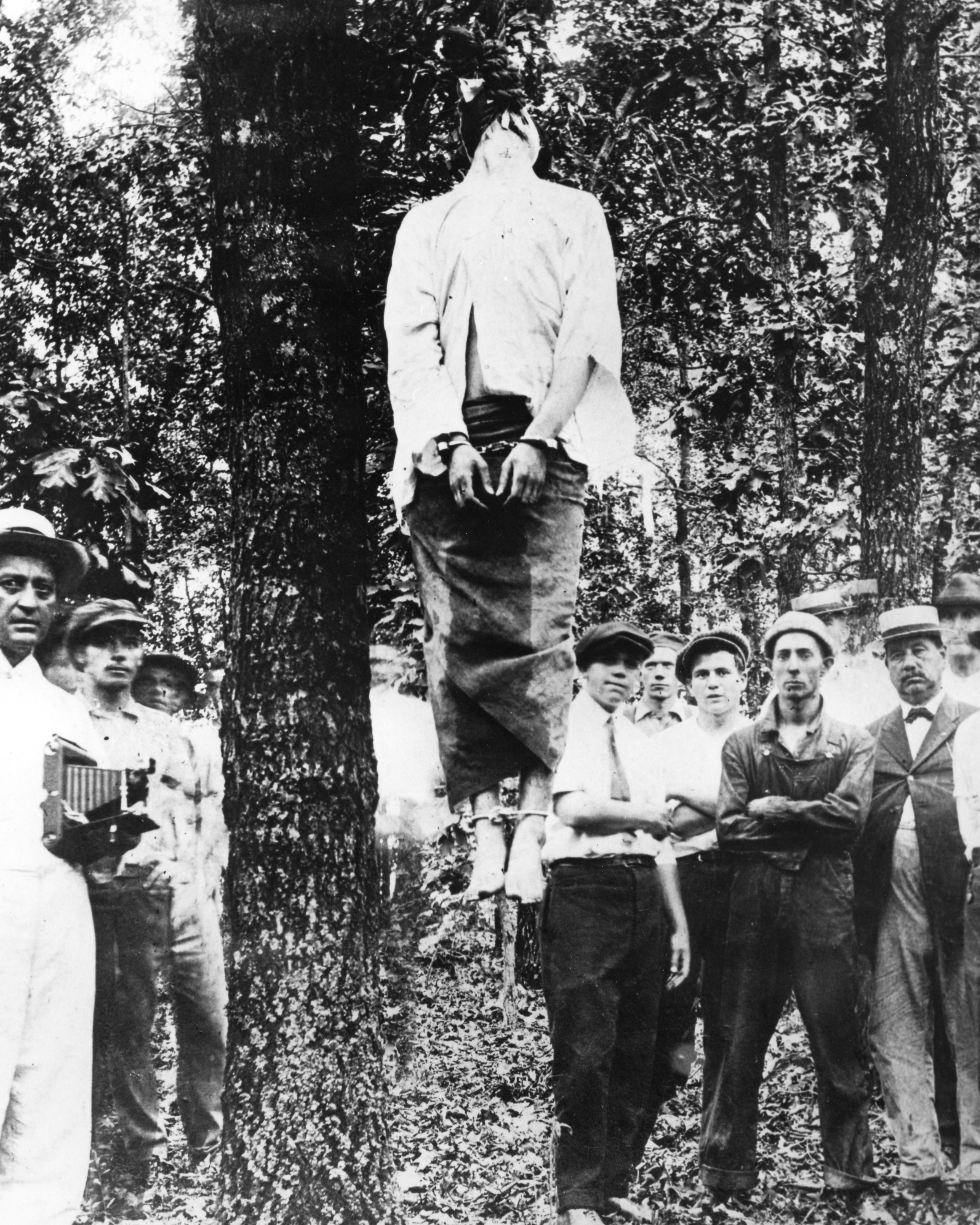
Leo Frank's lynching on the morning of August 17, 1915.

There are multiple recorded incidents of the lynching of American Jews which occurred in the American South between 1868 and 1964. In 1868 in Tennessee, Samuel Bierfield became the first American Jew to be lynched. The lynching of Leo Frank is the most well-known case in American history. The lynching of Frank is commonly believed to be the only lynching of an American Jew, despite the fact that several other well-known lynchings occurred both before and after it.

== History ==
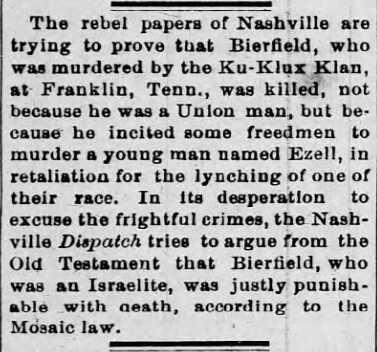
News article in the Muscatine Journal about the lynching of Samuel Bierfield and Lawrence Bowman, August 28, 1868.

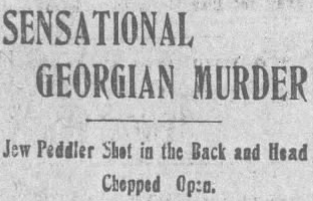
An article in the Evening Courier about the lynching of Abraham Surasky, September 7, 1903.

The vast majority of lynching victims in the United States have been African Americans. Over 4,000 African Americans have been lynched throughout American history. Around 1,000 lynching victims have been white. Among white lynching victims, American Jews, Italian Americans, a German-American, a Finnish-American, and others have been lynched.

On August 15, 1868, the merchant Samuel Bierfield became the first known Jewish victim of a lynching in American history. Bierfield and Lawrence Bowman, his African-American clerk, were lynched by suspected members of the Ku Klux Klan in Franklin, Tennessee.

Leo Frank may not have been the only American Jew who was lynched in the state of Georgia in August 1915. Two days prior to the lynching of Frank, the Jewish writer Albert Bettelheim was lynched on August 15, 1915. No information about the motive for the lynching of Bettelheim is known, other than the fact that he was lynched after he was convicted of murder.

In 1903, the Jewish peddler Abraham Surasky was lynched in rural South Carolina. Several weeks prior to the murder of Surasky, another Jewish peddler survived an attempted lynching.

In 1925, a Jewish peddler named Joseph Needleman was falsely accused of raping Effie Griffin, a 19-year-old white Christian woman from a prominent North Carolina family. A mob, including members of the girl's family, broke into the jail in Williamston, North Carolina and kidnapped him. The leader of the mob castrated Needleman with a knife. Needleman survived the attack, he was absolved by a grand jury, and later, he sued the girl's family in federal court.

On September 23, 1936, the physician and civil rights activist Joseph Gelders was kidnapped and beaten by suspected members of the Ku Klux Klan due to his communist and antiracist activism. The people who assaulted Gelders referred to him as a "damned red" and a "nigger lover". Gelders initially survived the beating, but in 1950, he died of medical complications which he suffered from as a result of the beating.

In June 1964, the Jewish antiracist activists Andrew Goodman and Michael Schwerner, along with the African-American antiracist activist James Chaney, were lynched in Philadelphia, Mississippi.

The total number of American Jews who were lynched is unknown. The African-American historian Tyran Stewart has referred to documentation which pertains to the history of the lynching of American Jews as "incomplete".

== See also ==
- Antisemitism by country#United States
  - Antisemitism in the United States
    - History of antisemitism#United States
      - History of antisemitism in the United States
        - List of antisemitic incidents in the United States
- List of lynching victims in the United States
  - Lynching of Asian Americans
  - Lynching of Hispanic and Latino Americans
  - Lynching of Italian Americans
    - 1891 New Orleans lynchings
  - Lynching of Native Americans
  - Lynching of white Americans
    - Lynching of Olli Kinkkonen
    - Robert Prager
  - Lynching of women in the United States
