= Lynching of white Americans =

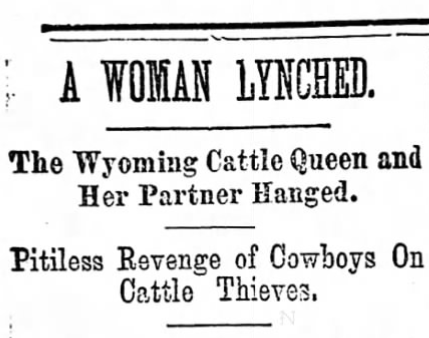
News article about the lynching of Ellen Watson, a White pioneer in the Wild West, August 1889.

There are almost 1,300 recorded instances of the lynching of White Americans, most of which occurred in Western and Southern states during the 1800s and early 1900s. Almost all of these instances were White-on-White lynchings. Victims included people accused of crimes, activists for African-American rights, anti-war activists, immigrants, Italians, Jews, and Mormons. Most victims were men, although some victims were White women and children. Some political commentators have cited the history of the lynching of White Americans to falsely claim that White people were equally victimized by lynching or to deny the racial nature of lynching in American history, which overwhelmingly targeted African-Americans and other non-White minorities, including Asian, Latino, and Native Americans. Estimates for the number of White lynchings vary, as some surveys have included some Latino, Asian, and Native American victims as "White". Ethnic groups that experienced discrimination, including Jews and Italians, are also typically classified as White lynching victims in lynching research. Compared to the lynching of African-Americans, the lynching of White Americans was typically less brutal, less ritualized, and less likely to involve a public audience, burning, torture, mutilation, and decapitation.,

== History ==
The Tuskegee Institute estimates that 1,297 Whites were lynched between 1882 and 1968. According to the NAACP, some White lynching victims were lynched because of their anti-lynching activism or for otherwise being supportive of Black Americans. Lynchings of White Americans were most common in regions like the American West and Appalachia, much of which was tied to the lawlessness of those regions and the presence of vigilantism. White people involved in animal herding sometimes were lynched over conflicts about property. The author and professor Gianluca De Fazio has written that White lynching victims have been over-counted in places such as Virginia. According to De Fazio, "lynching apologists often used White lynching victims to defend lethal mob violence arguing that, rather than a tool of White domination, lynching was a legitimate and non-racialized form of "popular justice" against hideous crimes."

In 1909, the journalist and anti-lynching activist Ida B. Wells wrote that two different lynching "regimes" had operated in the United States; one in the South that overwhelmingly targeted African-Americans and one in the Wild West frontier region that most often targeted Whites. Wells wrote that "[W]hile frontier lynch law existed, [lynchings] showed a majority of White victims. Later, however, as law courts and authorized judiciary extended into the far West, lynch law rapidly abated and its White victims became few and far between. Just as the lynch law regime came to a close in the West, a new mob movement started in the South."

African-American lynching victims outnumbered White lynching victims 4 to 1 in the late 1800s. After 1900 the ratio increased to 17 to 1. White lynching victims were almost always lynched by other White people. Of 151 recorded examples of Black lynching mobs documented by the Historical American Lynching (HAL) Project, most victims were also Black and only 4 were White.

The Equal Justice Initiative notes that lynchings of White Americans were typically less brutal and ritualistic compared to the lynchings of Black Americans, which "often featured extreme brutality such as burning, torture, mutilation, and decapitation of the victim." Lynchings of African-Americans were often ritualized public spectacles with extreme violence, whereas White lynching victims were often quietly hanged without mutilation or a public audience.

According to the Jim Crow Museum of Racist Memorabilia, White people were the majority of both lynching victims and lynching perpetrators during the mid-1800s, but following the Civil War, Black Americans quickly became the overwhelming majority of lynching victims.

According to the American Lynching database, several states have no recorded lynchings of people of any race, including Connecticut, Massachusetts, New Hampshire, and Rhode Island. Delaware has no recorded incidents of White people being lynched. Maine, New Jersey, New York, and Vermont each have one recorded incident of a White person being lynched. 2 White people were lynched in both Maryland and Pennsylvania. States with 10 or fewer lynchings of White people include 6 in Utah, 5 in Minnesota, 7 in Michigan, 6 in Nevada, 10 in Ohio, 4 in South Carolina, and 6 in Wisconsin. The states with the highest recorded number of White lynching victims include 48 in Alabama, 31 in Arizona, 58 in Arkansas, 41 in California, 65 in Colorado, 25 in Florida, 39 in Georgia, 20 in Idaho, 15 in Illinois, 33 in Indiana, 17 in Iowa, 35 in Kansas, 63 in Kentucky, 56 in Louisiana, 42 in Mississippi, 53 in Missouri, 82 in Montana, 52 in Nebraska, 33 in New Mexico, 82 in Oklahoma, 20 in Oregon, 27 in South Dakota, 13 in North Dakota, 15 in North Carolina, 47 in Tennessee, 25 in Washington, 17 in Virginia, 20 in West Virginia, and 30 in Wyoming. The state with the most recorded lynchings of White people is Texas at 141 people.

The exact number of White people who were lynched in the United States can vary depending on how "White" is defined. According to the American Lynching database, the Tuskegee Institute divided lynching victims into Black and non-Black, with some "White" victims being Mexican, Chinese, Native American, or belonging to other racial and ethnic minorities that White Anglo lynching mobs did not consider White. Other victims classified as White in statistics were from Italian, Jewish, or European immigrant backgrounds and experienced discrimination from White Anglo-Saxon Protestants. Scholars generally agree that members of these non-Anglo-Saxon groups experienced discrimination, but disagree over whether these groups were considered White. According to the researchers David Rigby and Charles Seguin, non-Anglo-Saxon Whites were lynched at similar rates to native-born Anglo-Saxon Whites. Rigby and Seguin stated that "European immigrants were lynched at similar rates to native Whites, far less often than blacks, and generally without the ritual spectacle that black victims often suffered." Among Southern Europeans, Italians were the only ethnic group to experience lynching.

In colonial and revolutionary Virginia, in the absence of formal law enforcement, Whites were sometimes lynched as an extrajudicial punishment for crime. Some of the White lynching victims were murdered for being Loyalists.

In the American South, White lynching victims accused of violent crime were mostly accused of murder. Only a small number were accused of rape. By contrast, African-American male lynching victims were frequently accused of rape.

The sole recorded lynching in the history of Maine was the 1873 lynching of James Cullen, a White American of Irish-Canadian Protestant heritage.

Between 1885 and 1930, 77 White people were lynched in Oklahoma, generally due to being suspected of crimes including robbery and cattle and horse theft. Most White victims were hanged; none were burned. 71 of these White people were lynched between 1885 and 1907, making up the majority of victims in Oklahoma during that time.

In 1918, the Finnish immigrant Olli Kinkkonen was lynched in Duluth, Minnesota, due to his opposition to World War I.

In 1940, Kentucky Senator Kenneth McKellar submitted testimony to Congress stating that 160 White people were lynched in 1884, but since then the lynching of White people had gradually decreased, with the last recorded lynching of a White person happening in 1936.

The denial of the racist nature of lynching has featured in segregationist rhetoric. In 1948 at a Judiciary Subcommittee on the Crime of Lynching, the segregationist Mississippi Senator James Eastland questioned whether lynching was a racist phenomenon, responding to a statement that "the purpose of lynching is designed to suppress a particular portion of the population" by stating, "Is that true? You have White men who are lynched for it, as many in proportion as commit the crime."

James Allen's 2000 book Without Sanctuary: Lynching Photography in America includes several photographs of White lynching victims.

In 2019, the Republican Colorado State Representative Lori Saine made headlines for falsely claiming that White and Black Americans were lynched in equal numbers in the years following the Civil War due to their political affiliations.

In 2019, following Donald Trump's claim that the impeachment process against him was a "lynching", Newt Gingrich told the hosts of The View that he did not view lynching as a purely racist phenomenon, saying that he would be "very politically incorrect" by asserting that "Most of the early American movies on lynching were about lynching White people. One of the largest lynchings of the 19th century was Italians. So, there is a tradition here. It's not only about black experience."

== List of white American lynching victims ==
=== White men ===
- Big Nose George - 1881, Wyoming
- Joseph Vermillion - 1889, Maryland
- Wesley Everest - 1919, Washington state

=== White women ===
- Kit Kelly - 1888, Texas
- Ellen Watson - 1889, Wyoming
- Sallie Molena and daughter - 1890, Texas
- Nancy Jane Crocker - 1895, Texas
- Peb Falls (reported, but unconfirmed) - 1897, Virginia
- Viola Liuzzo - 1965, Alabama

== See also ==
- Lynching of American Jews
- Lynching of Asian Americans
- Lynching of Hispanic and Latino Americans
- Lynching of Italian Americans
- Lynching of Native Americans
- Lynching of Peb Falls
- Lynching of women in the United States
