= Lynching of Italian Americans =

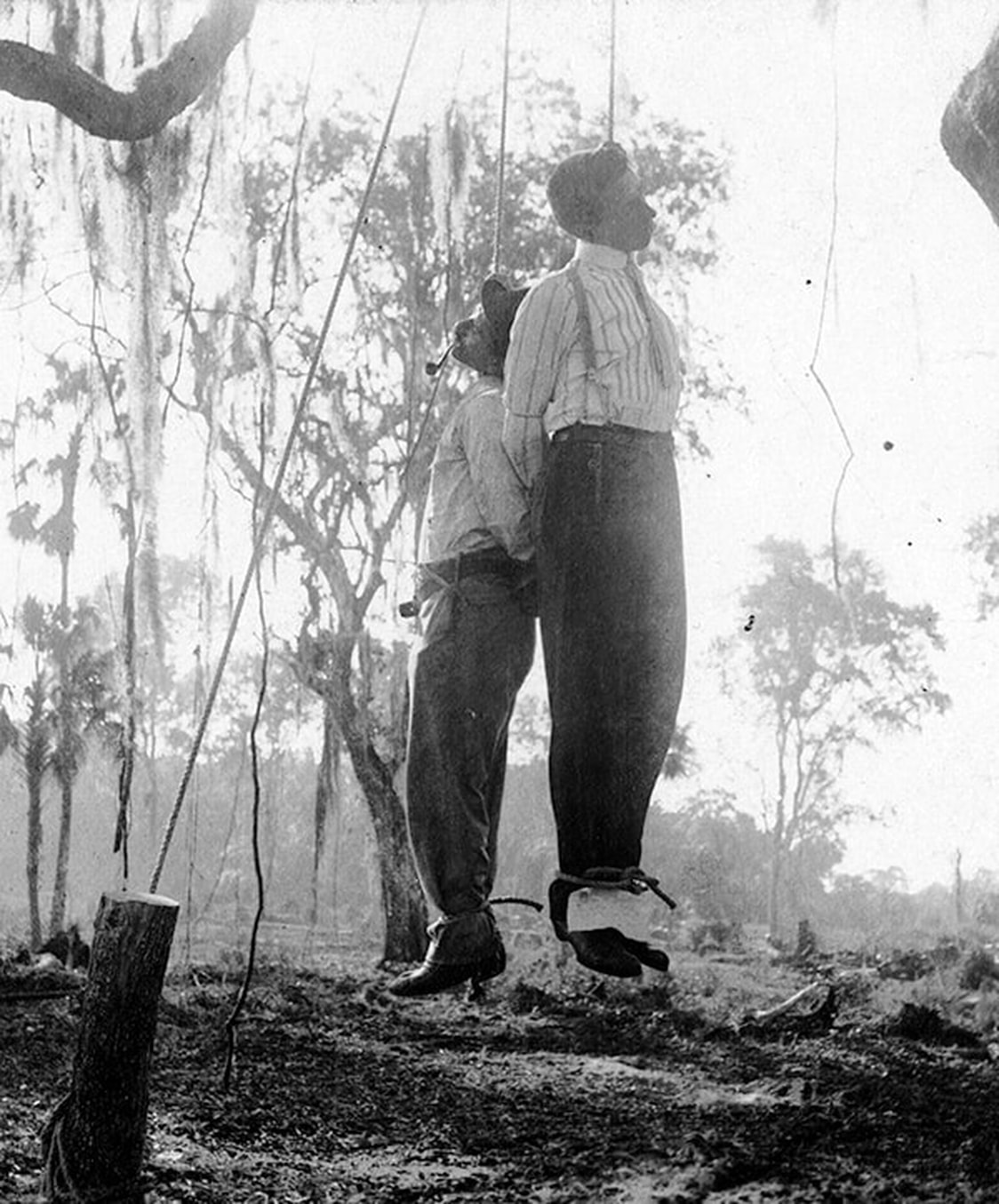
Lynching of Castenego Ficarrotta and Angelo Albano in Tampa, Florida, on September 9, 1910.

There are multiple recorded instances of the lynching of Italian Americans, most notably the 1891 New Orleans lynchings, one of the largest mass lynchings in US history. Between 1880 and 1921, there have been at least 50 documented cases of Italians being lynched in 9 states. While the vast majority of lynching victims during the late 1800s and early 1900s were African Americans, Italians were lynched in higher numbers compared to some other immigrant groups.

== About ==
The majority of lynching victims in the United States have been African Americans. Over 4,000 African Americans have been lynched in American history. Around 1,000 lynching victims have been white. Among white lynching victims, American Jews, Italian Americans, a German-American, a Finnish-American, and others have been lynched. Some Mexican-Americans, Asian-Americans, and Native Americans were also lynched. Between 1880 and 1921, there were over 50 documented cases of Italian Americans being lynched in 9 states including Florida, Louisiana, Illinois, New York, Mississippi, Arizona, Colorado, Kentucky, and Washington state.

== Incidents ==
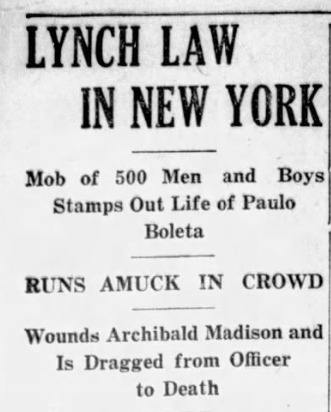
A news article in The Republican of Springfield, Massachusetts, about the lynching of Paulo Boleta, December 14, 1916.

=== Colorado ===
In 1895, five Italians were lynched in Colorado by vigilantes after they had been convicted of the murder of a saloon keeper.

=== Florida ===
Two Italian men were lynched in Tampa, Florida in 1910. The two men, Castenego Ficarrotta and Angelo Albano, were handcuffed together and hanged in a swamp. Ficarrotta was a naturalized citizen. The Italian Embassy released a statement in the wake of the lynching stating that Albano was an Italian citizen.

=== Kentucky ===
An Italian male, Louis Laferdetta, was lynched by hanging in Boone County, Kentucky, on July 17, 1894. He was lynched after being accused of murdering a farmer.

=== Louisiana ===
In 1899, all five Italians living in Tallulah, Louisiana were lynched.

In 1901, a mob chased four Italians out of Marksville, Louisiana.

=== Mississippi ===
Two attempted or completed lynchings of Italians occurred in Mississippi in 1901. A mob attacked a group of Italians and another mob lynched an Italian in Erwin, Mississippi, and a mob chased four Italians out of Marksville, Louisiana.

== See also ==
- Lynching of American Jews
- Lynching of Asian Americans
- Lynching of Hispanic and Latino Americans
- Lynching of Native Americans
- Lynching of Olli Kinkkonen
- Lynching of white Americans
- Lynching of women in the United States
- Robert Prager
