= Lynching of Hispanic and Latino Americans =

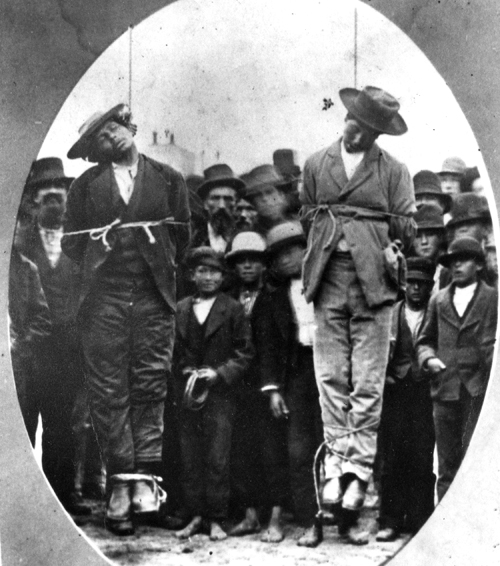
In 1877, Francisco Arias and José Chamales were lynched in Santa Cruz, California. The image was used as the cover for Alfredo Mirandé's book Gringo Injustice (2019).

There are multiple recorded incidents of the lynching of Hispanics and Latinos in the United States, which mostly occurred in states of the American West during the late 1800s and early 1900s. Most victims were of Mexican or Spanish descent. Lynch mobs murdered Hispanic and Latino Americans in at least 14 states: Arizona, California, Colorado, Florida, Kentucky, Louisiana, Montana, Nevada, New Mexico, Nebraska, Oklahoma, Oregon, Texas and Wyoming. White Anglo mobs lynched or massacred between several hundred to several thousand Mexican-Americans, Chicanos, Hispanos, and Tejanos in the Southwest, especially during a period in Texas between 1910 and 1920 known as La Matanza (The Massacre).

== About ==
The majority of lynchings between 1835 and 1964 were of African Americans. However, several hundred or possibly several thousands of Hispanic and Latino Americans were lynched during this time period. Most were Mexican-Americans, Chicanos, and Tejanos living in the American Southwest. The states with the most lynchings of Latinos were Texas, California, New Mexico, and Arizona. Smaller numbers occurred in other Western and Southern states such as Colorado, Kentucky, Louisiana, Montana, Nebraska, Nevada, Oklahoma, Oregon and Wyoming. At least one Spanish-American of Canarian descent was lynched in Florida.

The ethnic identity of lynching victims was often ignored in studies of lynching and the death certificates of victims listed them as either white or black. Around 150 people of Mexican descent were lynched in the United States in the decade after the Treaty of Guadalupe Hidalgo. A 2004 study by William Carrigan and Clive Webb found that at least 571 Mexicans were lynched in the United States from 1848 and 1928, with 20% of these occurring in the 1920s.

The historian Alfredo Torres Jr. has estimated that over 871 Hispanics and Latinos were lynched in 13 States of the West and Southwest after the Civil War, with the largest number happening in Southern Texas. The historians Clive Webb and William D. Carrigan have estimated that as many as 5,000 Hispanics and Latinos were lynched between 1910 and 1920. According to Carrigan and Webb, lynchings of Mexicans persisted into the 1920s, eventually declining due to pressure from the Mexican government.

== Incidents ==
=== California ===
There are 143 documented cases of Latinos being lynched in California between 1849 and 1928. Victims were primarily Mexican-Americans and Mexican citizens. Latinos were the primary group of people lynched in California.

=== Colorado ===
Over 160 people were lynched in Colorado between 1859 and 1919, most of whom were Mexican or Black.

=== Louisiana ===
Charlie Williams, a Mexican man, was lynched by a mob in West Carroll Parish in November 1894. Williams was lynched after being accused of robbery and murder.

Michael "Mike" Rodriguez, a white Mexican man, was lynched in October 1909 in Slabtown, Louisiana. Rodriguez was lynched by a mob after being accused of robbery.

=== Nebraska ===
Two Mexican men were lynched by mobs in Nebraska between 1878 and 1919.

A Mexican man, Luciano Padilla of New Mexico, was lynched in Cheese Creek, Nebraska, in August 1884. Padilla was hanged by a mob after he was accused of rape.

A Mexican man, Juan Gonzales, was lynched in the vicinity of Scribner, Nebraska, in February 1915. He was murdered by a lynch mob of around 200 people after he was accused of murdering an Omaha police officer.

=== Oregon ===
A Mexican man was lynched by a mob in Auburn, Oregon in December, 1862. News accounts referred to the victim as "Tom the Spaniard" or "Spanish Tom". Another Mexican man was lynched the same day for attempting to prevent the lynching of Tom.

=== Montana ===
The Montana Vigilantes lynched a Mexican man named Joe Pizanthia in January, 1864, in Bannack, Montana. Pizanthia was shot by the vigilantes after being accused of murder.

=== Nevada ===
A Mexican man, Louis Ortiz, was lynched by a mob in Reno, Nevada, in September 1891. Ortiz was hanged by the mob after being accused of shooting a police officer.

=== Texas ===
Texas law enforcement conducted numerous lynchings during the Mexican Border War. In 1915, at least 500 Mexicans were murdered by the Texas Ranger Division in the La Hora de Sangre (Hour of Blood).

Texas has the highest number of documented lynchings of Hispanics and Latinos of any state.

La Matanza (1910–1920) was a period of anti-Hispanic violence in Texas in response to the Bandit War along the US-Mexico border. The Bandit War happened during the Mexican Revolution, when ethnic/racial conflict was intensifying between Hispanic landowners and newer white Anglo settlers. Hundreds or possibly thousands of Mexicans and Tejanos were murdered by lynch mobs and riots.

=== Wyoming ===
A Mexican man named Gus Kernwood was lynched by a mob in Stinking Water Creek, Wyoming, in December, 1886.

== See also ==
- Gringo justice
- La Matanza (1910–1920)
- Lynching of American Jews
- Lynching of Asian Americans
- Lynching of Italian Americans
- Lynching of Native Americans
- Lynching of white Americans

== Works cited ==
- Villanueva Jr., Nicholas (2017). The Lynching of Mexicans in the Texas Borderlands. University of New Mexico Press. ISBN 9780826358387.
