= Lynching of Asian Americans =

There are multiple recorded incidents of the lynching of Asian Americans throughout US history, which mostly occurred in states in the American West during the late 1800s and early 1900s. Most of the victims of those lynchings were Chinese and at least one victim was Japanese. The Los Angeles Chinese massacre of 1871 was one of the largest mass lynchings in American history. Other mass lynchings of Asian Americans in the American West include the 1885 Rock Springs massacre in Wyoming, the 1885 attack on Squak Valley Chinese laborers in Washington state, and the 1887 Hells Canyon massacre in Oregon. Lynch mobs or riots murdered Asian Americans in at least 9 states: California, Colorado, Hawaii, Idaho, Nevada, Oregon, Utah, Washington state, and Wyoming.

== About ==
Of the over 5,000 documented lynchings in the United States between 1835 and 1964, the large majority of them were lynchings of African Americans. Around 1,000 non-Black people were lynched, including Asian-Americans, Latinos, whites, and Native Americans. The lynching of Asian Americans mostly occurred in Western states, as part of a broader wave of violence against Asians in the West. The history of anti-Asian lynching has historically been understudied, but it has received renewed attention in recent years.

=== Colorado ===
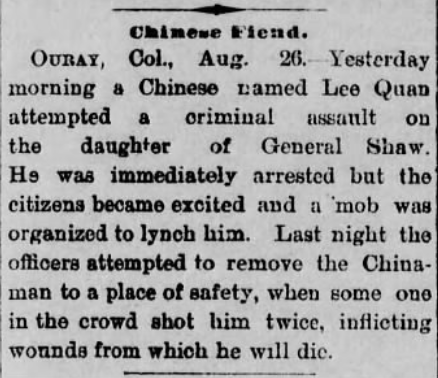
News article in the Merced County Sun about the lynching of Lee Quan, August 26, 1891.

During the 1880 race riot in Denver, Chinatown was destroyed by a mob and one Chinese man named Look Young was hanged.

A Chinese man, Lee Quan, was lynched by a mob in Ouray, Colorado, in August of 1891. Quan was accused of assaulting the daughter of General Shaw. Authorities attempted to remove Quan to safety, but he was shot to death by members of the mob.

=== Hawaii ===
A Japanese merchant named Katsu Goto was lynched by a mob in Hawaii in 1889. Accused of arson, Goto was hanged from a telephone pole.

=== Idaho ===
Five Chinese men were lynched by a mob in Pierce City, Idaho, in September, 1885. The men were accused of murder and hanged. The Chinese government was angered by the lynching and demanded reparations. The Idaho territorial governor Edward A. Stevenson investigated the murder, but concluded that the men were guilty. None of the perpetrators were ever charged for the murders.

=== Nevada ===
One Chinese man was lynched by a mob during an anti-Chinese riot in Tonopah, Nevada, in September of 1903. 66-year-old Chinese immigrant Chong Bing Long, the owner of a laundromat, was robbed and beaten. The mob then drove him into the desert, beat him again, and left him to die. Several survivors of the mob sustained serious injuries.

=== Utah ===
Ah Sing, a Chinese man, was lynched by a mob in Corinne, Utah, in April, 1874. Sing was accused of murder and arrested. A mob abducted Sing from the jail and marched him to a railroad bridge where he was hanged.

== See also ==
- Lynching#United States
  - Lynching in the United States
    - Lynching of American Jews
    - Lynching of Hispanic and Latino Americans
    - Lynching of Italian Americans
    - Lynching of Native Americans
    - Lynching of white Americans
    - Lynching of women in the United States
