= Timeline of Cincinnati =

Inexhaustive list of key events in the history of Cincinnati, Ohio

Coordinates: 39.100°N 84.517°W

The following is a timeline of the history of the city of Cincinnati, Ohio, USA.

== Prior to 19th century ==
- 1788 - Losantiville settled.
- 1789 - Fort Washington built.
- 1790 - Losantiville renamed "Cincinnati."
- 1791 - First Presbyterian Society formed.
- 1793 - Centinel of the North-Western Territory newspaper begins publication.
- 1795 - Treaty of Greenville
- 1799 - Western Spy, and Hamilton Gazette newspaper begins publication.

== 19th century ==
- 1802 - David Ziegler becomes mayor.
- 1804 - Methodist Episcopal Society founded.
- 1810 - Population: 2,540.
- 1811 - New Jerusalem Society instituted.
- 1813 - Society of Friends formed.
- 1814
  - Circulating Library Society of Cincinnati founded.
  - German Christian Society instituted.
  - Treaty of Greenville (1814)
- 1817
  - Cincinnati Bell, Brass and Iron Foundry established.
  - Methodist Episcopal Church incorporated.
  - Episcopal Society organized.
  - Female Association for the Benefit of Africans formed.
- 1818
  - Western Museum Society instituted.
  - Roman Catholic Society organized.
  - Population: 9,120.
  - Letton's Museum opens.
- 1819
  - Cincinnati College founded.
  - Liberty Hall and Cincinnati Gazette newspaper begins publication.
  - Haydn Society instituted.
  - Cincinnati Medical Society established.
- 1821 - Apprentices' Library founded.
- 1822 - Jewish congregation established.
- 1825 - Cincinnati Steam Paper Mill established.
- 1826
  - Cathedral Basilica of St. Peter in Chains first built.
  - Cincinnati Type Foundry in operation.
  - Cincinnati Colonization Society organized.
- 1827 - Cincinnati Time Store established.
- 1828 - Fanny Trollope's bazaar in business.
- 1829
  - Lane Theological Seminary established.
  - Cincinnati riots of 1829; ethnic whites attack blacks
- 1834
  - Cincinnati receives national attention for the debates on slavery held over 18 evenings in February (see Lane Theological Seminary#The slavery debates).
- 1835
  - Young Men's Mercantile Library opens.
  - First bag of airmail, which was lifted by a hot air balloon
- 1836
  - The Philanthropist (Cincinnati, Ohio) and German/English-language Volksblatt begin publication.
  - Cincinnati riots of 1836; whites attack blacks
- 1839 - Ohio Mechanics' Institute fair held.
- 1840 - Society for the Promotion of Useful Knowledge organized.
- 1841 - Cincinnati riots of 1841; whites attack blacks
- 1843 - Whitewater Canal built.
- 1844 - Cincinnati Historical Society organized.
- 1847
  - Strobridge Lithography Company in business.
  - First Jewish hospital in the United States opens
- 1848 - Turners' Library in operation.
- 1849
  - First city in the U.S. to hold a municipal song festival, named Saengerfest
  - Historical and Philosophical Society of Ohio relocates to Cincinnati.
  - Carthage Road Cemetery founded.
- 1850
  - Cincinnati Volksfreund begins publication.
  - First city in the U.S. where a Jewish hospital was founded
  - Population: 115,435.
- 1851 - J. P. Ball photography studio and gallery in operation.
- 1852 - Convention of Colored Freemen held.
- 1853
  - Cincinnati riot of 1853; anti-Catholic riot
  - First practical steam fire engine. First city to establish a municipal fire department and first fire pole.
- 1854 - Mendenhall's Circulating Library in operation.
- 1855 - Cincinnati riots of 1855; whites attacked German-Americans
- 1856 - Ehrgott & Forbriger established.
- 1858 - Daily Penny Press begins publication.
- 1859 - The first horse-drawn streetcars are introduced.
- 1865 - Isaac M. Wise Temple (Plum Street Temple) built.
- 1866 - John A. Roebling Suspension Bridge opened.
- 1867
  - Public Library established.
  - Cincinnati Conservatory of Music founded.
- 1869
  - Cincinnati Reds founded
  - First weather bureau.
- 1870
  - First municipal university - the University of Cincinnati
  - First city to hold annual industrial expositions
  - Population: 216,239.
- 1871 - Tyler Davidson Fountain dedicated.
- 1872
  - Cincinnati Bar Association established.
  - Cincinnati Orchestra founded.
  - Newport Southbank Bridge opened.
- 1873
  - Wielert's built.
  - The May Festival Chorus debuts
- 1875
  - Hebrew Union College, the first Jewish theological school, was established.
  - Cincinnati Zoo and Botanical Garden opens.
- 1876 - 1876 Republican National Convention
- 1877 - Cincinnati Southern Railway begins operating.
- 1878 - Cincinnati Music Hall built.
- 1880
  - 1880 Democratic National Convention
  - Population: 255,139.
- 1883 - Old St. Luke's Episcopal Church founded.
- 1884 - Cincinnati riots of 1884
- 1885 - Cincinnati Stock Exchange founded.
- 1887 - Saint Francis De Sales Catholic Church consecrated.
- 1888 - City hosts Centennial Exposition of the Ohio Valley and Central States.

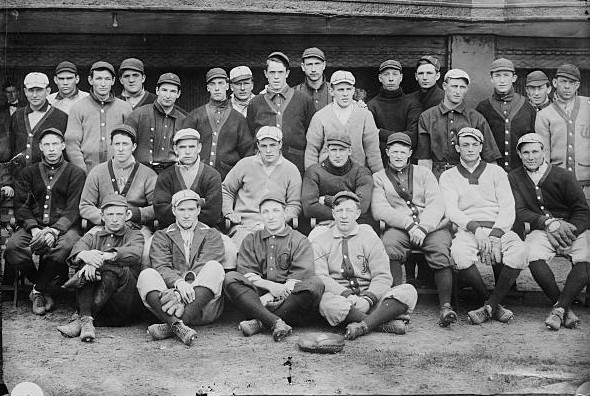
Cincinnati Reds baseball team in 1909

- 1889
  - The Cincinnati Red Stockings leave the American Association on November 14, joining the National League along with the Brooklyn Bridegrooms after a dispute with St. Louis Browns owner Chris Von Der Ahe over the selection of a new league president.
  - Cincinnati Milling Machine Company incorporated.
  - Cincinnati streetcar system begins operating electric streetcars.
- 1890
  - Cincinnati–Newport Bridge opened.
  - Population: 296,908.
- 1895 - Cincinnati Symphony Orchestra founded.
- 1896 - Business Men's Club of Cincinnati incorporated.
- 1897 - John A. Roebling Suspension Bridge re-built and enlarged.

== 20th century ==
- 1900 - Population: 325,902.
- 1902 - First reinforced concrete skyscraper - the Ingalls Building.
- 1905 - U.S. premier of Mahler's Symphony No. 5.
- 1906 - First university to offer cooperative education, University of Cincinnati.
- 1909 - Evening School for Foreigners opens.
- 1911 - Mount Airy Forest established.
- 1912
  - Labor Advocate newspaper begins publication.
  - 1912, the Cincinnati Reds opened a new steel-and-concrete ballpark, Redland Field (later known as Crosley Field).
- 1914 - Martha, the last passenger pigeon, dies at the Cincinnati Zoo.
- 1916 - 9th Street YMCA opens.

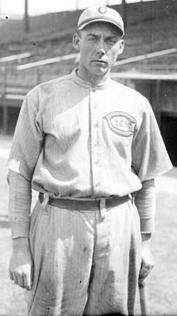
Hall of famer Edd Roush led Cincinnati to the 1919 World Series.

- 1920
  - Cincinnati Subway breaks ground
  - Cincinnati Opera begins.
  - Population: 401,247.
- 1926 - Cincinnati, Hamilton and Dayton Railway (1926–1930) in operation.
- 1928 - LeBlond Aircraft Engine Corporation established. Cincinnati Subway cancelled.
- 1930
  - Population: 451,160
  - Cincinnati and Lake Erie Railroad in operation.
- 1932 - Lane Theological Seminary closed.
- 1933 - Cincinnati Union Terminal opens.
- 1937
  - Ohio River flood of 1937
  - Cincinnati Bengals (1937–41)
- 1940 - Population: 455,610
- 1950 - Population:503,998
- 1951 - Last line of the Cincinnati streetcar system is abandoned.
- 1952 - First heart-lung machine- makes open heart surgery possible. Developed at Cincinnati Children's Hospital Medical Center.
- 1954 - First licensed public television station, WCET.
- 1960 - Population: 502,550.
- 1967 - Race riot in Avondale.
- 1968 - Riot in Avondale following the assassination of Martin Luther King.

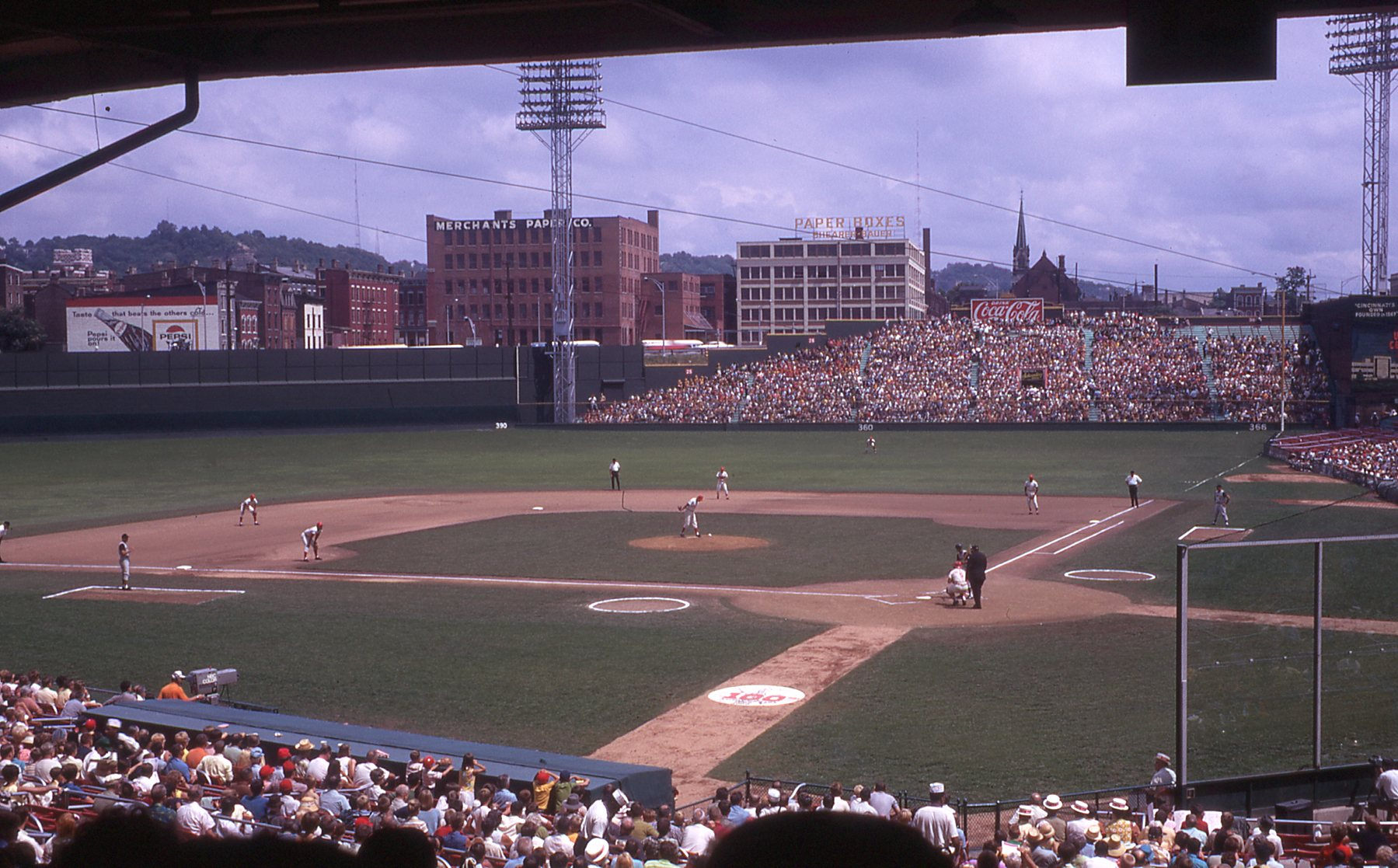
The Reds played at Crosley Field, pictured here in 1969, from 1912 to 1970.

- 1977 - Annual convention of the National Rifle Association of America held in city. The "Revolt at Cincinnati" saw a radical new leadership elected, shifting the NRA's focus from hunting and marksmanship towards political action and the right to bear arms.
- 1978 - Great Blizzard of 1978
- 1979 - 1979 The Who concert disaster
- 1983 - Air Canada Flight 797 accident
- 1987 - Sister city relationship established with Munich, Germany.
- 1988 - Sister city relationships established with Gifu, Gifu, Japan and Liuzhou, China.
- 1989 - Sister city relationship established with Kharkiv, Ukraine.
- 1990
  - Cincinnati Museum Center at Union Terminal opens.
  - Cincinnati History Museum opens.
  - Population: 364,040.
  - Sister city relationship established with Harare, Zimbabwe.
- 1991 - Sister city relationship established with Nancy, France.
- 1992 - Cincinnati–Newport Bridge demolished.
- 1994 - Sister city relationship established with New Taipei, Taiwan.
- 1998 - City website online (approximate date).
- 1999 - April 1999 Cincinnati tornado

== 21st century ==
- 2000
  - Population: 331,285.
  - Paul Brown Stadium opens as the new home of the Cincinnati Bengals.
  - Cintas Center opens as the new home of Xavier University's basketball and volleyball teams.
- 2001 - Cincinnati riots of 2001.
- 2003 – Great American Ball Park opens as the new home of the Cincinnati Reds.
- 2005 – Mark Mallory becomes mayor.
- 2011 – The annual rivalry game between the men's basketball teams of the city's two NCAA Division I schools, the University of Cincinnati and Xavier University, ends in a bench-clearing brawl.
- 2012 - Sister city relationship established with Mysore, India.
- 2014 – A basketball game between the women's teams of the local Mount St. Joseph University and Northeast Ohio school Hiram College, focusing on terminally ill MSJ player Lauren Hill, becomes a national event, eventually receiving an ESPY Award in 2015.
- 2016
  - On May 28, a three-year-old boy climbed into the gorilla habitat at the Cincinnati Zoo and was subsequently grabbed and dragged by Harambe, a 17-year-old western lowland gorilla. Afraid for the boy's life, zoo officials made the decision to shoot and kill Harambe. Sparking much controversy, the incident quickly became known internationally.
  - The Cincinnati Bell Connector streetcar system opens.
  - FC Cincinnati begins play in the United Soccer League.
- 2017 – On January 24, a Nile hippopotamus that would be named Fiona was born at the Cincinnati Zoo six weeks prematurely at about half the normal birth weight for her species. During the zoo's successful attempt to save her, it posted regular social media updates on her progress, and she became the zoo's biggest attraction and a worldwide Internet celebrity.
- 2018 – On May 29, Major League Soccer announced that FC Cincinnati would move from the USL to MLS effective with the 2019 season.
- 2019
  - March 3 – FC Cincinnati made its MLS debut, losing 4–1 at Seattle Sounders FC.
  - March 17 – FC Cincinnati made its MLS home debut, winning 3–0 over the Portland Timbers.
- 2021 – The new home of FC Cincinnati, TQL Stadium opens on May 16.
- 2022 – On August 11, the Cincinnati FBI field office attack occurs.

== See also ==
- History of Cincinnati
- List of mayors of Cincinnati
- Timeline of Newport, Kentucky, in vicinity of Cincinnati

Other cities in Ohio

- Timeline of Cleveland
- Timeline of Columbus, Ohio
- Timeline of Toledo, Ohio

== Bibliography ==
=== Published in the 19th century ===
- The Cincinnati directory for 1819, Cincinnati: Oliver Farnsworth, 1819, OCLC 825332, OL 24467536M
- B. Drake & E.D. Mansfield (1827). Cincinnati in 1826. Morgan, Lodge, and Fisher.
- "Cincinnati", American Advertising Directory, for Manufacturers and Dealers in American Goods, New York: Jocelyn, Darling & Co., 1831, OCLC 1018684
- W. G. Lyford (1837), "Cincinnati, (Ohio,) in 1837", The Western Address Directory, Baltimore: Printed by J. Robinson
- Charles Cist (1841), Cincinnati in 1841: its early annals and future prospects, Cincinnati: Printed and pub. for the author, OL 23355233M
- The Cincinnati business directory for the year 1844, Cincinnati: R. P. Brooks, 1844, OL 24365644M
- "Cincinnati". Kimball & James' Business Directory for the Mississippi Valley. Cincinnati: Printed by Kendall & Barnard. 1844. hdl:2027/chi.20799213 – via HathiTrust.
- Williams' Cincinnati Directory. Cincinnati: Williams & Company. 1862.
  - 1856
  - 1860, 1861, 1862
  - 1870, 1878
- "Ohio River: Cincinnati". James' River Guide ... Mississippi Valley. Cincinnati: U.P. James. 1860. hdl:2027/nyp.33433081817672.
- "Cincinnati, O.". Commercial Gazetteer and Business Directory of the Ohio River. Indianapolis: G.W. Hawes. 1861.
- Geo. E. Stevens (1869), The city of Cincinnati: a summary of its attractions, advantages, institutions and internal improvements, with a statement of its public charities, Cincinnati, Ohio: Geo. S. Blanchard & Co., OL 14000562M
- Joseph Sabin, ed. (1871). "Cincinnati". Bibliotheca Americana. Vol. 4. New York. OCLC 13972268.
- A. W Robinson (1875), Complete descriptive pocket guide to Cincinnati and its suburbs, Cincinnati: Robinson & Murphy, OL 23290088M
- Daniel J. Kenny (1875), Illustrated Cincinnati, Cincinnati: R. Clarke, OL 7204999M
- "Cincinnati", Appleton's Illustrated Hand-Book of American Cities, New York: D. Appleton and Company, 1876
- Drone, Eaton Sylvester (1878). "Cincinnati" . Encyclopædia Britannica. Vol. 5 (9th ed.). pp. 782–784.
- Z. Harrison (1878), Description of the Cincinnati southern railway from Cincinnati to Chattanooga, Cincinnati: Spencer & Craig printing works, OCLC 13741078, OL 6937907M
- Peter Gibson Thomson (1880). "(Cincinnati)". A Bibliography of the State of Ohio. ISBN 9780405036873.
- Picturesque Cincinnati, Cincinnati, Ohio: The John Shillito Company, 1883, OL 25389494M

=== Published in the 20th century ===
- Business Men's Club of Cincinnati (1902), Cincinnati, Cincinnati, Ohio: Webb Stationery and Printing Co., OCLC 14585857, OL 24780926M
- "Cincinnati" . Encyclopædia Britannica. Vol. 6 (11th ed.). 1910. pp. 370–374.
- Department of Superintendence, National Education Association (February 22–27, 1915), Cincinnati: a city that, with well defined purpose, is seeking through the co-operation of all its institutions--social, civic, commercial, industrial, educational--to develop a unified system of public education that shall adequately meet the needs of all its people, Bachmeyer Press, OCLC 2188117, OL 6596956M
- Federal Writers' Project (1943), Cincinnati: a Guide to the Queen City and its Neighbors, American Guide Series, Cincinnati: Wiesen-Hart Press – via HathiTrust
- Robert I. Vexler (1975), Howard B. Furer (ed.), Cincinnati: a Chronological & Documentary History, 1676-1970, American Cities Chronology Series, Dobbs Ferry, N.Y.: Oceana Publications, ISBN 0-379-00603-0
- Ory Mazar Nergal, ed. (1980), "Cincinnati", Encyclopedia of American Cities, New York: E.P. Dutton, OL 4120668M
- Holli, Melvin G., and Jones, Peter d'A., eds. Biographical Dictionary of American Mayors, 1820-1980 (Greenwood Press, 1981) short scholarly biographies each of the city's mayors 1820 to 1980. online; see index at pp. 406–411 for list.
- John Clayton Thomas (1986). Between Citizen and City: Neighborhood Organizations and Urban Politics in Cincinnati. Studies in Government and Public Policy. University Press of Kansas. ISBN 978-0-7006-0303-9.
- "Great Lakes: Ohio: Cincinnati", USA, Let's Go, New York: St. Martin's Press, 1999, OL 24937240M
