= Cincinnati riots of 1841 =

Riots in Cincinnati, Ohio

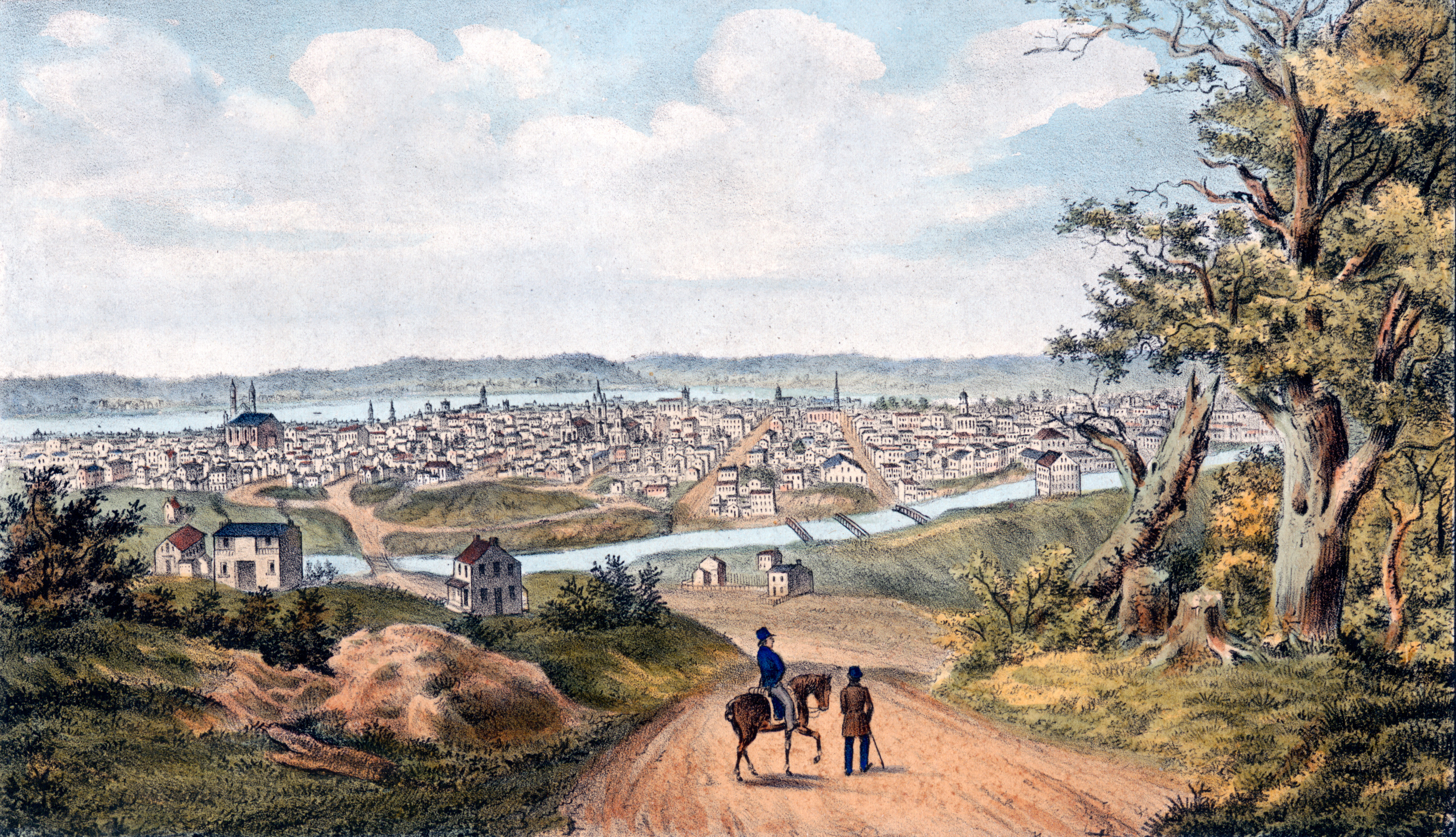
A view of Cincinnati, Ohio in 1841 from one of the surrounding hills to the north. In the foreground is the Miami and Erie Canal, and in the distance is the Ohio River and Kentucky.

The Cincinnati riots of 1841 occurred after a long drought had created widespread unemployment in Cincinnati, Ohio, United States. Over a period of several days in September 1841, unemployed whites attacked black residents who defended themselves. Many blacks were rounded up and held behind a cordon and then moved to the jail. According to the authorities, this was for their own protection.

== Background ==
By 1840, Cincinnati had grown from a frontier settlement to the sixth largest city in the US.

Many of the businessmen who controlled the city were interested in good relationships with the slave-owning states to the south of the Ohio River and were hostile to abolitionists and blacks. Although a free state, the Ohio constitution denied blacks the right to vote and the Black Laws passed by the state legislature in 1804 and 1807 imposed further restrictions. Black children were denied education in the public schools while black property owners were required to pay taxes to support these schools. Black migrants to the state were required to register and provide surety. Blacks could not serve on a jury, testify in legal cases involving a white person, or serve in the militia.

The black population of Cincinnati had grown from 690 in 1826 to an official count of 2,240 out of a total of 44,000 citizens by 1840. The city also had a high proportion of foreign born residents, nearly 40%. The Irish, more than any other foreign born group, competed with blacks for work and housing, and tensions rose as crowding increased. In 1850 Cincinnati had more blacks than any city of what was later called the Old Northwest, since they could find jobs on the steamboats and riverfront. By this time, many blacks had gained skilled jobs as craftsmen or tradesmen, earning good wages for the time. Many owned property.

== Buildup ==
On 1 August 1841, the black leaders held ceremonies to commemorate the Slavery Abolition Act 1833 that abolished slavery in the British colonies (except for India). Their celebration was viewed with hostility by many whites. That month the city experienced a drought and heat wave that caused the Ohio River to drop to the lowest waterline yet recorded, putting many men out of work who were dependent on river traffic. Idled and hot, men grew testy and argumentative.

Tensions mounted, with several scuffles between whites and blacks in their crowded neighborhoods. On the evening of Tuesday, 31 August, a group of Irish men got into a fight with some blacks. On Wednesday, the fight resumed. A mob of white men armed with clubs attacked the occupants of a black boarding house. The brawl spread to involve occupants of neighboring houses and lasted nearly an hour. Although several people were wounded on both sides, no one reported the incident to the police and no arrests were made. Another encounter took place on Thursday in which two white youths were badly injured, apparently with knives. That day, bands of angry whites were roaming the city. An eyewitness said blacks were "assaulted wherever found in the streets, and with such weapons and violence as to cause death."

== 3 September ==
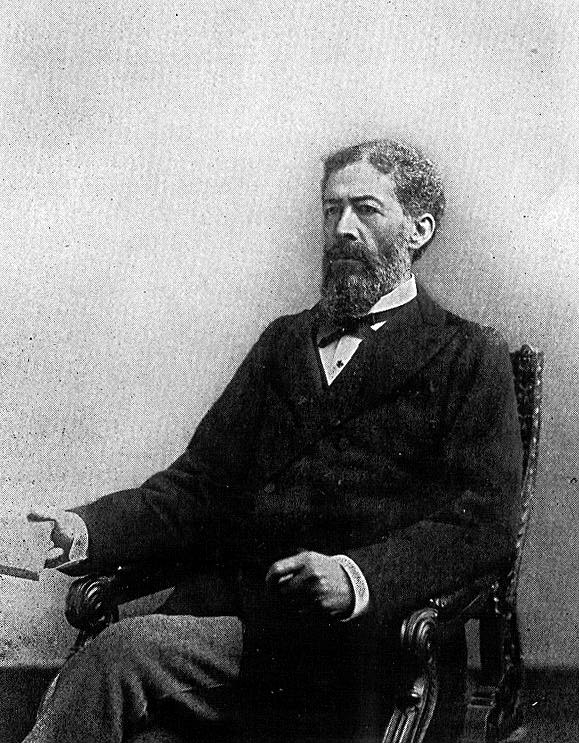
John Mercer Langston, political leader who witnessed the riots as a child

On Friday, there were rumors that more serious disturbances were planned. The Cincinnati Daily Gazette, which published a full report of the riots, did not hear of any special police precautions to prevent trouble.

According to John Mercer Langston, then a child of twelve and later an educator and distinguished politician, the black elders armed themselves with guns, planning their defense against attack and elected Major J. Wilkerson, a mulatto, as their leader. Wilkerson had been born a slave in Virginia in 1813 and had purchased his freedom, becoming an elder of the AME church in Cincinnati, a denomination established in 1819 and the first independent black church in the United States.

Langston later described Wilkerson as a "champion of his people's cause" who would "maintain his own rights as well as those of the people he led." Wilkerson ensured that the women and children were moved to safe places. He then deployed the men in defensive positions on roofs, in alleys and behind buildings.

An armed mob organized by people from Kentucky assembled in Fifth Street Market, carrying clubs and stones. Marching toward Broadway and Sixth streets, they wrecked a black-owned confectionery house on Broadway. The crowd grew and ignored calls from local officials, including the mayor, to disperse. Advancing to attack the black neighborhood, the mob was met with gunfire and retreated.

In several additional attacks, people on both sides were wounded and some reported killed. In the middle of the night, a group of whites brought in a six-pounder cannon loaded with boiler punchings and pointed it down Sixth street from Broadway. By this time many of the blacks had fled but fighting continued, the cannon being fired several times.

About 2 a.m., militiamen arrived and managed to end the fighting. The soldiers established a cordon around several blocks of the black neighborhood, holding those within captive. The militia also rounded up other blacks in the city and marched them into the cordoned-off area where they were held captive until they paid bond.

== 4 September ==
Mayor Samuel W. Davies called a public meeting the next morning (Saturday), at the Court House to discuss how to prevent further violence. The meeting resolved to find and arrest the blacks who had injured the two white boys. This group blamed the black community for the violence when in fact, the blacks had simply defended themselves from large, organized attacks by whites.

While strongly condemning abolitionists, the mayor's group vowed not to tolerate mob violence. The authorities promised to take action to drive out undesirable blacks from the city, saying they would enforce the black law of 1807 and the Fugitive Slave Act of 1793. They would protect African Americans and their property until they either gave bond or left the city.

Black leaders met in Bethel AME church and made assurances to the mayor that they would remain calm, suppress violations of law and order, and refrain from bearing arms. At a special session of the City Council, measures were passed to enlist ordinary citizens, officers, watchmen and firemen to help preserve the peace, authorizing the mayor to increase the number of deputies to five hundred, and calling for the county militia to be deployed.

The militia and temporary policemen (some of whom may have been rioters) were deployed throughout the city with orders to arrest every black man they found. Although many had fled the city to Walnut Hills to the north while others went into hiding, about 300 were rounded up and thrown into jail. A mob followed the prisoners to jail, taunting them, and extra guards were brought in to protect the prisoners. According to the newspapers, Kentuckians were free to visit the jail to search for runaway slaves.

Despite the resolutions and actions, city officials learned that the mob planned to resume attacks on Saturday after nightfall. The Mayor deployed peacekeeping forces which included the military, firemen, and authorized citizens, along with a troop of horses and several companies of volunteer infantry.

The mob organized and divided to attack at different points in the city. They broke into the building that held the press of the Philanthropist, breaking up the press and carrying it to the river where they threw it into the water. They broke into and wrecked several black-owned houses, shops and a church before they finally dispersed around dawn. The authorities took about forty of the mob into custody.

== Reactions ==
The editor of the Cincinnati Daily Gazette said that the riot could have been checked in its early phases: "A determined corps of fifty or one hundred men would have dispersed the crowd."

According to Langston, the mob's rioting was "the blackest and most detestable moment in Cincinnati's history."

In reaction to destruction caused by the riots, over the next few years the black community established several self-help organizations, including the United Colored Association, the Sons of Enterprise, and the Sons of Liberty. The antislavery author Harriet Beecher Stowe lived in Cincinnati at the time and was strongly influenced by accounts of violence she heard from refugees leaving the riot area.

== See also ==
- Cincinnati riots of 1829
- Cincinnati riots of 1836
- List of incidents of civil unrest in Cincinnati
- List of incidents of civil unrest in the United States
