= The Philanthropist (Cincinnati, Ohio) =

Short-lived antebellum abolitionist newspaper

- Type: Weekly newspaper
- Format: Tabloid
- Owner: Ohio Anti-Slavery Society
- Editor: Charles Osborn, James G. Birney
- Founded: January 1, 1836
- Ceased publication: October 11, 1843
- Political alignment: abolitionist
- Language: English
- Headquarters: Mount Pleasant, Ohio; Cincinnati, Ohio

Pdf of June 11, 1839 edition

The Philanthropist was an abolitionist newspaper printed in Cincinnati, Ohio, starting in 1836, edited by James G. Birney, and printed by Achilles Pugh for the Ohio Anti-Slavery Society. Originally published at New Richmond, Ohio due to complications with Cincinnati mayor Samuel W. Davies, the paper moved to Cincinnati in April 1836 to resume publication. The plan had always involved Cincinnati, but Birney wanted to publish a few issues out of the jurisdiction of Davies first. The paper often gave readers two sides of an argument, printing news items from the South that were proslavery and then critique them.

The paper was the target of at least two episodes of mob violence in the city. One incident occurred on July 30, 1836, when rioters broke into the printing offices of the paper and vandalized the interior, scattering the types throughout the streets. The mob continued to the Pugh's house and the residence of Birney, leaving both places undisturbed. They returned to the offices and debated on whether to burn the material, deciding not to do so because they were afraid that the homes in the area might also catch fire.

The mob then proceeded to the offices of Charles Hammond, editor of the Cincinnati Daily Gazette. Hammond was an ally of Birney insofar as free speech was concerned, though not an abolitionist. Deciding against action on the Gazette offices, the mob dispersed to the black areas of town and began vandalizing the area when gunfire erupted. After brief dispersal, the mob returned to the area and found abandoned homes, which they proceeded to enter and deface. At this point mayor Samuel W. Davies, who had watched the destruction of the office earlier, instructed the crowd to disperse.

During a second incident in September 1841, described in the Cincinnati Gazette, the printing press and office of the Philanthropist were destroyed. Indiana's Neel's [Neil's] Creek Anti-Slavery Society subsequently approved a set of resolutions condemning the attack, which "aimed a death-blow at the freedom of the press & the liberty of our country."

== See also ==
- Abolitionist publications
