= Commercial Gazette =

Commercial Gazette may refer to:

- Commercial Gazette, a newspaper that preceded the Cincinnati Commercial Tribune
- Commercial Gazette, a newspaper that preceded the Pittsburgh Post-Gazette
