= List of riots in Cincinnati =

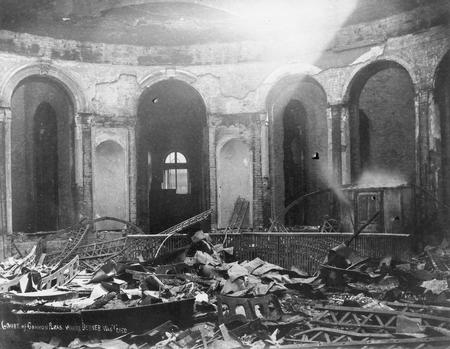
Hamilton County Courthouse, Cincinnati, after the 1884 riots

There has been a long history of rioting in Cincinnati, Ohio, United States, since the city was founded in 1788. Some riots were fueled by racial tension, while others by issues such as employment conditions and political justice.

== 1792 ==
The first riot recorded in Cincinnati was in 1792, after a merchant named John Bartle was beaten by a soldier. Fifty people were involved in the fighting. The riot between settlers and soldiers occurred when spring flooding had driven many people out of their cabins.

== 1829 ==
In the Cincinnati Riots of 1829, about 1,000 African Americans were driven out of the town by violent mobs. Some of the displaced people moved north to settle in Canada. After the 1829 riots, a growing number of whites became sympathetic to the rights of black people.

== 1836 ==
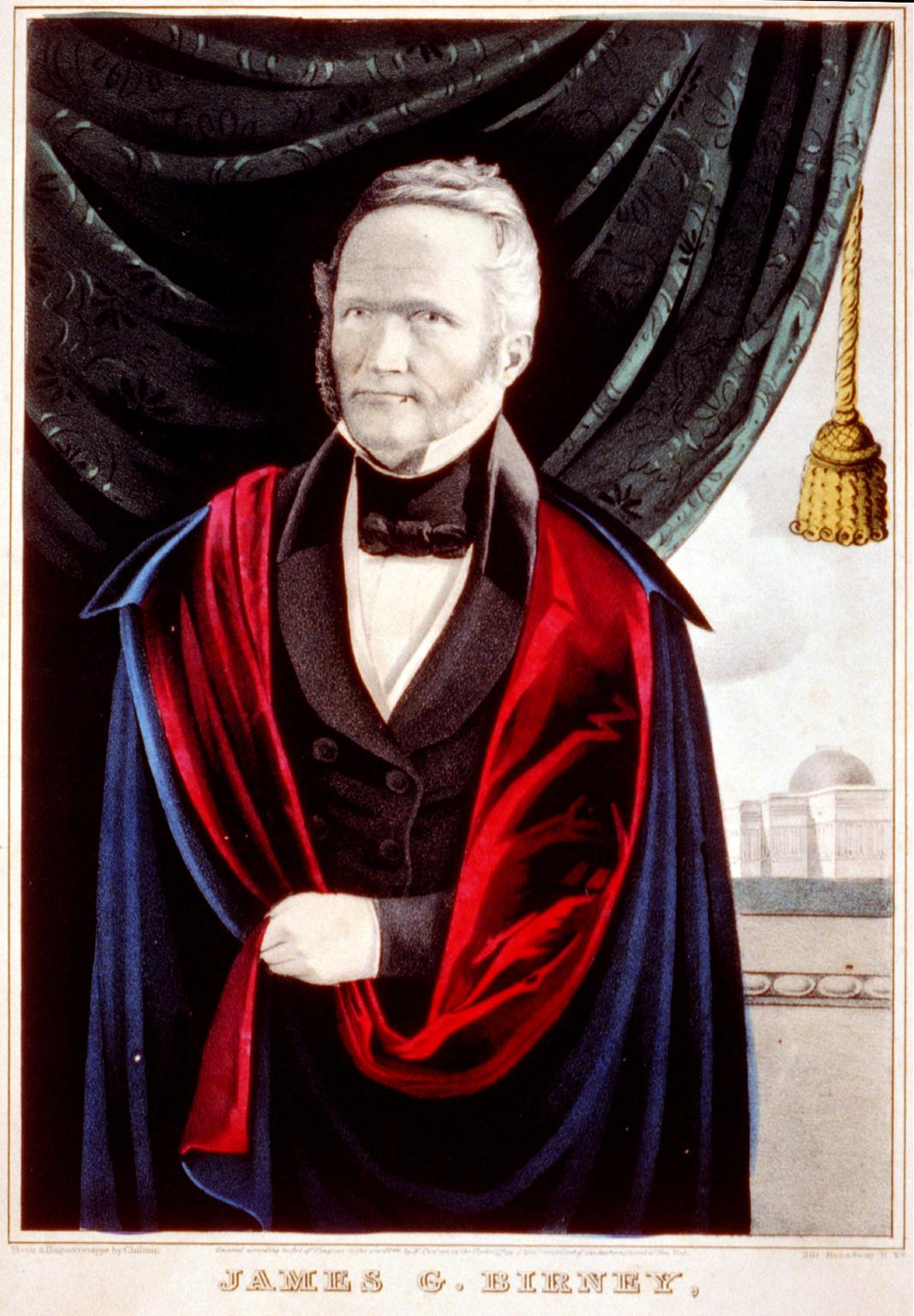
James G. Birney, abolitionist publisher whose press was twice destroyed during the 1836 riots.

The Cincinnati Riots of 1836 were caused by racial tensions at a time when African Americans were attacked by whites. The riots occurred in April and July. The rioters attacked both Negroes and the whites who supported them. An Abolitionist from New York, James Gillespie Birney, was instrumental. In January 1836 he set up the Cincinnati Weekly and Abolitionist, a newspaper sponsored by the Ohio Anti-Slavery Society. The newspaper targeted slaveholders across the Ohio River in Kentucky with anti-slavery propaganda. This angered local businessmen who were keen to do business with the Southern states. A riot broke out in April in which buildings were burned and several Black people lost their lives. The riot was only brought under control when the governor intervened and declared martial law. In July, the press that printed Birney's newspaper was twice destroyed, and further damage was caused to Negro properties.

== 1841 ==
In the Cincinnati riots of 1841, a mob of white men met in the Fifth Street Market and marched on "Buck Town", an area along the riverfront that was mainly inhabited by African Americans. The African Americans were armed and ready. Whites secured a cannon, rolled it down Sixth Street, faced it toward Buck Town and fired it. Several people died during the riots. Martial law was declared, and about 300 black men were arrested. While they were in custody, many of their homes were attacked.

== 1853 ==
The Cincinnati Riot of 1853 broke out on 25 December 1853. An armed mob of about 500 German men with 100 women following marched on the home of Bishop John Purcell, protesting a visit by Cardinal Gaetano Bedini, the emissary of Pope Pius IX. The Germans, many of whom had been involved in the European revolutions of 1848, or whose families had been involved, identified Bedini with the forces of reaction and oppression. One protester was killed and over 60 were arrested.

== 1855 ==
The Cincinnati riots of 1855 were clashes between "nativists" and German-Americans. The nativists supported J.D. Taylor, the mayoral candidate for the anti-immigrant American Party, also known as the Know-Nothing Party. German-Americans erected barricades in the streets leading into their Over-the-Rhine neighborhood, and fired a cannon over the heads of a mob of nativists attacking them.

== 1884 ==
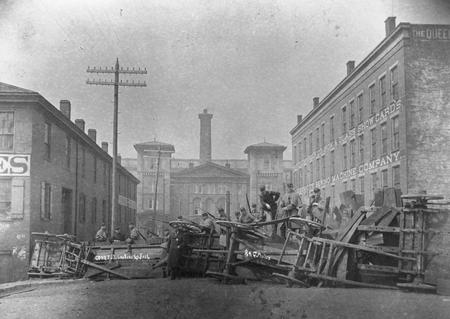
A hastily built barricade on Court Street, in 1884

The Cincinnati riots of 1884, also known as the Cincinnati Courthouse riots, were the most violent in the history of the city. They were caused by public outrage over the decision of a jury to return a verdict of manslaughter in a perceived clear case of murder. A mob in Cincinnati attempted to find and lynch the man. In the violence that followed over the next few days, over 50 people died and the courthouse and jail were destroyed.

== 1935 ==
In 1935 a fight between the students at Oyler School in Price Hill, one black and one white, quickly escalated. Police were forced to block the Eighth Street viaduct to separate groups of angry whites and blacks. During the riot, sixteen people were arrested.

== 1967 ==
The Avondale riot of 1967 followed years of police abuse and deteriorating living conditions in the poor black community of Avondale. The riots followed the disputed June 1967 conviction of Posteal Laskey Jr., accused of being the Cincinnati Strangler. The riots were ignited when Laskey's cousin, who was protesting the conviction, was arrested for loitering near the Abraham Lincoln statue at Rockdale Avenue and Reading Road on 12 June 1967. Crowds filled the streets and threw bottles and firebombs at businesses. The Ohio National Guard was called in to restore order. One person died and there were 404 arrests. In 1968, President Lyndon Johnson's Commission on Civil Disorders issued a report that blamed the riots on the poverty of the segregated neighborhoods in Cincinnati and the practice of police officers in "stopping Negroes on foot or in cars without obvious basis" and using loitering laws disproportionately against minorities.

== 1968 ==
The Avondale riot of 1968 broke out in Avondale after the assassination of Martin Luther King Jr., a civil rights leader, in April 1968. A mob smashed store windows and looted the stores or burned the merchandise. The Ohio National Guard was called to restore peace in Avondale. Two people were killed, at least 220 injured and 260 arrested during two nights of violence.

== 2001 ==
The 2001 Cincinnati riots were the largest urban disorders in the United States since the Los Angeles riots of 1992. Three days of rioting were triggered by a fatal police shooting of an unarmed African-American teenager, Timothy Thomas. On the third night of violence, looting, and vandalizing, Charlie Luken, the mayor of Cincinnati at the time, issued a citywide curfew which happened to be accompanied by rain, and the riots stopped. The curfew was for all of Cincinnati but was generally only enforced in the downtown area. There were no reports of rioting from the 13th or later. The immediate crisis had ended, but the immediate damage was estimated at $3.6 million. Many business in the downtown area were damaged in the riots, and many of 63 rioters were indicted on felony charges.

== 2020 ==
On May 29, 2020, a protest was held in Cincinnati following the murder of George Floyd, as part of the larger 2020 protests against racism. The protest that was held primarily in the Over-the-Rhine area of downtown began peacefully Friday night and continued through the early hours of Saturday morning. Many restaurants and boutiques in the area were left with their window shattered. Police in riot gear made continuous efforts to disperse the crowd, pushing them through the neighborhood from Pendleton to Washington Park and beyond. In addition, city councilperson Jeff Pastor was seen trying to calm protesters. Around 1 a.m. the protest seemed to break up, but general unrest persisted. Helicopters began circling the neighborhood shortly after 1 a.m. At 1:30 a.m. the Cincinnati Police Department issued the following statement to media outlets:

"Please understand we are dealing with several groups engaging in violent behavior in the downtown & OTR neighborhoods. Please advise your audiences that they should avoid this area as we attempt to stabilize these disturbances. If people do not have a legitimate reason to be in this area they should disperse. Thank you for communicating this to your viewers.

“As many of your reporters have reported from the field tonight there have been numerous buildings and businesses that have sustained property damage and likely theft of merchandise. Our primary effort right now is to stabilize this area and seek cooperation and calm from the groups engaging in violent and turbulent behavior. We will provide more details as this evolves related to property damage, thefts and any arrests that may have occurred. Please encourage your audiences and your reporters to use caution in this area. Stress that we are encouraging protesters to do so peacefully.”
