= Ohio Anti-Slavery Society =

American abolitionist organization

The Ohio Anti-Slavery Society (1835–1845) was an abolitionist Anti-Slavery Society established in Zanesville, Ohio, by American activists such as Gamaliel Bailey, Asa Mahan, John Rankin, Charles Finney and Theordore Dwight Weld.

== Background ==
=== Beginning ===
The Ohio Anti-Slavery Society was originally created as an auxiliary of the American Anti-Slavery Society. Its first meeting took place in Putnam, Ohio, in April of 1835, and gathered delegates from 25 counties, along with four corresponding members from other states, William T. Allan, James G. Birney, James A. Thome and Ebenezer Martin. Later, the society's headquarters moved to Cleveland, Ohio.

=== The Society ===
The society was created with the purpose of ending slavery in the United States. The Ohio Anti-Slavery Society's constitution stated that its objective was the "abolition of slavery throughout the United States and the elevation of our colored brethren to their proper rank as men."

Along with sponsoring traveling lecturers, the Society made James G. Birney's newspaper The Philanthropist its official press.

During the Cincinnati riots of 1836, pro-slavery citizens protested against the activities of the society and destroyed Birney's printing press. A committee of citizens asked for the closure of the newspaper, but their request was declined by the Society's executive committee on the basis of "freedom of press".

In 1836 – during the Society's first anniversary – the members voted for a new executive board that included: Gamaliel Bailey, James G. Birney, Isaac Colby, C. Donaldson, James C. Ludlow, Thomas Maylin, John Melendy, and Rees E. Price.

Several abolitionists considered the participation of African-Americans in the society unimportant and unnecessary, but John Rankin and Gamaliel Bailey "slowly accepted African American involvement," and "Rankin declared racial prejudice criminal and a violation of the 'law of love.'"

=== Expansion ===
In 1836, the Ohio Anti-Slavery Society grew from 20 chapters to 120 chapters in every part of the state. By December of the same year, ten thousand Ohioans were part of the Society.

== Division ==
During the 1840 anniversary of the society, its adherents passed a resolution that forbade it from becoming a political force. A portion of its members asked to cut their ties with the American Anti-Slavery Society and to keep a neutral approach in their abolitionist work.

In June 1841, a meeting was held at Mt. Pleasant, where several members vouched for independent political action. Some of the society's officials held a separate meeting exclusive for political abolitionists who eventually supported the Liberty Party.

Due to the post-panic economy, the Society and its official publication The Philanthropist started losing their prominence, and by September 1841 the presses were ravaged in a two-day riot.

== Publications ==
- Ohio Anti-slavery Society (1840). Report of the fifth anniversary of the Ohio State Anti-slavery Society : held in Massillon, Stark County, Ohio, May 27, 1840.
- Ohio Anti-slavery Society (1839). Report of the fourth anniversary of the Ohio Anti-slavery Society : held in Putnam, Muskingum County, Ohio : on the 29th of May, 1839. Cincinnati.
- Ohio Anti-slavery Society (1838). Memorial of the Ohio Anti-slavery Society : to the General Assembly of the state of Ohio. Cincinnati.
- Ohio Anti-slavery Society; Rankin, John (1838). "Includes "An Address to the Churches on Prejudice Against People of Color", by John Rankin". Report of the third anniversary of the Ohio Anti-slavery Society : held in Granville, Licking County, Ohio, on the 30th of May, 1838.
- Ohio Anti-Slavery Society (1837). Report of the second anniversary of the Ohio Anti-slavery Society : held in Mount Pleasant, Jefferson County, Ohio, on the twenty-seventh of April, 1837. Cincinnati, Ohio: The Antislavery Society.
- Ohio Anti-slavery Society (1836). Narrative of the late riotous proceedings against the liberty of the press, in Cincinnati : with remarks and historical notices, relating to emancipation : addressed to the people of Ohio.
- Thome, James A. (April 1836). Address to the females of Ohio : delivered at the State Anti-slavery Anniversary. Cincinnati: Ohio Anti-Slavery Society.
