= Cincinnati riots of 1829 =

Race-related rioting about jobs

- Part of Mass racial violence in the United States
- Date: August 15–22, 1829
- Location: Cincinnati, Ohio
- Caused by: Racism in the United States
- Goals: Expulsion of African Americans
- Methods: Rioting
- Result: African American flight to Canada; Little police involvement

Parties
Irish-American residents	African American residents

The Cincinnati race riots of 1829 were triggered by competition for jobs between Irish immigrants and native blacks and former slaves, in Cincinnati, Ohio but also were related to white fears given the rapid increases of free and fugitive blacks in the city during this decade, particularly in the preceding three years. Merchants complained about the poor neighborhoods along the river as having ill effects on their waterfront shops and trade with southern planters. Artisans excluded blacks from apprenticeships and jobs in the skilled trades. In June 1829 overseers of the poor announced that blacks would be required to post surety bonds of $500 (equivalent to $15,117 in 2025) within 30 days or face expulsion from the city and state. This was in accord with a 1807 Black Law passed by the Ohio legislature intended to discourage black settlement in the state.

Some blacks had already considered relocating to Canada, which they believed had a more accepting environment. They generally opposed the American Colonization Society's desire to export free people of color "back to Africa". African Americans had been in the United States for generations and wanted civil rights.

Proposed enforcement of Black Law, which the American Colonization Society pushed for so as to stimulate black emigration, convinced some leaders to leave the United States. The mob violence and destruction of their densely populated neighborhood in the First Ward caused an estimated 1,100-1,500 people of color to decide to leave Cincinnati altogether. Free blacks, former slaves and sympathetic whites donated money to help the refugees and survivors. Some settled elsewhere in the United States, while a smaller group moved to Canada. Most settled in existing towns in Ontario, where numerous refugee blacks lived after escaping from slavery. A group with more resources founded the Wilberforce Colony as a place of their own.

African Americans who remained in Cincinnati, and black migrants who joined them, were attacked again by white rioters in 1836 and 1841. By the latter date, they had strengthened their position in the city and used the political process to gain improvements in treatment. Anti-Black violence in the North was not uncommon.

== Background ==
Cincinnati is located in southern Ohio, which was a free state, but it had been settled by many migrants from the Upper South, who traveled along the Ohio River to reach it. In the early decades of the 19th century, most of its residents were from eastern states, particularly Virginia and Pennsylvania, and it was strongly influenced by Southern attitudes. It was described as having the economy and policies of the South, while serving as a gateway to and having the aspirations of the "west," as the developing frontier of the Ohio River valley was known.

During the early 19th century, with the development of the steamboats, shipping and trade along the Ohio and Mississippi rivers dramatically expanded, causing Cincinnati to grow rapidly. Its businesses attracted many new residents seeking work, creating a volatile, highly competitive environment. It was also distinguished by a high rate of immigration, especially from Ireland and Germany from the 1840s onward.

The Irish had started arriving as immigrants earlier in the 19th century, drawn by work on the canals which were being constructed in Ohio from the 1820s to 1845, and the National Road during the 1830s. These projects included the Miami and Erie Canal that was started in Cincinnati. The Irish competed with the growing number of black American migrants to the city, many of whom came from Kentucky and Virginia.

Between 1820 and 1829, there was a rapid increase in the black population of the city: in the last three years the flow of migrants was the highest, mostly free blacks and former slaves from the South. The latter continued to be at risk of capture by slave catchers. The number of blacks in Cincinnati increased from 433 to 2,258 during this decade, while the total city population increased from 9,642 to 24,831 in 1830. Percentage-wise, this was an increase from 4.5% to 9%. Because of work opportunities generated by the steamboat industry and shipping, Cincinnati had the largest black population of any city in the Old West through most of the 19th century. Poor and ill-educated, new residents crowded into available housing or built shanties and often lived in poor conditions. Irish immigrants and blacks both competed for housing in poor neighborhoods along the river, as most workers lived within walking distance of their work.

Ohio had historically tried to discourage free black settlement, but the rapid change of population demographics in Cincinnati raised anxieties among several classes of whites. The merchant class feared that the large population of blacks near the river would discourage steamboat travelers from shopping in their retail stores, and affect growing trade with Southern planters. Others associated the poverty of the blacks with moral failings that would detract from the image of what they were calling the "Queen City."

Skilled craftsmen and artisans were already under pressure as mechanization was proceeding. They were under pressure to cut costs, and industrialists divided jobs, apportioning low-skilled work to blacks and women. The artisans resented blacks in the job market, refusing to take them as apprentices in the skilled trades, and blaming them as scapegoats.

In 1826, 49% of the First Ward residents were native black and African; this area was close to the river and had an African Methodist Episcopal Church. White residents complained that the shacks of the poor were fire hazards, especially since Cincinnati did not have adequate city services at the time. The city council included merchants and business owners, and recognized that the housing reflected the poverty of workers. They did not take any action.

By 1829 there was other opposition to black migration in Ohio as a whole. A chapter of the American Colonization Society had been formed, encouraging blacks to relocate to Africa. In Cincinnati as in Philadelphia, many free people of color were from families that had lived in the United States for generations, and they had no desire to leave. Rising sentiment against black settlement in Cincinnati was expressed in various wards by residents saying they would vote only for trustees in the upcoming elections who would limit the number of black residents.

After the election, on 30 June 1829 township trustees and overseers of the poor issued a notice enforcing the 1807 Ohio Black Law, saying that blacks had to post bonds of surety within 30 days, or face being expelled from the town and from Ohio, as the act would be "rigidly enforced." While editor Charles Hammond wrote in the Cincinnati Daily Gazette that the law was directed at vagrants or runaway slaves; native-born blacks justly feared that it would be loosely applied against all blacks, with negative effects for those who were among the free working class.

Leaders among the free black community had been considering other possibilities for settlement, as they were tired of discrimination in Ohio. They had learned that conditions in Ontario, Canada, a destination of many fugitive slaves, appeared to be more accepting. They wanted a place where they could live without persecution. With publication of enforcement of the bond law, they feared mob violence. They appealed to the public for a three-month extension in order to be able to identify other places for relocation, and ran daily notices from July 30 to August 10 about their progress.

== Riots of 1829 ==
Between August 15 and August 22, mobs of 200-300 ethnic whites attacked the black areas of the First Ward, wanting to push blacks out of the city. Many of these were Irish men. Some blacks moved away, but others organized to defend themselves. The town officials did little to defend the blacks until 24 August. On that day the mayor, Isaac G. Burnet, dismissed charges against ten blacks who had been arrested; he imposed fines on eight whites. By the end of August, 1100 to 1500 blacks had left the city: some as refugees from the violence, seeking shelter anywhere in the area. Another group, which had already been considering emigration, organized to relocate to Canada.

According to the accounts of Black Americans John Malvin and James C. Brown, their desire to exercise their civil rights and "live free from the trammels of social and unequal laws" was their chief inspiration for moving to Canada. After the riots, in order to escape continued persecution, an estimated 460 to 2000 emigrants reached Canada. Most settled in existing towns, especially after seeing frontier conditions. But numerous families arranged to buy land and together founded Wilberforce Colony in Ontario. Evidence suggests that of the initial exodus, only five or six families reached the Ontario colony in the first year. After clearing land and building shelters, the new families of Wilberforce built a school for their children.

== Aftermath ==
Black American leaders in Philadelphia, Pennsylvania, which had a large population of free people of color, organized to found the first national Negro Convention in 1830. Among the topics discussed was the meaning of the riot in Cincinnati. Leaders continued to work to improve opportunities for blacks in education and employment, as well as to organize politically to express their positions.

Social tensions and competition resulted in white-led riots against blacks in Cincinnati again in 1836 and 1841. Immigration from Europe had continued at a high rate: by 1840, more than 46% of the population of the city was foreign born. Many of the lower class competed directly with people of color for jobs, especially as industrialization reduced the number of artisan craft positions. By that time, blacks had strengthened their position in the city. They were able to use the political process to gain some protection and justice in these difficult conditions.

== See also ==
- Cincinnati riots of 1836
- Cincinnati riots of 1841
- List of incidents of civil unrest in Cincinnati
- List of incidents of civil unrest in the United States
