= Samuel W. Davies =

American politician

Samuel Watts Davies (ca. 1776 – December 22, 1843) was an American politician.

Samuel W. Davies was born in London, England, the son of John Davies and Mary Watts who immigrated to the United States in the late 18th century. In 1800 he lived in New York City where he operated a grocery store in Beekman Street. While in New York, Davies married Mary Ann Stall Thomas, a widow of Robert Thomas, and a daughter of John Stall and Frances Hiley of Philadelphia, Pennsylvania.

In ca. 1802 Davies followed his brother-in-law, General William Lytle to Williamsburg, Clermont Co., Ohio. Gen. Lytle and his wife, Eliza Stall had first moved to Lexington, Kentucky]. In 1797 Gen. Lytle and his brother, John Lytle founded the town of Williamsburg and began residing there. Once in Williamsburg, Samuel Davies purchased 1,300 acres on the East Fork of the Little Miami River. He also built a sizeable stone house on Front Street and began operating a general merchandise store in the town. Historians indicate that this store was probably much smaller than the one he had operated in New York City, and probably specialized in farm implements and supplies for the local farmers in rural Clermont County. They also suggest that he took payments at his store in the form of grains, flours, hides, and other products that poorer, rural people used in the absence of state issued currency. By 1805, Davies was using the wealth he acquired from his business to make land investments. There were reports that he was quite "busy" at the land office in Cincinnati. In 1806, he became postmaster general of Williamsburg after his brother-in-law, Gen. Lytle retired from the post. He also ran for public office for state representative but was defeated in the election.

In ca. 1809, Gen. Lytle again moved, this time to neighboring Cincinnati, and once again, Samuel Davies followed him sometime thereafter. By June 1811, Davies was advertising his farm on the East Fork of the Little Miami River for sale, and requested potential buyers to inquire with either Nicholas Sinks in Williamsburg or with himself in Cincinnati, Ohio. Not long after his relocation to Cincinnati, Davies made another foray into politics and this time was successful. On September 9, 1811, he became secretary of a meeting of Republican delegates from the townships of Hamilton County. This meeting was significant because it was used to choose candidates who would run for public office in elections. By April 1813 he was elected to be town recorder and by the following year, in April 1814, he was elected president of the town council. In 1814, he also became secretary of a meeting that was to create a new charter for the city which would give it the ability to regulate water supplies, drainage systems, and sewage. This was a crucial development given that Cincinnati was a rapidly growing city that would soon rank in importance and size as a major American city after Philadelphia and New York. From this point on, Samuel Davies became a respected and influential person in city affairs. He was a constant presence on city councils and in local organizations. He was secretary of the Cincinnati Lancaster Seminary and when the school became the Cincinnati College in 1819, Davies served as one of its first trustees.

On March 2, 1814, Samuel Davies' wife, Mary Ann Stall died. He was left a widower with seven children. The following spring, on March 6, 1815, he married again, to Clarissa H. Pierson, whose father, David Pierson was a veteran of the American Revolutionary War and who had just moved to Dayton, Montgomery County, Ohio. Clarissa H. Pierson was born September 14, 1785, and died February 28, 1863. She was buried at the Woodlands Cemetery in Montgomery County, Ohio with Samuel Davies' children and grandchildren. Samuel Davies' known children included Edward Watts Davies, who was born January 16, 1802, in New York City, died December 11, 1873, in Montgomery County, Ohio, and who married Mary Ann Pierce; Samuel Hiley Davies, who was born 1806 in Williamsburg, Clermont County, Ohio, died September 14, 1848, in Dayton, Montgomery County, Ohio, and who married Mary Loury; Mary Ann Davies, who was born November 3, 1807, in Williamsburg, Clermont County, Ohio, died July 1, 1863, and who apparently remained single; and Agnes Davies, who was born January 15, 1811, in Williamsburg, Ohio or Cincinnati, Ohio, died May 5, 1897, and who married John Stull.

In 1824, Samuel Davies helped form the Cincinnati Water Works, along with his capitalist investors, David B. Lawler, William Greene, Samuel Foote, J. P. Foote, and W. A. Ware. In 1826 he obtained a charter for the Cincinnati Water Company, but by 1827 he sold his interests in the water works completely. Davies had been a major force in trying to modernize the water system in the city of Cincinnati.

Samuel W. Davies was elected as mayor of Cincinnati in 1833, and served in that post for 10 consecutive years. During his term as mayor he had to deal with the Cincinnati Riots of 1836, when an abolitionist press was destroyed, and the Cincinnati riots of 1841 when a large mob attacked black neighborhoods on two consecutive nights, firing a cannon into the defendants.

He was one of the prominent figures in the history of Cincinnati of that time. Early writers speak highly of his "intelligence and strict integrity, both in public and private life". He was a Whig, and an Episcopalian.

He was one of the first in a company to establish the city water-works, from which would grow the present extensive system of water supply.

He died on December 22, 1843, in Cincinnati, Hamilton County, Ohio.
