= Cincinnati riots of 1836 =

Race riots in Ohio, United States

The Cincinnati riots of 1836 were ethnic riots caused by racial tensions at a time when African Americans, some of whom had escaped from slavery in the Southern United States, were competing with whites for jobs. The racial riots occurred in Cincinnati, Ohio, United States in April and July 1836 by a white mob against black residents of the city. These were part of a pattern of violence at that time. A severe riot had occurred in 1829, led by ethnic Irish, and another riot against blacks broke out in 1841. After the Cincinnati riots of 1829, in which many African Americans lost their homes and property, a growing number of whites, such as the "Lane rebels" who withdrew from the Cincinnati Lane Seminary en masse in 1834 over the issue of abolition, became sympathetic to their plight. The anti-abolitionist rioters of 1836, worried about their jobs if they had to compete with more blacks, attacked both the blacks and white supporters.

== Background ==
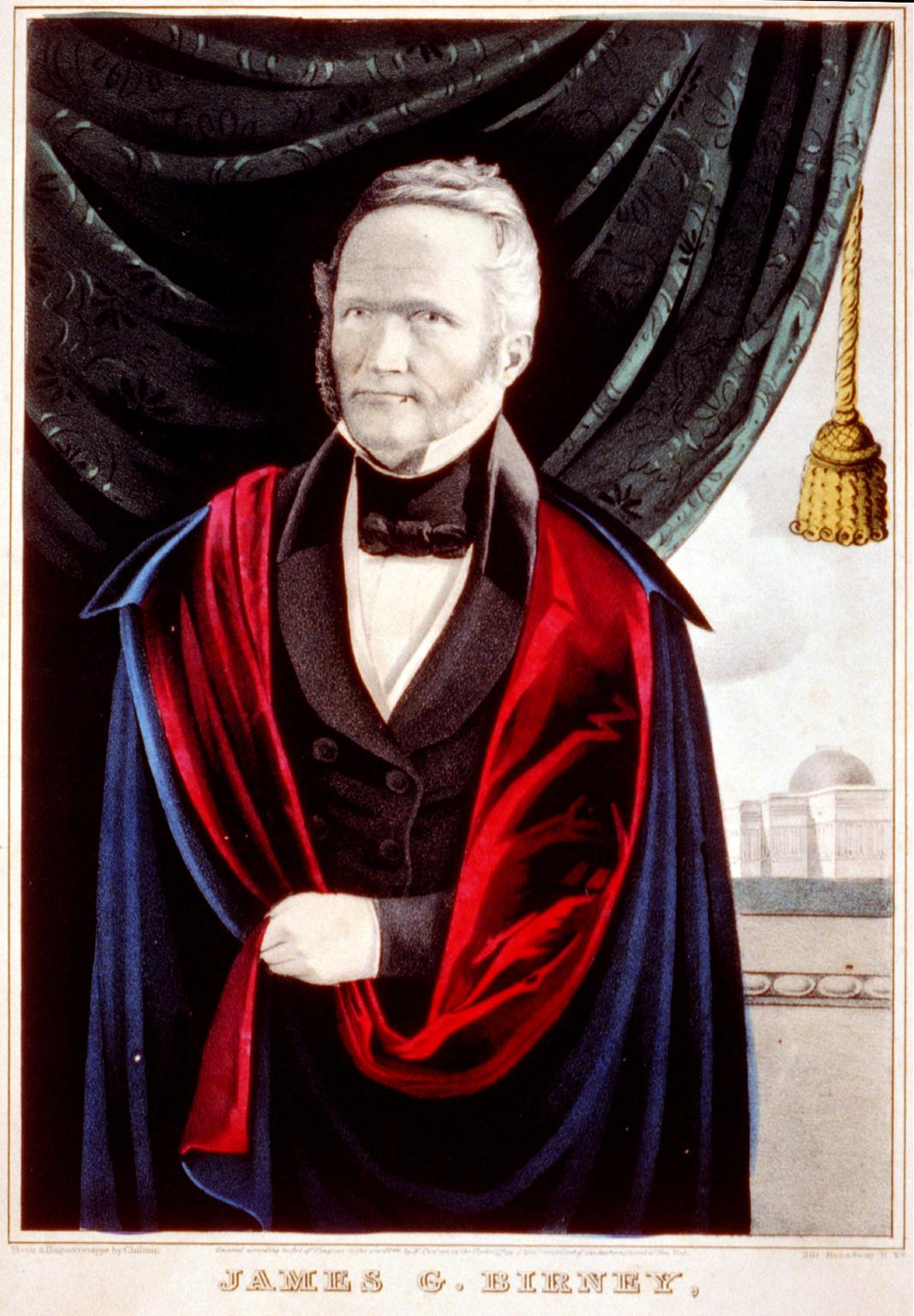
James G. Birney, abolitionist publisher whose press was twice destroyed during the riots.

Blacks in southern Ohio suffered from severe restrictions to their freedom due to the Black Codes passed by the state legislature in 1804 and 1807. Under this legislation, the testimony of any black person was invalid in a court of law. A black person could not defend himself against a charge, and could not bring action against a white man. If he managed to acquire property, he was taxed for school support, but his children were not allowed to attend the schools. A black person moving to the state was required to obtain the signatures of two white men on a $500 bond. The Fugitive Slave Act of 1793 was enforced rigorously, and steep fines were imposed on anyone who assisted a runaway slave.

Despite this, growing numbers of black people moved into the state within the first three decades, which aggravated tensions. In 1819 a citizen asked for relief "from the hordes of idle runaway blacks of both sexes, who are sauntering about the streets at all hours of the day". Some who were opposed to slavery but alarmed at the social consequences of abolition argued for colonization schemes, by which free blacks would be shipped to Liberia, as proposed by the American Colonization Society, which revived the Black Code of Ohio so as to stimulate emigration; or to Haiti (which was trying to recruit American blacks); or to the west coast of North America. Others were willing to risk public disapproval and fight for the rights of free blacks.

James Gillespie Birney, a former slave owner from Alabama, had become an abolitionist. In January 1836 he set up The Philanthropist, a newspaper sponsored by the Ohio Anti-Slavery Society. At first, the newspaper was printed in nearby New Richmond. It was distributed across the Ohio River in Kentucky and was filled with anti-slavery propaganda. This angered local Cincinnati businessmen, who were keen to do business with the Southern states.

In late January 1836, some of the most prominent citizens organized a meeting opposing abolition; it was attended by over 500 people. Birney attended the meeting but was not allowed to give his views.

== April riot ==
In April, Birney moved his press to Cincinnati. On 11 April 1836, a mob entered a black community, attacked people, burned buildings, and forced many of the occupants to leave their homes. Irish rioters burned down a tenement in the Ohio River bottom section of the lower West End. Several blacks died. The riot was not brought under control until the governor intervened and declared martial law. The anti-abolitionist paper the Daily Cincinnati Republican described the tenement that was burned as "notorious as a place of resort of rogues, thieves, and prostitutes - black and white". The paper said the arson was viewed by a "large concourse of our citizens" who made no effort to extinguish the flames.

== July riots ==
On 5 July, a race riot began when African Americans observed an Independence Day celebration. Although this had long been the custom of the blacks, some whites considered it as a demonstration that the blacks wanted full integration. James Birney attended the event, which helped stir up passions as he was a noted abolitionist. On 12 July 1836, about forty men broke into the building housing Birney's press and destroyed it. The men were described as "respectable and wealthy gentlemen". They shredded newspapers, broke the press in pieces, and dragged the damaged parts through the streets. Birney lost an estimated $1,500 in damage. He agreed to continue producing the paper only when his property was guaranteed to the value of $2,000 by the Ohio Anti-Slavery Society.

Following the press smashing, placards appeared saying "The Citizens of Cincinnati ... satisfied that the business of the place is receiving a vital stab from the wicked and misguided operations of the abolitionists, are resolved to arrest their course. The destruction of their Press on the night of the 12th instant, may be taken as a warning". On 17 July a placard was posted on the street corners:

"FUGITIVE FROM JUSTICE, $100 REWARD.
"The above sum will be paid for the delivery of one James G. Birney, a fugitive from justice, now abiding in the city of Cincinnati. Said Birney in all his associations and feelings is black; although his external appearance is white. The above reward will be paid and no questions asked by
OLD KENTUCKY".

At a public meeting on 23 July chaired by the city mayor, resolutions were passed that included promises to use all legal means to suppress abolitionist publications. On 30 July a mob again attacked and destroyed Birney's press, scattering its type. The rioters threatened to burn down Birney's house, but were dissuaded by his son. Men from Kentucky had a prominent role in the mob. The angry whites marched to a black neighborhood nicknamed the Swamp, where they burned down several houses. They went on to Church Alley, where they met resistance from armed blacks, but again destroyed their property.

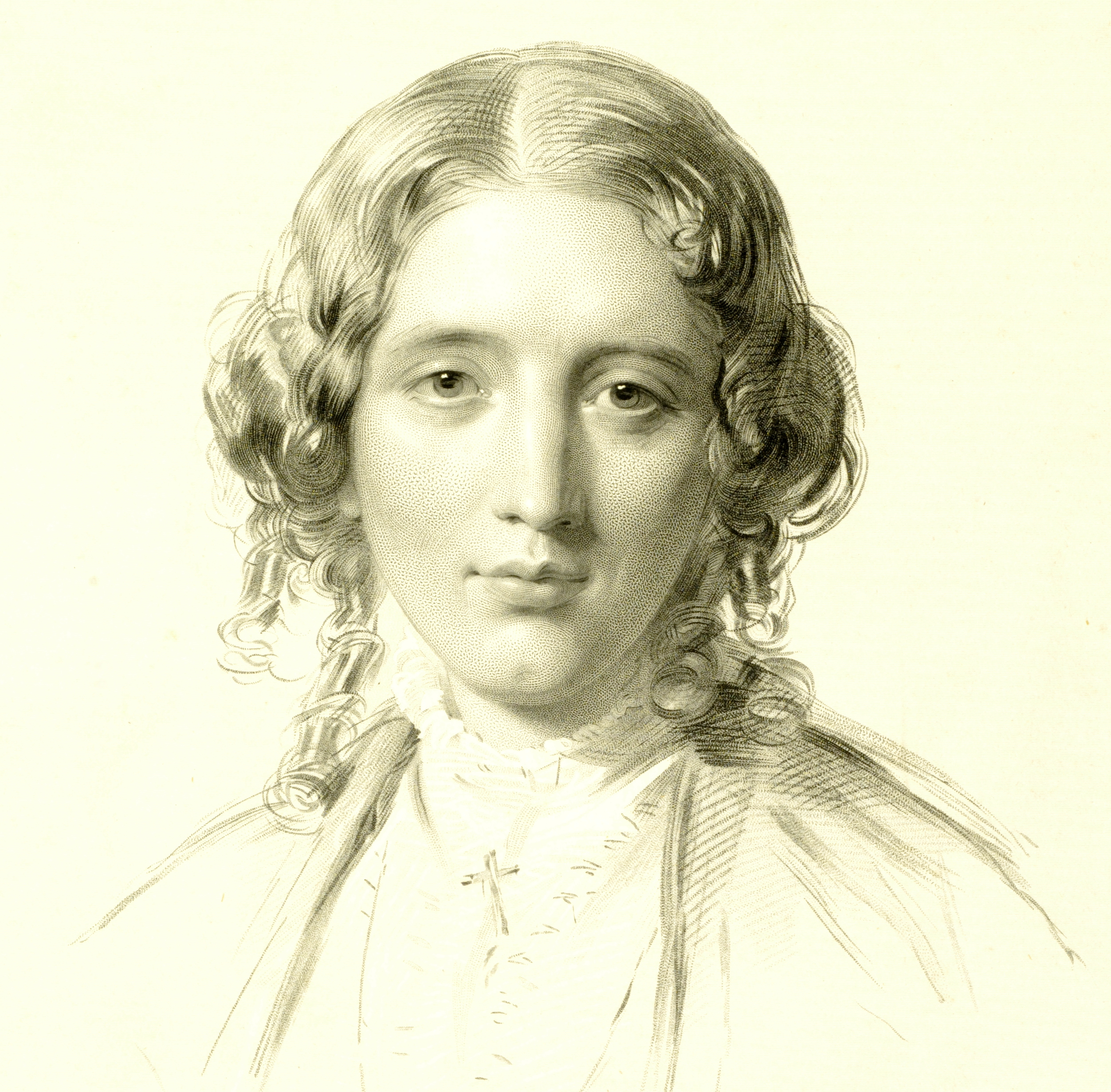
Early portrait of Harriet Beecher Stowe, 1853

Harriet Beecher Stowe, a resident of Cincinnati who later wrote the classic novel Uncle Tom's Cabin, described the events. When the press had been destroyed, she said,

The mayor was a silent spectator of these proceedings, and was heard to say, 'Well, lads, you have done well, so far; go home now before you disgrace yourselves;' but the 'lads' spent the rest of the night and a greater part of the next day (Sunday) in pulling down the houses of inoffensive and respectable blacks. The 'Gazette' office was threatened, the 'Journal' office was to go next; Lane Seminary and the water-works also were mentioned as probable points to be attacked by the mob. By Tuesday morning the city was pretty well alarmed. A regular corps of volunteers was organized, who for three nights patrolled the streets with firearms and with legal warrant from the mayor, who by this time was glad to give it, to put down the mob even by bloodshed.

It took several days for things to calm down. The authorities made no arrests.

== Reactions ==
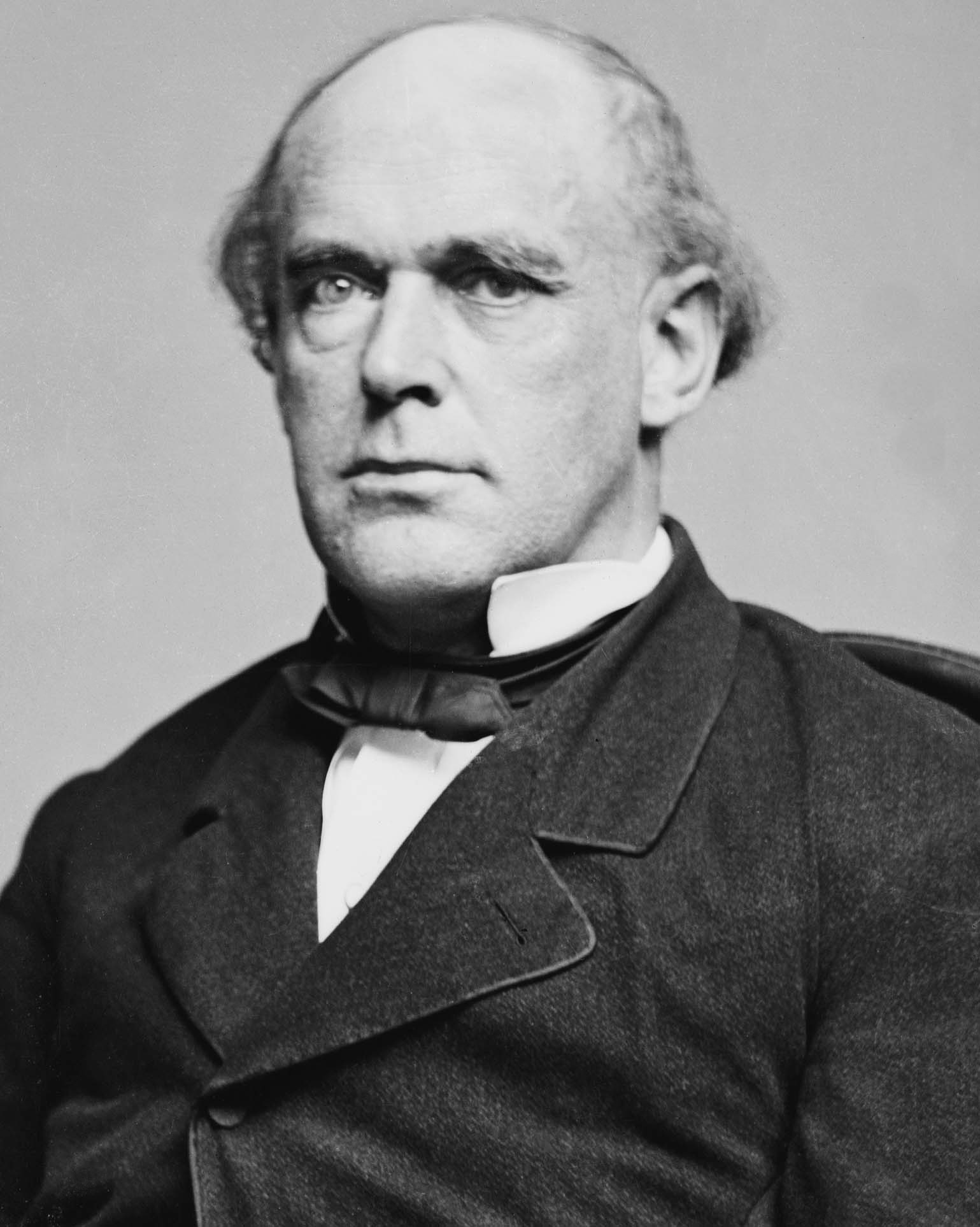
Salmon Portland Chase, later to become Chief Justice of the United States

The Ohio Anti-Slavery Society published a description of the riots, and commented on possible causes. Among these, they noted that while the black people of the city were preparing for their procession on the fifth of July (that being their custom), they were approached by a white citizen of "standing" who began to violently abuse them. One of the black men answered back in the same spirit, and this may have started the chain reaction. A more likely cause was considered to be the presence in the city of large numbers of visitors escaping from the heat of the South. A desire to please these valuable visitors may have led to the demonstrations against the abolitionist press.

An 1888 biography of Stowe said:

During the riots in 1836, when … free negroes were hunted like wild beasts through the streets of Cincinnati, only the distance from the city and the depths of mud saved Lane seminary and the Yankee Abolitionists at Walnut Hills from a similar fate.

The experience may well have influenced her subsequent views on civil rights. Salmon P. Chase, who was until this time opposed to abolitionism, was shocked when his sister fled the mob and took refuge in his house. Viewing the riot "with disgust and horror", he organized a mass meeting in favor of law and order.

Later he helped with a damage suit that resulting in compensation of $1,500 for the owners, printer, and editor of the Philanthropist, and went on to become prominent in the abolitionist movement. The publication of the Philanthropist was resumed, and the paper continued to be published for many years.

Discussing the riots, Harriet Martineau said of the businessmen of Cincinnati: "The day will come when their eyes will be cleansed from the gold-dust". She condemned them for violating the principle of freedom of speech, and described them as "more guilty in this tremendous question of Human Wrongs than even the slave-holders of the south". William Ellery Channing echoed this sentiment in a letter to James Birney, saying, "The abolitionists then not only appear in the character of champions of the colored race ... They are sufferers for the liberty of thought, speech and the press".

== See also ==
- Cincinnati riots of 1829
- Cincinnati riots of 1841
- List of incidents of civil unrest in Cincinnati
- List of incidents of civil unrest in the United States
