= James G. Birney =

American politician (1792–1857)

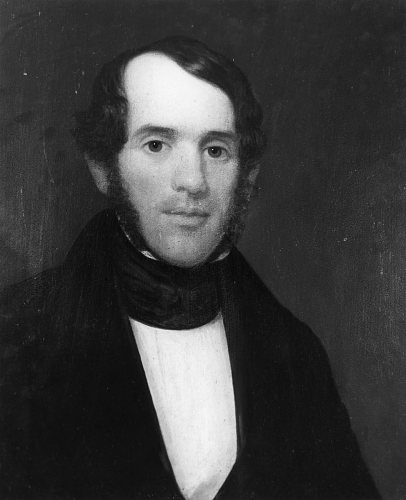
- Portrait, c. 1833

13th (Note: Before 1916, the office was known as "President.") Mayor of Huntsville, Alabama
- In office 1829–1830
- Preceded by: John H. Lewis
- Succeeded by: John Martin

Personal details
- Born: James Gillespie Birney; February 4, 1792 Danville, Virginia (now Kentucky), U.S.
- Died: November 18, 1857 (aged 65) Perth Amboy, New Jersey, U.S.
- Party: Democratic-Republican (before 1825); Liberty (1840–1848)
- Spouses: Agatha McDowell; Elizabeth Potts Fitzhugh
- Children: Five including: William; David; James
- Parents: James G. Birney Sr.; Martha Reed
- Education: Transylvania University; Princeton University (BA)

James Gillespie Birney (February 4, 1792 – November 18, 1857) was an American abolitionist, politician, and attorney born in Danville, Kentucky. He changed from being a planter and slave owner to abolitionism, publishing the abolitionist weekly The Philanthropist. He twice served as the presidential nominee for the anti-slavery Liberty Party.

Birney pursued a legal career in Danville after graduating from the College of New Jersey (later Princeton) and studying under Alexander J. Dallas. He volunteered for the campaigns of Henry Clay, served on the town council, and became a Freemason. In 1816, he won election to the Kentucky House of Representatives as a member of the Democratic-Republican Party. In 1818, he established a cotton plantation in Madison County, Alabama, and he won election to the Alabama House of Representatives the following year. Birney eventually sold the plantation and established a legal practice in Huntsville, Alabama, becoming one of the most successful lawyers in the region.

During the 1820s, Birney became increasingly troubled by the issue of slavery. He became a member of the American Colonization Society, which advocated for the migration of African Americans to the continent of Africa. After serving in various roles for the organization, Birney began calling for the immediate abolition of slavery. In 1835, he moved to Cincinnati, founding The Philanthropist the following year. He also became a member of the American Anti-Slavery Society, but resigned from that group due to his opposition to connecting the anti-slavery struggle to the movement for equal rights for women, although Birney endorsed the cause of women's suffrage. Birney accepted the Liberty Party's nomination in 1840 and received 0.3% of the popular vote. He accepted the Liberty Party nomination again in 1844 and received 2.3% of the popular vote, finishing behind James K. Polk and Clay. Birney moved to Michigan in 1841 and helped establish the town of Bay City, Michigan.

== Youth ==
Mercer County, Kentucky

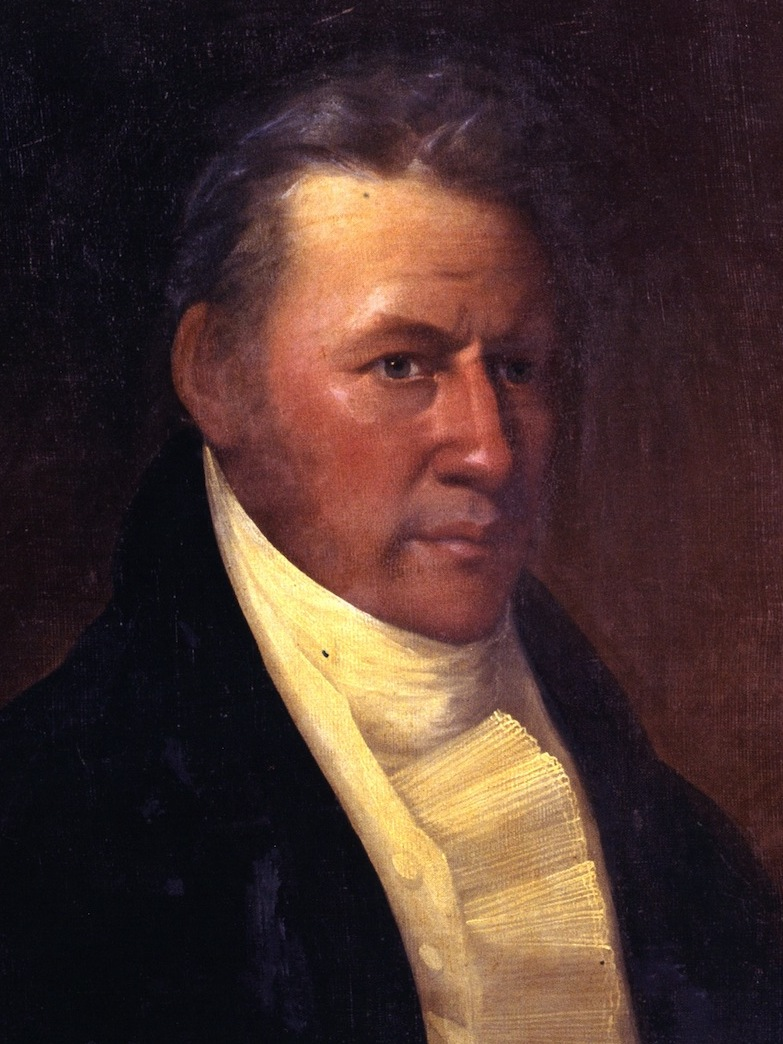
Birney's father

Born to an affluent Irish Episcopalian slaveholder of the same name in Danville, Kentucky, James G. Birney lost his mother, Martha Reed, when he was three. He and his sister were raised by their widowed aunt, who had come over from Ireland at the request of his father to look after the two. He was influenced by his aunt's opposition to slavery; she refused to own slaves. By 1795, his father's two sisters and their families had migrated from Ireland, settling on farms near his home. Most of his mother's relatives had also migrated nearby, settling in other areas of Mercer County, Kentucky.

Growing up, he saw the issue of slavery from a variety of perspectives. Though his father fought to prevent their state of Kentucky from joining the Union as a slave state, when the effort failed, he decided that until the legislature abolished slavery from the state as a whole, a person could own slaves as long as he treated them humanely. Other members of Birney's family felt a personal moral responsibility and refused to own slaves. For his own part, Birney agreed with his father and received his first slave, Michael, a boy his own age, at age six. However, for much of his youth and education, he was under the influence of teachers and friends with strong anti-slavery views. For example, he attended several sermons given by a Baptist abolitionist by the name of David Barrow in his youth, which he later recalled with fondness.

== Schooling ==
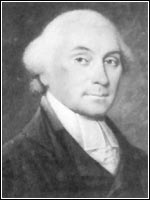
Samuel Stanhope Smith

When Birney turned eleven he was sent to Transylvania University in Lexington, Kentucky, where "one of Birney’s teachers, Robert Hamilton Bishop, was one of the state's earliest outspoken opponents of slavery." He returned home two years later to enter a school run by a Presbyterian man that had just opened in Danville, where he excelled in his studies, mostly based in the sciences. In 1808, at age sixteen, he entered the College of New Jersey (later, Princeton University). He studied political philosophy, logic, and moral philosophy, and became known as a proficient debater. Among his classmates, he became particularly good friends with George M. Dallas. He studied under the president of the school (Samuel Stanhope Smith), both a logician and an author who was somewhat anti-slavery. He was also exposed to the anti-slavery thinking of John McLean. Birney graduated from Princeton on September 26, 1810.

When he returned to Danville following graduation, he worked for the campaign of Henry Clay for one month. After this, he began to study law in Philadelphia, at the office of Alexander J. Dallas, the father of his Princeton friend and classmate. Enjoying considerable financial means, he had a horse carriage for transportation and was always well-dressed. He also made friends with members of the local Quaker community. He remained in Philadelphia with Dallas for the next three years, until he passed the Philadelphia bar examination and was admitted to the bar association, giving him the right to practice law.

== Law practice ==
In May 1814 Birney returned to his hometown and took up the practice of law there, becoming the acting attorney for the local bank. He handled both civil and criminal lawsuits in Danville and other outlying cities of Kentucky. The economy of Kentucky was rather poor at this time, as the War of 1812 had caused a schism in trade within the state. Having trouble making ends meet, Birney made his living at this time primarily as a claims adjuster.

Following in the footsteps of his father, Birney became a Freemason upon his return to Danville and a member of Danville's town council, making him a member of the town's social elite. He also fell in love with Agatha McDowell and married her on February 1, 1816, at a Presbyterian church; they had 11 children, of whom 6 survived to adulthood. Among the wedding gifts the young couple received were slaves from his father and father-in-law. As Birney had yet to fully develop his abolitionist views, he accepted them kindly. It should be said that later in life Birney was known to say on many occasions that he does not recall ever believing that slavery was right.

== Kentucky politics ==
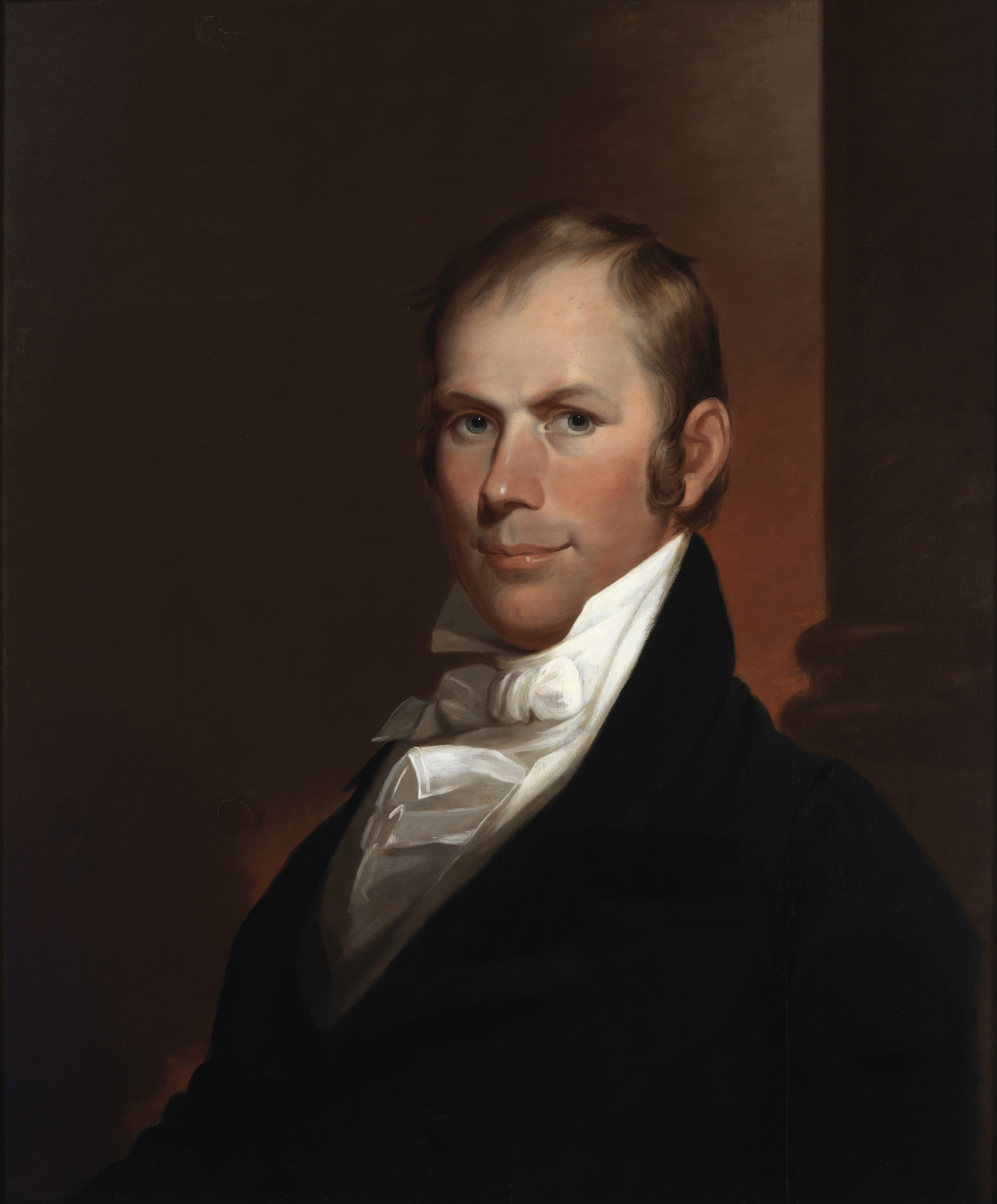
Henry Clay

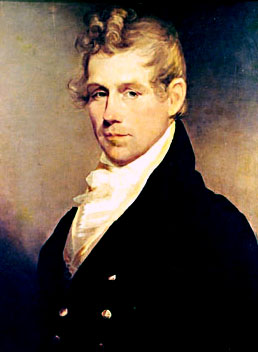
John McKinley

In 1815, he again worked for the successful campaign of Henry Clay, who was running for U.S. Congress. He also campaigned for George Madison, who was running for Kentucky governor and won (Madison died months later). George Madison was also the maternal uncle of his wife, Agatha McDowell. His political sentiments at the time were with the Democratic-Republican Party. In 1816, Birney won a seat in the Kentucky Legislature representing Mercer County, becoming a member of the Kentucky House of Representatives at age twenty-four. In 1817, the Kentucky Senate drafted a resolution that proposed opening a dialogue between the newly installed governor of Kentucky, Gabriel Slaughter, and the governors of Ohio and Indiana for the purpose of passing laws in those states calling for the capture and return of runaway slaves from Kentucky.

Birney staunchly opposed this resolution and it was defeated, though a new resolution was soon after drafted and passed, despite Birney's opposition yet again. As he saw very little future for himself in Kentucky politics, Birney decided to move to Alabama with the hope of starting a political career.

== Alabama ==
Madison County, Alabama

In February 1818, he moved his family to Madison County, Alabama, where he purchased a cotton plantation and slaves, most of whom came with him from Kentucky. In 1819, Birney became a member of the Alabama House of Representatives representing Madison County. While there, he helped draft an act that would afford slaves tried by jury paid legal counsel, barring the master and prosecutorial witness or their relatives from being members of the jury. This, along with his opposition to the nomination of Andrew Jackson for U.S. president, hampered many of his future political ambitions in Alabama. He opposed Jackson primarily on the grounds that he was foul-tempered, having executed two men personally.

In 1823, after experiencing many troubles with his cotton plantation, Birney moved to Huntsville, Alabama, to practice law again. His financial troubles were due in part to his habit of gambling on horse races, which he eventually gave up after suffering many losses. Most of his slaves stayed on at the plantation, though he did bring with him to Huntsville his servant Michael, as well as Michael's wife and three children.

At this time there were a number of other practicing lawyers in that area, including one John McKinley. His name preceded him, and he was admitted to the Alabama bar association. McKinley, along with several other prominent members of society, successfully campaigned for Birney to become the solicitor of Alabama's Fifth District in 1823. By the end of the year he decided to close his plantation, and sold the slaves at the plantation to a friend of his that was known for his good temperament and kind treatment of slaves. Following the sale of the plantation and slaves, he achieved financial stability, bought a generous plot of land and constructed a large brick house in Huntsville. As was true upon his first return to Danville years back, he once again became a member of the social elite in this new town. In addition to his duties as a public prosecutor, his private law office proved quite lucrative.

By 1825, Birney was the wealthiest lawyer in northern Alabama, partnering with Arthur F. Hopkins. The next year, he resigned as solicitor general to pursue his own career with more tenacity. Over the next several years, he worked, often defending Black people, was appointed a trustee of a private school and joined the Presbyterian Church. In 1828, he became an elector on the John Quincy Adams and Richard Rush ticket. He strongly supported Adams for his conservatism, viewing the politics of Andrew Jackson and John C. Calhoun as a threat to the Union. To Birney's great disappointment, Jackson won. However, he found other ways to champion his beliefs. In 1829, his fellow citizens elected him mayor of Huntsville, where he distinguished himself as a reformer, campaigning for free public education and temperance.

=== American Colonization Society ===
Birney's religious fervor also encouraged him to reevaluate his views on slavery. He discovered the American Colonization Society in 1826. In 1829, increasingly alienated by the politics of the Jackson administration, he was introduced to Josiah Polk of the ACS by Henry Clay and became an early supporter of the society. He was intrigued by the possibility of solving the supposed problem constituted by free blacks by starting a colony for them in Liberia, Africa. In January 1830 he helped begin a chapter in Huntsville, Alabama, and subscribed to its literature.

He was then sent on a trip to the East Coast for the University of Alabama in search of professors for the college, following the receipt of a generous endowment for the school. From August through October 1830 he visited Philadelphia, New Brunswick, New York, New Haven, Boston, Ohio, and Kentucky. He returned home with numerous recommendations, and was thanked for his services. While in these areas, with the exception of Kentucky, he was greatly encouraged by the presence of free states in the Union. This same year, he had some sort of falling out with Henry Clay and also ceased further campaigning for the Democratic-Republican Party.

In 1831, Birney began considering moving to Illinois, as he was troubled with the idea of his children growing up in a slave state. He mentioned a move to Illinois frequently, stating he would free his remaining slave Michael, Michael's wife, and three children there. However, this never came to pass. In 1832, the American Colonization Society offered him a position as an agent to travel around the South promoting their cause and he accepted. He met with some success, including organizing the departure of settlers to Liberia and writing essays in defense of colonization. However, in failing to convert his audience to colonization, he began to doubt its effectiveness and the acceptability of slavery. By 1832, he had decided to return to Danville, Kentucky.

== Gradual emancipation ==
A year before returning to Danville, Birney wrote letters to slaveholders in Kentucky who had previously expressed their support for emancipation, suggesting they soon hold a convention on the matter. On December 6, 1832, the gathering was held, with only nine slave owners in attendance. Most of these pledged not to emancipate their current slaves, but to emancipate their slaves' offspring at age twenty-one. This small group also aimed to bring in non-slaveholders to promote this idea of "gradual emancipation".

== Abolitionist ==
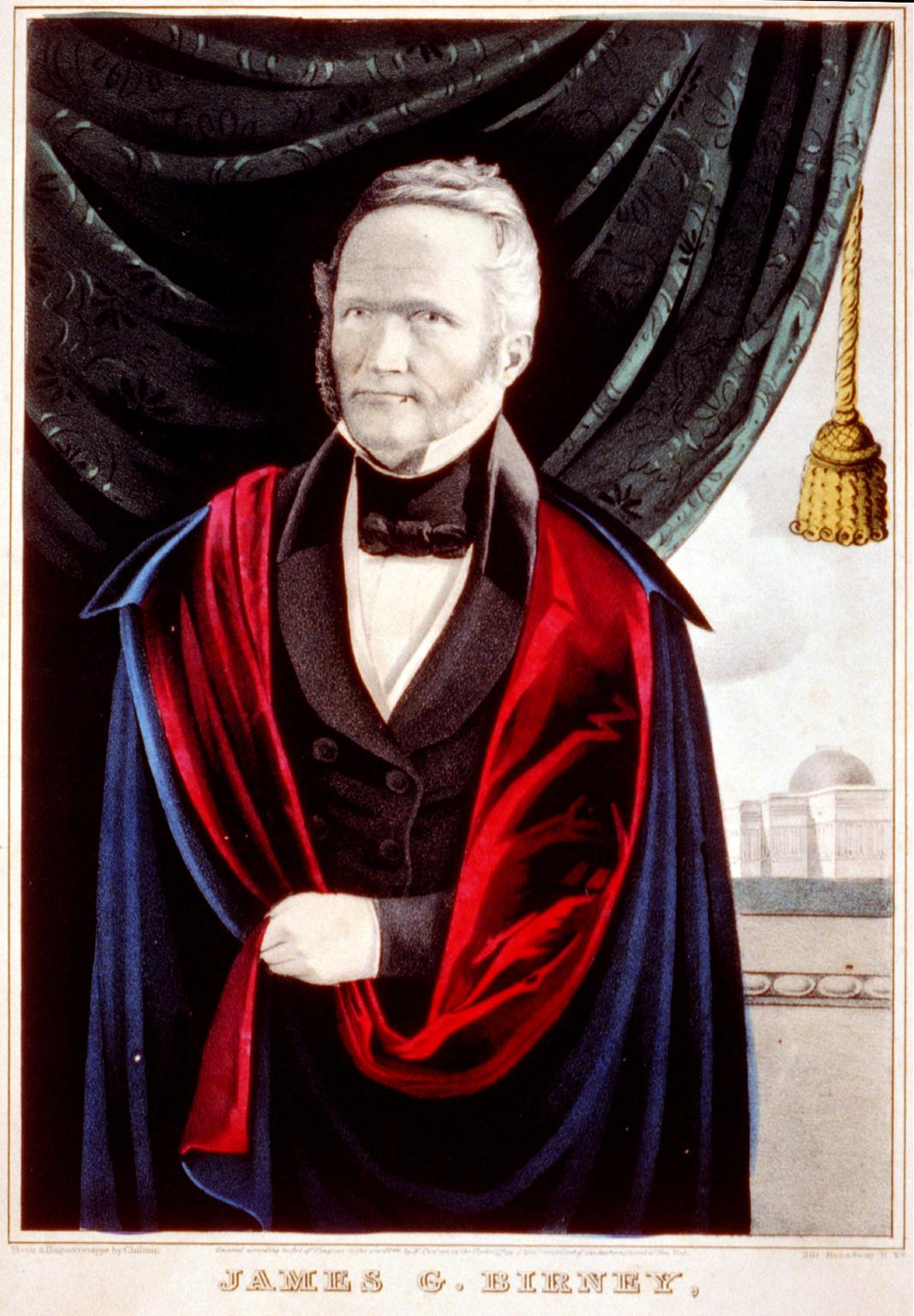
James G. Birney, abolitionist publisher whose press was twice destroyed during the Cincinnati riots of 1836.

Birney's repudiation of the American Colonization Society and its projects was enormously influential; Gerrit Smith called it "celebrated". He was the society's employee, one of its agents. "No man has a better knowledge of colonization and its practical effects at the South."

In 1833, he read a paper signed by several Christian organizations that repudiated the tenets of the American Colonization Society and, instead, called for the immediate abolition of slavery. Almost the entirety of the following number of the society's magazine, African Repository, was devoted to an answer or "review" of him. This, along with life experience and education, brought Birney to the realization that slavery must be abolished once and for all. Inspired by correspondence and discussions with Theodore Weld, the organizer of the Lane Seminary debates, he freed his remaining slaves and declared himself an abolitionist in 1834.

=== Birney's abolitionist writings ===
- Birney, James G. (August 16, 1834). "Letter of Hon. J. G. Birney. To the Rev. Thornton J. Mills, Corresponding Secretary of the Kentucky Colonization Society, July 15, 1834 (p. 1 of 3)". The Liberator. From the Lexington, Ky., Intelligencer of July 22. p. 1 – via newspapers.com.
- Birney, James G. (August 16, 1834). "Letter of Hon. J. G. Birney. To the Rev. Thornton J. Mills, Corresponding Secretary of the Kentucky Colonization Society, July 15, 1834 (p. 2 of 3)". The Liberator. From the Lexington, Ky., Intelligencer of July 22. p. 2 – via newspapers.com.
- Birney, James G. (August 16, 1834). "Letter of Hon. J. G. Birney. To the Rev. Thornton J. Mills, Corresponding Secretary of the Kentucky Colonization Society, July 15, 1834". The Liberator. From the Lexington, Ky., Intelligencer of July 22. p. 3 – via newspapers.com.
  - Birney, James G. (1838). Letter on colonization, addressed to the Rev. Thornton J. Mills, corresponding secretary of the Kentucky colonization society. New York: American Anti-Slavery Society.
- Birney, James G. (October 4, 1834). "To the Ministers and Elders of the Presbyterian Church in Kentucky (p. 1 of 2)". The Liberator. From the Cincinnati Journal. p. 1 – via newspapers.com.
- Birney, James G. (October 4, 1834). "To the Ministers and Elders of the Presbyterian Church in Kentucky (page 2 of 2)". The Liberator. From the Cincinnati Journal. p. 2 – via newspapers.com.
- Birney, James G. (1834). "Mr. Birney's letter to the churches".
- Birney, James G. (1834). "A collection of valuable documents, being Birney's vindication of abolitionists : protest of the American A. S. Society; to the people of the United States, or, to such Americans as value their rights; letter from the Executive Committee of the N. Y. A. S. Society, to the Exec. Com. of the Ohio State A. S. S. at Cincinnati; outrage upon southern rights". OCLC 838708108.
- Birney, James G. (1846). Sinfulness of Slaveholding in all Circumstances; Tested by Reason and Scripture. Detroit.

=== Abolitionist newspaper ===
"What ought to be done with them?" asked the Post. "We would say: Send them back to the place from whence they came, and if any of their authors, or the agents of them, should be found here, lynch them."

— Cincinnati Daily Post, August 1835

Birney decided to make Cincinnati his base, and made contacts with friends and fellow members of the abolitionist movement there. He worked to gain support in publishing an anti-slavery newspaper. At this time, there were four newspapers in the city, and all but the Cincinnati Daily Gazette released "critically-roundabout" editorials the next day that assailed the faults of abolitionism in general. One paper, The Daily Post (not to be confused with the Cincinnati Post), even called for lynching those who set out to author anti-slavery literature in their city.

The Gazette, which was owned by editor Charles Hammond, came to be an ally of sorts to Birney and his paper. While Hammond himself did not support equal rights for Blacks, he did support the idea of a free press and freedom of speech. He also strongly resented the attempts of the South to legalize slaveholding in the North.

Birney's original plan was to publish his abolitionist newspaper in Danville. In August 1835, a meeting of "4 or 500 persons, has met at Danville, K., to warn James G. Birney against publication of his Abolition paper. A Committee of 5 was selected to wait on [meet with] Birney, and serve him with a copy of their Resolutions. He must be a daft man to persevere! It will be at his own peril. He will rue the consequences, as sure as he persists." In September we find that he "has abandoned the project of publishing an Abolition paper in Danville, Ky., and has removed to Cincinnati. A very good idea."

We have little doubt that his office will be torn down, but we trust that Mr. Birney will receive no personal harm. Notwithstanding his mad notions, we consider him an honest and benevolent man. He is resolute, too. Not having been permitted to open his battery in this State, he is determined to cannonade us from across the river. Isn't it rather too long a shot for execution, Mr. Birney?

— Louisville Journal, January 1836

When Birney began publication of his abolitionist weekly, The Philanthropist, in Cincinnati, he and the paper were from the first the subject of controversy, with the majority of local newspapers and others doing everything they could to make him feel unwelcome. The Louisville Journal wrote a scathing editorial that all but directly threatened his paper. (quoted at left).

On July 14, 1836, a mob destroyed Birney's press. On July 30 the press was attacked again; the printing press was broken into pieces and the largest piece dragged through the streets and dumped in the river. The mob attempted to tar and feather Birney but could not find him. They went on to destroy houses of Blacks; the whole constitutes the Cincinnati riots of 1836.

However, writing for his newspaper helped him develop ideas for fighting slavery legislatively. He used them as he worked with Salmon P. Chase to protect slaves who escaped to Ohio. In 1837, he was fined $50 (equivalent to $1,423 in 2025) for harboring a slave. That same year, the American Anti-Slavery Society recruited him as an officer and corresponding secretary, and he moved his family to New York.

=== Liberty Party ===
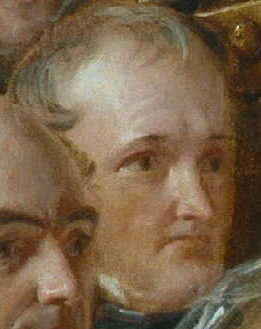
Birney is pictured here at the conference in 1840 in a large group painting. The figure to the left is John Beaumont (another abolitionist delegate).

With the American Anti-Slavery Society's schism in 1840, he resigned his position over disagreements on the role of women's rights to the anti-slavery campaign. Also in that year, the Liberty Party, a newly formed political party whose only aim was abolition, nominated Birney for president. Accurately predicting he would not win, he instead went as a delegate to the World Anti-Slavery Convention in London. The convention named him a vice-president and spread his writings throughout the United Kingdom. When he came back, the Liberty Party made use of his legal expertise in their efforts to defend blacks and fugitive slaves. They chose him as their candidate again in the 1844 presidential election with a campaign designed to draw votes away from the Whig Party candidate Henry Clay. In the New York election, Birney achieved 15,812 votes after Clay lost to the Democrat James K. Polk by only 5,106 votes; if Clay had won this state he would have achieved a majority in the Electoral College and won the election and so James K Polk became the 11th president of the United States instead of Henry Clay.

== Michigan ==
In 1841, Birney moved to Saginaw, Michigan, with his new wife and family. He lived at the Webster House in Saginaw for a few months until his home in Bay City, Michigan, was ready. Birney was in the land development business in Bay City. He was a trustee of the reorganized Saginaw Bay Company and was deeply involved in the planning of Bay City, Michigan, where Birney Park is named after him. Birney and the other developers supported churches in their community and set aside money for their construction. In addition to running for the presidency in 1840 and 1844, Birney received 3023 votes for Governor of Michigan in 1845. Birney remained in Michigan until 1855, when his health drove him to move to the East Coast.

While in Bay City, Birney led a life of farming and agricultural pursuits in addition to his legal work, land development, and national anti-slavery involvement. He commented on the lack of help available in the city and was found working on his own fence.

His son, James Birney, came to Bay City, then called Lower Saginaw, to take care of his father's business interests in the city. James remained in Bay City and followed his father's tradition of public service. He is buried in Pine Ridge Cemetery on the East side of town.

== Paralysis ==
In August 1845, Birney suffered from bouts of paralysis following a horseback riding accident, which recurred intermittently for the remainder of his life. His speech became affected as his condition worsened, until he was eventually left to communication through gestures and writing (the latter made difficult by severe tremors). He ended his public career and his direct involvement in the abolitionist movement as a result, though he kept himself informed of new developments and campaigned for causes including the abolition of the military during the Mexican-American War and a decrease in immigration, arguing that European immigrants diluted the influence of America's free people of color.

He died in New Jersey in 1857 in the Raritan Bay Union, a communal settlement, surrounded by abolitionist friends Theodore Weld, his wife Angelina Grimké Weld, and her sister Sarah Grimké, convinced that war would be necessary to end slavery. He was buried at the Williamsburg Cemetery in Groveland, New York, the home of his second wife's family.

== Honors ==
In 1889, an all-black school in the Hillsdale neighborhood of Washington, D.C., was named the Birney School in his honor. It later became an elementary school and in 1962 it was renamed Nichols Avenue Elementary School.

== Family ==
Birney married Agatha McDowell in 1816. Agatha was the daughter of U.S. district judge for Kentucky William McDowell and Margaret Madison, a distant relative of James Madison. James and Agatha's marriage produced eleven children, only six of whom survived early childhood: James, William, Dion, David Bell, George, and Florence. Agatha died in October 1838.

On 25 March 1841, Birney married Elizabeth Potts Fitzhugh (sister of Henry Fitzhugh and of Ann Carroll Fitzhugh, wife of Gerrit Smith). Their two children were Ann Hughes Birney (1844–1846) and Fitzhugh Birney (1842–1864).

Birney's oldest son James served as the 13th Lieutenant Governor of Michigan under Governor Austin Blair and as the U.S. Minister to the Netherlands.

Four of Birney's sons fought in the American Civil War. David was a Union Army major-general who died of disease in October 1864. William was a U.S. inspector-general of U.S. Colored Troops who later became a U.S. attorney for the District of Columbia. Dion was a U.S. lieutenant who died during the Peninsula campaign in 1862. Fitzhugh was a U.S. major at the time of his death by pneumonia in June 1864.

== Archival material ==
- James G. Birney Papers, William L. Clements Library, University of Michigan.
- James Gillespie Birney Papers, Manuscript Division, Library of Congress, Washington, D.C.

Party political offices
New political party	Liberty nominee for Vice President of the United States; 1840, 1844	Succeeded by John P. Hale; Withdrew
