= Black Laws of 1804 and 1807 =

Ohio's Black Laws that required free Black residents have a certificate then a bond

Black Laws of 1804 and 1807 discouraged African American migration to Ohio. Slavery was not permitted in the 1803 Constitution. The 1804 law forbade black residents in Ohio without a certificate if they were free. The 1807 law required a $500 bond for good behavior.

== History ==
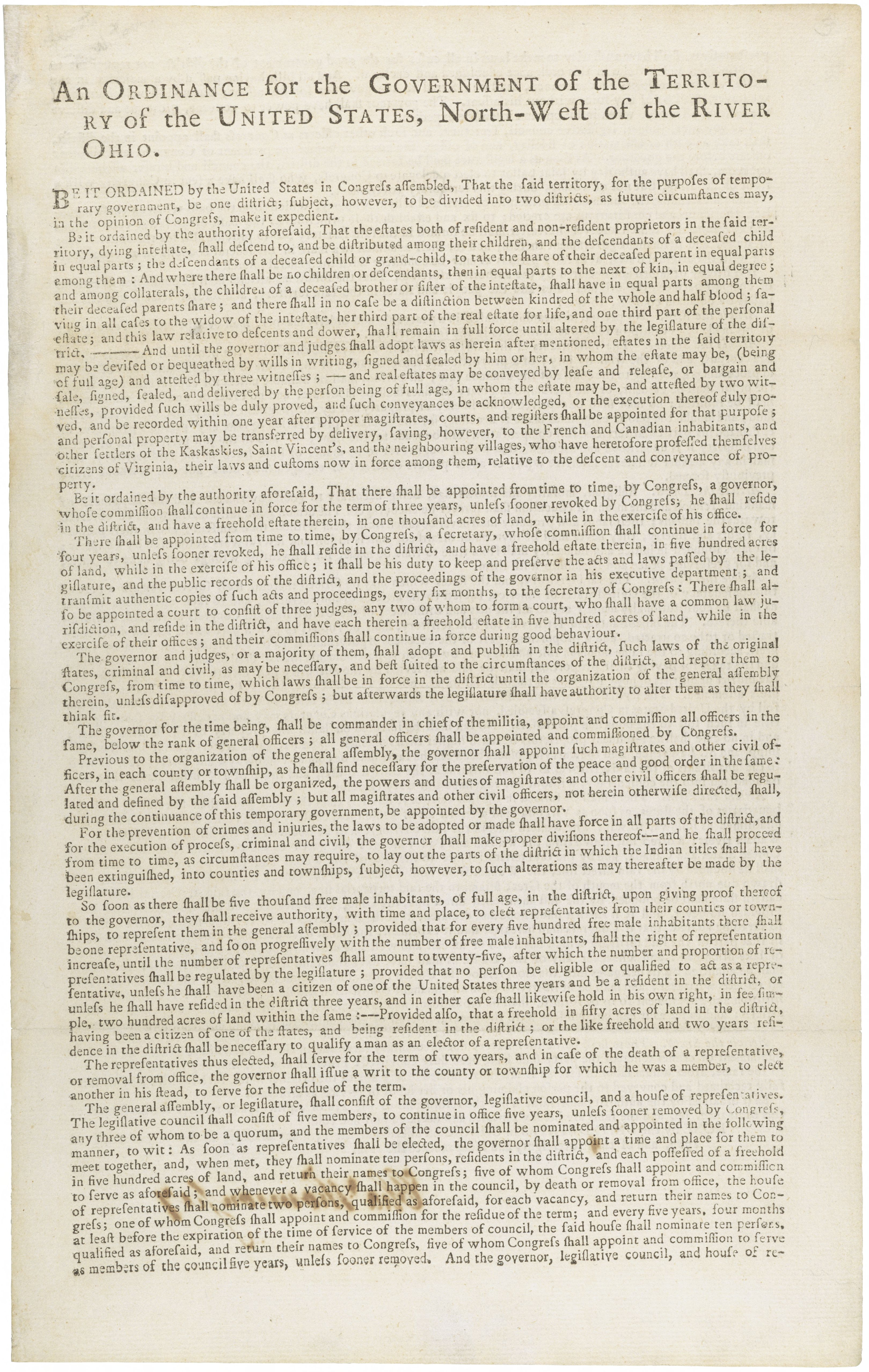
Northwest Ordinance

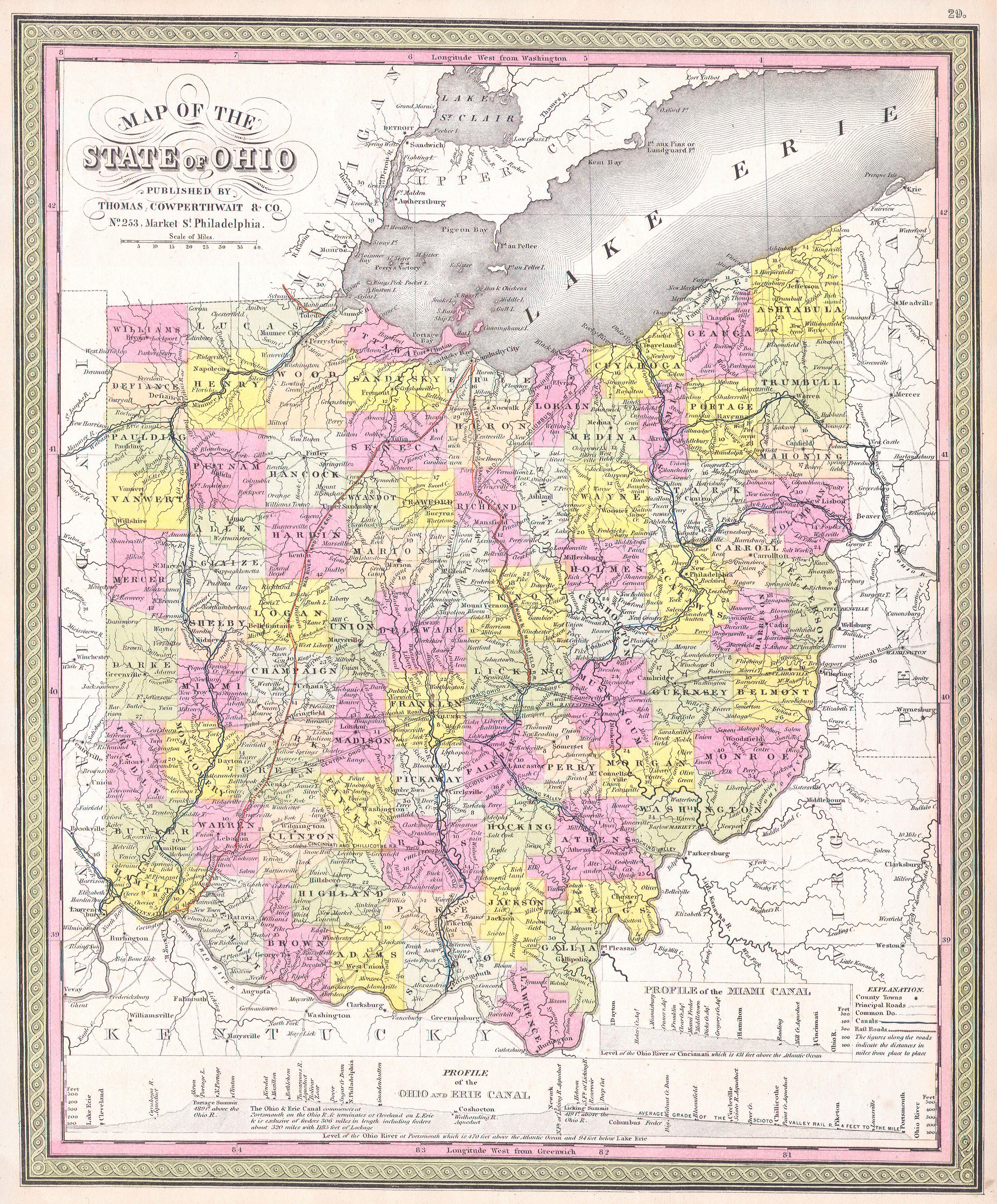
Map of the State of Ohio in 1850

Ohio's 1803 Constitution continued the Northwest Ordinance's prohibition of slavery north of the Ohio River. Many Ohioans had come from Southern states that allowed slavery and were not willing to grant rights to African Americans.

The 1804 law required black and mulatto residents to have a certificate from the Clerk of the Court that they were free. Employers who violated were fined $10 to $50 split between informer and state.

Under the 1807 law, black and mulatto residents required a $500 bond for good behavior and against becoming a township charge. The township Overseer of the Poor were duty bound to expel those without a bond. Harboring, employing or concealing one without a bond was a $100 penalty split between informer and state. It also forbade a Negro to be a witness against a white person.

Ohio blacks could not vote, hold office, serve in the state militia, or serve jury duty. Blacks were not permitted in the public school system until 1848, when a law was passed that permitted communities to establish segregated schools.

In 1837, black Ohioans met in a statewide convention seeking repeal of the Black Laws.

The Black Laws were partially repealed in 1849, ending the bond-posting requirement, for Free Soil Party support of Democrats. Cuyahoga County delegates blocked antiblack provisions from the 1851 constitution. Under the federal Fugitive Slave Act of 1850, free Blacks were kidnapped and conscripted into slavery, as suspected fugitive slaves had no rights in court and could not defend themselves against accusations.

== Effects ==
Enforcement of Ohio's Black Laws appear to have been generally episodic and arbitrary, lightly enforced on the whole, but occasionally used to threaten and intimidate black residents of the state. In 1818 Wayne Township, where Portsmouth was located at the time, the township's constable was paid $4.18 to warn out blacks and mulattos. In 1829 Cincinnati, a race riot destroyed many homes in the black section of the city and exiled nearly half of the city's black population, some to Canada. According to Nelson Evans, on Black Friday, January 21, 1830, in Portsmouth, all 80 black people were deported. The Portsmouth expulsions led to the establishment of a black community in Huston Hollow with the Underground Railroad. In 1846, the Randolph Freedpeople were blocked from settling on land granted to them despite having posted bonds.

== See also ==
- Black Codes (United States)
