= Cincinnati Commercial Tribune =

American daily newspaper (1896–1930)

The Cincinnati Commercial Tribune was a major daily newspaper in Cincinnati, Ohio, formed in 1896, and folded in 1930.

The Commercial Tribune was created in 1896 by the merger of the longstanding Commercial Gazette and newcomer Cincinnati Tribune. Murat Halstead was a well-known editor of The Commercial and The Commercial Gazette in the 1860s-1880s. A representative of John Roll McLean, owner of The Cincinnati Enquirer, acquired the paper in 1911, and continued to operate it as a Republican paper (as opposed to the Democratic Party slant of the Enquirer). The decline in Republican fortunes and the financial situation of the paper in general led to its close in December 1930.

== History ==
The Cincinnati Commercial debuted on October 2, 1843. The original publishers were Greeley Curtis and Hastings. Hastings did not stay long with the paper, and Curtis later brought on his brother-in-law J.W.S. Browne as a partner. Murat Halstead joined the Commercial in 1853, and later obtained some ownership, and a controlling interest by 1867. Partner M.D. Potter bought land to build the Cincinnati Commercial Building at the corner of Fourth and Race in 1859.

== Commercial Gazette ==
One of the predecessors of the Tribune, the Commercial Gazette, was created in 1883 from the merger of the Cincinnati Commercial and Daily Gazette.

The Gazette once claimed a lineage dating from the founding of Centinel of the Northwest Territory in 1793, though in reality that entity is considered to have moved to Chillicothe, Ohio with its owner in 1800. More accurately, Thomas Palmer published the first issue of the Cincinnati Gazette on July 15, 1815, which he merged with the pre-existing Liberty Hall later that year, a paper which had been founded in 1804. A daily paper (the Daily Gazette) first appeared on July 25, 1827.

== See also ==
- Charles Hammond
