= Cincinnati riots of 1855 =

Series of riots occurring in Cincinnati in 1855

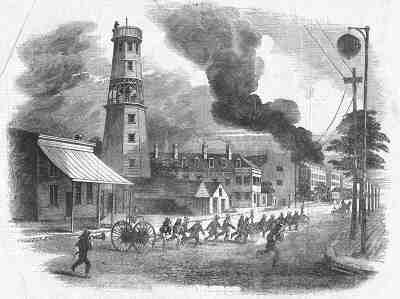
- View of Cincinnati, during the Nativist Riots of April 1855
- Date: April 1855
- Location: Cincinnati, Ohio
- Caused by: Anti-Catholicism; Nativism; Instability (political and economic)
- Result: The election violence and failure of the nativists to form an alliance with anti-slavery activists discredited the party in the eyes of many citizens and led to the demise of the movement. The riots meant the end of the Know Nothing party in Cincinnati

Parties
Nativists: Know-Nothing Party; Anglo-American rioters	German-American residents: Militias

The Cincinnati Riots of 1855 were clashes between "nativists" and German-Americans. The nativists supported J. D. Taylor, the mayoral candidate for the anti-immigrant American Party, also known as the Know-Nothing Party. During the riots, German-Americans erected barricades in the streets leading into their Over-the-Rhine neighborhood, and fired a cannon over the heads of a mob of nativists attacking them.

== Riots ==
In the April 1855 elections, the Know Nothings nominated a slate of candidates with James Taylor, the populist anti-immigrant and anti-Catholic editor of the Cincinnati Times, as candidate for mayor. Taylor's inflammatory attacks on immigrants caused rising tension in the city, with fighting breaking out on election day. The day after, a mob of nativists attacked the German Over-the-Rhine neighborhood, causing a riot in which several men died. The mob managed to destroy the ballots in two German wards. The Germans organized into militia units, built a barricade across Vine Street, and successfully defended their territory.

== Reactions ==
After an uneasy peace had been restored, electoral officials declared that the Democratic candidate had been elected mayor. The anti-nativist press made the most of the riots. The Democracy called them "one of the most dastardly and villainous acts ever perpetrated in any community". The Enquirer said it could "find no language capable of expressing our indignation. ... Words could but faintly translate the abhorence we feel that the ark of our safety, the very covenant of our freedom, should be ruthlessly seized by sacrilegious hands, and destroyed before our very eyes". The Columbus Statesman described the nativists as "the reckless, midnight, oath-bound order" and asked "Has the Protestant religion come to so low a condition that it requires such means to give it character and support?"

The Republicans, who had seen the Catholic issue as a way of gaining the votes of Protestant immigrants, were dismayed. Editor Joseph Medill called the Know Nothing leaders "knaves and asses". The election violence and failure of the nativists to form an alliance with anti-slavery activists discredited the party in the eyes of many citizens and led to the demise of the movement.

The riots meant the end of the Know Nothing party in Cincinnati.

== See also ==
- List of incidents of civil unrest in Cincinnati
- List of incidents of civil unrest in the United States
- Related Historical Fiction:

The Cause of Henry Schnell ISBN 9798370291494
