= Charles Hammond (lawyer and journalist) =

American journalist, lawyer, and politician

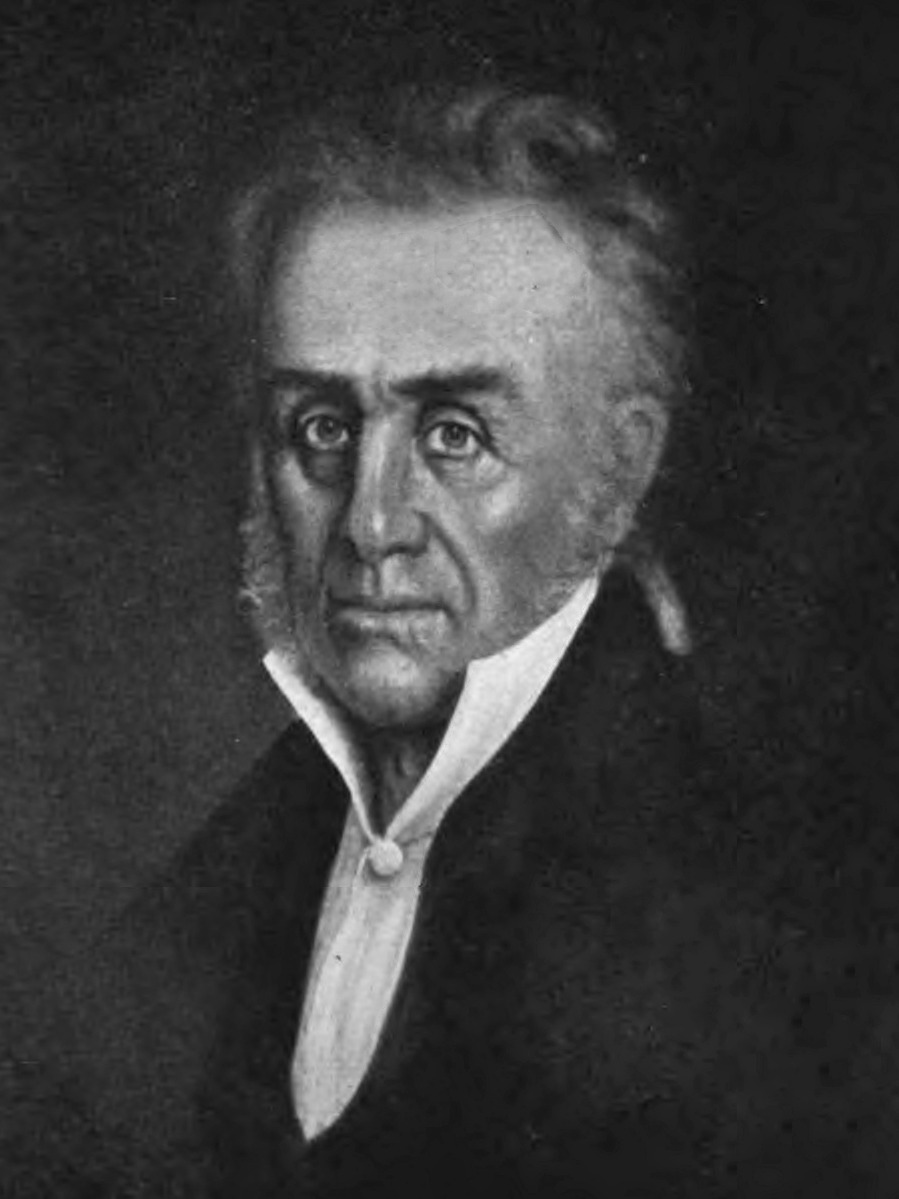
- from a painting in the office of the Reporter of the Ohio Supreme Court in Columbus

Member of the Ohio Senate from the Belmont County district
- In office December 6, 1813 – December 3, 1815
- Preceded by: James Caldwell
- Succeeded by: John Patterson

Personal details
- Born: September 19, 1779 Baltimore County, Maryland, U.S.
- Died: April 3, 1840 (aged 60) Cincinnati, Ohio, U.S.
- Party: Federalist
- Spouse: Sally Tillinghast

Charles Hammond (September 19, 1779 – April 3, 1840) was a lawyer, newspaper editor, and state legislator in Ohio in the early nineteenth century. He attained renown in his time as both a lawyer and a journalist, but was largely neglected later. Hammond is best known today for his role as the intellectual leader of Ohio's ultimately failed opposition to the Second Bank of the United States.

== Early life and education ==
Hammond was born on September 19, 1779, to George and Elizabeth (née Wells) Hammond. The family lived in Baltimore County, Maryland, at the time of Hammond's birth, but moved to Brooke County in western Virginia (now in West Virginia) in 1785. After a very brief (two-day) attempt at learning the printing business in 1798, Hammond began studying law under Virginia lawyer Philip Doddridge in 1799.

== Career ==
Hammond received his license to practice law in Virginia in 1801, and later that year acquired a license to practice in the Northwest Territory. In November 1801, he was appointed as prosecuting attorney in Belmont County, Ohio.

In 1804, Hammond moved to Wheeling, where he lived, practiced law, and wrote newspaper essays for five years. He returned to Belmont County in 1809.

In 1813, Hammond began publishing a newspaper, the Ohio Federalist, in St. Clairsville, Ohio. That same year, Hammond was elected to a position in the Ohio Senate, serving a two-year term until 1815. Hammond was elected to the lower house of the Ohio legislature in 1816, and re-elected in 1817, 1818, and 1820.

Hammond did not play a very prominent role as a legislator until controversy arose between Ohio and the Second Bank of the United States. This controversy thrust him into prominence for the next several years.

Together with John Crafts Wright, Hammond represented Ohio and Auditor Ralph Osborn in the litigation that followed on the state's forcible collection of state taxes from the federal Bank. The high-stakes legal wrangling lasted from late 1819 until early 1824, when it came to end with a loss for Hammond in the Supreme Court of the United States in Osborn v. Bank of the United States. Hammond played an important role in the 1824 presidential campaign of Henry Clay - who had been opposing counsel representing the federal Bank in the litigation with Ohio.

Hammond was nominated for a seat on the Ohio Supreme Court in 1822, but was rejected by the Ohio legislature. He was appointed official reporter for the Ohio Supreme Court and held that role until he retired from the practice of law in 1838. Near the close of his administration, John Quincy Adams offered Henry Clay a seat on the United States Supreme Court. Clay declined, and the seat was offered to Hammond, who also declined.

Hammond became the editor of the semi-weekly Cincinnati Gazette in 1825. Until his death in 1840, Hammond published a steady stream of commentary on law, politics, and public affairs. Speaking of him decades later, William Henry Smith, who coordinated and managed the Associated Press, described Hammond as "the most distinguished American editor of his day."

== Personal life ==
Hammond married Sarah (Sally) Tillinghast in 1803. Charles and Sally had a daughter, Almer (b. Oct. 12, 1813), and a son, Henry. They remained married until Sally's death in 1826, which followed a seven-year period of poor health. Some years later, he married again. Of his second wife, Weisenburger says only that she was "a sister of Thomas and Moses Moorehead of Zanesville."

== Death ==
Charles Hammond died on April 3, 1840. He was memorialized in a poem by his assistant editor at the Gazette, William D. Gallagher, which included the lines:

A keen perception of the right, A lasting hatred of the wrong,
An arm that failed not in the fight, A spirit strong,
Array’d him with the weak and low, No matter what the opposing pow’r
And gave a terror to his blow In battle's hour.

He asked no leader in the fight; No “times and seasons” sought to know;
But, when convinced his cause was right, He struck the blow.
Praise to his virtues!—greenly keep The memory of the race he ran!
Ne’er let the LIVING LESSON sleep Of such a man!

== Sources ==
- Ellis, Richard E (2007). Aggressive Nationalism: McCulloch v. Maryland and the Foundation of Federal Authority in the Young Republic. Oxford University Press. ISBN 9780195323566. OCLC 190865208.
- Smith, William Henry (1885). Charles Hammond and his relations to Henry Clay and John Quincy Adams or, Constitutional limitations and the contest for freedom of speech and the press. An address delivered before the Chicago Historical Society, May 20, 1884. Chicago Historical Society.
- Weisenburger, Francis Phelps (1934). "Charles Hammond: The First Great Journalist of the Old Northwest". Ohio Archaeological and Historical Quarterly. 43: 338. Archived from the original on 2014-11-01.
- Randall, Emilius Oviatt (1897). "Reporters of the Supreme Court". Bench and Bar of Ohio: a Compendium of History and Biography. Vol. 2. Chicago: Century Publishing and Engraving Company.
- Coggeshall, William T. (1860). Poets and Poetry of the West with Biographical and Critical Notices. Columbus: Follett, Foster and Company. p. 68.
