= Leo Frank =

Jewish-American lynching victim (1884–1915)

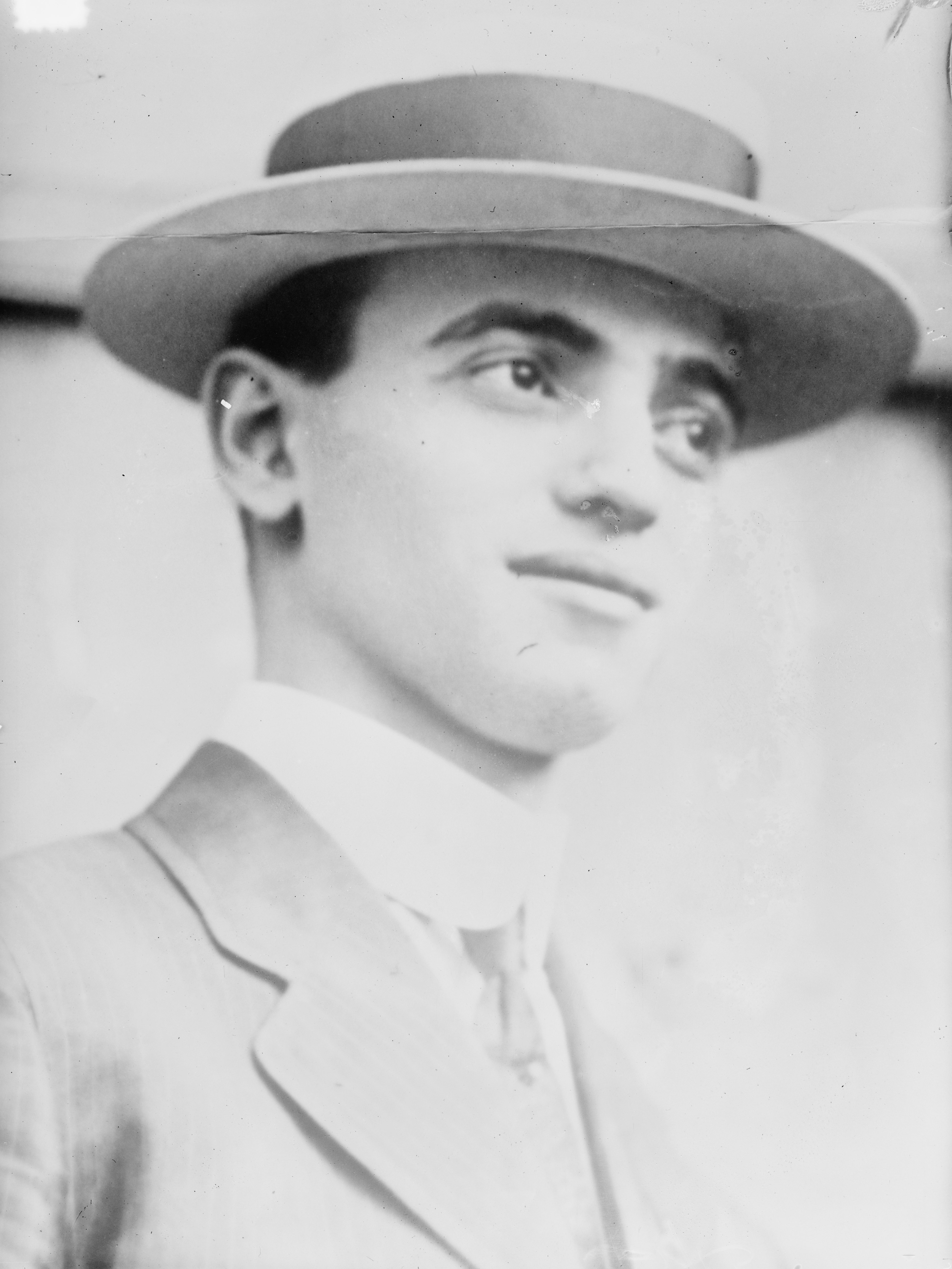
- Frank, c. 1910–1915
- Born: Leo Max Frank; April 17, 1884; Cuero, Texas, U.S.
- Died: August 17, 1915 (aged 31); Marietta, Georgia, U.S.
- Cause of death: Lynching
- Resting place: New Mount Carmel Cemetery, Glendale, New York; 40.69269°N 73.88115°W
- Education: Cornell University (BEng); Eberhard Faber (Apprentice)
- Employer(s): National Pencil Company, Atlanta (1908–1915)
- Criminal charge: Convicted on August 25, 1913 for the murder of Mary Phagan
- Criminal penalty: Death by hanging (1913); commuted to life imprisonment (1915)
- Spouse: Lucille Selig (m. 1910)

Leo Max Frank (April 17, 1884 – August 17, 1915) was an American lynching victim wrongly convicted of the murder of 13-year-old Mary Phagan, an employee in a factory in Atlanta, Georgia, where he was the superintendent. Frank's trial, conviction, and unsuccessful appeals attracted national attention. His kidnapping from prison and lynching became the focus of social, regional, political, and racial concerns, particularly regarding antisemitism. Modern researchers agree that Frank was innocent. (Note: "The modern historical consensus, as exemplified in the Dinnerstein book, is that ... Leo Frank was an innocent man convicted at an unfair trial.")

Born to a Jewish family in Texas, Frank was raised in New York and earned a degree in mechanical engineering from Cornell University in 1906 before moving to Atlanta in 1908. Marrying Lucille Selig (who became Lucille Frank) in 1910, he involved himself with the city's Jewish community and was elected president of the Atlanta chapter of the B'nai B'rith, a Jewish fraternal organization, in 1912. At that time, there were growing concerns regarding child labor at factories. One of these children was Mary Phagan, who worked at the National Pencil Company where Frank was director. The girl was strangled on April 26, 1913, and found dead in the factory's cellar the next morning. Two notes, made to look as if she had written them, were found beside her body. Based on the mention of a "night witch", they implicated the night watchman, Newt Lee. Over the course of their investigations, the police arrested several men, including Lee, Frank, and Jim Conley, a janitor at the factory.

On May 24, 1913, Frank was indicted on a charge of murder and the trial opened at Fulton County Superior Court on July 28. The prosecution relied heavily on the testimony of Conley, who described himself as an accomplice in the aftermath of the murder, and who the defense at the trial argued was, in fact, the murderer, as many historians and researchers now believe. A guilty verdict was announced on August 25. Frank and his lawyers made a series of unsuccessful appeals; their final appeal to the Supreme Court of the United States failed in April 1915. Considering arguments from both sides as well as evidence not available at trial, Governor John M. Slaton commuted Frank's sentence from death to life imprisonment.

The case attracted national press attention and many reporters deemed the conviction a travesty. Within Georgia, this outside criticism fueled antisemitism and hatred toward Frank. On August 16, 1915, he was kidnapped from prison by a group of armed men, and lynched at Marietta, Mary Phagan's hometown, the next morning. The new governor vowed to punish the lynchers, who included prominent Marietta citizens, but nobody was charged. In 1986, the Georgia State Board of Pardons and Paroles issued a pardon in recognition of the state's failures—including to protect Frank and preserve his opportunity to appeal—but took no stance on Frank's guilt or innocence. The case has inspired books, movies, a play, a musical, and a TV miniseries.

Many African Americans opposed what historian Nancy MacLean described as a "virulently racist" characterization of Jim Conley, who was black, by the Frank defense. She wrote that, "the black press later condemned Frank's lynching as they did all lynching."

His case spurred the creation of the Anti-Defamation League and the resurgence of the Ku Klux Klan.

== Background ==
=== Social and economic conditions ===
In the early 20th century, Atlanta, Georgia's capital city, underwent significant economic and social change. To serve a growing economy based on manufacturing and commerce, many people left the countryside to relocate in Atlanta. Men from the traditional rural society felt it degrading that women were moving to the city to work in factories.

During this era, Atlanta's rabbis and Jewish community leaders helped to resolve animosity toward Jews. In the half-century from 1895, David Marx was a prominent figure in the city. In order to aid assimilation, Marx's Reform temple adopted Americanized appearances. Friction developed between the city's German Jews, who were integrated, and Russian Jews who had recently immigrated. Marx said the new Russian Jews were "barbaric and ignorant" and believed their presence would create new antisemitic attitudes and a situation which made possible Frank's guilty verdict. At that time, many Jews felt an undercurrent of anti-Jew sentiment. (Note: A 1900 Jewish newspaper in Atlanta wrote that "no one knows better than publishers of Jewish papers how widespread is this prejudice; but these publishers do not and will not tell what they know of the smooth talking Jew-haters, because it would widen the breech [sic] already existent.") Marx believed that "in isolated instances there is no prejudice entertained for the individual Jew, but there exists wide-spread and deep seated prejudice against Jews as an entire people." (Note: Dinnerstein wrote, "Men wore neither skullcaps nor prayer shawls, traditional Jewish holidays that the Orthodox celebrated on two days were observed by Marx and his followers for only one, and religious services were conducted on Sundays rather than on Saturdays.") (Note: Lindemann writes, "As in the rest of the nation at this time, there were new sources of friction between Jews and Gentiles, and in truth the worries of the German-Jewish elite about the negative impact of the newly arriving eastern European Jews in the city were not without foundation.")

In April 1913, anti-Jewish rhetoric surfaced at a child labor conference in Atlanta when some speakers linked the issue to Jewish factory ownership. Historian Leonard Dinnerstein summarized Atlanta's situation in 1913 as follows:

The pathological conditions in the city menaced the home, the state, the schools, the churches, and, in the words of a contemporary Southern sociologist, the 'wholesome industrial life.' The institutions of the city were obviously unfit to handle urban problems. Against this background, the murder of a young girl in 1913 triggered a violent reaction of mass aggression, hysteria, and prejudice.

=== Early life ===
Leo Max Frank was born in Cuero, Texas on April 17, 1884, to Rudolph Frank and Rachel "Rae" Jacobs, who were both of German-Jewish descent. The family moved to Brooklyn when Leo was three months old. He attended New York City public schools and graduated from Pratt Institute in 1902. He then attended Cornell University, where he studied mechanical engineering. At Cornell, Frank was a member of the H. Morse Stephens Debate Club. After graduating in 1906, he worked briefly as a draftsman and as a testing engineer.

At the invitation of his uncle Moses Frank, Leo traveled to Atlanta for two weeks in late October 1907, to meet a delegation of investors for a position with the National Pencil Company, a manufacturing plant in which Moses was a major shareholder. Frank accepted the position, and traveled to Germany to study pencil manufacturing at the Eberhard Faber pencil factory. After a nine-month apprenticeship, Frank returned to the United States and began working at the National Pencil Company in August 1908. Frank became superintendent of the factory the following month, earning $180 per month plus a portion of the factory's profits.

Frank was introduced to Lucille Selig shortly after he arrived in Atlanta. She came from a prominent, upper-middle class Jewish family of industrialists who, two generations earlier, had founded the first synagogue in Atlanta. (Note: Levi Cohen, from her maternal lineage, had participated in founding the first synagogue in Atlanta.) They married in November 1910. Frank described his married life as happy.

In 1912, Frank was elected president of the Atlanta chapter of the B'nai B'rith, a Jewish fraternal organization. The Jewish community in Atlanta was the largest in the Southern United States, and the Franks belonged to a cultured and philanthropic community whose leisure pursuits included opera and bridge. Although the Southern United States was not specifically known for its antisemitism, Frank's northern culture and Jewish faith added to the sense that he was different.

== Murder of Mary Phagan ==
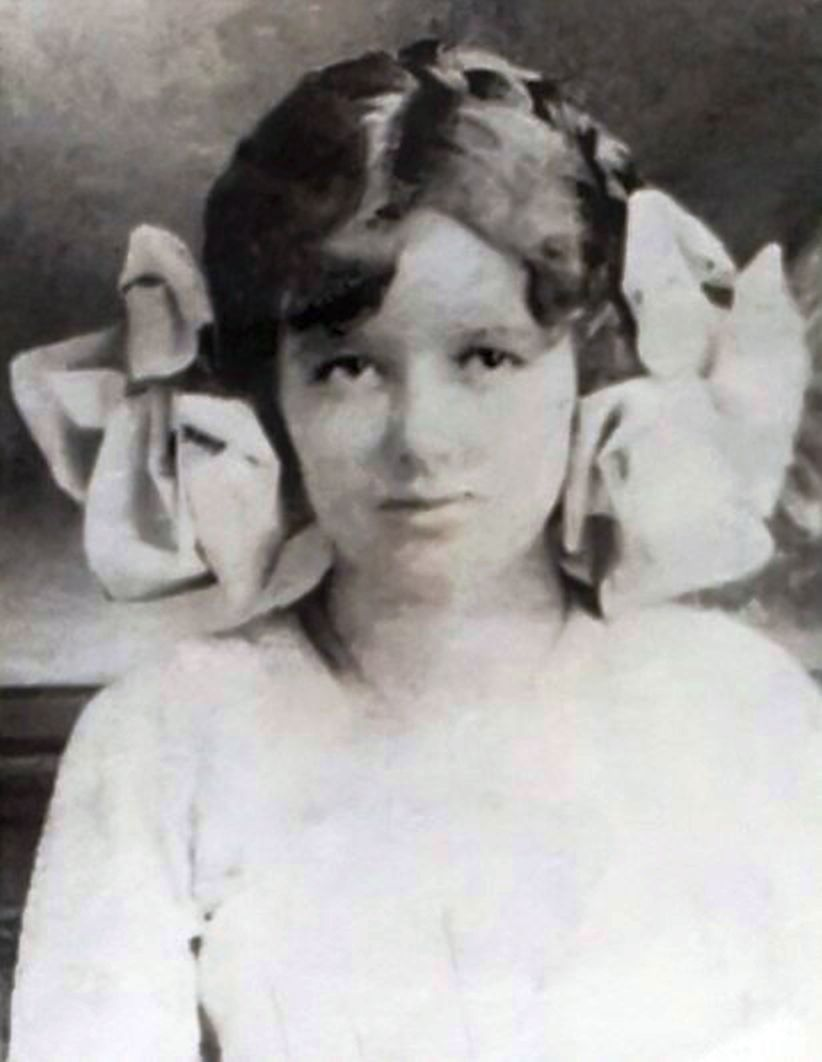
Mary Phagan

=== Phagan's early life ===
Mary Phagan was born on June 1, 1899, into a Georgia family of tenant farmers. Her father died before she was born. Shortly after Mary's birth, her mother, Frances Phagan, moved the family back to their hometown of Marietta, Georgia. During or after 1907, they again relocated to East Point, Georgia, in southwest Atlanta, where Frances opened a boarding house. Phagan left school at age 10 to work part-time in a textile mill. In 1912, after her mother married John William Coleman, the family moved into the city of Atlanta. That spring, Phagan took a job with the National Pencil Company, where she earned ten cents an hour operating a knurling machine that inserted rubber erasers into the metal tips of pencils, and worked 55 hours per week. (Note: Oney writes, "Ordinarily, she was scheduled to work fifty-five hours. During the past six days, however, she'd been needed only for two abbreviated shifts. The sealed envelope awaiting her in her employer's office safe contained just $1.20.") She worked across the hallway from Leo Frank's office.

=== Discovery of Phagan's body ===
On April 21, 1913, Phagan was laid off due to a materials shortage. Around noon on April 26, she went to the factory to claim her pay. The next day, shortly before 3:00 a.m., the factory's night watchman, Newt Lee, went to the factory basement to use the toilet. After leaving the toilet, Lee discovered Phagan's body in the rear of the basement near an incinerator and called the police.

Her dress was up around her waist and a strip from her petticoat had been torn off and wrapped around her neck. Her face was blackened and scratched, and her head was bruised and battered. A 7-foot (2.1 m) strip of 1/4-inch (6.4 mm) wrapping cord was tied into a loop around her neck, buried 1/4 in (6.4 mm) deep, showing that she had been strangled. Her underwear was still around her hips, but stained with blood and torn open. Her skin was covered with ashes and dirt from the floor, initially making it appear to first responding officers that she and her assailant had struggled in the basement.

A service ramp at the rear of the basement led to a sliding door that opened into an alley; the police found the door had been tampered with so it could be opened without unlocking it. Later examination found bloody fingerprints on the door, as well as a metal pipe that had been used as a crowbar. Some evidence at the crime scene was improperly handled by the police investigators: a trail in the dirt (from the elevator shaft) along which police believed Phagan had been dragged was trampled; the footprints were never identified.

Two notes were found in a pile of rubbish by Phagan's head, and became known as the "murder notes". One said: "he said he wood love me land down play like the night witch did it but that long tall black negro did boy his slef." The other said, "mam that negro hire down here did this i went to make water and he push me down that hole a long tall negro black that hoo it wase long sleam tall negro i write while play with me." The phrase "night witch" was thought to mean "night watch[man]"; when the notes were initially read aloud, Lee, who was black, said: "Boss, it looks like they are trying to lay it on me." (Note: Lee said that these were his words in his evidence later at the trial.) Lee was arrested that morning based on these notes and his apparent familiarity with the body – he stated that the girl was white, when the police, because of the filth and darkness in the basement, initially thought she was black. A trail leading back to the elevator suggested to police that the body had been moved by Lee.

=== Police investigation ===
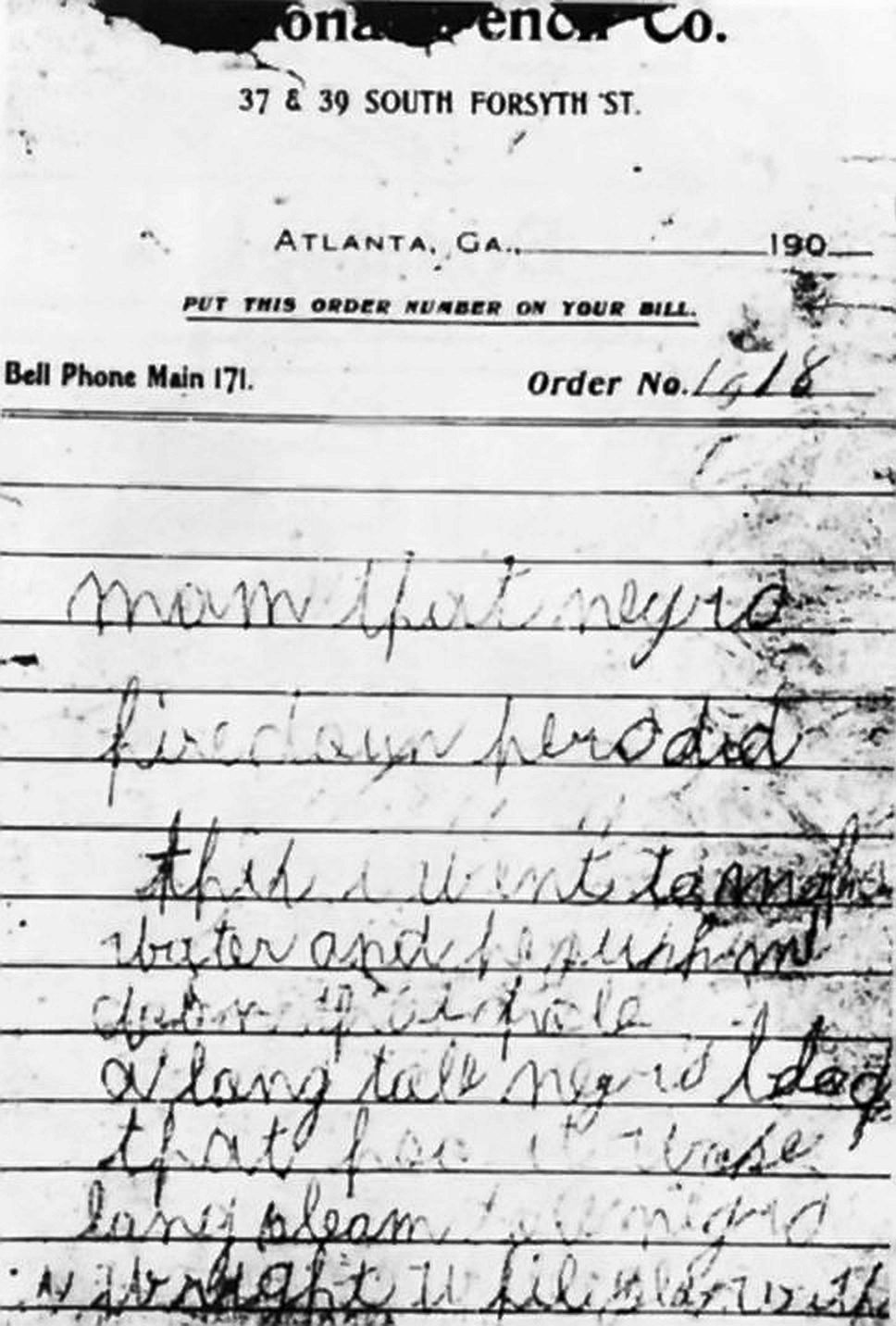
One of the two murder notes found near the body

In addition to Lee, the police arrested a friend of Phagan's for the crime. Gradually, the police became convinced that these were not the culprits. By Monday, the police had theorized that the murder occurred on the second floor (the same as Frank's office) based on hair found on a lathe and what appeared to be blood on the ground of the second floor.

Just after 4 am on Sunday, April 27 after the discovery of Phagan's body, both Newt Lee and the police unsuccessfully tried to telephone Frank. The police contacted him later that morning and he agreed to accompany them to the factory. When the police arrived after 7 a.m. without telling the specifics of what happened at the factory, Frank seemed extremely nervous, trembling, and pale; his voice was hoarse, and he was rubbing his hands and asking questions before the police could answer. Frank said he was not familiar with the name Mary Phagan and would need to check his payroll book. The detectives took Frank to the morgue to see Phagan's body and then to the factory, where Frank viewed the crime scene and walked the police through the entire building. Frank returned home about 10:45 a.m. At this point, Frank was not considered a suspect.

On Monday, April 28, Frank, accompanied by his attorney, Luther Rosser, gave a written deposition to the police that provided a brief timeline of his activities on Saturday. He said Phagan was in his office between 12:05 and 12:10 p.m., that Lee had arrived at 4 p.m. but was asked to return later, and that Frank had a confrontation with ex-employee James Gantt at 6 p.m. as Frank was leaving and Lee was arriving. Frank explained that Lee's time card for Sunday morning had several gaps (Lee was supposed to punch in every half-hour) that Frank had missed when he discussed the time card with police on Sunday. At Rosser's insistence, Frank exposed his body to demonstrate that he had no cuts or injuries and the police found no blood on the suit that Frank said he had worn on Saturday. The police found no blood stains on the laundry at Frank's house.

Frank then met with N. V. Darley, his assistant, and Harry Scott of the Pinkerton National Detective Agency, whom Frank hired to investigate the case and prove his innocence. The Pinkerton detectives would investigate many leads, ranging from crime scene evidence to allegations of sexual misconduct on the part of Frank. The Pinkertons were required to submit duplicates of all evidence to the police, including any that hurt Frank's case. Unbeknownst to Frank, however, was Scott's close ties with the police, particularly his best friend, detective John Black, who believed in Frank's guilt from the outset. (Note: Oney writes: "Yet where Frank may have harbored a hidden agenda, Scott brought with him an undeniable conflict of interests...he was closely tied to the police. Private investigators operating in the city were required to submit duplicate copies of their reports to the department, even if the documents implicated a client. This much Scott would reveal to Frank. What he would not reveal, however, was that his allegiance to the force went deeper than the statutes required, that indeed, one of his best friends, someone with whom he often worked in tandem, was the individual who from the outset had believed Frank guilty: Detective John Black.)

On Tuesday, April 29, Black went to Lee's residence at 11 a.m. looking for evidence, and found a blood-smeared shirt at the bottom of a burn barrel. The blood was smeared high up on the armpits and the shirt smelled unused, suggesting to the police that it was a plant. The detectives, suspicious of Frank due to his nervous behavior throughout his interviews, believed that Frank had arranged the plant.

Frank was subsequently arrested around 11:30 a.m. at the factory. Steve Oney states that "no single development had persuaded ... [the police] that Leo Frank had murdered Mary Phagan. Instead, to the cumulative weight of Sunday's suspicions and Monday's misgivings had been added several last factors that tipped the scale against the superintendent." These factors were the rejection of rumors that Phagan had been seen on the streets, making Frank the last person to admit seeing Phagan; the dropped charges against two suspects; Frank's meeting with the Pinkertons; and a "shifting view of Newt Lee's role in the affair." The police were convinced Lee was involved as Frank's accomplice and that Frank was trying to implicate him. To bolster their case, the police staged a confrontation between Lee and Frank while both were still in custody; there were conflicting accounts of this meeting, but the police interpreted it as further implicating Frank.

On Wednesday, April 30, a coroner's inquest was held. Frank testified about his activities on Saturday and other witnesses produced corroboration. A young man said that Phagan had complained to him about Frank. Several former employees spoke of Frank flirting with other women; one said she was actually propositioned. The detectives admitted that "they so far had obtained no conclusive evidence or clues in the baffling mystery ...". Lee and Frank were both ordered to be detained.

In May, the detective William J. Burns traveled to Atlanta to offer further assistance in the case. However, his Burns Agency withdrew from the case later that month. C. W. Tobie, a detective from the Chicago affiliate who was assigned to the case, said that the agency "came down here to investigate a murder case, not to engage in petty politic[s]." The agency quickly became disillusioned with the many societal implications of the case, most notably the notion that Frank was able to evade prosecution due to his being a rich Jew, buying off the police and paying for private detectives.

=== James "Jim" Conley ===
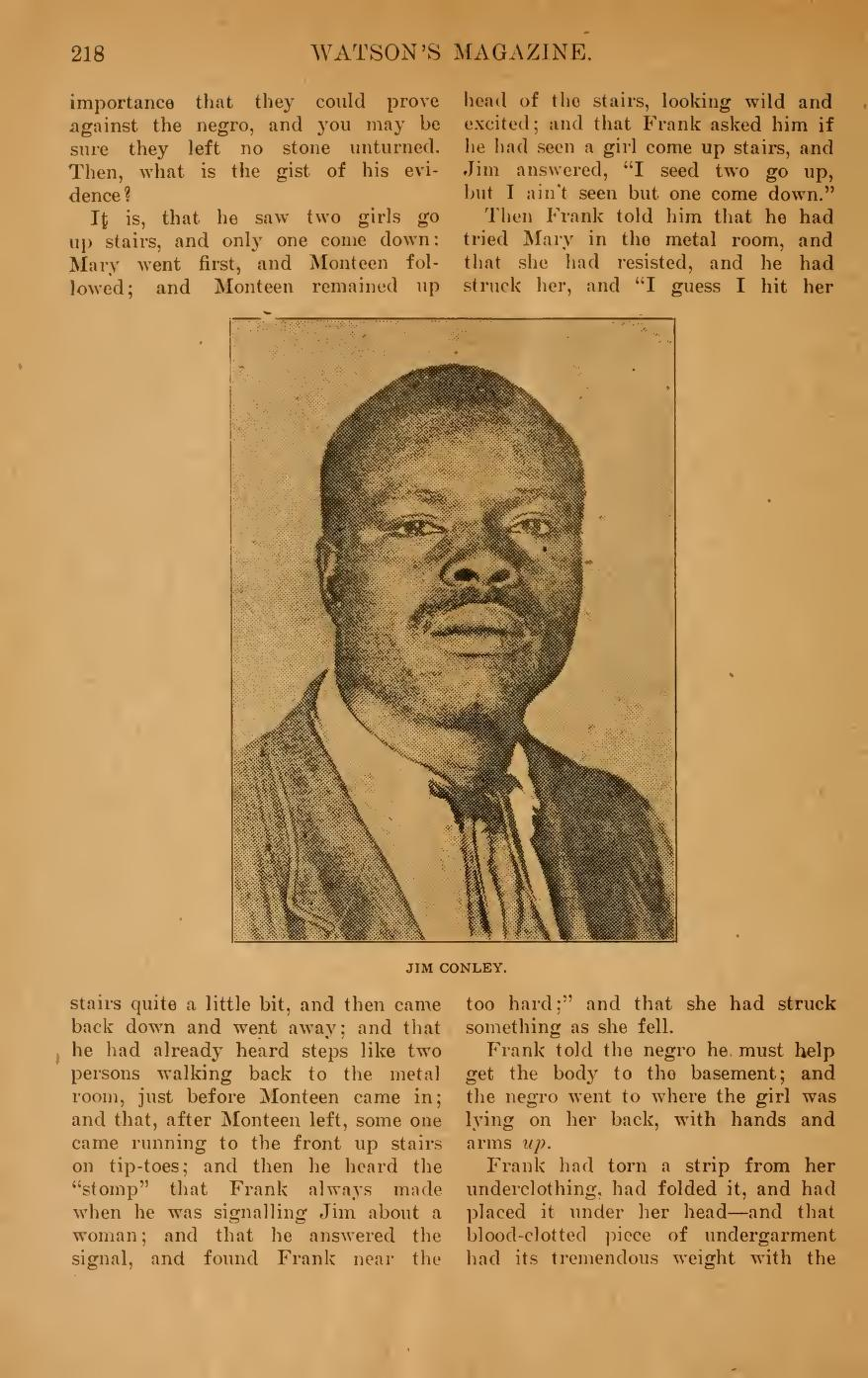
Jim Conley as shown in the August 1915 issue of Watson's Magazine

The prosecution based much of its case on the testimony of Jim Conley, the factory's janitor, who is believed by many historians and researchers to be the actual murderer. (Note: For example: "The best evidence now available indicates that the real murderer of Mary Phagan was Jim Conley, perhaps because she, encountering him after she left Frank's office, refused to give him her pay envelope, and he, in a drunken stupor, killed her to get it." "The city police, publicly committed to the theory of Frank's guilt, and hounded by the demand for a conviction, resorted to the basest methods in collecting evidence. A Negro suspect [Conley], later implicated by evidence overwhelmingly more incriminating than any produced against Frank, was thrust aside by the cry for the blood of the 'Jew Pervert.'") The police had arrested Conley on May 1 after he had been seen washing red stains out of a blue work shirt; detectives examined it for blood, but determined that it was rust as Conley had claimed, and returned it. Conley was still in police custody two weeks later when he gave his first formal statement. He said that, on the day of the murder, he had been visiting saloons, shooting dice, and drinking. His story was called into question when a witness told detectives that "a black negro ... dressed in dark blue clothing and hat" had been seen in the lobby of the factory on the day of the murder. Further investigation determined that Conley could read and write, and there were similarities in his spelling with that found on the murder notes. On May 24, he admitted he had written the notes, swearing that Frank had called him to his office the day before the murder and told him to write them. After testing Conley again on his spelling – he spelled "night watchman" as "night witch" – the police were convinced he had written the notes. They were skeptical about the rest of his story, not only because it implied premeditation by Frank, but also because it suggested that Frank had confessed to Conley and involved him.

In a new affidavit (his second affidavit and third statement), Conley admitted he had lied about his Friday meeting with Frank. He said he had met Frank on the street on Saturday, and was told to follow him to the factory. Frank told him to hide in a wardrobe to avoid being seen by two women who were visiting Frank in his office. He said Frank dictated the murder notes for him to write, gave him cigarettes, then told him to leave the factory. Afterward, Conley said he went out drinking and saw a movie. He said he did not learn of the murder until he went to work on Monday.

The police were satisfied with the new story, and The Atlanta Journal, Atlanta Constitution and Atlanta Georgian all gave the story front-page coverage. Three officials of the pencil company were not convinced and said so to the Journal. They contended that Conley had followed another employee into the building, intending to rob her, but found Phagan was an easier target. The police placed little credence in the officials' theory, but had no explanation for the failure to locate Phagan's purse that other witnesses had testified she carried that day. They were also concerned that Conley did not mention that he was aware a crime had been committed when he wrote the notes, suggesting Frank had simply dictated the notes to Conley arbitrarily. To resolve their doubts, the police attempted on May 28 to arrange a confrontation between Frank and Conley. Frank exercised his right not to meet without his attorney, who was out of town. The police were quoted in The Atlanta Constitution saying that this refusal was an indication of Frank's guilt, and the meeting never took place.

On May 29, Conley was interrogated for four hours. His new affidavit said that Frank told him, "he had picked up a girl back there and let her fall and that her head hit against something." Conley said he and Frank took the body to the basement via the elevator, then returned to Frank's office where the murder notes were dictated. Conley then hid in the wardrobe after the two had returned to the office. He said Frank gave him $200, but took it back, saying, "Let me have that and I will make it all right with you Monday if I live and nothing happens." Conley's affidavit concluded, "The reason I have not told this before is I thought Mr. Frank would get out and help me out and I decided to tell the whole truth about this matter." At trial, Conley changed his story concerning the $200. He said Frank decided to withhold the money until Conley had burned Phagan's body in the basement furnace.

The Georgian hired William Manning Smith to represent Conley for $40. Smith was known for specializing in representing black clients, and had successfully defended a black man against a rape accusation made by a white woman. He had also taken an elderly black woman's civil case as far as the Georgia Supreme Court. Although Smith believed Conley had told the truth in his final affidavit, he became concerned that Conley was giving long jailhouse interviews with crowds of reporters. Smith was also anxious about reporters from the Hearst papers, which had taken Frank's side. He arranged for Conley to be moved to a different jail, and severed his own relationship with the Georgian.

Conley had a prior criminal record, and his testimony had discrepancies versus the testimony of other witnesses. He admitted to moving the body, claiming Frank had coerced him and that he moved it in the elevator, but Conley also admitted to defecating in the elevator shaft around the time of the murder. The elevator would have crushed the human feces, which were observed by the police in uncrushed state, further discrediting Conley's story and supporting the idea that he had thrown the body in a trapdoor. Additional testimony and affidavits from a girlfriend of Conley's, an employee of the pencil company, the autopsy physician, as well as the analysis of the bite mark on the victim's shoulder, and an affidavit from Frank's office boy that came to light in 1982, further cast doubt on Conley's sworn testimony. The elevator may not have gone to the basement at all that day, which was mentioned by Georgia Gov. Slaton when he commuted Frank's sentence in 1915.

On February 24, 1914, Conley was sentenced to a year in jail for being an accomplice after the fact to Phagan's murder.

=== Media coverage ===
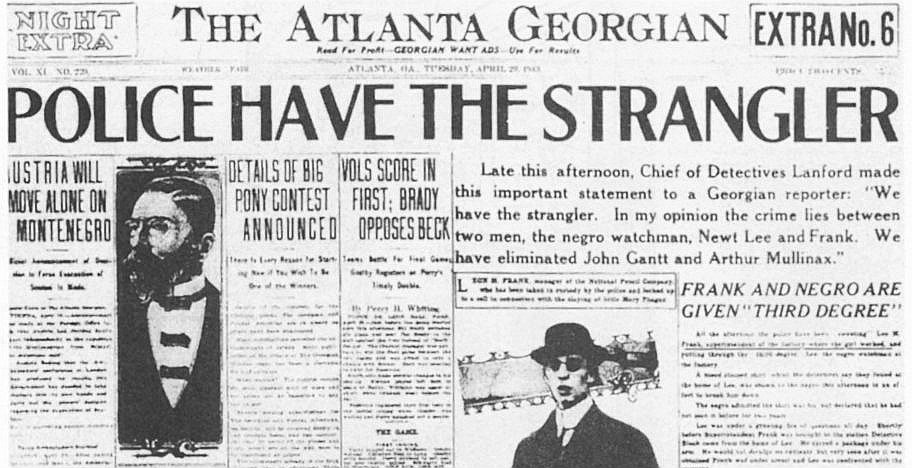
The Atlanta Georgian headline on April 29, 1913, showing that the police suspected Frank and Newt Lee

The Atlanta Constitution broke the story of the murder and was soon in competition with The Atlanta Journal and The Atlanta Georgian. Forty extra editions came out the day Phagan's murder was reported. The Atlanta Georgian published a doctored morgue photo of Phagan, in which her head was shown spliced onto the body of another girl. The papers offered a total of $1,800 in reward money for information leading to the apprehension of the murderer. Soon after the murder, Atlanta's mayor criticized the police for their steady release of information to the public. The governor, noting the reaction of the public to press sensationalism soon after Lee's and Frank's arrests, organized ten militia companies in case they were needed to repulse mob action against the prisoners. Coverage of the case in the local press continued nearly unabated throughout the investigation, trial, and subsequent appeal process.

Newspaper reports throughout the period combined real evidence, unsubstantiated rumors, and journalistic speculation. Dinnerstein wrote, "Characterized by innuendo, misrepresentation, and distortion, the yellow journalism account of Mary Phagan's death aroused an anxious city, and within a few days, a shocked state." Different segments of the population focused on different aspects. Atlanta's working class saw Frank as "a defiler of young girls", while the German-Jewish community saw him as "an exemplary man and loyal husband." Albert Lindemann, author of The Jew Accused, opined that "ordinary people" may have had difficulty evaluating the often unreliable information and in "suspend[ing] judgment over a long period of time" while the case developed. As the press shaped public opinion, much of the public's attention was directed at the police and the prosecution, whom they expected to bring Phagan's killer to justice. The prosecutor, Hugh Dorsey, had recently lost two high-profile murder cases; one state newspaper wrote that "another defeat, and in a case where the feeling was so intense, would have been, in all likelihood, the end of Mr. Dorsey, as solicitor."

== Trial ==
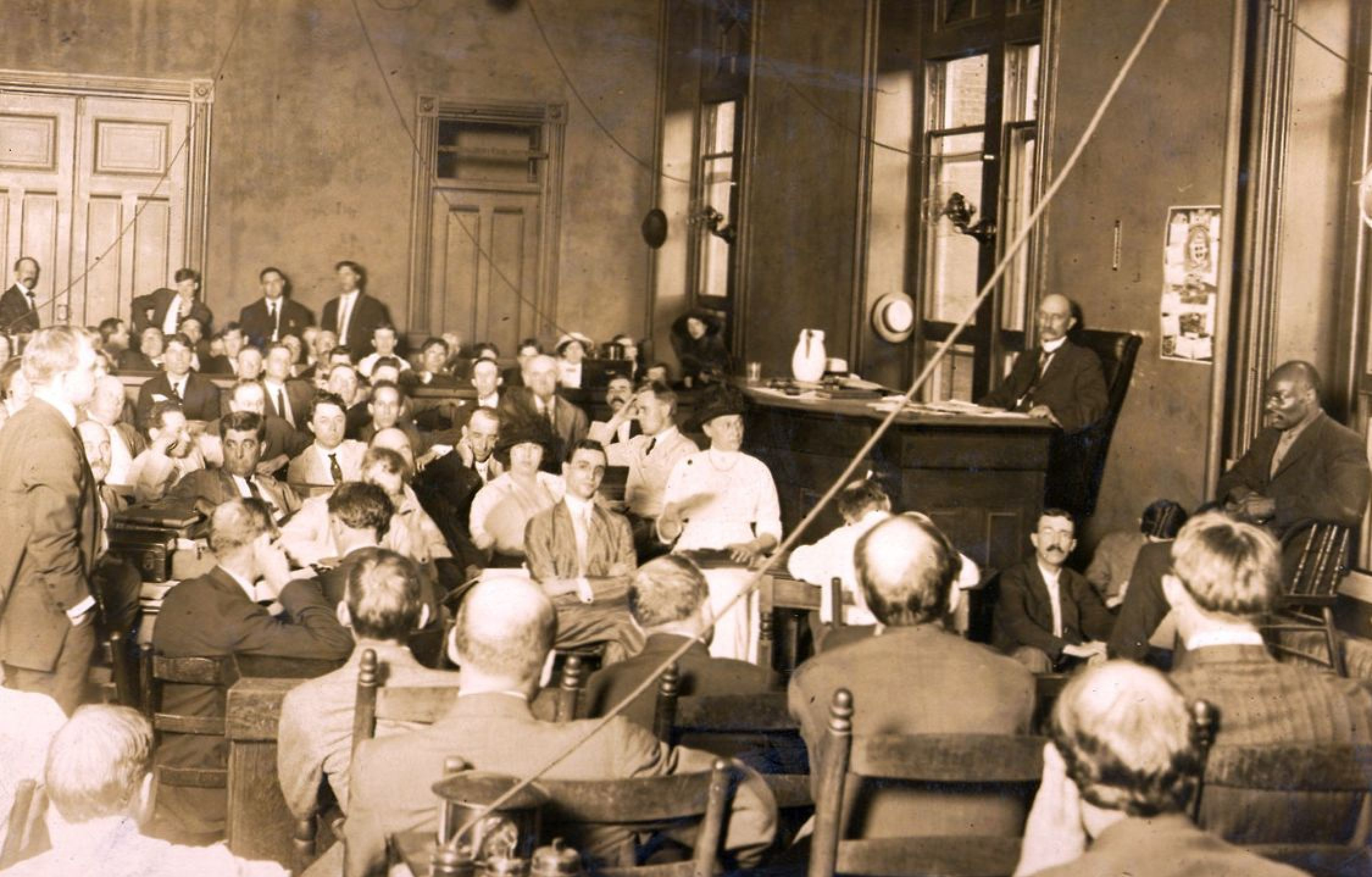
The courtroom on July 28, 1913. Dorsey is examining witness Newt Lee. Frank is in the center.

On May 23, 1913, a grand jury convened to hear evidence for an indictment against Frank for the murder of Phagan. The prosecutor, Hugh Dorsey, presented only enough information to obtain the indictment, assuring the jury that additional information would be provided during the trial. The next day, May 24, the jury voted for an indictment. Meanwhile, Frank's legal team suggested to the media that Jim Conley was the actual killer and put pressure on another grand jury to indict him. The jury foreman, on his own authority, convened the jury on July 21; on Dorsey's advice, they decided not to indict Conley.

On July 28, the trial began at the Fulton County Superior Court (old city hall building). The judge, Leonard S. Roan, had been serving as a judge in Georgia since 1900. The prosecution team was led by Dorsey and included William Smith (Conley's attorney and Dorsey's jury consultant). Frank was represented by a team of eight lawyers – including jury selection specialists – led by Luther Rosser, Reuben Arnold, and Herbert Haas. In addition to the hundreds of spectators inside, a large crowd gathered outside to watch the trial through the windows. The defense, in their legal appeals, would later cite the crowds as factors in intimidation of the witnesses and jury.

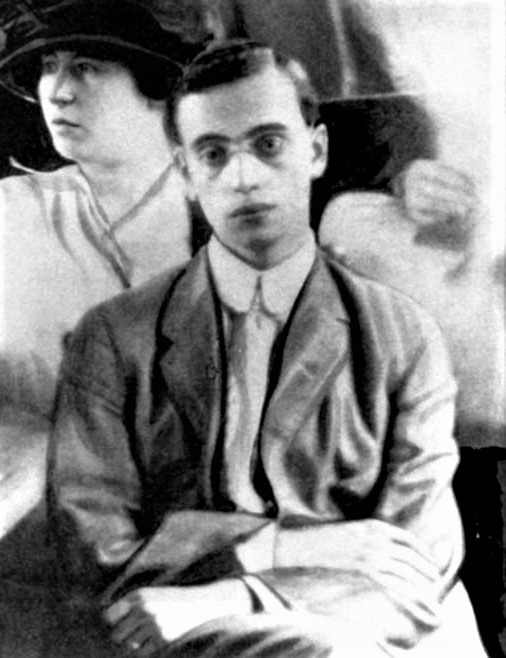
Lucille and Leo Frank during the trial

Both legal teams, in planning their trial strategy, considered the implications of trying a white man based on the testimony of a black man in front of an early 1900s Georgia jury. Jeffrey Melnick, author of Black-Jewish Relations on Trial: Leo Frank and Jim Conley in the New South, writes that the defense tried to picture Conley as "a new kind of African American – anarchic, degraded, and dangerous." Dorsey, however, sought to portray Conley as a "familiar type", insisting that he be understood within the category of the "old negro", drawing on conventions from minstrel shows and plantation-school novels. Dorsey's strategy played on prejudices of the white 1900s Georgia observers, i.e., that a black man could not have been intelligent enough to make up a complicated story. The prosecution argued that Conley's statement explaining the immediate aftermath of the murder was true, that Frank was the murderer, and that Frank had dictated the murder notes to Conley in an effort to pin the crime on Newt Lee, the night watchman.

To support their theory that the murder occurred on the factory's second floor in the machine room near Frank's office, the prosecution presented witnesses who testified to bloodstains and strands of hair found on the lathe. The defense denied that the murder occurred on the second floor. Both sides contested the significance of physical evidence that suggested the place of the murder. Material found around Phagan's neck was shown to be present throughout the factory. The prosecution interpreted the scene in the basement to support Conley's story – that the body was carried there by elevator – while the defense suggested that the drag marks on the floor indicated that Conley carried the body down a ladder and then dragged it across the floor. The defense argued that Conley was the murderer and that Newt Lee helped Conley write the two murder notes. The defense brought many witnesses to support Frank's account of his movements, which indicated he did not have enough time to commit the crime.

The defense, to support their theory that Conley murdered Phagan in a robbery, focused on Phagan's missing purse. Conley claimed in court that he saw Frank place the purse in his office safe, although he denied having seen the purse before the trial. Another witness testified that, on the Monday after the murder, the safe was open and there was no purse in it. The significance of Phagan's torn pay envelope was disputed by both sides.

=== Frank's alleged sexual behavior ===
The prosecution focused on Frank's alleged sexual behavior. (Note: Lindemann indicates there was a developing stereotype of "wanton, young Jewish males who hungered for fair-haired Gentile women." A familiar stereotype in Europe, it reached Atlanta in the 1890s "with the arrival of eastern European Jews." "Fear of Jewish sexuality may have had a special explosiveness in Atlanta at this time because it could easily connect to a central myth, or cultural theme, in the South – that of the pure, virtuous, yet vulnerable White woman.") They alleged that Frank, with Conley's assistance, regularly met with women in his office for sexual relations. On the day of the murder, Conley said he saw Phagan go upstairs, from where he heard a scream coming shortly after. He then said he dozed off; when he woke up, Frank called him upstairs and showed him Phagan's body, admitting that he had hurt her. Conley repeated statements from his affidavits that he and Frank took Phagan's body to the basement via the elevator, before returning in the elevator to the office where Frank dictated the murder notes.

Conley was cross-examined by the defense for 16 hours over three days, but the defense failed to break his story. The defense then moved to have Conley's entire testimony concerning the alleged rendezvous stricken from the record. Judge Roan noted that an early objection might have been upheld, but since the jury could not forget what it had heard, he allowed the evidence to stand. The prosecution, to support Frank's alleged expectation of a visit from Phagan, produced Helen Ferguson, a factory worker who first informed Phagan's parents of her death. Ferguson testified that she had tried to get Phagan's pay on Friday from Frank, but was told that Phagan would have to come in person. Both the person behind the pay window and the woman behind Ferguson in the pay line disputed this version of events, testifying that in accordance with his normal practice, Frank did not disburse pay that day.

The defense called a number of factory girls, who testified that they had never seen Frank flirting with or touching the girls and that they considered him to be of good character. In the prosecution's rebuttal, Dorsey called "a steady parade of former factory workers" to ask them the question, "Do you know Mr. Frank's character for lasciviousness?" The answers were usually "bad".

=== Timeline ===
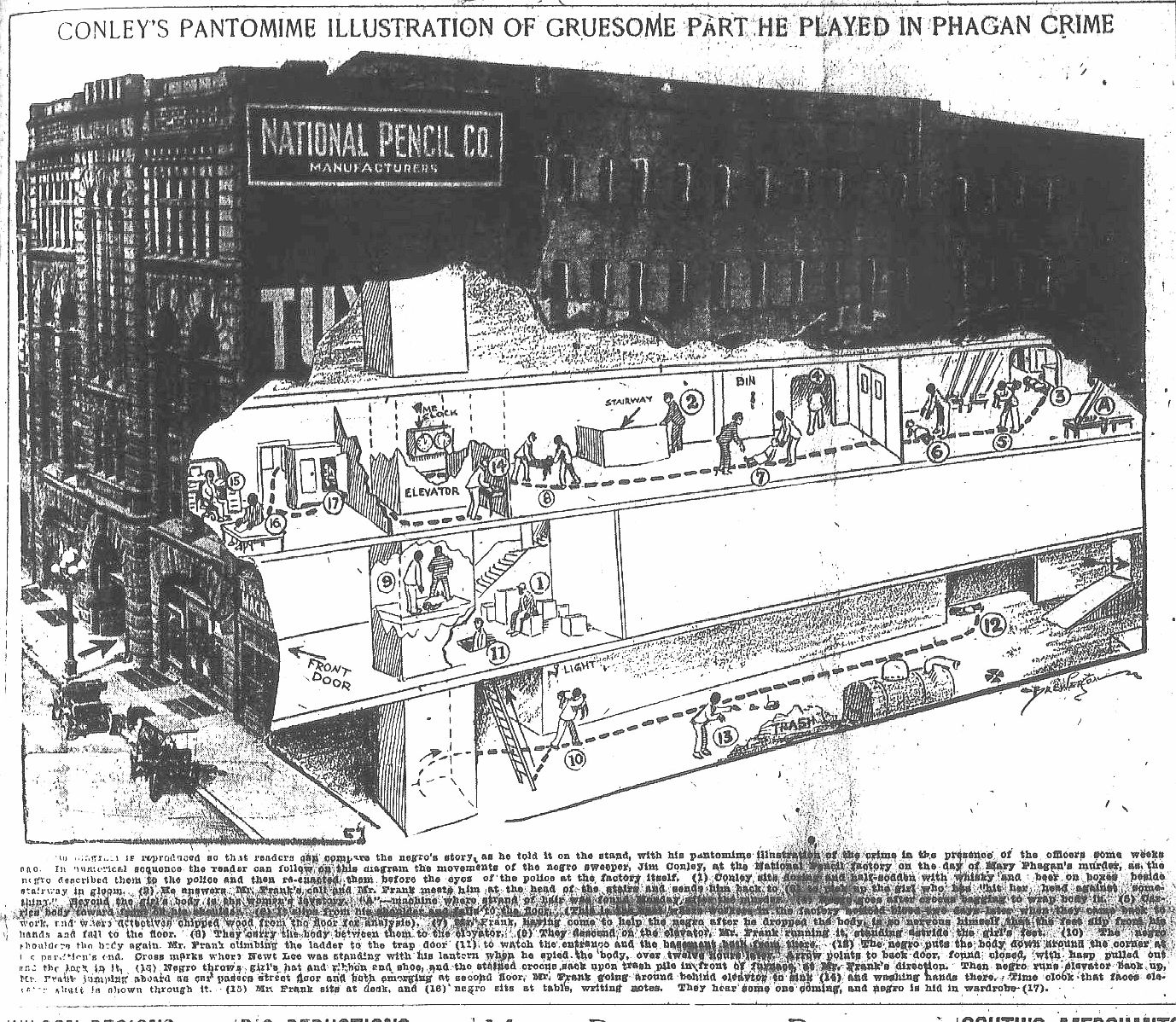
The Atlanta Journal's diagram of Jim Conley's account of the events after Phagan's murder

The prosecution realized early on that issues relating to time would be an essential part of its case. At trial, each side presented witnesses to support their version of the timeline for the hours before and after the murder. The starting point was the time of death; the prosecution, relying on the analysis of stomach contents by their expert witness, argued that Phagan died between 12:00 and 12:15 p.m.

A prosecution witness, Monteen Stover, said she had gone into the office to get her paycheck, waiting there from 12:05 to 12:10, and did not see Frank in his office. The prosecution's theory was that Stover did not see Frank because he was at that time murdering Phagan in the metal room. Stover's account did not match Frank's initial account that he had not left the office between noon and 12:30. Other testimony indicated that Phagan exited the trolley (or tram) between 12:07 and 12:10. From the stop it was a two- to four-minute walk, suggesting that Stover arrived first, making her testimony and its implications irrelevant: Frank could not be killing Phagan because at the time she had not yet arrived. (Note: Both the motorman, W. M. Matthews, and the conductor, W. T. Hollis, testified that Phagan got off the trolley at 12:10. In addition, they both testified that Epps was not on the trolley. Epps said at trial that Phagan got off the trolley at 12:07. From the stop where Phagan exited the trolley, according to Atlanta police officer John N. Starnes, "It takes not over three minutes to walk from Marietta Street, at the corner of Forsyth, across the viaduct, and through Forsyth Street, down to the factory.") (Note: Frank stated in his initial police deposition that Phagan "came in between 12:05 and 12:10, to get her pay envelope".)

Lemmie Quinn, foreman of the metal room, testified that he spoke briefly with Frank in his office at 12:20. Frank had not mentioned Quinn when the police first interviewed him about his whereabouts at noontime on April 26. Frank had said at the coroner's inquest that Quinn arrived less than ten minutes after Phagan had left his office, and during the murder trial said Quinn arrived hardly five minutes after Phagan left. According to Conley and several experts called by the defense, it would have taken at least thirty minutes to murder Phagan, take the body to the basement, return to the office, and write the murder notes. By the defense's calculations, Frank's time was fully accounted for from 11:30 a.m. to 1:30 p.m., except for eighteen minutes between 12:02 and 12:20. Hattie Hall, a stenographer, said at trial that Frank had specifically requested that she come in that Saturday and that Frank had been working in his office from 11:00 to nearly noon. The prosecution labeled Quinn's testimony as "a fraud" and reminded the jury that early in the police investigation Frank had not mentioned Quinn.

Newt Lee, the night watchman, arrived at work shortly before 4:00 and Frank, who was normally calm, came bustling out of his office. Frank told Lee that he had not yet finished his own work and asked Lee to return at 6:00. Newt Lee noticed that Frank was very agitated and asked if he could sleep in the packing room, but Frank was insistent that Lee leave the building and told Lee to go out and have a good time in town before coming back.

When Lee returned at 6:00, James Gantt had also arrived. Lee told police that Gantt, a former employee who had been fired by Frank after $2 was found missing from the cash box, wanted to look for two pairs of shoes he had left at the factory. Frank allowed Gantt in, although Lee said that Frank appeared to be upset by Gantt's appearance. Frank arrived home at 6:25; at 7:00, he called Lee to determine if everything had gone all right with Gantt.

=== Conviction and sentencing ===
During the trial, the prosecution alleged bribery and witness tampering attempts by Frank's legal team. Meanwhile, the defense requested a mistrial because it believed the jurors had been intimidated by the people inside and outside the courtroom, but the motion was denied. (Note: In its motion for a mistrial, the defense presented examples of the crowd's behavior to the court.) Fearing for the safety of Frank and his lawyers in case of an acquittal, Roan and the defense agreed that neither Frank nor his defense attorneys would be present when the verdict was read. (Note: This was challenged as a violation of Frank's due process rights in Frank's appeal to the Georgia Supreme Court in November 1914, and in his U.S. Supreme Court appeal, Frank v. Mangum (1915).) On August 25, 1913, after less than four hours of deliberation, the jury reached a unanimous guilty verdict convicting Frank of murder. (Note: The Atlanta Journal reported the next day that deliberation took less than two hours; at the first ballot one juror was undecided, but within two hours, the second vote was unanimous.)

The Constitution described the scene as Dorsey emerged from the steps of city hall: "three muscular men swung Mr. Dorsey ... on their shoulders and passed him over the heads of the crowd across the street to his office. With hat raised and tears coursing down his cheeks, the victor in Georgia's most noted criminal battle was tumbled over a shrieking throng that wildly proclaimed its admiration."

On August 26, the day after the verdict, Judge Roan brought counsel into private chambers and sentenced Frank to death by hanging, with the date set to October 10. The defense team issued a public protest, alleging that public opinion unconsciously prejudiced the jury against Frank. This argument was carried forward throughout the appeal process.

== Appeals ==
Under Georgia law at the time, appeals of death penalty cases had to be based on errors of law, not a reevaluation of the evidence presented at trial. The appeals process began with a reconsideration by the original trial judge. The defense presented a written appeal alleging 115 procedural problems. These included claims of jury prejudice, intimidation of the jury by the crowds outside the courthouse, the admission of Conley's testimony about Frank's alleged sexual perversions and activities, and the return of a verdict based on an improper weighing of the evidence. Both sides called witnesses involving the charges of prejudice and intimidation; while the defense relied on non-involved witness testimony, the prosecution found support from the testimony of the jurors themselves. On October 31, 1913, Roan denied the motion, adding, "I have thought about this case more than any other I have ever tried. With all the thought I have put on this case, I am not thoroughly convinced that Frank is guilty or innocent. But I do not have to be convinced. The jury was convinced. There is no room to doubt that."

=== State appeals ===
The next step, a hearing before the Georgia Supreme Court, was held on December 15. In addition to presenting the existing written record, each side was granted two hours for oral arguments. In addition to the old arguments, the defense focused on the reservations expressed by Judge Roan at the reconsideration hearing, citing six cases where new trials had been granted after the trial judge expressed misgivings about the jury verdict. The prosecution countered with arguments that the evidence convicting Frank was substantial and that listing Judge Roan's doubts in the defense's bill of exceptions was not the proper vehicle for "carry[ing] the views of the judge." On February 17, 1914, in a 142-page decision, the court denied Frank a new trial by a 4–2 vote. The majority dismissed the allegations of juror bias, saying the power of determining this rested strictly with the trial judge except when an "abuse of discretion" was proved. It also ruled that spectator influence could be the basis of a new trial only if the trial judge so ruled. Conley's testimony on Frank's alleged sexual conduct was found to be admissible because, even though it suggested Frank had committed other crimes for which he was not charged, it made Conley's statements more credible and helped explain Frank's motivation for committing the crime according to the majority. On Roan's stated reservations, the court ruled that they did not trump his legal decision to deny a motion for a new trial. The dissenting justices restricted their opinion to Conley's testimony, which they declared should not have been allowed to stand: "It is perfectly clear to us that evidence of prior bad acts of lasciviousness committed by the defendant ... did not tend to prove a preexisting design, system, plan, or scheme, directed toward making an assault upon the deceased or killing her to prevent its disclosure." They concluded that the evidence prejudiced the jurors against Frank and denied him a fair trial.

The last hearing exhausted Frank's ordinary state appeal rights. On March 7, 1914, Frank's execution was set for April 17 of that year. The defense continued to investigate the case and filed an extraordinary motion (Note: Dinnerstein defines an "extraordinary motion" as a motion based on new information not available at the time of the trial. It was needed to continue through the appeals process because the ordinary procedures had been exhausted.) before the Georgia Supreme Court. This appeal, which would be held before a single justice, Ben Hill, was restricted to raising facts not available at the original trial. The application for appeal resulted in a stay of execution and the hearing opened on April 23, 1914. The defense successfully obtained a number of affidavits from witnesses repudiating their testimony. A state biologist said in a newspaper interview that his microscopic examination of the hair on the lathe shortly after the murder did not match Phagan's. At the same time that the various repudiations were leaked to the newspapers, the state was busy seeking repudiations of the new affidavits. An analysis of the murder notes, which had been addressed in detail only in the closing arguments, suggested Conley composed them in the basement rather than writing what Frank told him to write in his office. Prison letters Conley wrote to Annie Maude Carter were discovered; the defense then argued that these, along with Carter's testimony, implicated Conley as the actual murderer.

The defense also raised a federal constitutional issue on whether Frank's absence from the court when the verdict was announced "constituted deprivation of the due process of law". Different attorneys were brought in to argue this point since Rosser and Arnold had acquiesced in Frank's absence. There was a debate between Rosser and Arnold on whether it should be raised at this time since its significance might be lost with all of the other evidence being presented. Louis Marshall, a constitutional lawyer and president of the American Jewish Committee, urged them to raise the point, and the decision was made that it should be made clear that if the extraordinary motion was rejected they intended to appeal through the federal court system and there would be an impression of injustice in the trial. To almost every issue the defense presented, the state had a response: most of the repudiations were either retracted or disavowed by the witnesses; the question of whether outdated order pads used to write the murder notes had been in the basement before the murder was disputed; the integrity of the defense's investigators was questioned; intimidation and bribery were charged; and the significance of Conley's letters to Annie Carter was disputed. In its rebuttal, the defense tried to bolster the testimony relating to the murder notes and the Carter letters. (These issues were reexamined later when the governor considered commuting Frank's sentence.) During the defense's closing argument, the issue of the repudiations was put to rest by Judge Hill's ruling that the court could consider the revocation of testimony only if the subject were tried and found guilty of perjury. The judge denied Frank a new trial and the full court upheld the decision on November 14, 1914. The full court also said that the due process issue should have been raised earlier, characterizing what it considered a belated effort as "trifling with the court".

=== Federal appeals ===
Frank's team's next step was to appeal the issue through the federal system. The original request for a writ of error on Frank's absence from the jury's announcement of the verdict was first denied by Justice Joseph Rucker Lamar and then Justice Oliver Wendell Holmes Jr. Both denied the request because they agreed with the Georgia court that the issue was raised too late. The full Supreme Court then heard arguments, but denied the motion without issuing a written decision. But Holmes said, "I very seriously doubt if the petitioner ... has had due process of law ... because of the trial taking place in the presence of a hostile demonstration and seemingly dangerous crowd, thought by the presiding Judge to be ready for violence unless a verdict of guilty was rendered." Holmes's statement, as well as public indignation over this latest rejection by the courts, encouraged Frank's team to attempt a habeas corpus motion, arguing that the threat of crowd violence had forced Frank to be absent from the verdict hearing and constituted a violation of due process. Justice Lamar heard the motion and agreed that the full Supreme Court should hear the appeal.

On April 19, 1915, the Supreme Court denied the appeal by a 7–2 vote in the case Frank v. Mangum. Part of the decision repeated the message of the last decision: that Frank failed "to raise the objection in due season when fully cognizant of the fact." Holmes and Charles Evans Hughes dissented, with Holmes writing, "It is our duty to declare lynch law as little valid when practiced by a regularly drawn jury as when administered by one elected by a mob intent on death."

== Commutation of sentence ==
=== Hearing ===
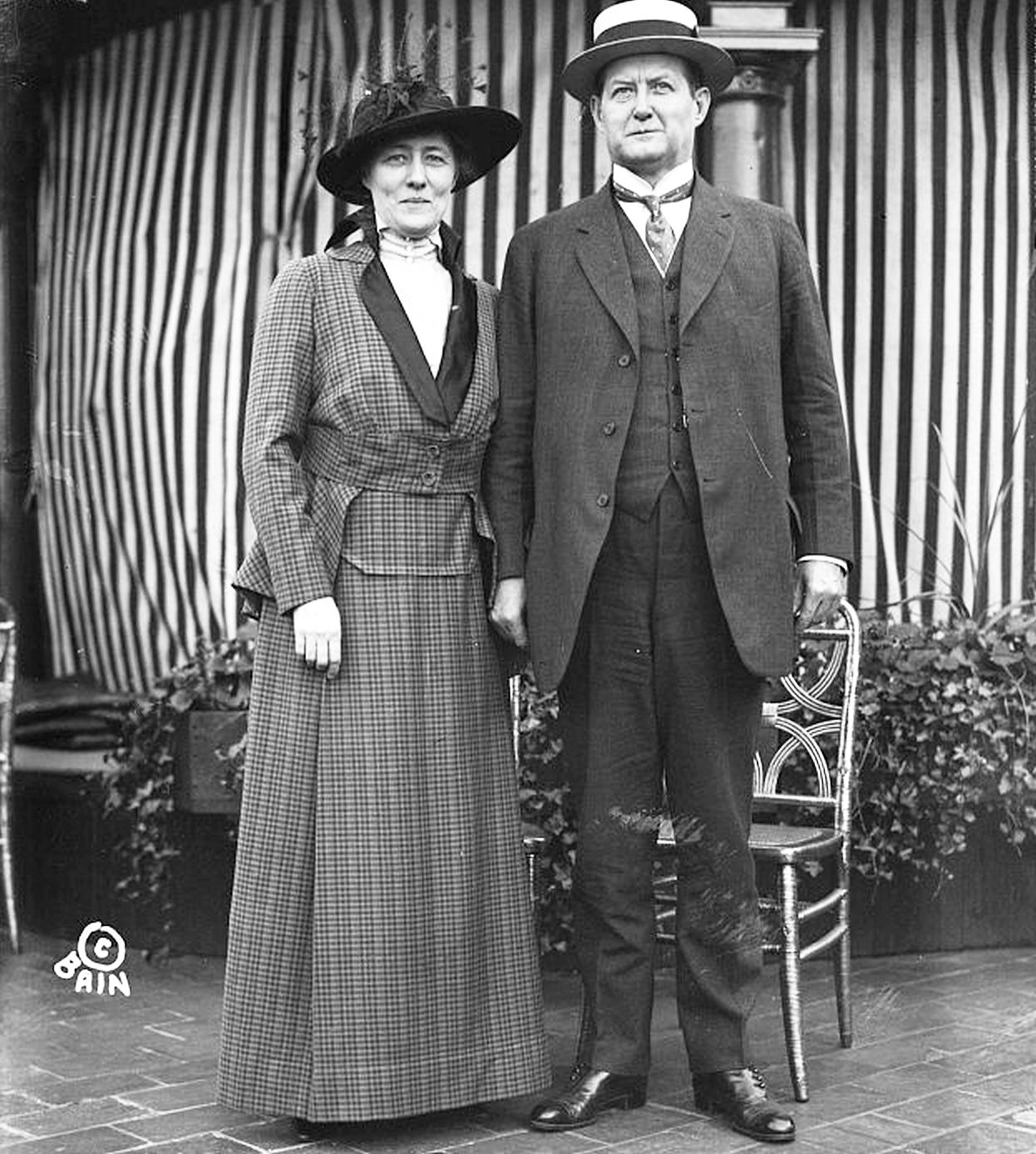
Governor John Slaton and wife

On April 22, 1915, an application for a commutation of Frank's death sentence was submitted to a three-person Prison Commission in Georgia; it was rejected on June 9 by a vote of 2–1. The dissenter indicated that he felt it was wrong to execute a man "on the testimony of an accomplice, when the circumstances of the crime tend to fix the guilt upon the accomplice." The application then passed to Governor John Slaton. Slaton had been elected in 1912 and his term would end four days after Frank's scheduled execution. In 1913, before Phagan's murder, Slaton agreed to merge his law firm with that of Luther Rosser, who became Frank's lead attorney (Slaton was not directly involved in the original trial). After the commutation, popular Georgia politician Tom Watson attacked Slaton, often focusing on his partnership with Rosser as a conflict of interest.

Slaton opened hearings on June 12. In addition to receiving presentations from both sides with new arguments and evidence, Slaton visited the crime scene and reviewed over 10,000 pages of documents. This included various letters, including one written by Judge Roan shortly before he died asking Slaton to correct his mistake. (Note: The Roan letter was addressed to the pardons board but received by Rosser. It said, "I recommend executive clemency in the case of Leo. M. Frank. I wish today to recommend to you and the Governor to commute Frank's sentence to life imprisonment.") (Note: Roan further wrote, "After many months of continued deliberation, I am still uncertain of Frank's guilt. The state of uncertainty is largely due to the character of the negro Conley's testimony, by which the verdict was evidently reached ... The execution of any person whose guilt has not been satisfactorily proved to the constituted authorities is too horrible to contemplate." Roan indicated a willingness to meet with the governor and the parole board, but died before he could do so.) Slaton also received more than 1,000 death threats. During the hearing, former Governor Joseph Brown warned Slaton, "In all frankness, if Your Excellency wishes to invoke lynch law in Georgia and destroy trial by jury, the way to do it is by retrying this case and reversing all the courts." According to Tom Watson's biographer, C. Vann Woodward, "While the hearings of the petition to commute were in progress Watson sent a friend to the governor with the promise that if Slaton allowed Frank to hang, Watson would be his 'friend', which would result in his 'becoming United States senator and the master of Georgia politics for twenty years to come.'"

Slaton produced a 29-page report. In the first part, he criticized outsiders who were unfamiliar with the evidence, especially the press in the North. He defended the trial court's decision, which he felt was sufficient for a guilty verdict. He summarized points of the state's case against Frank that "any reasonable person" would accept and said of Conley, "It is hard to conceive that any man's power of fabrication of minute details could reach that which Conley showed, unless it be the truth." After having made these points, Slaton's narrative changed course and asked the rhetorical question, "Did Conley speak the truth?" Leonard Dinnerstein wrote, "Slaton based his opinions primarily upon the inconsistencies he had discovered in the narrative of Jim Conley." Two factors stood out to Slaton: the transporting of the body to the basement and the murder notes.

==== Transport of the body ====
During the initial investigation, police had noted undisturbed human excrement in the elevator shaft, which Conley said he had left there before the murder. Use of the elevator on the Monday after the murder crushed the excrement, which Slaton concluded was an indication that the elevator could not have been used as described by Conley, casting doubt on his testimony. (Note: "Thus, Conley's elaborate testimony, which included using the elevator with Frank to take the body to the basement, was put into question.") (Note: "Where in the past, Frank's lawyers had caught Conley in little lies, ones he blithely admitted, here, for the first time in an official forum, they had apparently caught him in a big lie, one that cast doubt on his entire testimony.") (Note: "If one accepted the fact that the girl's body did not reach the basement via the elevator, then Conley's whole narrative fell apart, the Governor concluded.")

During the commutation hearing, Slaton asked Dorsey to address this issue. Dorsey said that the elevator did not always go all the way to the bottom and could be stopped anywhere. Frank's attorney rebutted this by quoting Conley, who said that the elevator stops when it hits the bottom. Slaton interviewed others and conducted his own tests on his visit to the factory, concluding that every time the elevator made the trip to the basement it touched the bottom. Slaton said, "If the elevator was not used by Conley and Frank in taking the body to the basement, then the explanation of Conley cannot be accepted." (Note: Quoting from Slaton's statement, "In addition, there was found in the elevator shaft at 3 o'clock Sunday morning, the parasol, which was unhurt, and a ball of cord which had not been mashed.")

==== Murder notes ====
The murder notes had been analyzed before at the extraordinary motion hearing. Handwriting expert Albert S. Osborn reviewed the previous evidence at the commutation hearing and commented, for the first time, that the notes were written in the third person rather than the first person. He said that the first person would have been more logical since they were intended to be the final statements of a dying Phagan. He argued this was the type of error that Conley would have made, rather than Frank, as Conley was a sweeper and not a Cornell-educated manager like Frank.

Conley's former attorney, William Smith, had become convinced that his client had committed the murder. Smith produced a 100-page analysis of the notes for the defense. He analyzed "speech and writing patterns" and "spelling, grammar, repetition of adjectives, [and] favorite verb forms". He concluded, "In this article I show clearly that Conley did not tell the truth about those notes." Slaton compared the murder notes, Conley's letters to Annie Maude Carter, and his trial testimony. Throughout these documents, he found similar use of the words "like", "play", "lay", "love", and "hisself". He also found double adjectives such as "long tall negro", "tall, slim build heavy man", and "good long wide piece of cord in his hands".

Slaton was also convinced that the murder notes were written in the basement, not in Frank's office. Slaton accepted the defense's argument that the notes were written on dated order pads signed by a former employee that were only kept in the basement. Slaton wrote that the employee signed an affidavit stating that, when he left the company in 1912, "he personally packed up all of the duplicate orders ... and sent them down to the basement to be burned. This evidence was never passed upon by the jury and developed since the trial."

=== Timing and physical evidence ===
Slaton's narrative touched on other aspects of the evidence and testimony that suggested reasonable doubt. For example, he accepted the defense's argument that charges by Conley of perversion were based on someone coaching him that Jews were circumcised. He accepted the defense's interpretation of the timeline; citing the evidence produced at trial—including the possibility that Stover did not see Frank because she did not proceed further than the outer office—he wrote: "Therefore, Monteen Stover must have arrived before Mary Phagan, and while Monteen Stover was in the room it hardly seems possible under the evidence, that Mary Phagan was at that time being murdered." Slaton also said that Phagan's head wound must have bled profusely, yet there was no blood found on the lathe, the ground nearby, in the elevator, or the steps leading downstairs. He also said that Phagan's nostrils and mouth were filled with dirt and sawdust that could only have come from the basement.

Slaton also commented on Conley's story (that Conley was watching out for the arrival of a lady for Frank on the day of the murder):

His story necessarily bears the construction that Frank had an engagement with Mary Phagan which no evidence in the case would justify. If Frank had engaged Conley to watch for him, it could only have been for Mary Phagan, since he made no improper suggestion to any other female on that day, and it was undisputed that many did come up prior to 12.00 o'clock, and whom could Frank have been expecting except Mary Phagan under Conley's story. This view cannot be entertained, as an unjustifiable reflection on the young girl.

=== Conclusion ===
On June 21, 1915, Slaton released the order to commute Frank's murder conviction to life imprisonment. Slaton's legal rationale was that there was sufficient new evidence not available at the original trial to justify Frank's actions. He wrote:

In the Frank case three matters have developed since the trial which did not come before the jury, to-wit: The Carter notes, the testimony of Becker, indicating the death notes were written in the basement, and the testimony of Dr. Harris, that he was under the impression that the hair on the lathe was not that of Mary Phagan, and thus tending to show that the crime was not committed on the floor of Frank's office. While defense made the subject an extraordinary motion for a new trial, it is well known that it is almost a practical impossibility to have a verdict set aside by this procedure.

The commutation was headline news. Atlanta Mayor Jimmy Woodward remarked, "The larger part of the population believes Frank guilty and that the commutation was a mistake." In response, Slaton invited the press to his home that afternoon, telling them:

All I ask is that the people of Georgia read my statement and consider calmly the reasons I have given for commuting Leo M. Frank's sentence. Feeling as I do about this case, I would be a murderer if I allowed that man to hang. I would rather be ploughing in a field than to feel for the rest of my life that I had that man's blood on my hands.

He also told reporters that he was certain that Conley was the actual murderer. Slaton privately told friends that he would have issued a full pardon, if not for his belief that Frank would soon be able to prove his own innocence. (Note: "Privately, Slaton confided to friends that he believed Frank innocent and would have granted a full pardon if he were not convinced that in a short while the truth would come out and then 'the very men who were clamoring for Frank's life would be demanding a pardon for him.' The Governor knew certain 'facts' about the case, which he did not reveal at the time, corroborating the defense's theory of the way Conley had murdered Mary Phagan.")

=== Reaction of the public ===
The public was outraged. A mob threatened to attack Slaton at his home. A detachment of the Georgia National Guard, along with county policemen and a group of Slaton's friends who were sworn in as deputies, dispersed the mob. Slaton had been a popular governor, but he and his wife left Georgia immediately thereafter.

For Frank's protection, he was taken to the Milledgeville State Penitentiary in the middle of the night before the commutation was announced. The penitentiary was "strongly garrisoned and newly bristling with arms" and separated from Marietta by 150 miles (240 km) of mostly unpaved road. But on July 17, The New York Times reported that fellow inmate William Creen tried to kill Frank by slashing his throat with a 7-inch (18 cm) butcher knife, severing his jugular vein. Creen told authorities he "wanted to keep the other inmates safe from mob violence, Frank's presence was a disgrace to the prison, and he was sure he would be pardoned if he killed Frank."

== Antisemitism and media coverage ==
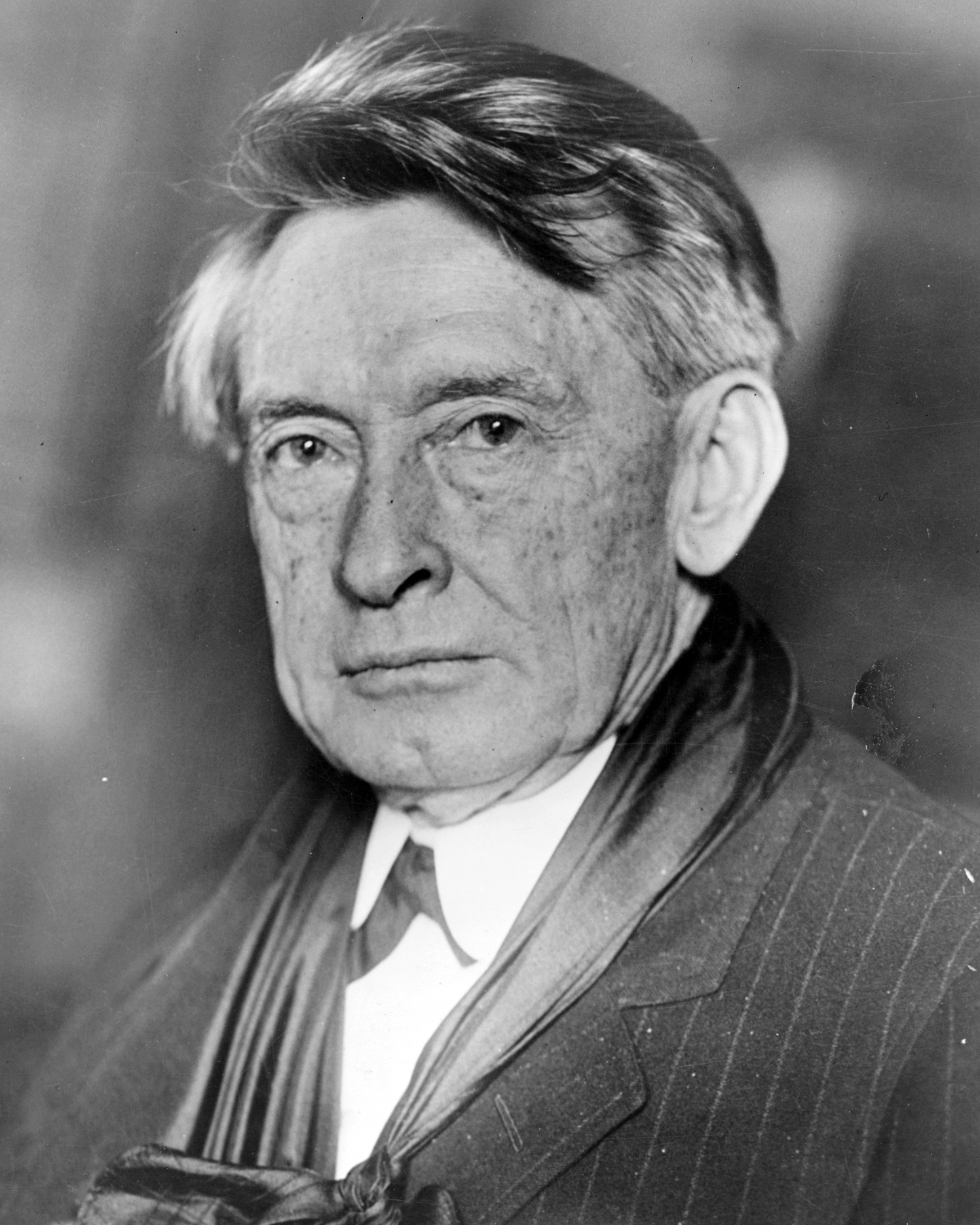
Tom Watson, publisher of Watson's Magazine and The Jeffersonian, incited public opinion against Frank.

The sensationalism in the press started before the trial and continued throughout the trial, the appeals process, the commutation decision, and beyond. (Note: The Georgian offered a $500 reward for information on the case, and produced several extras during the trial. Speaking on the impact of the reward money, Oney wrote, "In effect, the bounty served to deputize the entire city, and by late Monday, the officers working the case would be spending more time following dubious tips than developing legitimate leads.") At the time, local papers were the dominant source of information, but they were not entirely anti-Frank. The Constitution alone assumed Frank's guilt, while both the Georgian and the Journal would later comment about the public hysteria in Atlanta during the trial, each suggesting the need to reexamine the evidence against the defendant. On March 14, 1914, while the extraordinary motion hearing was pending, the Journal called for a new trial, saying that to execute Frank based on the atmosphere both within and outside the courtroom would "amount to judicial murder." Other newspapers in the state followed suit and many ministers spoke from the pulpit supporting a new trial. L. O. Bricker, the pastor of the church attended by Phagan's family, said that based on "the awful tension of public feeling, it was next to impossible for a jury of our fellow human beings to have granted him a fair, fearless and impartial trial." (Note: Bricker wrote in 1943, "My feelings, upon the arrest of the old negro nightwatchman, were to the effect that this one old negro would be poor atonement for the life of this innocent girl. But, when on the next day, the police arrested a Jew, and a Yankee Jew at that, all of the inborn prejudice against Jews rose up in a feeling of satisfaction, that here would be a victim worthy to pay for the crime.")

On October 12, 1913, the New York Sun became the first major Northern paper to give a detailed account of the Frank trial. In discussing the charges of antisemitism in the trial, it described Atlanta as more liberal on the subject than any other Southern cities. It went on to say that antisemitism did arise during the trial as Atlantans reacted to statements attributed to Frank's Jewish supporters, who dismissed Phagan as "nothing but a factory girl". The paper said, "The anti-Semitic feeling was the natural result of the belief that the Jews had banded to free Frank, innocent or guilty. The supposed solidarity of the Jews for Frank, even if he was guilty, caused a Gentile solidarity against him." On November 8, 1913, the executive committee of the American Jewish Committee, headed by Louis Marshall, addressed the Frank case. They did so following Judge Roan's reconsideration motion and motivated by the issues raised in the Sun. They chose not to take a public stance as a committee, instead deciding to raise funds individually to influence public opinion in favor of Frank.

Albert Lasker, a wealthy advertising magnate, responded to these calls to help Frank. Lasker contributed personal funds and arranged a public relations effort in support of Frank. In Atlanta, during the time of the extraordinary motion, Lasker coordinated Frank's meetings with the press and coined the slogan "The Truth Is on the March" to characterize the efforts of Frank's defense team. He persuaded prominent figures such as Thomas Edison, Henry Ford, and Jane Addams to make statements supporting Frank. During the commutation hearing, Vice President Thomas R. Marshall weighed in, as did many leading magazine and newspaper editors, including Herbert Croly, editor of the New Republic; C.P.J. Mooney, editor of the Chicago Tribune; Mark Sullivan, editor of Collier's; R. E. Stafford, editor of the Daily Oklahoman; and D. D. Moore, editor of the New Orleans Times-Picayune. Adolph Ochs, publisher of The New York Times, became involved about the same time as Lasker, organizing a prolonged campaign advocating for a new trial for Frank. (Note: Oney writes, "December 1914 found the New York Times in the midst of an all-out drive of the sort it had never undertaken before. Only three days during the month did the paper not publish a major article on the Frank case. Some of its stories, particularly if there was a new development, strove for balance, but by and large, Ochs's sheet was more interested in disseminating propaganda than in practicing journalism.") Lindemann argues that the publicity campaign had a wide national reach:

Outside of Georgia, as the case gained national visibility, widespread sympathy for Frank was expressed. He received at final count close to a hundred thousand letters of sympathy in jail, and prominent figures throughout the country, including governors of other states, U.S. senators, clergymen, university presidents, and labor leaders, spoke up in his defense. Thousands of petitions in his favor, containing over a million signatures, flowed in.

Both Ochs and Lasker attempted to heed Louis Marshall's warnings about antagonizing the "sensitiveness of the southern people and engender the feeling that the north is criticizing the courts and the people of Georgia." Dinnerstein writes that these attempts failed, "because many Georgians interpreted every item favorable to Frank as a hostile act."

Tom Watson, editor of the Jeffersonian, had remained publicly silent during Frank's trial. Among Watson's political enemies was Senator Hoke Smith, former owner of The Atlanta Journal, which was still considered to be Smith's political instrument. When the Journal called for a reevaluation of the evidence against Frank, Watson, in the March 19, 1914, edition of his magazine, attacked Smith for trying "to bring the courts into disrepute, drag down the judges to the level of criminals, and destroy the confidence of the people in the orderly process of the law." Watson also questioned whether Frank expected "extraordinary favors and immunities because of his race" and questioned the wisdom of Jews to "risk the good name ... of the whole race" to save "the decadent offshoot of a great people." Subsequent articles concentrated on the Frank case and became more and more impassioned in their attacks. C. Vann Woodward writes that Watson "pulled all the stops: Southern chivalry, sectional animus, race prejudice, class consciousness, agrarian resentment, state pride." (Note: Among Watson's comments: "Here we have the typical young libertine Jew who is dreaded and detested by the city authorities of the North for the very reason that Jews of this type have an utter contempt for law, and a ravenous appetite for the forbidden fruit – a lustful eagerness enhanced by the racial novelty of the girl of the uncircumcized.")

Watson attacked the governor and the press, exalted mob justice, accused Frank of sodomy, and published racist material accusing both Jews and blacks of sexual depravity and using racist imagery usually deployed against blacks to describe Frank. Two historians, Robert G. Weisbord and Arthur Benjamin Stein, wrote in 1970 that the lynching intended to send the message that "The Next Jew Who Does What Frank Did Is Going to Get Exactly the Same Thing We Give to Negro Rapists" (Goldstein and Posner refer to this as an actual Watson headline). Watson referred to Frank as a "jewpervert" and "filthy perverted Jew of New York" with a "ravenous appetite" for "forbidden fruit." Historians today generally agree Mary Phagan was not sexually assaulted, but robbed, probably by Conley for her $1.25 wage at the pencil factory.

When describing the public reaction to Frank, historians mention the class and ethnic tensions in play while acknowledging the complexity of the case and the difficulty in gauging the importance of his Jewishness, class, and northern background. Historian John Higham writes that "economic resentment, frustrated progressivism, and race consciousness combined to produce a classic case of lynch law. ... Hatred of organized wealth reaching into Georgia from outside became a hatred of Jewish wealth." (Note: Higham places the incidents in Atlanta within the context of a wider national trend. The failure of progressives to solve national and international problems led to nativist displays "of hysteria and violence that had been rare or nonexistent since the 1890s.") Historian Nancy MacLean writes that some historians have argued that this was an American Dreyfus affair, which she said "[could] be explained only in light of the social tensions unleashed by the growth of industry and cities in the turn-of-the-century South. These circumstances made a Jewish employer a more fitting scapegoat for disgruntled whites than the other leading suspect in the case, a black worker." Albert Lindemann said that Frank on trial found himself "in a position of much latent tension and symbolism." Saying that it is impossible to determine the extent to which antisemitism affected his image, he concluded that "[Frank was seen as] a representative of Yankee capitalism in a southern city, with row upon row of southern women, often the daughters and wives of ruined farmers, 'at his mercy'—a rich, punctilious, northern Jew lording it over vulnerable and impoverished working women." (Note: Lindemann wrote, "Even many Jews in Atlanta long remained doubtful about the importance of Frank's Jewishness in his arrest and conviction. They could hardly ignore the much-heightened tensions between Jew and non-Jew in the city as a result of the trial, as a result particularly of the widespread belief, after Frank's conviction, that the Jews were trying, through devious means, to arrange that a convicted murderer be freed.")

== Abduction and lynching ==
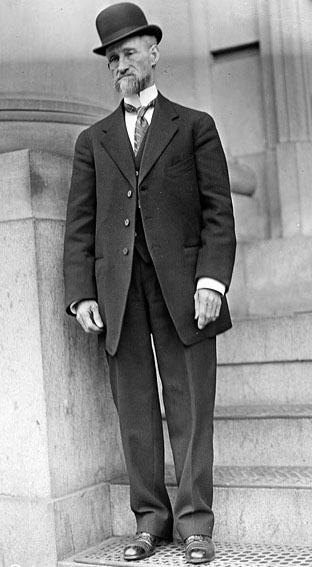
Former Georgia Governor Joseph Mackey Brown, one of the lynchers

The June 21, 1915, commutation provoked Tom Watson into advocating Frank's lynching. He wrote in The Jeffersonian and Watson's Magazine: "This country has nothing to fear from its rural communities. Lynch law is a good sign; it shows that a sense of justice lives among the people." (Note: About two dozen people were lynched each year in Georgia; in 1915 the number was 22; see Oney 2004, p. 122) A group of prominent men organized themselves into the "Vigilance Committee" and openly planned to kidnap Frank from prison. They consisted of 28 men with various skills: an electrician was to cut the prison wires, car mechanics were to keep the cars running, and there was a locksmith, a telephone man, a medic, a hangman, and a lay preacher. The ringleaders were well known locally, but were not named publicly until June 2000, when a local librarian posted a list on the Web based on information compiled by Phagan's great-niece, Mary Phagan Kean (b. 1953). The list included Joseph Mackey Brown, former governor of Georgia; Eugene Herbert Clay, former mayor of Marietta and later president of the Georgia Senate; E. P. Dobbs, mayor of Marietta at the time; Moultrie McKinney Sessions, lawyer and banker; part of the Marietta delegation at Governor Slaton's clemency hearing; (Note: For the list of alleged lynchers, see Donald E. Wilkes Jr. (May 5, 2004). "Steve Oney's List of the Leo Frank Lynchers". Archived from the original on December 1, 2017.) several current and former Cobb County sheriffs.

On the afternoon of August 16, the eight cars of the lynch mob left Marietta separately for Milledgeville. They arrived at the prison at around 10:00 p.m. The electrician cut the telephone wires, and members of the group drained the gas from the prison's cars, handcuffed the warden, seized Frank, and drove away. The 175-mile (282 km) trip took about seven hours through small towns on back roads. Lookouts in the towns telephoned ahead to the next town as soon as they saw the line of cars pass by. A site at Frey's Gin, two miles (3 km) east of Marietta, had been prepared, complete with a rope and table supplied by former Sheriff William Frey. The New York Times reported Frank was handcuffed, his legs tied at the ankles, and that he was hanged from a branch of a tree at around 7:00 a.m., facing the direction of the house where Phagan had lived.

The Atlanta Journal wrote that a crowd of men, women, and children arrived on foot, in cars, and on horses, and that souvenir hunters cut away parts of his shirt sleeves. According to The New York Times, one of the onlookers, Robert E. Lee Howell—related to Clark Howell, editor of The Atlanta Constitution—wanted to have the body cut into pieces and burned, and began to run around, screaming, whipping up the mob. Judge Newt Morris tried to restore order, and asked for a vote on whether the body should be returned to the parents intact; only Howell disagreed. When the body was cut down, Howell started stamping on Frank's face and chest; Morris quickly placed the body in a basket, and he and his driver John Stephens Wood drove it out of Marietta.

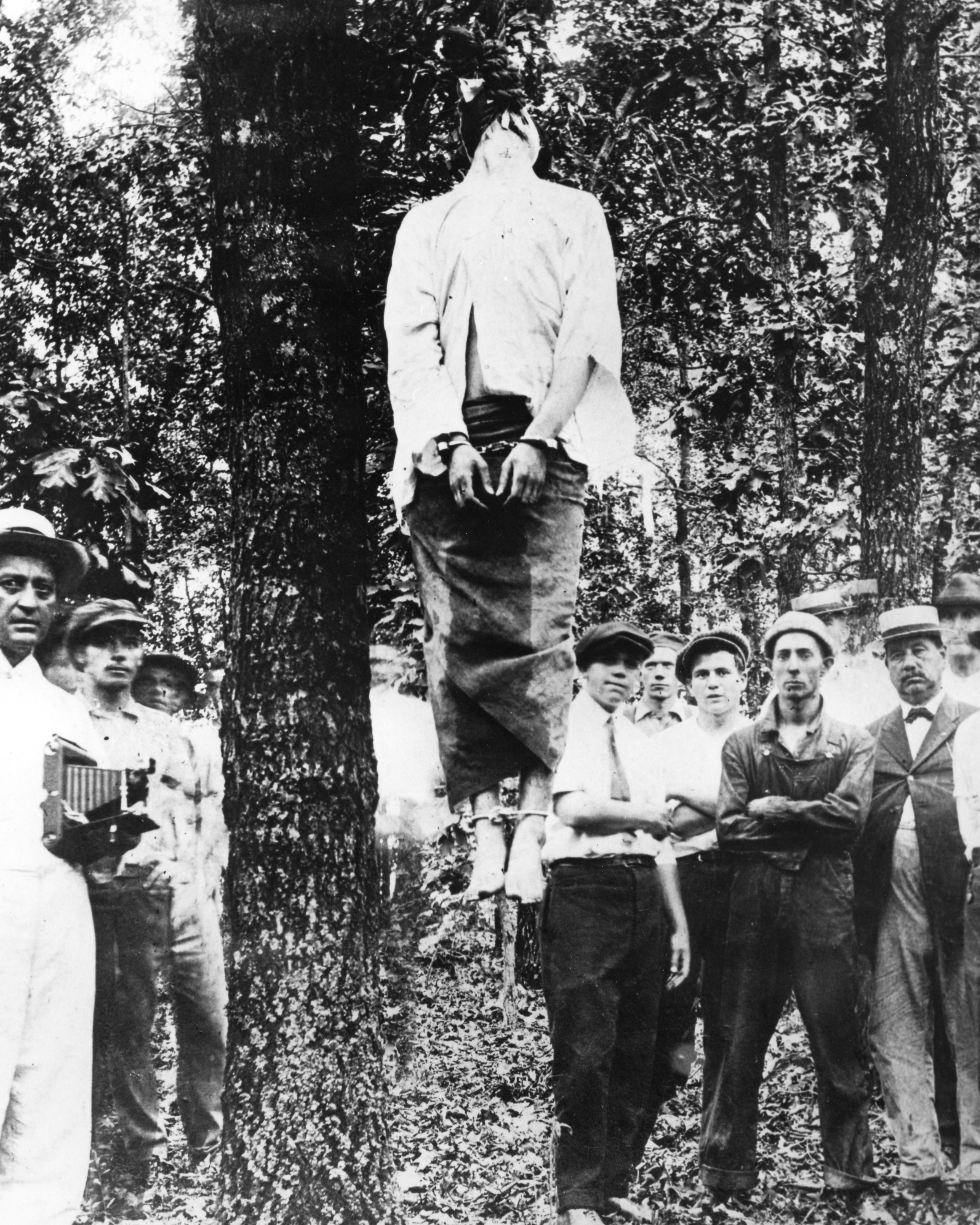
Leo Frank's lynching on the morning of August 17, 1915. Judge Morris, who organized the crowd after the lynching, is on the far right in a straw hat. (Note: The New York Times wrote at the time that, after the lynching, it was Morris who got the crowd under control; see "Grim Tragedy in Woods", The New York Times, August 19, 1915. Years later, he was identified as one of the ringleaders; see Alphin 2014, p. 117)

In Atlanta, thousands besieged the undertaker's parlor, demanding to see the body; after the mob began breaking glass panes, they were allowed to file past the corpse. Around 15,000 people were estimated to have looked at Frank's body. Policemen guarded Frank's casket for fear of further violence. Frank's body was then transported by rail on Southern Railway's train No. 36 from Atlanta to New York and buried in the Mount Carmel Cemetery in Glendale, Queens, New York on August 20, 1915. (When Lucille Frank died, she was not buried with Leo; she was cremated, and eventually buried next to her parents' graves.)

In April 1934, Daniel Bryan Napier, the man who had driven Leo Frank to the tree from which he was hanged, confessed to his role in the lynching. Napier had just been arrested for raping and nearly decapitating 16-year-old Mae Griffin in Louisiana. He initially denied the murder and told the police that his name was Fred Lockhart. After the police saved him from a lynch mob, Napier revealed his true identity, confessed to both Griffin's murder and his role in the lynching of Leo Frank, and said he had escaped from a chain gang in Georgia in 1931 while serving a life sentence for raping a white girl. Noting the irony in how he had nearly been lynched, Napier remarked, "I now know how Frank felt when he was taken from the Georgia prison and hanged." Napier is also suspected of murdering his stepson and it was speculated that he had been the real murderer of Mary Phagan. Napier was convicted of the rape and murder of Mae Griffin and publicly hanged in Shreveport on May 18, 1934.

== After the trial and lynching ==
=== Immediate reactions ===
On August 19, 1915, The New York Times reported that the residents of Cobb County believed the lynch mob "prevented a miscarriage of justice" and had stepped in to uphold the law after Governor Slaton arbitrarily set it aside. A Cobb County grand jury was convened to indict the lynchers; although they were well known locally, none were identified, and some of the lynchers may have served on the very same grand jury that was investigating them. Nat Harris, the newly elected governor who succeeded Slaton, promised to punish the mob, issuing a $1,500 state reward for information. Despite this, Charles Willis Thompson of The New York Times said that the citizens of Marietta "would die rather than reveal their knowledge or even their suspicion [of the identities of the lynchers]", and the local Macon Telegraph said, "Doubtless they can be apprehended – doubtful they will."

Several photographs were taken of the lynching, which were published and sold as postcards in local stores for 25 cents each; also sold were pieces of the rope, Frank's nightshirt, and branches from the tree. According to Elaine Marie Alphin, author of An Unspeakable Crime: The Prosecution and Persecution of Leo Frank, they were selling so fast that the police announced that sellers would require a city license. In the postcards, members of the lynch mob or crowd can be seen posing in front of the body, one of them holding a portable camera. Historian Amy Louise Wood writes that local newspapers did not publish the photographs because it would have been too controversial, given that the lynch mob can be clearly seen and that the lynching was being condemned around the country. The Columbia State newspaper, which opposed the lynching, sarcastically wrote: "The heroic Marietta lynchers are too modest to give their photographs to the newspapers." Wood also writes that a news film of the lynching that included the photographs was released, although it focused on the crowds without showing Frank's body; its showing was prevented by censorship boards around the U.S., though Wood says there is no evidence that it was stopped in Atlanta. (Note: Wood writes that Kenneth Rogers, the head of photography at The Atlanta Constitution and The Atlanta Journal-Constitution between 1924 and 1972, had access to at least one of the photographs, leaving it in the Kenneth Rogers Papers at the Atlanta History Center. She assumes he got it from the newspapers' archives, though the newspapers did not publish it; they accompanied their stories instead with images of the woods near the hanging, and of the crowds who viewed Frank's body later in the funeral parlor; see Wood, pp. 106, 288, footnote 59. See Alphin 2014, p. 122 for details of the souvenir sales.)

Frank's case was mentioned by Adolf Kraus when he announced the creation of the Anti-Defamation League in October 1913. After Frank's lynching, around half of Georgia's 3,000 Jews left the state. According to author Steve Oney, "What it did to Southern Jews can't be discounted ... It drove them into a state of denial about their Judaism. They became even more assimilated, anti-Israel, Episcopalian. The Temple did away with chupahs at weddings – anything that would draw attention." At a rally in New York, Jewish labor leader Joseph Barondess compared Frank's treatment to that of Alfred Dreyfus in France. David Marx also made the same comparison, and convinced the American Jewish Committee president Louis Marshall that antisemitism had played a role in Frank's treatment. The president of Washington's B'nai B'rith, Simon Wolf, distributed a letter advocating for Frank. Jewish newspapers throughout the country took up the cause of crusading against antisemitism. The American Israelite of Cincinnati wrote: "Frank's religion precluded a fair trial ... The man was convicted at the dictates of a mob, the jury and the judge fearing for their lives." However, Marshall was concerned that the rallying around Frank would intensify antisemitism in the South.

Two weeks after the lynching, in the September 2, 1915, issue of The Jeffersonian, Watson wrote, "the voice of the people is the voice of God", capitalizing on his sensational coverage of the controversial trial. In 1914, when Watson began reporting his anti-Frank message, The Jeffersonian's circulation had been 25,000; by September 2, 1915, its circulation was 87,000.

The lynching of Leo Frank, Tom Watson, and the "Knights of Mary Phagan" inspired the revival of the notoriously racially violent and antisemitic Ku Klux Klan. Its 1915 revival came just one month after the lynching, and hot off the heels of the release of The Birth of a Nation, a film glorifying the first KKK.

=== Later consensus: a miscarriage of justice ===
The consensus of researchers on the subject is that Frank was wrongly convicted. (Note: "The modern historical consensus, as exemplified in the Dinnerstein book, is that ... Leo Frank was an innocent man convicted at an unfair trial.") (Note: "The consensus of historians is that the Frank case was a miscarriage of justice.") The Atlanta Constitution stated it was investigating the case again in the 1940s. A reporter who visited Frank's widow (she never remarried), Lucille, said she started crying when he discussed the case with her.

Jeffrey Melnick wrote, "There is near unanimity around the idea that Frank was most certainly innocent of the crime of murdering Mary Phagan." Other historians and journalists have written that the trial was "a gross injustice", "a miscarriage of justice", (Note: Woodward wrote, "Outside the state the conviction was general that Frank was the victim of a gross injustice, if not completely innocent. He presented his own case so eloquently and so ingenuously, and the circumstance of the trial were such a glaring indication of a miscarriage of justice, that thousands of people enlisted in his cause.") and "a mockery of justice"; (Note: Eakin wrote: "Ignoring all other evidence, especially that associated with a black janitor named Jim Conley, and focusing exclusively on Frank, prosecutors brought Leo Frank to trial in what can only be termed a mockery of justice.") that "there can be no doubt, of course, that ... [Frank was] innocent"; (Note: Watson – In reviewing Lindemann's book he wrote, "Turning to his main theme, Lindemann provides a succinct and very scholarly account of the three cases he compares, Dreyfus, Beilis (in which a Jew was tried in Kiev in 1913), and Frank (in which a Jew was convicted of rape and murder in Atlanta, Georgia, in 1915). There can be no doubt, of course, that all three were innocent.") that "Leo Frank ... was unjustly and wrongly convicted of murder"; that he "was falsely convicted"; (Note: "That case, in which a Jewish manufacturer in Atlanta was falsely convicted of murdering a thirteen-year-old girl who worked for him, then lynched in 1915, reeked of anti-Semitism and was devastating to southern Jewry.") and that "the evidence against Frank was shaky, to say the least". C. Vann Woodward, like many other authors, (Note: Dan Carter, in a review of Oney's work, places his work within the context of previous works. "On the central issue he agrees with earlier researchers: Leo Frank did not murder Mary Phagan, and the evidence strongly suggests that Jim Conley did so." Other quotes include: "The best evidence now available indicates that the real murderer of Mary Phagan was Jim Conley, perhaps because she, encountering him after she left Frank's office, refused to give him her pay envelope, and he, in a drunken stupor, killed her to get it."; "It seems certain, however, that the actual killer was James Conley ..."; "Conley was the likely solo killer"; "Many people, then and later, were of the opinion that Conley not only lied at the trial but that he himself was probably the murderer."; "The much more concrete evidence against Conley was thrust aside as the public cried for the blood of the 'Jew pervert'.") believed that Conley was the actual murderer and was "implicated by evidence overwhelmingly more incriminating than any produced against Frank."

Critics cite a number of problems with the conviction. Local newspaper coverage, even before Frank was officially charged, was deemed to be inaccurate and prejudicial. (Note: Early newspaper charges included a charge by a madam, Nina Formby, that Frank wanted her assistance in keeping a young girl on the night of the murder. A private detective claimed to have seen Frank rendezvousing with a young girl in a wooded area in 1912. Early reports of blood and hair samples in the office next to Frank's turned out to be suspect.) Some claimed that the prosecutor Hugh Dorsey was under pressure for a quick conviction because of recent unsolved murders and made a premature decision that Frank was guilty, a decision that his personal ambition would not allow him to reconsider. (Note: It is alleged that Dorsey "suppressed evidence" favorable to Frank, intimidated and bribed witnesses, "drilled Conley in false testimony", "may have lacked the moral strength to back down" as contradictory evidence was uncovered, and feared that if he reversed himself he would have "ruined his career" and be accused of "having sold out to the Jews." Dinnerstein writes on p. 19, "He had recently prosecuted two important accused murderers and had failed each time to convict them." A local newspaper said another failure would be "the end of Mr. Dorsey as solicitor." "Among reporters, the consensus was that the Phagan prosecution represented nothing less than a last chance for him.") Later analysis of evidence, primarily by Governor Slaton and Conley's attorney William Smith, seemed to exculpate Frank while implicating Conley. (Note: Physical evidence suggested the murder occurred in the basement rather than upstairs (as claimed by Conley). Smith's analysis of the murder notes convinced him Conley composed them independently and were planted by Phagan's body as if she wrote them. Oney writes, "Slaton offered a legal rationale for commuting Frank's sentence to life imprisonment, asserting that contrary to the claims of those who opposed the action, there was sufficient new evidence not introduced at the trial ...".)

In modern times, despite strong evidence pointing to Frank's innocence, the case has become a modern focal point for neo-Nazis and antisemites. This is partly because it led to the creation of the Anti-Defamation League but also because it fed into antisemitic conspiracy theories claiming Jewish control of the media. As a consequence, in recent years a number of websites have been established by white supremacists disputing the prevailing consensus of Frank's innocence. On the centenary of the trial, the Anti-Defamation League issued a press release condemning what it called "misleading websites" from "anti-Semites ... to promote anti-Jewish views".

Modern historians such as Mark Raider have referred to the Leo Frank affair as a modern-day American blood libel.

=== Posthumous pardon ===
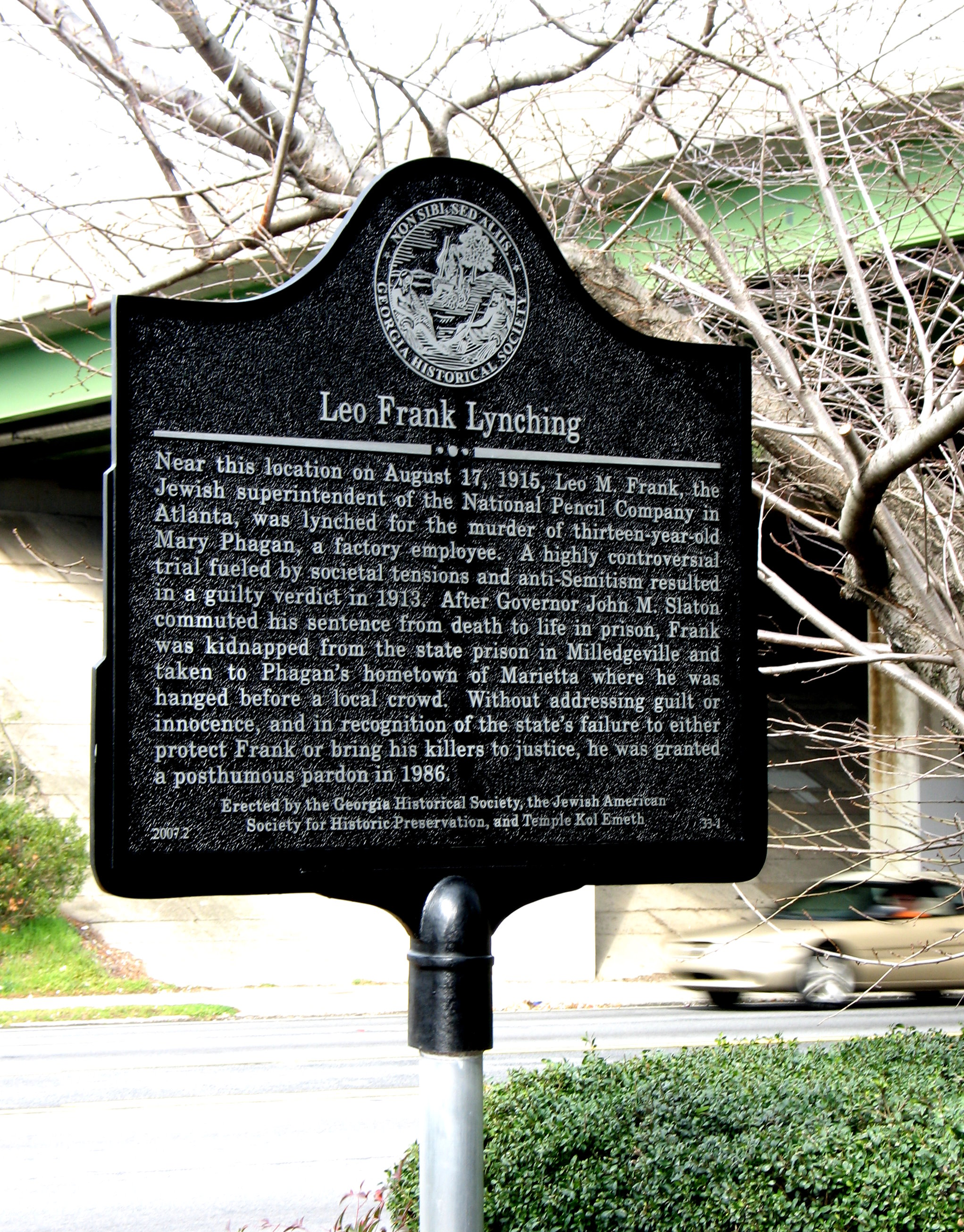
This historical marker, at site of Frank's lynching, mentions his posthumous pardon in 1986.

In 1982, Alonzo Mann, who had been Frank's office boy at the time of Phagan's murder, told The Tennessean that he had seen Jim Conley alone shortly after noon carrying Phagan's body through the lobby toward the ladder descending into the basement. Mann passed a lie detector test and a psychological stress test while testifying that Conley was the murderer. Mann's testimony was not sufficient to settle the issue, but it was the basis of an attempt by Charles Wittenstein, Southern counsel for the Anti-Defamation League, and Dale Schwartz, an Atlanta lawyer, to obtain a posthumous pardon for Frank from the Georgia State Board of Pardons and Paroles. The board also reviewed the files from Slaton's commutation decision. It denied the pardon in 1983, hindered in its investigation by the lack of available records. It concluded, "After exhaustive review and many hours of deliberation, it is impossible to decide conclusively the guilt or innocence of Leo M. Frank. For the board to grant a pardon, the innocence of the subject must be shown conclusively." At the time, the lead editorial in The Atlanta Constitution began, "Leo Frank has been lynched a second time."

Frank supporters submitted a second application for pardon, asking the state only to recognize its culpability for his death. The board granted the pardon in 1986. It said:

Without attempting to address the question of guilt or innocence, and in recognition of the State's failure to protect the person of Leo M. Frank and thereby preserve his opportunity for continued legal appeal of his conviction, and in recognition of the State's failure to bring his killers to justice, and as an effort to heal old wounds, the State Board of Pardons and Paroles, in compliance with its Constitutional and statutory authority, hereby grants to Leo M. Frank a Pardon.

In response to the pardon, an editorial by Fred Grimm in the Miami Herald said, "A salve for one of the South's most hateful, festering memories, was finally applied."

=== Historical marker ===
In 2008, a state historical marker was erected by the Georgia Historical Society, the Jewish American Society for Historic Preservation, and Temple Kol Emeth, near the building at 1200 Roswell Road, Marietta, where Frank was lynched. In 2015, the Georgia Historical Society, the Atlanta History Center, and the Jewish American Society for Historic Preservation dedicated a Georgia Historical Society marker honoring Governor John M. Slaton at the Atlanta History Center.

=== Anti-lynching memorial ===
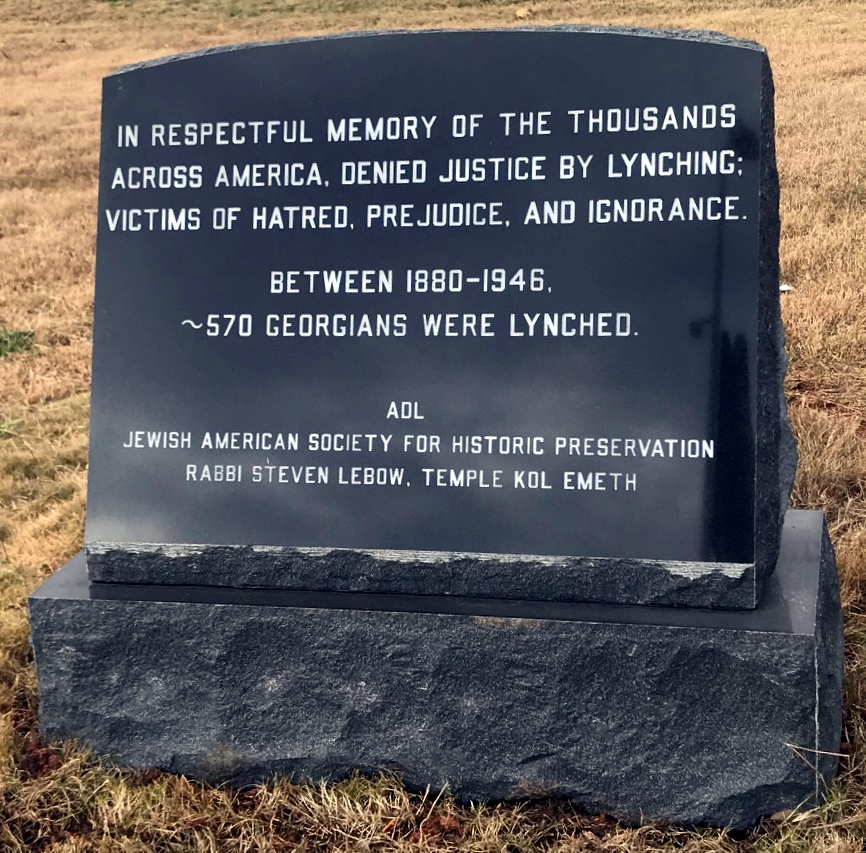
National Anti-Lynching Memorial sited at the Leo Frank Memorial, Marietta, Georgia

In 2018, the Jewish American Society for Historic Preservation, with support from the ADL, and Rabbi Steve Lebow of Temple Kol Emeth, placed the first national anti-lynching memorial at the Georgia Department of Transportation-designated Leo Frank memorial site. The anti-lynching memorial was facilitated by a strong letter of support to the Georgia Department of Transportation by Congressman John Lewis when the Department turned down siting permission. The text of the anti-lynching memorial text reads, "In Respectful Memory of the Thousands Across America, Denied Justice by Lynching; Victims of Hatred, Prejudice and Ignorance. Between 1880-1946, ~570 Georgians Were Lynched."

=== Additional effort to revisit the case ===
In 2019, Fulton County District Attorney Paul Howard founded an eight-member panel called the Conviction Integrity Unit to investigate the cases of Wayne Williams and Frank. The board was formed to re-examine the cases and make recommendations to Howard on whether they should be re-adjudicated.

Lebow and Schwartz have participated in efforts to memorialize the Frank story and try to persuade the state of Georgia to fully exonerate him by declaring him explicitly innocent, beyond the posthumous conditional pardon he received in 1986.

== In popular culture ==
During the trial, Atlanta musician and millworker Fiddlin' John Carson wrote and performed a murder ballad entitled "Little Mary Phagan". During the mill strikes of 1914, Carson sang "Little Mary Phagan" to crowds from the Fulton County courthouse steps. His daughter, Moonshine Kate, later recorded the song. An unrecorded Carson song, "Dear Old Oak in Georgia", sentimentalizes the tree from which Leo Frank was hanged.

The Frank case has been the subject of several media adaptations. In 1921, African-American director Oscar Micheaux directed a silent race film entitled The Gunsaulus Mystery, followed by Murder in Harlem in 1935. In 1937, Mervyn LeRoy directed They Won't Forget, based on the Ward Greene novel Death in The Deep South, which was in turn inspired by the Frank case.

An episode of the 1964 TV series Profiles in Courage dramatized Governor John M. Slaton's decision to commute Frank's sentence. The episode starred Walter Matthau as Governor Slaton and Michael Constantine as Tom Watson. The 1988 TV miniseries The Murder of Mary Phagan was broadcast on NBC, starring Jack Lemmon as Gov. John Slaton, and featured Kevin Spacey.

The plot of David Mamet's 1997 novel The Old Religion follows Frank's false accusation, arrest, trial and conviction, and his lynching.

The 1998 Broadway musical Parade, based on the case, won two Tony Awards. A 2023 Broadway revival of Parade won Tony Awards for Best Revival of a Musical and Best Direction of a Musical.

Frank's story was the subject of a 2009 documentary film, The People v. Leo Frank, directed by Ben Loeterman. It also appeared in the 2025 documentary series "A Jew in America – Torn Identity", which explored stories of American Jews and their search for identity.

In 2024, political commentator Candace Owens revived antisemitic tropes on social media in reference to the Frank case. She accused the ADL of having ties to the Ku Klux Klan.

== See also ==
- Blood libel
- Beilis affair
- Antisemitism in the United States
- Lynching of Samuel Bierfield and Lawrence Bowman
- Abraham Surasky
