= Fiddlin' John Carson =

American singer-songwriter (1868–1949)

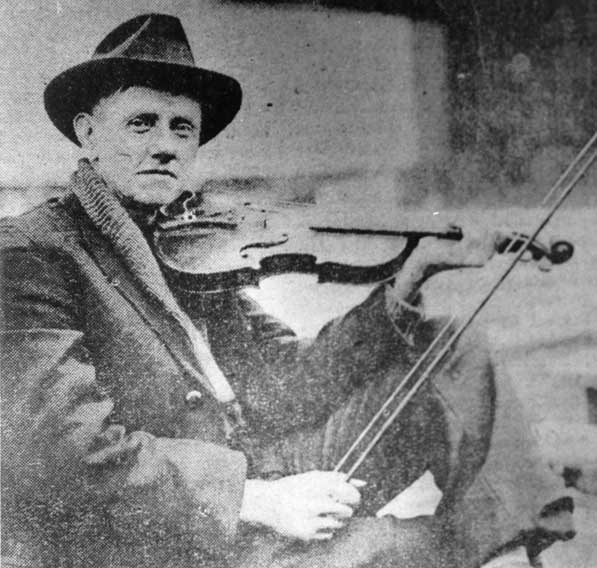

Background information
- Born: John Carson; March 23, 1868; Fannin County, Georgia, United States
- Died: December 11, 1949 (aged 81) Atlanta, Georgia, United States
- Genres: Old-time music, country
- Occupations: Musician, singer
- Instrument: Fiddle
- Years active: 1920s – 1940s

"Fiddlin'" John Carson (March 23, 1868 – December 11, 1949) was an American musician and singer who is widely considered to be one of the early pioneers of country music.

== Early life ==
Carson was born near McCaysville in Fannin County, Georgia. He moved to Cobb County in his youth. His father worked as a section foreman for the Western and Atlantic Railroad Company. In his teens, Carson learned to play the fiddle, using an old Stradivari-copy violin brought from Ireland in the early 18th century. In his teens, he worked as a racehorse jockey.

In 1894, Carson married, and a couple of years later, in 1900, he began working for the Exposition Cotton Mills in Atlanta, followed by work in other cotton mills of the Atlanta area for the next twenty years, eventually being promoted to foreman. In 1911, Carson's family moved to Cabbagetown, Georgia, and he and his children began working for the Fulton Bag and Cotton Mill. Three years later, in 1914, the workers of the cotton mill went on strike for their right to form a union, and Carson had nothing else to do but to perform for a living in the streets of North Atlanta. In these days, he wrote many songs, and he used to print copies and sell them in the streets for a nickel or a dime. Some of the songs he wrote dealt with real-life drama, like the murder ballad "Mary Phagan". Because the governor of Georgia, John Marshall Slaton, commuted the death sentence of the wrongly convicted murderer of Mary Phagan to a life sentence, Carson, in outrage, wrote another version of "Mary Phagan" where he accused the governor of being paid a million dollars from a New York bank to change the verdict, causing him to be thrown in jail for slander. The convicted killer, Leo Frank, was lynched.

On April 1, 1913, Carson performed at the first annual "Georgia Old-Time Fiddlers' Convention" held at the Municipal Auditorium in Atlanta, where he came in fourth. But between 1914 and 1922, he was proclaimed "Champion Fiddler of Georgia" seven times. The governor of Tennessee, Robert L. Taylor, dubbed him "Fiddlin' John". In 1919, Carson began touring, mostly the areas north of Atlanta, with his newly formed band the Cronies. He became associated with many politicians of Georgia, like Tom Watson, Herman Talmadge, and Eugene Talmadge, relations that gave rise to new songs like "Tom Watson Special". Carson and his daughter Rosa Lee began a series of performances for different political campaigns: for the Tom Watson U.S. Senate Campaign in 1920, for all of the Gene Talmadge campaigns, and for the Herman Talmadge for governor campaign. On September 9, 1922, Carson made his radio debut at the Atlanta Journal's radio station WSB in Atlanta, It was reported by the Atlanta Journal that Carson's fame quickly spread all over the United States following his broadcast at WSB.

== Career and aftermath ==
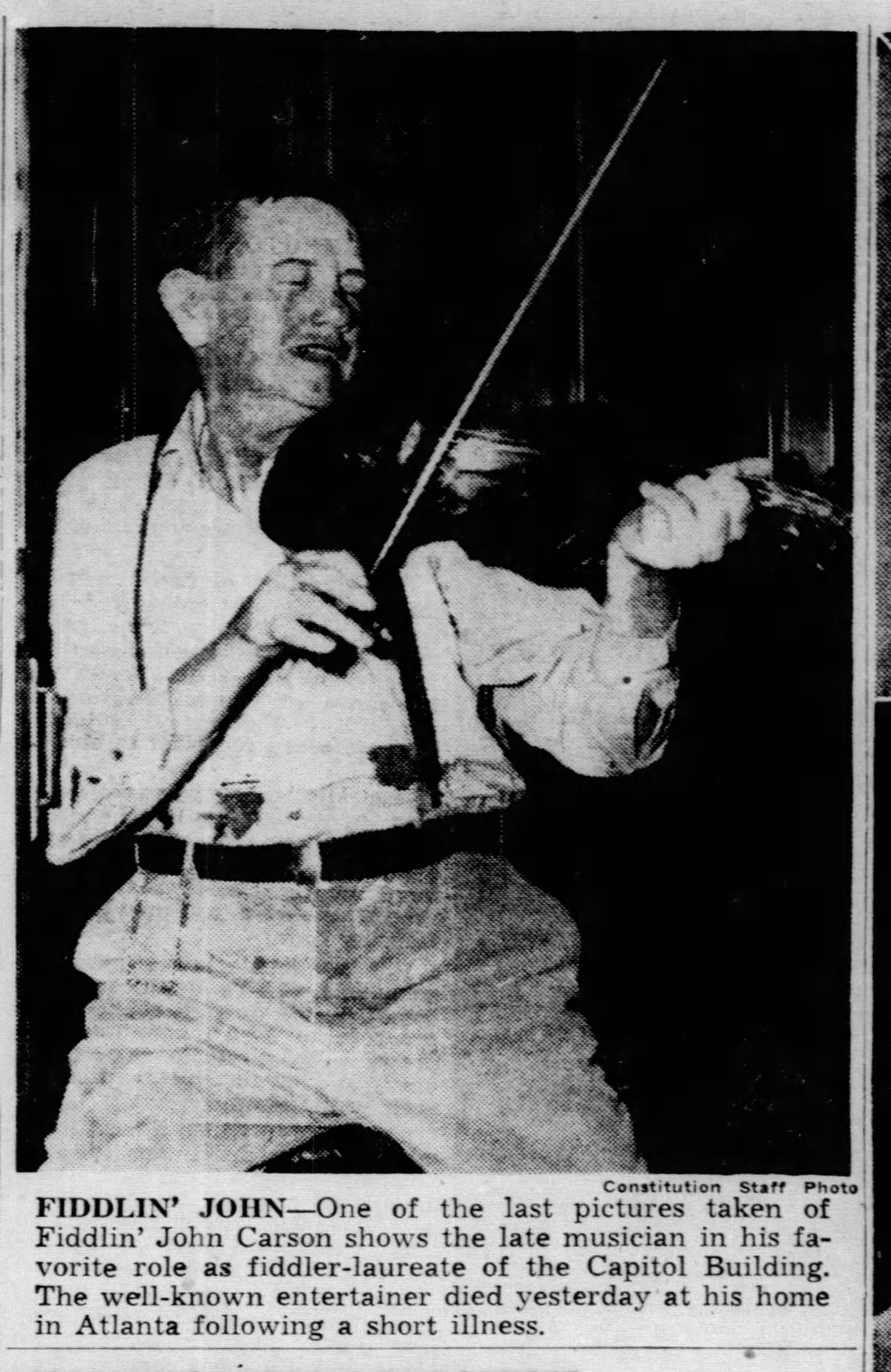
Carson in old age.

In early June 1923, Polk C. Brockman, an Atlanta furniture store owner, who had been instrumental in the distribution of records for Okeh Records, went to New York City to work out a new business deal with Okeh Records. Later, in New York, he was asked if he knew of any artist in Atlanta that could justify a recording trip to Georgia. Brockman promised to return with an answer. A few days later, he was watching a movie followed by a silent newsreel at the Palace Theater in Times Square. The newsreel contained footage of Carson from an old time fiddler's contest in Virginia. Brockman wrote in his notebook: "Record Fiddlin' John Carson". At his next meeting with Okeh Records Board, he persuaded Ralph Peer to go ahead and record Carson.

On June 19, 1923, Carson made his recording debut in an empty building on Nassau Street in Atlanta, cutting two sides, "The Little Old Log Cabin in the Lane" and "The Old Hen Cackled and the Rooster's Going to Crow". Brockman told researchers in the 1960s that Peer had disliked the singing style of Carson and described it "pluperfect awful", but Peer was persuaded by Brockman to press five hundred copies for him to distribute. (Peer's biographer, Barry Mazor, argues that Peer's dissatisfaction concerned the technical quality of the recording, rather than the music, and that Peer was keen to make more recordings of Carson in New York.) The recording was immediately sold out from the stage of the next Fiddler's convention on July 13, 1923. Peer, realizing Carson's potential, immediately invited Carson to New York City for another recording session. His recordings of "You Will Never Miss Your Mother Until She Is Gone" and "Old Joe Clark" both sold over one million copies.

Carson ceased recording temporarily in 1931 but resumed in 1934, now for the Victor label. Between 1923 and 1931, Carson recorded almost 150 songs, mostly together with the "Virginia Reelers" or his daughter Rosa Lee Carson, who performed with him as Moonshine Kate. Carson's final recordings were done in Camden, New Jersey, for Bluebird Records. In 1935, Carson made a trip to Hollywood, as movie producers were eyeing him as their next big movie star. Along with Rosa Lee, he was to appear in a film called The Mountain Stillers, though this never came to pass. He wrote more than 150 songs in his life, but only nine were ever copyrighted. Because Carson could not read sheet music, he had his songs transferred to standard notation by Irene Spain, the stepdaughter of Andrew Jenkins. Carson was involved in several copyright issues with both Okeh Records and other musicians during his active career.

In his later years, he worked for the local government as an elevator operator in Atlanta, a job he had obtained through his friendship with governor Herman Talmadge. He died in 1949 in Atlanta, Georgia, holding his fiddle in his arms, and is buried in Sylvester Cemetery in the neighborhood of East Atlanta, where surviving friends and family play music at his grave each year around the anniversary of his birth.

== Views on race and evolution ==
Carson's song "There Ain't No Bugs on Me" mocked the theory of evolution, stating "there may be monkey in some of you guys, but there ain't no monkey in me". In the same song, he referenced the Ku Klux Klan ("my old man joined the Ku Klux, and ma, she lost her sheet"), whose rallies he regularly attended. Another of Carson's songs was "Ballad of Little Mary Phagan", a murder ballad that stoked the anti-semitism present in Atlanta in the wake of Phagan's murder. Carson later wrote the song "Dear Old Oak in Georgia" about the tree from which Leo Frank was lynched.
