= Moonshine Kate =

American country and folk musician (1909–1992)

Moonshine Kate (born Rosa Lee Carson; born October 10, 1909, Atlanta, Georgia – died 1992, Bainbridge, Georgia) was an American country, old-time, and folk guitarist, banjo player, singer, and comedian. who is best known for recording with her father Fiddlin' John Carson and his band, the Virginia Reelers. Kate was among the earliest recorded women in country music, and arguably her best remembered song was a rendition of her father's composition "Little Mary Phagan".

Carson was born the youngest of nine children born to Jenny Nora Scroggins and John Carson. She began learning guitar and banjo from her father early in her childhood. As early as the age of five, she appeared as a vocalist and dancer at stage shows and political rallies as an accompaniment to her father's musical act. By age 14, Carson proficiently performed with the guitar and banjo as she played alongside her father on Atlanta's flagship radio station, WSB, and toured with him and the Virginia Reelers throughout Georgia. When Carson graduated from high school, she became a permanent member of the band. She became well known for her "Moonshine Kate" persona which highlighted hillbilly comedy as well as songs about rural living.

In June 1925, Carson made her recording debut accompanying her father on guitar on four sides for OKeh Records. In the same session, she also recorded two solo efforts, "The Lonely Child", which was about a lonely wandering orphan, and "Little Mary Phagan". The somber ballad was composed by Fiddlin' John Carson in 1915, as a response to the notorious, and highly publicized murder of 13-year-old Mary Phagan, which was allegedly perpetrated by her manager, Leo Frank. She played and recorded with the Virginia Reelers until 1934, after graduating from high school, adopting the stage name Moonshine Kate in 1928 at the suggestion of Okeh Records man Polk Brockman, to appeal to the increasing popularity of rural-themed humor. Many of Kate's recordings for Okeh play up her name, consisting of short musical passages interspersed with quick-witted dialogues revolving around the moonshine trade. She was one of the earliest women to perform and record old-time and country music in a solo capacity. Her performances were known for combining fiddle-based tunes and comedic storytelling, making her a popular figure in the south.

The Great Depression ended the Carsons' recording days, due to record sales declining, and she continued to perform intermittently throughout the 1930s, also working with Eugene Talmadge on his 1932 bid for Governor of Georgia, providing music for rallies and public events and for the Atlanta Department of Recreation, performing at community events. In 1944, she married J. Wayne Johnson, a sailor and machinist. After retiring, Carson moved to Lake Seminole in southern Georgia. In 1983, both she and her father were inducted into the Atlanta Country Music Hall of Fame. She later reflected on her career in interviews, describing her early experiences with recording sessions and her father’s influence on her musical development. Her recordings and legacy would go on to influence many future female performers in old-time and country music.

== Sources ==
- Moonshine Kate at Allmusic
- Moonshine Kate at the New Georgia Encyclopedia
