= Albert Lindemann =

American historian

Albert S. Lindemann (born 19 May 1938) is an American historian known for his book Esau's Tears: Modern Anti-Semitism and the Rise of the Jews. He also authored The Jew Accused: Three Anti-Semitic Affairs (Dreyfus, Beilis, Frank), 1894–1915. He is a professor emeritus at the University of California, Santa Barbara.

Lindemann was born in Santa Monica, California, and received his B.A. from Pomona College in 1960. He then pursued graduate studies at Harvard, where he earned an M.A. (1962) and Ph.D. (1968). He taught at Stanford during 1965–1966, and then joined the faculty of UC Santa Barbara in 1969.
