= Mark Raider =

American historian

Mark A. Raider is an American historian. He is a professor of modern Jewish history at the University of Cincinnati.

Raider received his B.A. from the University of California, Santa Cruz and his M.A. and Ph.D. from Brandeis University. He has previously served as chair of the Department of Judaic Studies at the University at Albany and was the founding director of its Center for Jewish Studies. He moved to Cincinnati in 2006.

== Books ==
Raider is the author of The Emergence of American Zionism (1998).

His edited volumes include:

- The Essential Hayim Greenberg: Essays and Addresses on Jewish Culture, Socialism, and Zionism (2017)
- Nahum Goldmann: Statesman Without a State (2009)
- American Jewish Women and the Zionist Enterprise, with Shulamit Reinharz (2005)
- The Plough Woman; Records of the Pioneer Women of Palestine — A Critical Edition, with Miriam B. Raider-Roth (2002)
- Abba Hillel Silver and American Zionism, with Jonathan D. Sarna and Ronald W. Zweig (1997)
