= Collecting =

Hobby of locating or acquiring items of interest

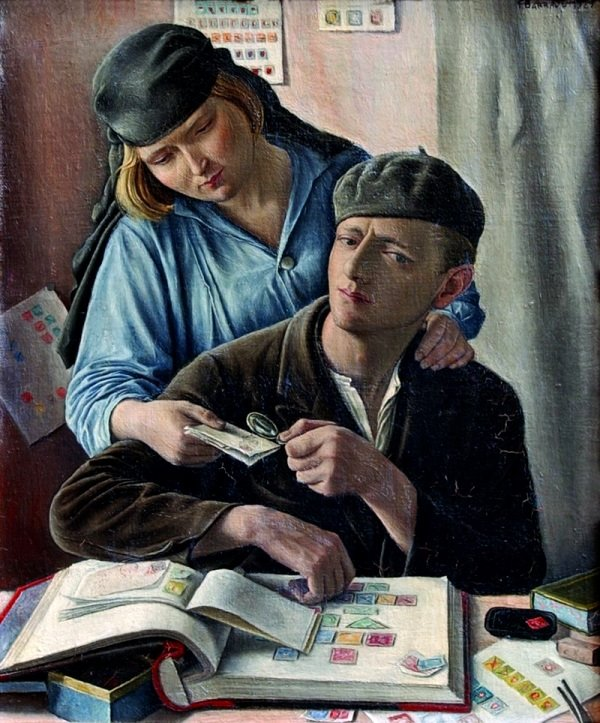
"The Philatelist" (1929) by François Barraud

The hobby of collecting includes seeking, locating, acquiring, organizing, cataloging, displaying, storing, and maintaining items that are of interest to an individual collector. Collections differ in a wide variety of respects, most obviously in the nature and scope of the objects contained, but also in purpose, presentation, and so forth. The range of possible subjects for a collection is practically unlimited, and collectors have realised a vast number of these possibilities in practice, although some are much more popular than others.

In collections of manufactured items, the objects may be antique or simply collectable, or could be produced as a special edition. Antiques are collectable items at least 100 years old, while other collectables are arbitrarily recent. The word vintage describes relatively old collectables that are not yet antiques.

Collecting is a childhood hobby for some people, but for others, it is a lifelong pursuit or something started in adulthood. Collectors who begin early in life often modify their goals when they get older. Some novice collectors start by purchasing items that appeal to them and then slowly work at learning how to build a collection, while others prefer to develop some background in the field before starting to buy items. The emergence of the internet as a global forum for different collectors has resulted in many isolated enthusiasts finding each other.

== Types of collection ==
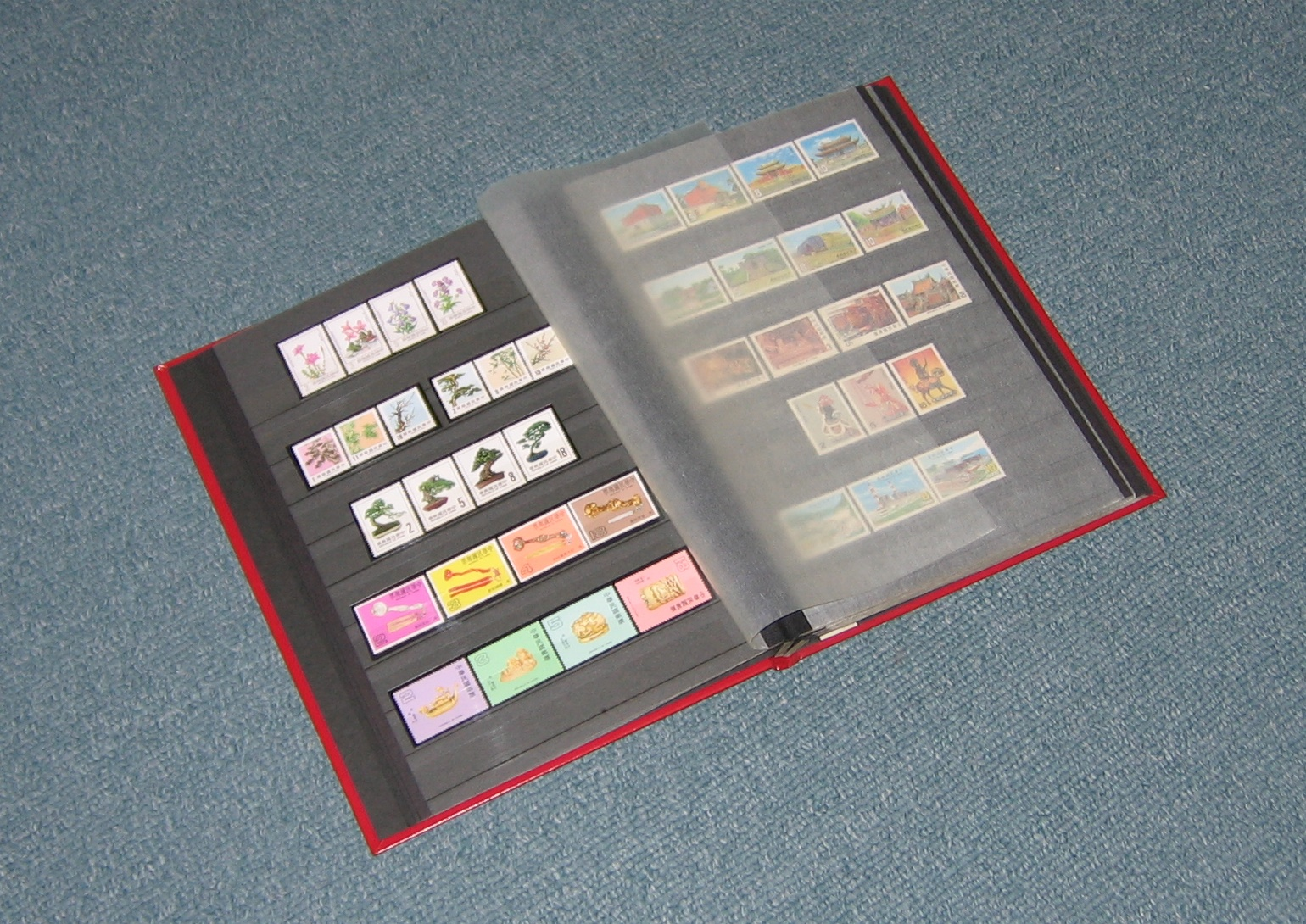
Stamp album used for collecting postage stamps

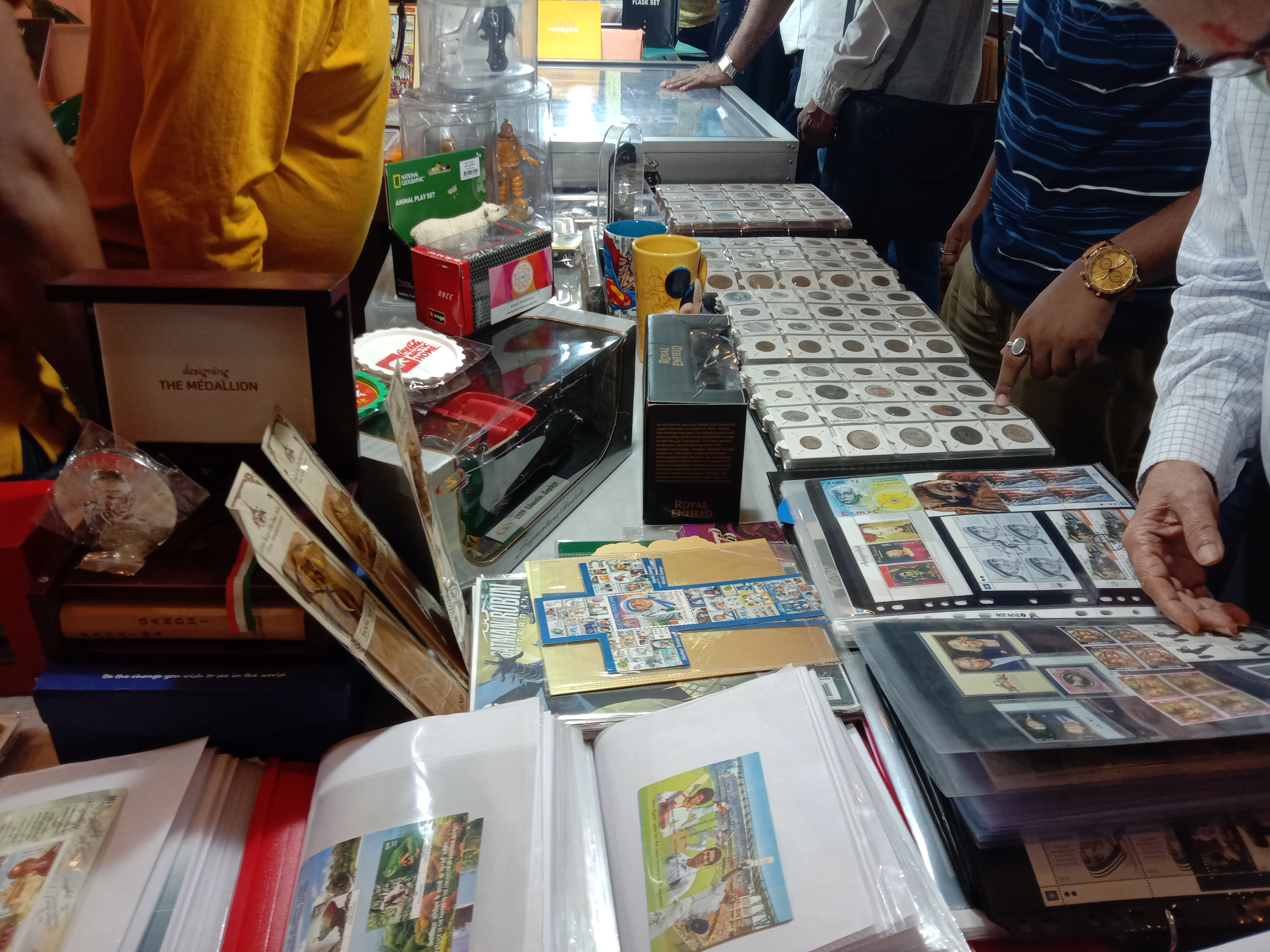
Numismatic and philatelic collectable specimens on display at an exhibition in India

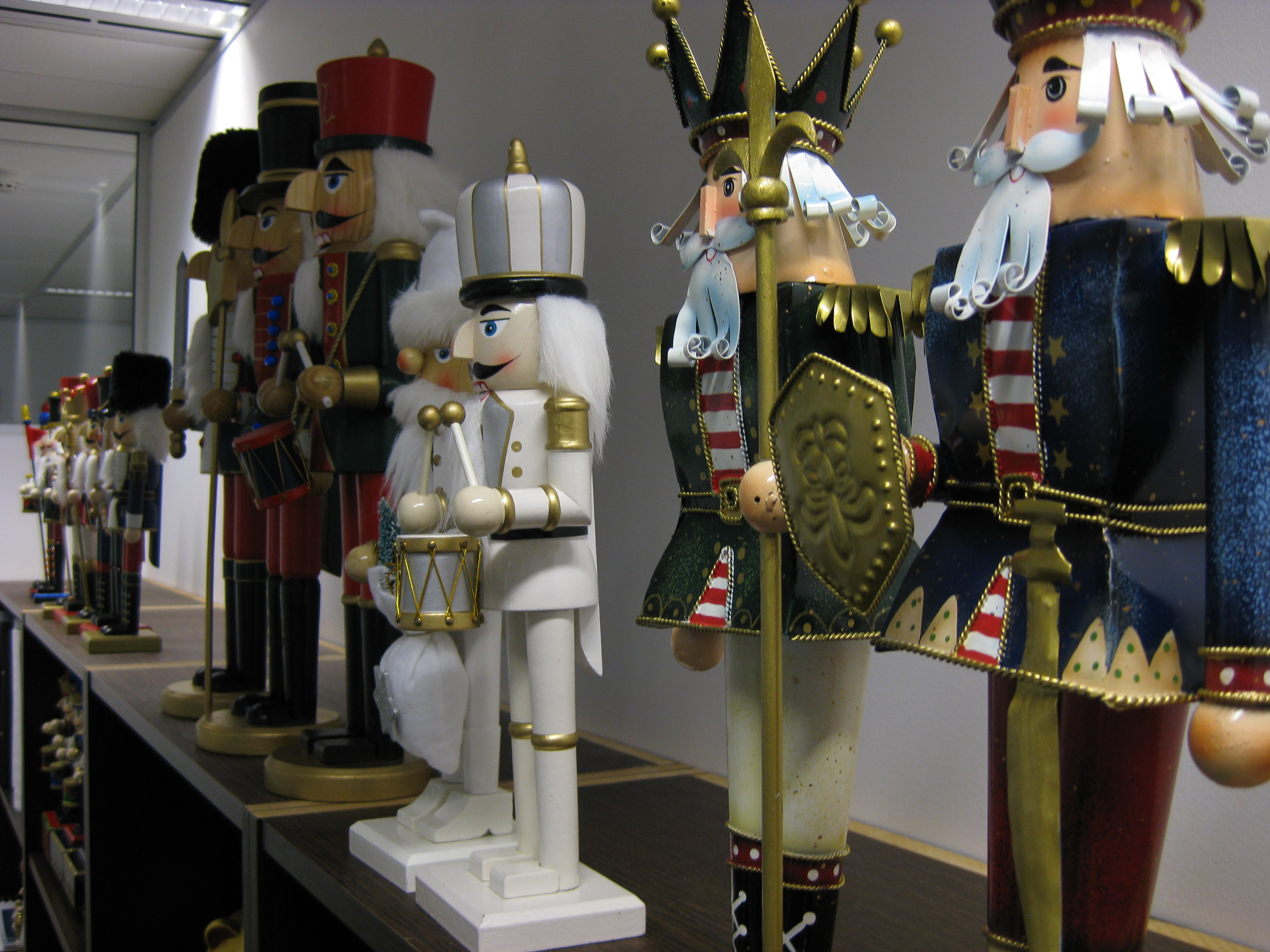
A collection of nutcracker dolls

The most obvious way to categorize collections is by the type of objects collected. Most collections are of manufactured commercial items, but natural objects such as birds' eggs, butterflies, rocks, and seashells can also be the subject of a collection. For some collectors, the criterion for inclusion might not be the type of object but some incidental property such as the identity of its original owner.

Some collectors are generalists with very broad criteria for inclusion, while others focus on a subtopic within their area of interest. Some collectors accumulate arbitrarily many objects that meet the thematic and quality requirements of their collection, others—called completists or completionists—aim to acquire all items in a well-defined set that can in principle be completed, and others seek a limited number of items per category (e.g. one representative item per year of manufacture or place of purchase). Collecting items by country (e.g. one collectible per country) is very common. The monetary value of objects is important to some collectors but irrelevant to others. Some collectors maintain objects in pristine condition, while others use the items they collect.

== Value of collected items ==
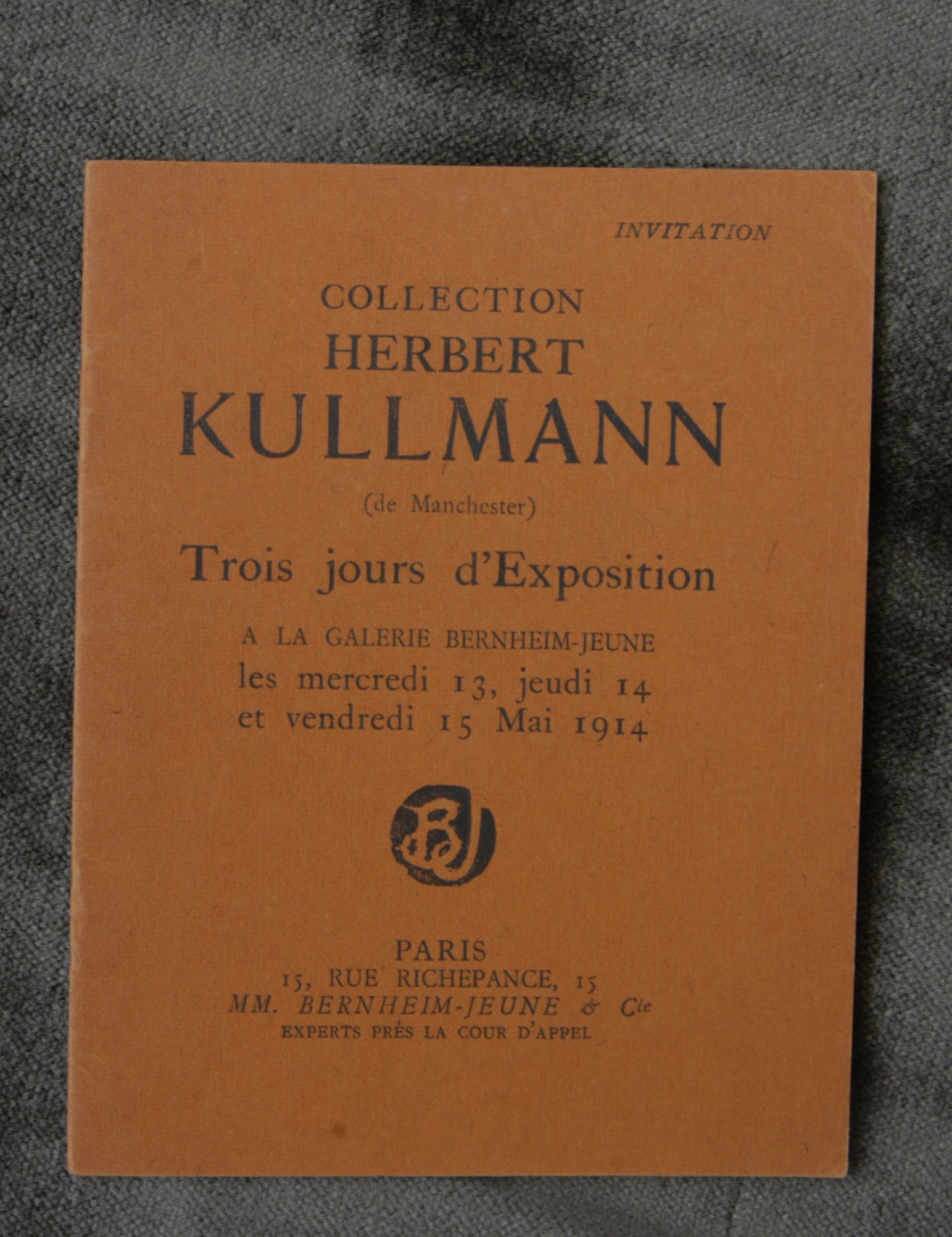
Herbert Kullmann, picture sale catalogue by Bernheim-Jeune, Paris, May 1914.

After a collectable has been purchased, its retail price no longer applies and its value is linked to what is called the secondary market. There is no secondary market for an item unless someone is willing to buy it, and an object's value is whatever the buyer is willing to pay. Depending on age, condition, supply, demand, and other factors, individuals, auctioneers, and secondary retailers may sell a collectable for either more or less than what they originally paid for it. Special or limited edition collectables are created with the goal of increasing demand and value of an item due to its rarity. A price guide is a resource such as a book or website that lists typical selling prices.

Products often become more valuable with age. The term antique generally refers to manufactured items made over 100 years ago, although in some fields, such as antique cars, the time frame is less stringent. For antique furniture, the limit has traditionally been set in the 1830s. Collectors and dealers may use the word vintage to describe older collectables that are too young to be called antiques, including Art Deco and Art Nouveau items, Carnival and Depression glass, etc. Items which were once everyday objects but may now be collectable, as almost all examples produced have been destroyed or discarded, are called ephemera.

== Psychological aspects ==
Psychological factors can play a role in both the motivation for keeping a collection and the impact it has on the collector's life. These factors can be positive or negative.

The hobby of collecting often goes hand-in-hand with an interest in the objects collected and what they represent, for example collecting postcards may reflect an interest in different places and cultures. For this reason, collecting can have educational benefits, and some collectors even become experts in their field.

Maintaining a collection can be a relaxing activity that counteracts the stress of life, while providing a purposeful pursuit which prevents boredom. The hobby can lead to social connections between people with similar interests and the development of new friendships. It has also been shown to be particularly common among academics.

Collecting for most people is a choice, but for some it can be a compulsion, sharing characteristics with obsessive hoarding. When collecting is passed between generations, it might sometimes be that children have inherited symptoms of obsessive–compulsive disorder. Collecting can sometimes reflect a fear of scarcity, or of discarding something and then later regretting it.

Carl Jung speculated that the widespread appeal of collecting is connected to the hunting and gathering that was once necessary for human survival. Collecting is also associated with memory by association and the need for the human brain to catalogue and organise information and give meaning to ones actions.

Besides emotional and cognitive motivations, the reward system of the brain plays an important role in collecting. Anticipation from anticipated object acquisition, especially if there is rarity or uncertainty, can elicit dopamine release, reinforcing the need to continue acquiring. This effect has been greatly elaborated in contemporary collecting cultures related to the blind box or a limited series, in which unpredictability increases excitement and emotional investment. Over time, the collection might be included in the person's identity as such and be a manifestation of taste, status, or community affiliation. In this manner, collecting influences not only behavioral but also self-concept modification, making this line between hobby and psychological attachment quite blurred.

== History ==
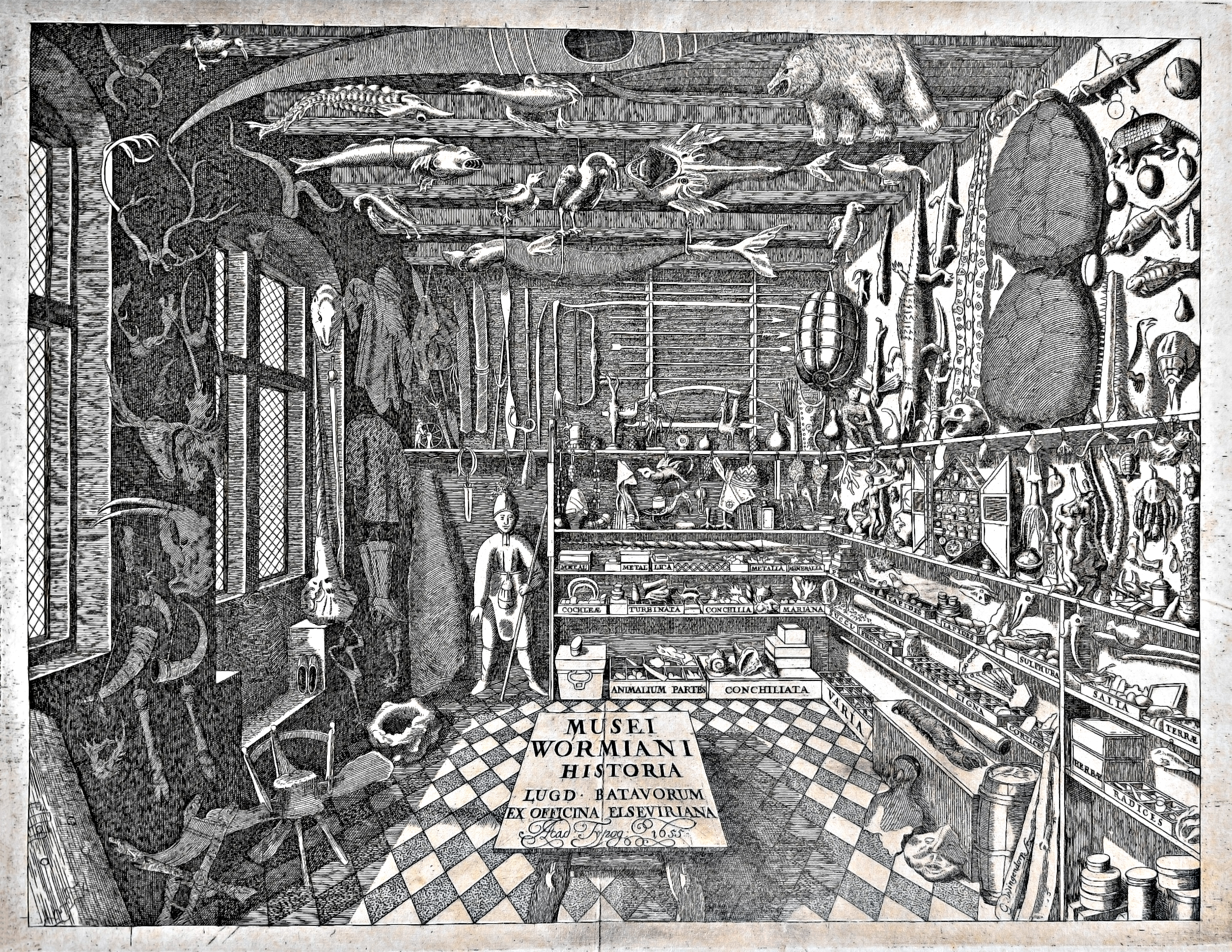
"Musei Wormiani Historia", the frontispiece from the Museum Wormianum depicting Ole Worm's cabinet of curiosities

Collecting is a practice with a very old cultural history. In Mesopotamia, collecting practices have been noted among royalty and elites as far back as the 3rd millennium BCE. The Egyptian Ptolemaic dynasty collected books from all over the known world at the Library of Alexandria. The Medici family, in Renaissance Florence, made the first effort to collect art by private patronage, this way artists could be free for the first time from the money given by the Church and Kings; this citizenship tradition continues today with the work of private art collectors. Many of the world's popular museums—from the Metropolitan in New York City to the Thyssen in Madrid or the Franz Mayer in Mexico City—have collections formed by the collectors that donated them to be seen by the general public.

The collecting hobby is a modern descendant of the "cabinet of curiosities" which was common among scholars with the means and opportunities to acquire unusual items from the 16th century onwards. Planned collecting of ephemeral publications goes back at least to George Thomason in the reign of Charles I and Samuel Pepys in that of Charles II. Collecting engravings and other prints by those whose means did not allow them to buy original works of art also goes back many centuries. The progress in 18th-century Paris of collecting both works of art and of curiosité, dimly echoed in the English curios, and the origins in Paris, Amsterdam and London of the modern art market have been increasingly well documented and studied since the mid-19th century.

The involvement of larger numbers of people in collecting activities came with the prosperity and increased leisure for some in the later 19th century in industrial countries. That was when collecting such items as antique china, furniture and decorative items from oriental countries became established. The first price guide was the Stanley Gibbons catalogue issued in November 1865. Other early research of the history of collecting was done in 1944 in the book Lock, Stock, and Barrel: The story of collecting, written by Elizabeth and Douglas Rigby, was published by J. B. Lippincott & Co.

== Notable collectors ==
- Forrest J. Ackerman — books and movie memorabilia
- James Allen — antiques and photographs
- Raleigh DeGeer Amyx — historical memorabilia
- Alfred Chester Beatty — various collections
- Margaret Bentinck, Duchess of Portland — primarily natural history
- George Weare Braikenridge — primarily art of Bristol
- William Dixson — primarily Australiana
- Philipp von Ferrary — stamps and coins
- David France — football memorabilia
- King George V — stamps
- Barry Halper — baseball memorabilia
- Tom Hanks — typewriters
- George Gustav Heye — Native American artifacts
- Martin Hill — cameras
- Donald Kaufman — antique toys
- Bella Clara Landauer — various, primarily ephemera
- Geddy Lee — bass guitars
- Demi Moore — dolls
- J. P. Morgan — various, primarily gems
- Harvey H. Nininger — meteorites
- Charles Wesley Powell — orchids
- Kenneth W. Rendell — historical documents, primarily World War II
- Christopher Ross — Imperial militaria
- Tim Rowett — children's toys and novelties
- Joaquín Rubio y Muñoz — antique coins
- Hans Sachs — posters
- Hans Sloane — natural history
- Sam Wagstaff — various collections
- Magnus Walker — Porsches
- Henry Wellcome — medical objects

== See also ==
- Antique toy show
- Collectable
- Ephemera
- Hoarding
- Scientific collection
- Category:Collectors

== Bibliography ==
- Blom, Philipp (2005). To Have and To Hold: An Intimate History of Collectors and Collecting. ISBN 1-58567-377-3
- Castruccio, Enrico (2008). "I Collezionisti: usi, costumi, emozioni". Cremona: Persico Edizioni ISBN 88-87207-59-3
- Chaney, Edward, ed. (2003). The Evolution of English Collecting. New Haven: Yale University Press.
- Hume, Ivor Noël (1974). All the Best Rubbish. London: Victor Gollancz.
- Redman, Samuel J. (2016). Bone Rooms: From Scientific Racism to Human Prehistory in Museums. Cambridge: Harvard University Press.
- Rigby, Douglas and Rigby, Elizabeth (1944). Lock, Stock and Barrel: The Story of Collecting. Philadelphia: J B Lippincott. 9781299010123, 1299010121
- Schulz, Charles M. (1984). Charlie Brown's Super Book of Things to Do and Collect: Based on the Charles M. Schulz Characters. New York: Random House, 1984, paperback, ISBN 0-394-83165-9, (hardcover in library binding ISBN 0-394-93165-3)
- Shamash, Jack, (2013). George V's Obsession – a King and His Stamps.
- Shamash, Jack (2014). The Sociology of Collecting.
- Thomason, Alison Karmel (2005). Luxury and Legitimation: Royal Collecting in Ancient Mesopotamia. Hampshire, U.K.: Ashgate Publishing Limited.
- van der Grijp, Paul (2006). Passion and Profit: Towards an Anthropology of Collecting. Berlin: LIT Verlag. ISBN 3-8258-9258-1
