= Don Slater =

British sociologist

Don Slater (born 4 June 1954) is a British sociologist.

A reader in sociology at the London School of Economics, Slater has researched the use of light in public infrastructure, and new media. He became chief editor of the British Journal of Sociology in 2013, succeeding Richard T. Wright. Slater was replaced by Nigel Dodd in 2014.
