= Martin Hill =

Martin Hill may refer to:

== People ==
- Martin Hill (camera collector) (1936–2017), American antique camera collector
- Martin Hill (cricketer) (born 1945), former English cricketer
- Martin Hill (visual effects artist), British visual effects artist

== Places ==
- Martin Hill (New York), a hill in New York, United States
- Martin Hill (Pennsylvania), a mountain ridge in Bedford County, Pennsylvania, United States
- Martin Hill (Antarctica), a hill at the west side of Whitehall Glacier in the Victory Mountains of Victoria Land
