= Lynching postcard =

U.S. picture postcard depicting a lynching

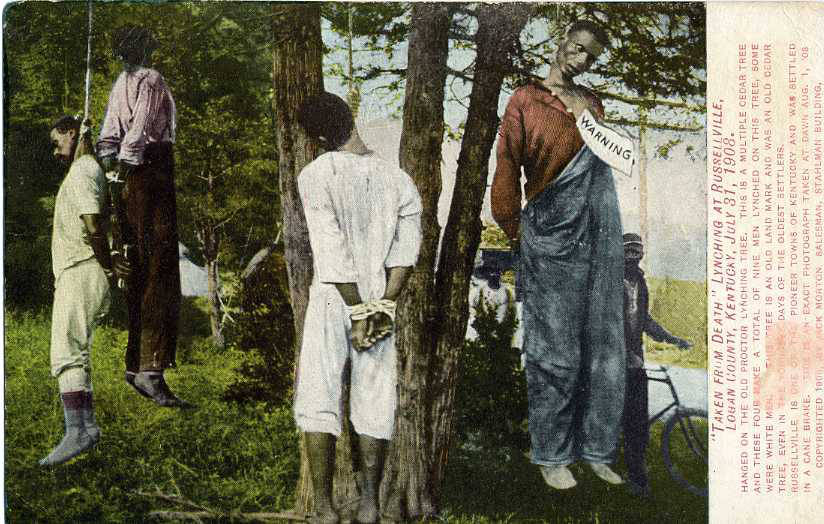
A colorized postcard of the lynching of Virgil Jones, Robert Jones, Thomas Jones, and Joseph Riley on July 31, 1908, in Russellville, Kentucky

A lynching postcard is a postcard bearing the photograph of a lynching—a vigilante killing usually motivated by racial hatred—intended to be distributed, collected, or kept as a souvenir. Often a lynching postcard would be inscribed with racist text or poems. Lynching postcards were in widespread production for more than fifty years in the United States, although their distribution through the United States mail was banned in 1908.

== Description ==
Terror lynchings as a display of racial domination peaked around the 1880s through to the 1940s, and were less frequent until the 1970s, especially (but not exclusively) in the Southern United States. Lynchings were widely used to intimidate recently emancipated African Americans after the Civil War Reconstruction era, and were later used to intimidate voters and civil rights workers of all ethnic backgrounds. Mostly African-American men, women, and children were lynched, for a lack of subservience or for success in business. Others were often accused of crimes and forcibly removed from their homes or jails to be murdered by a white supremacist mob without due process or presumption of innocence.

Spectators sold one another souvenirs including postcards. Often the photographer was one of the killers.

In a typical lynching postcard, the victim is displayed prominently at the center of the shot, while smiling spectators, often including children, crowd the margins of the frame, posing for the camera to prove their presence. Facial expressions suggesting remorse, guilt, shame, or regret are rare.

== Cultural significance ==
Some purchasers used lynching postcards as ordinary postcards, communicating unrelated events to friends and relatives. Others resold lynching postcards at a profit. Still others collected them as historical objects or racist paraphernalia: their manufacture and continued distribution was part of white supremacist culture, and has been likened to "bigot pornography".

Whatever their use, the cultural message embodied in most lynching postcards was one of racial superiority. Historian Amy Louise Wood argues:

Within specific localities, viewers did not disconnect the photographs from the actual lynchings they represented. Through that particularity, the images served as visual proof for the uncontested 'truth' of white civilized morality over and against supposed black bestiality and savagery.

Viewed from an outsider's perspective, bereft of local context, the postcards symbolized white power more generally. White citizens were depicted as victorious over powerless murdered black victims, and the pictures became part of secular iconography.

Richard Lacayo, writing for Time magazine, noted in 2000:

Even the Nazis did not stoop to selling souvenirs of Auschwitz, but lynching scenes became a burgeoning subdepartment of the postcard industry. By 1908, the trade had grown so large, and the practice of sending postcards featuring the victims of mob murderers had become so repugnant, that the U.S. Postmaster General banned the cards from the mails.

As late as 2000, James Allen was able to acquire a collection of lynching postcards from dealers who offered them in whispered tones and clandestine marketplaces.

== Legality ==
Some towns had censored lynching photographs earlier in the 20th century, but the first step toward nationwide censorship came in 1908. The 1873 Comstock Act had forbidden the publication of "obscene matter as well as its circulation in the mails". In 1908, §3893 was added to the Comstock Act, extending the ban to material "tending to incite arson, murder, or assassination". Although this act did not explicitly ban lynching postcards themselves, it banned the racist text that often accompanied them, which made "too explicit what was always implicit in lynchings".

Despite the amendment, the distribution of lynching photographs and postcards continued, now concealed within envelopes or mail wrappers.

== Lynching Postcards: Token of a Great Day ==
The 2021 documentary short Lynching Postcards: Token of a Great Day documents said souvenirs.

== See also ==
- Coon card – Postcards with anti-black racist imagery
- History of postcards in the United States
- Lynching of Allen Brooks
- Lynching of Laura and L. D. Nelson
- Lynching of Leo Frank
- Lynching in the United States § Photographic records and postcards
- Nazi memorabilia
- Murderabilia
- Nadir of American race relations

== Sources ==
- Allen, James; Littlefield, John (2018) [2000]. Without Sanctuary: Lynching Photography in America. Twin Palms Publishers. ISBN 978-0-944092-69-9.
- Apel, Dora (2004). Imagery of Lynching: Black Men, White Women, and the Mob. New Brunswick, N.J.; London: Rutgers University Press. ISBN 978-0-8135-3459-6.
- Kim, Linda (2012). "A Law of Unintended Consequences: United States Postal Censorship of Lynching Photographs". Visual Resources. 28 (2). Taylor & Francis: 171–193. doi:10.1080/01973762.2012.678812. S2CID 159670864.
- Oney, Steve (2004). And the Dead Shall Rise: The Murder of Mary Phagan and the Lynching of Leo Frank. New York, New York: Vintage Books. ISBN 978-0-679-76423-6.
- Rushdy, Ashraf H. A. (2012). The End of American Lynching. New Brunswick and London: Rutgers University Press. ISBN 978-0-8135-5292-7. JSTOR j.ctt1bqzmzg.
- Wolters, Wendy (2004). "Without Sanctuary: Bearing Witness, Bearing Whiteness" (PDF). Journal of Advanced Composition. 24 (2): 399–425. JSTOR 20866631.
- Wood, Amy Louise (2005). "Lynching Photography and the Visual Reproduction of White Supremacy". American Nineteenth Century History. 6 (3: Lynching Reconsidered: New Perspectives in the Study of Mob Violence). Taylor & Francis: 373–399. doi:10.1080/14664650500381090. S2CID 144176806.
- Young, Harvey (2005). "The Black Body as Souvenir in American Lynching". Theatre Journal. 57 (4): 639–657. doi:10.1353/tj.2006.0054. JSTOR 25069734. S2CID 129940032.
