= LaShawnda Crowe Storm =

Indiana artist and quilter

- Education: University of Michigan at Ann Arbor and School of the Art Institute of Chicago
- Occupation: Artist
- Notable work: "Her Name Was Laura Nelson", 2013 and "redLines", 2022

LaShawnda Crowe Storm is an American artist based in Indianapolis, Indiana. She is known for quilting scenes of historic lynching and violence against African Americans. She is most well known for her quilt of the lynching of Laura Nelson.

== Life and education ==
Crowe Storm went to University of Michigan at Ann Arbor where she received her Bachelors of Arts in English / Creative Writing. She also went to the School of the Art Institute of Chicago where she received her master's degree in Fine Arts.

She works at the Community Engagement Director at the School of Liberal Arts Indiana University Indianapolis with Spirit & Place.

== Art ==
LaShawnda Crowe Storm started The Lynch Quilts Project, which is a community of quilters that work together to depict Lynching of African Americans throughout time by sewing quilts. Her art focuses on issues surrounding Black Americans, such as Redlining, while also contributing to community art projects in Indianapolis.

== Selected works and exhibitions ==
- Her Name Was Laura Nelson, 2013
- Play Station, 2015
- Keeper of my Mother's Dreams, 2017
- Work from The Lynch Quilts Project at Butter, 2021
- RECLAIM, 2022
- redLines, 2022
