= Richard T. Wright =

American criminologist

Richard Wright
- Born: October 15, 1951 (age 74); Los Angeles, California, United States
- Education: University of California Irvine; Cambridge University
- Occupation: Criminologist
- Notable work: Armed Robbers in Action.

Academic background
- Doctoral advisor: Donald J. West
- Other advisor: Gilbert Geis

Richard T. Wright (born October 15, 1951, in Los Angeles) is an American criminologist. He is Board of Regent's Professor of Criminal Justice and Criminology at Georgia State University (GSU) in the Andrew Young School of Policy Studies. He served as Chair of the Department of Criminal Justice and Criminology at GSU from 2014 to 2018, and was elected a Fellow of the American Society of Criminology in 2009.

== Education ==
Wright received his Bachelor of Arts in 1974 and Masters of Arts in 1976, both in social ecology (academic field), from the University of California Irvine. He then went on to receive a Doctor of Philosophy degree in criminology from Cambridge University as a member of Clare College in 1980.

== Career ==
Before joining GSU, Wright was Curator's Professor of Criminology and Criminal Justice at The University of Missouri-St. Louis (UMSL) where he served on faculty from 1984 to 2014, and where he twice served as department chair. Previous to working at UMSL, he was a Research Fellow (1980–1982) then Senior Research Fellow (1982–1984) with the Cambridge Institute of Criminology at Cambridge University. He has served as the editor-in-chief of the Oxford Bibliographies in Criminology and the British Journal of Sociology.

Wright has published widely in the area of offender decision-making, with particular focus on urban street criminals, including residential burglars, armed robbers, carjackers, and drug dealers. He is known as a mixed methods researcher, employing face-to-face interviews, surveys, and quantitative techniques to study offending. His qualitative research is a derivative of ethnography, and notable for its use of semi-structured interviews with active offenders, a technique not widely used in the social sciences because of the challenges associated with recruiting and working with noninstitutionalized street criminals. This work has made him the de facto founder of the "St. Louis School" of criminological research, an inductive reasoning approach which focuses on the cognitive, affective, and situational dynamics inherent in the foreground of crime rather than the background explanations (race, sex, poverty, etc.) typically associated with sociological criminology. Wright's more recent work is on the intersection between advances in technology and crime trends, with a specific focus on how the increasing replacement of cash with digital payments (i.e., a cashless society) will impact street crime

Wright is the author or co-author of six books and more than seventy scholarly articles and book chapters. These include his best known works, Armed Robbers in Action and Burglars on the Job (both co-authored with Scott Decker), which won the 1994-95 Outstanding Scholarship in Crime and Delinquency Award from the Society for the Study of Social Problems. These, as well as his co-authored books with Bruce Jacobs (Street Justice: Retaliation in the Criminal Underworld) and Scott Jacques (Code of the Suburb: Inside the World of Young Middle-Class Drug Dealers) are noteworthy for their reliance on interviews with active offenders. Wright is also co-editor of The Sage Handbook of Fieldwork with Dick Hobbs.

== Works ==
- Burglars on Burglary: Prevention and the Offender, with Trevor Bennett, 1984, ISBN 978-0566007569
- Burglars on the Job: Streetlife and Residential Break-Ins, with Scott H. Decker, 1994, ISBN 978-1555532710
- Armed Robbers in Action: Stickups and Street Culture, with Scott H. Decker, 1997, ISBN 978-1555533236
- Street Justice: Retaliation in the Criminal Underworld, with Bruce A. Jacobs, 2006, ISBN 978-0521617987
- Code of the Suburb: Inside the World of Young Middle-Class Drug Dealer, with Scott T. Jacques, 2015, ISBN 978-0226164113
