= Lynching of Laura and L. D. Nelson =

African-American mother and son lynched in Oklahoma, U.S. (1911)

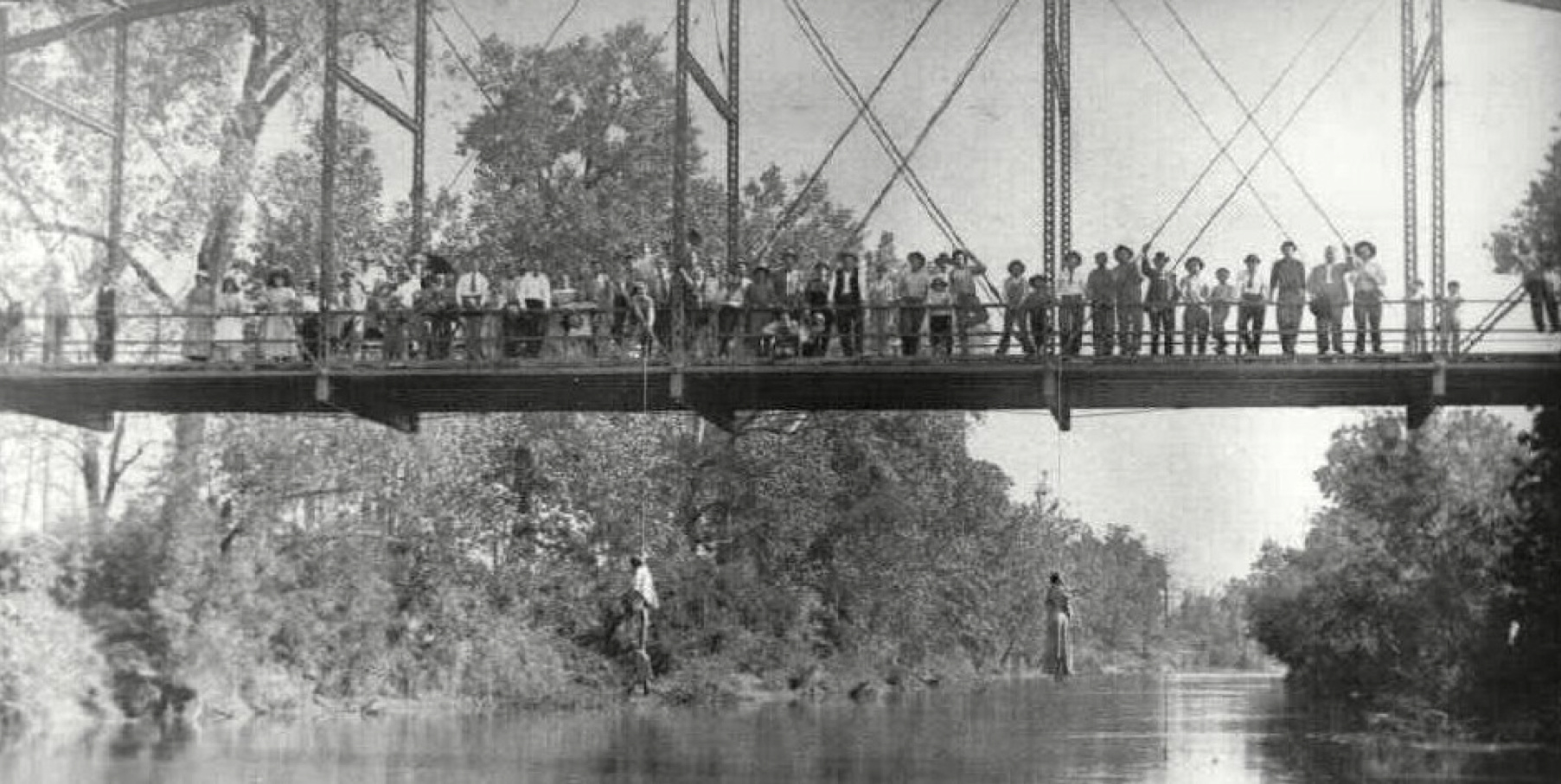
- Photograph no. 2899, one of four extant photographs of the lynching
- Date: May 25, 1911
- Photographer: George Henry Farnum
- Location: Six miles west and one mile south of Okemah, Oklahoma, on a bridge, now demolished, across the North Canadian River. (The replacement bridge became part of Oklahoma State Highway 56.)
- Coordinates: 35°25′46″N 96°24′28″W
- Charges: None

Laura and L. D. Nelson were an African-American mother and son who were lynched on May 25, 1911, near Okemah, Okfuskee County, Oklahoma. They had been seized from their cells in the Okemah county jail the night before by a group of up to 40 white men, reportedly including Charley Guthrie, father of the folk singer Woody Guthrie. The Associated Press reported that Laura was raped. (Note: Associated Press, 1911: "At Okemah, Oklahoma, Laura Nelson, a colored woman accused of murdering a deputy sheriff who had discovered stolen goods at her house, was lynched together with her son, a boy about fifteen. The woman and her son were taken from the jail, dragged about six miles to the Canadian River and hanged from a bridge. The woman was raped by members of the mob before she was hanged.") She and L. D. were then hanged from a bridge over the North Canadian River. According to one source, Laura had a baby with her who survived the attack.

Laura and L. D. were in jail because L. D. had been accused of having shot and killed Deputy Sheriff George H. Loney of the Okfuskee County Sheriff's Office, during a search of the Nelsons' farm for a stolen cow. L. D. and Laura were both charged with murder; Laura was charged because she allegedly grabbed the gun first. Her husband, Austin, pleaded guilty to larceny and was sent to the relative safety of the state prison in McAlester, while his wife and son were held in the county jail until their trial.

Sightseers gathered on the bridge on the morning of the lynching. George Henry Farnum, the owner of Okemah's only photography studio, took photographs, which were distributed as postcards, a common practice at the time. Although the district judge convened a grand jury, the killers were never identified. Four of Farnum's photographs are known to have survived—two spectator scenes and one close-up view each of L. D. and Laura. Three of the images were published in 2000 and exhibited at the Roth Horowitz Gallery in New York by James Allen, an antique collector. The images of Laura Nelson are the only known surviving photographs of a black female lynching victim.

== Background ==
=== In Oklahoma ===
Oklahoma within the US

Oklahoma Territory was said in 1892 by the governor of Oklahoma to be "about 85 percent white, 10 percent colored and 5 percent Indians". It was awarded statehood in 1907, with laws that enshrined racial segregation (Jim Crow laws). In 1911 Okemah's school had 555 white students and one black student. There were 147 recorded lynchings in Oklahoma between 1885 and 1930. Until statehood in 1907, most victims were white cattle rustlers or highwaymen. In all, 77 victims were white, 50 Black, 14 American Indians, five unknown, and one Chinese. Five women—two black, two white, and one other—were lynched in Oklahoma in four incidents between 1851 and 1946.

== People ==
=== Nelson family ===
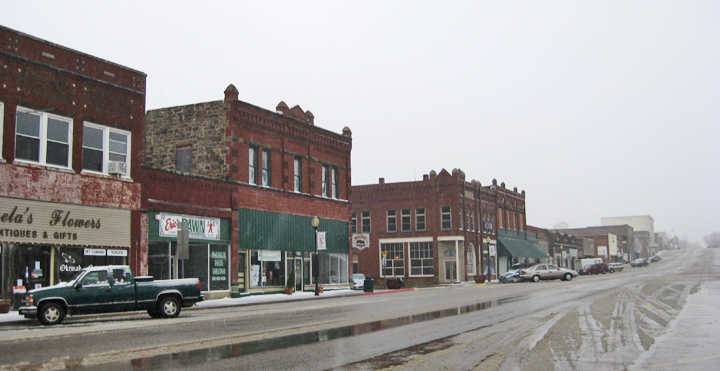
West Broadway Street, Okemah, 2010. The county jail was located at 510 West Broadway.

The Nelsons lived on a farm six miles north of Paden, Oklahoma, a largely White town. (Note: According to The Okemah Ledger, the Nelsons were "a portion of the Lincoln County Nelsons that were terrors in their colony, and have lived north of Paden but a short time".) Austin Nelson was born in Waco, Texas, in 1873. According to historian Frances Jones-Sneed, his parents, Dave and Rhoda Nelson, had been born into slavery in Georgia; Dave Nelson worked as a molder in Waco.

Austin and Laura married in 1896; L. D. was born the next year. (L. D. was regularly referred to after the lynching as L. W. or Lawrence.) (Note: The Okemah Ledger called him "L. W. Nelson", as did James Allen in his Without Sanctuary: Lynching Photography in America (2000). Several secondary sources called him "Lawrence", without citing their sources. Several primary sources referred to Laura as "Mary". The Okemah Ledger called Austin Nelson "Oscar".) In 1900 the extended family moved to Pottawatomie County, Oklahoma. According to Jones-Sneed, Laura and Austin were listed in the 1910 census as having two children, L. D., aged 13, and Carrie, aged two. It is not known what became of Carrie. She was probably the baby whom one witness said survived the lynching; several sources said she was found floating in the river.

=== George Loney ===
Around 35 years old when he died, Deputy Sheriff George H. Loney had lived in Paden for several years and was held in the highest regard, according to The Okemah Ledger. Described by the newspaper as a fearless man, he was known for having helped to stop the practice of bootlegging in Paden, on behalf of supporters of the local temperance movement. Later he became a state enforcement officer, then deputy sheriff. He was buried in Lincoln County near Paden on May 4, 1911. The Ledger wrote that every office in the courthouse closed for an hour during his funeral.

== Death of Loney ==
=== Shooting ===
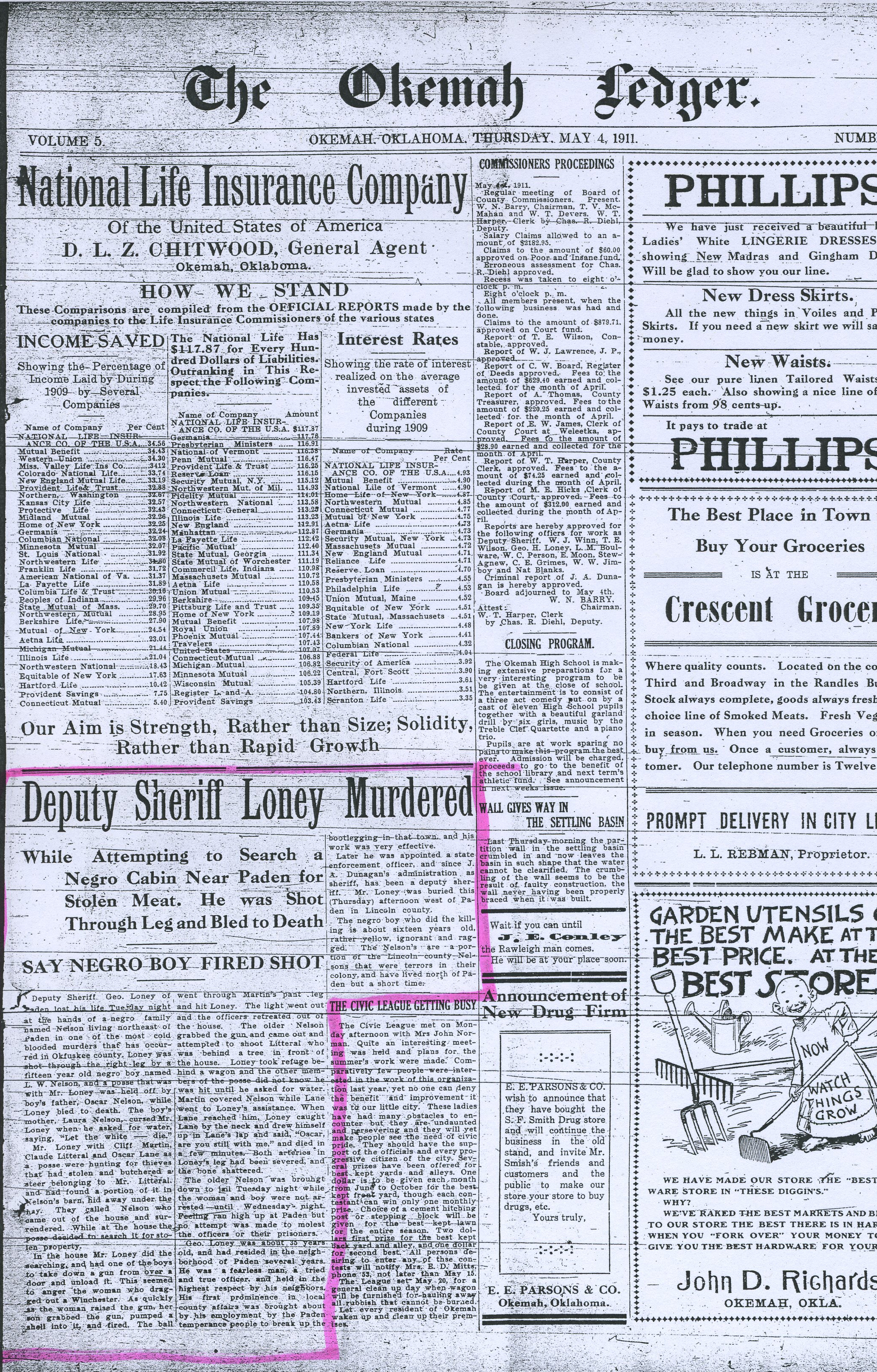
Front page of The Okemah Ledger, May 4, 1911.

George Loney formed a posse consisting of himself, Constable Cliff Martin, Claude Littrell, and Oscar Lane, after a steer was stolen from Littrell's property in Paden on May 1. Littrell obtained a search warrant from A. W. Jenkins, a Justice of the Peace, which allowed the men to search the Nelsons' farm. They arrived there on May 2 at around 9 pm, and read the warrant to Austin Nelson before entering the house. The steer's remains were found in either the barn or house.

When the men entered the Nelsons' home, Loney asked Constable Martin to take the cap off a muzzle-loading shotgun that was hanging on the wall. The Independent reported that, as Martin reached for the gun, Laura Nelson said: "Look here, boss, that gun belongs to me!" Martin said he told her that he wanted only to unload the gun.

The Independent and Ledger offered different versions of events. According to the Independent, which was more sympathetic to the Nelsons, Laura grabbed another gun, a Winchester rifle hidden behind a trunk. L. D. took hold of the Winchester at the same time, and during the struggle for the gun, it went off. A bullet passed through Constable Martin's pant legs, grazing him in the thigh, then hit Loney in the hip and entered his abdomen. He walked outside and died a few minutes later.

According to the Ledger, L. D. had grabbed the Winchester, pumped a shell into it, and fired. Austin had then taken hold of the rifle and tried to shoot Littrell, the newspaper said. During the ensuing gunfight, Loney had taken shelter behind a wagon. No one realized he had been hit until he asked for water; according to the newspaper, Laura responded: "Let the white ____ [sic] die." Loney reportedly bled to death within minutes. The Ledger described his death as "one of the most cold-blooded murders that has occurred in Okfuskee county".

=== Arrests and charges ===
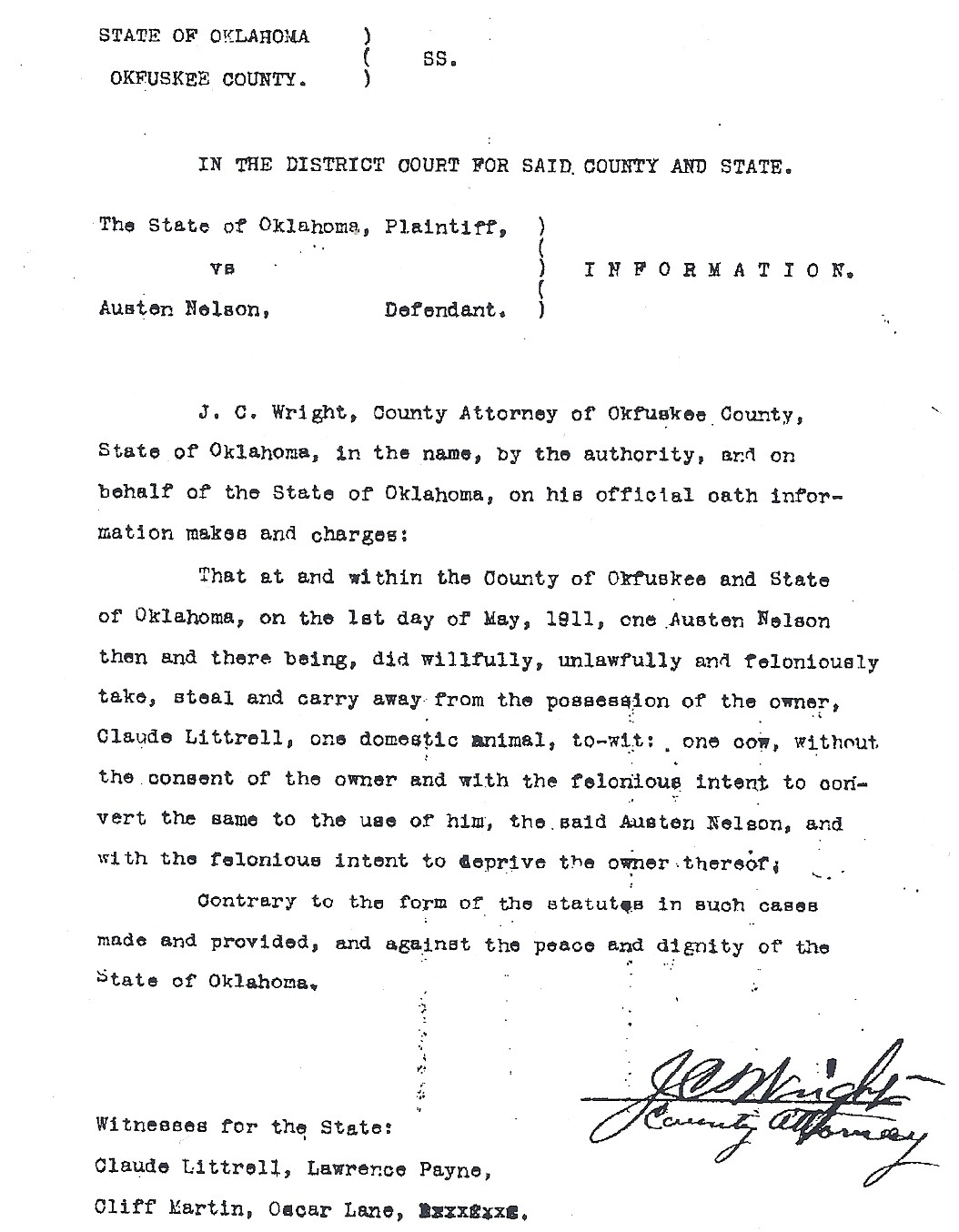
Austin Nelson's charge sheet

Austin was arrested by Constable Martin on the evening of the shooting; he arrived with Martin in Okemah at 4 am on Wednesday, May 3. The Okfuskee county jail was in Okemah, a predominantly white town. Laura and L. D., described by the Ledger as "about sixteen years old, rather yellow, ignorant and ragged", were arrested later that day. Sheriff Dunnegan found them at the home of the boy's uncle. According to The Independent, they made no effort to escape and were brought to the county jail on the night train.

Austin admitted the theft of the cow, saying he had had no food for his children. According to his undated charge sheet, witnesses for the state were Littrell, Martin, Lane, and Lawrence Payne. (Lawrence Payne was also the name of the jailer on duty the night the Nelsons were kidnapped from the jail.) Austin's account of what happened tallied with that of the posse, except that he said he was the one, not Laura, who had objected to the shotgun being removed from the wall. He said Laura had been trying to take the rifle away from her son when it was fired.

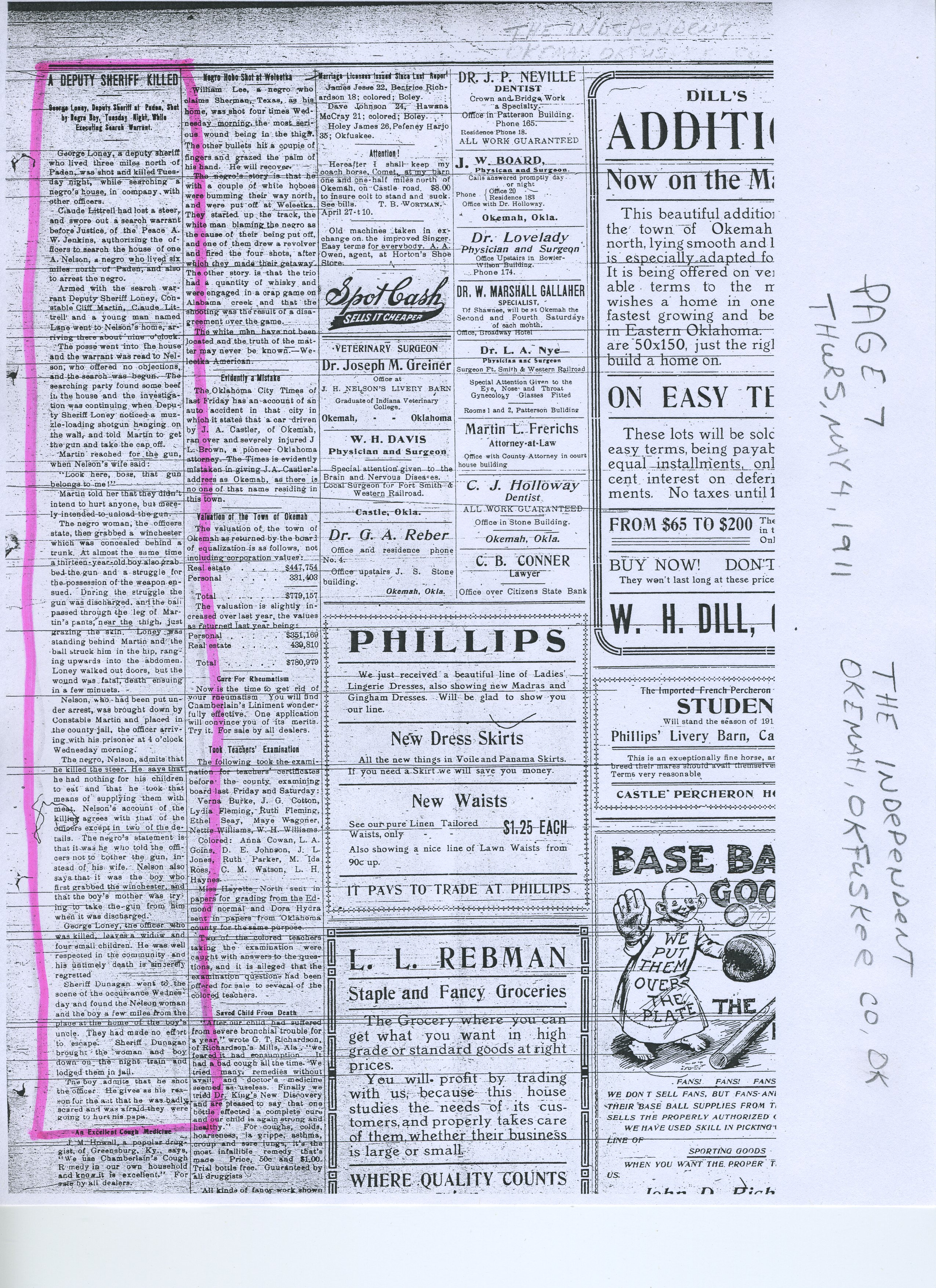
The Independent (Okemah), May 4, 1911, p. 7

During a hearing on May 6 before Justice Lawrence, Austin was held on a bond of $1,500, which he was unable to pay. After pleading guilty to larceny, he was sentenced on May 12 to three years in Oklahoma State Penitentiary. On May 16 he was sent to the state prison in McAlester 59 miles (95 km) away, which according to the Ledger probably saved his life. On May 10, before the same judge, Laura and L. D. (named by the Ledger as Mary and L. W. Nelson) were charged with murder and held without bail in the Okemah county jail. The Nelsons hired Blakeley, Maxey & Miley, a law firm in Shawnee, to represent them. The Ledger reported on May 18, under the headline "Negro Female Prisoner Gets Unruly", that on May 13 Laura had been "bad" when the jailer, Lawrence Payne, brought her dinner. She had reportedly tried to grab his gun when he opened the cell door, and when that failed she tried to throw herself out of a window. Payne "choked the woman loose", according to the newspaper, and after a struggle returned her to her cell. The Ledger wrote on May 25 that during the incident she had "begged to be killed".

== May 25, 1911 ==
=== Kidnap ===
Laura and L. D. were due to be arraigned on May 25. Between 11:30 and midnight on May 24, a group of between a dozen and 40 men arrived at the jail. They entered it through the front door of the sheriff's office. Payne, the jailer, said he had left it unlocked to let in a detective from McAlester, who was looking for an escaped prisoner. He said the men had bound, gagged and blindfolded him at gunpoint, taken his keys, and cut the telephone line. He was unable to identify them.

The boy was "stifled and gagged", according to the Ledger, and went quietly; prisoners in adjoining cells reportedly heard nothing. The men went to the women's cells and removed Laura, described by the newspaper as "very small of stature, very black, about thirty-five years old, and vicious". According to a July 1911 report in The Crisis (the magazine of the National Association for the Advancement of Colored People), and a female witness who said she had seen the lynching or its aftermath, the men also took the baby.

The jailer said that, after struggling for two hours, he escaped and raised the alarm at Moon's restaurant across the road from the jail. Sheriff Dunnegan sent out a search party to no avail. According to the Ledger, a fence post suspended on two chairs across a window was found in the jury room just after the lynching, near the cell where Laura had been held. It was thought that the men had intended to hang her out the window but had been deterred by an electric light burning nearby.

=== Lynching ===
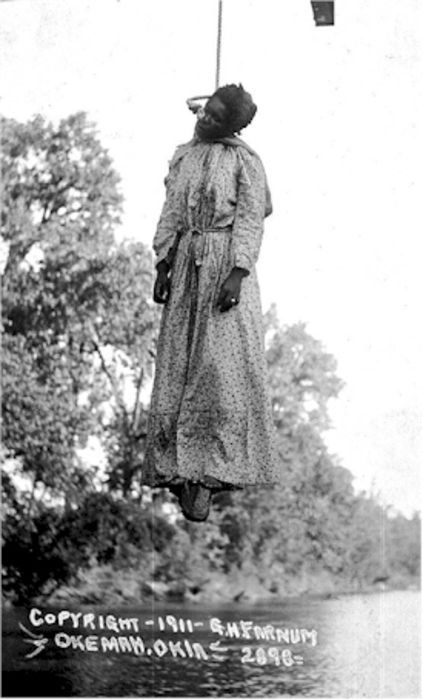
No. 2898

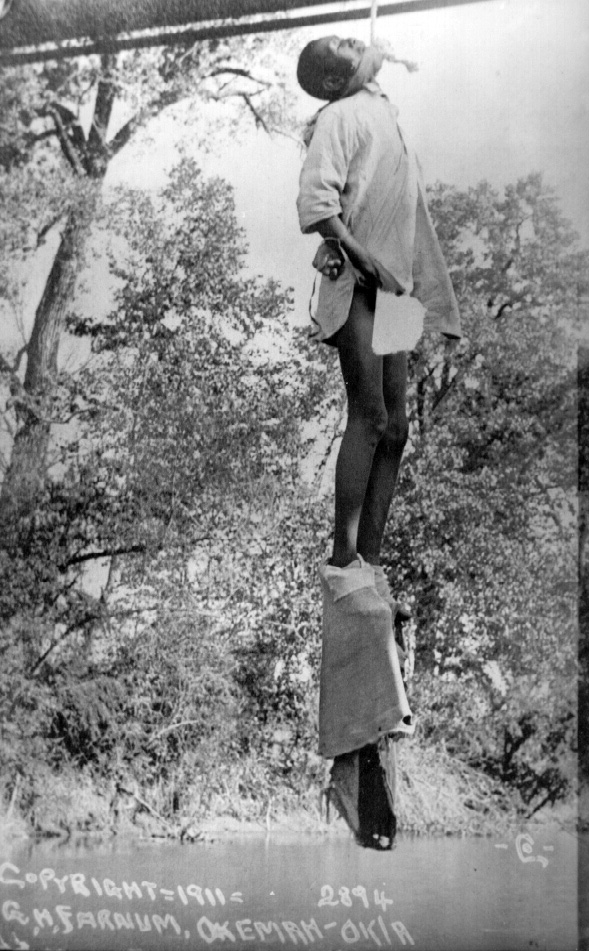
No. 2894

Laura and L. D. were taken to a bridge over the North Canadian River, six miles west and one mile south of Okemah; it was described as on the old Schoolton road and at Yarbrough's crossing. According to the Associated Press and The Crisis, Laura was raped. The Ledger reported that the men gagged her and L. D. with tow sacks and, using rope made of half-inch hemp tied in a hangman's knot and hanged them from the bridge. They were found in the morning hanging 20 ft below the middle span. A local resident, John Earnest, reported the discovery to the sheriff's office. The front page of The Okemah Ledger on May 25, 1911, said the lynching had been "executed with silent precision that makes it appear as a masterpiece of planning":

The woman's arms were swinging by her side, untied, while about twenty feet away swung the boy with his clothes partly torn off and his hands tided with a saddle string. The only marks on either body were that made by the ropes upon the necks. Gently swaying in the wind, the ghastly spectacle was discovered this morning by a negro boy taking his cow to water. Hundreds of people from Okemah and the western part of the county went to view the scene.

The bodies were cut down from the bridge at 11:00 on May 25 by order of the county commissioner, then taken to Okemah. The Nelsons' relatives did not claim the bodies, and they were buried by the county in the Greenleaf cemetery near Okemah. Quoting the Muskogee Scimitar, The Crisis wrote that Laura had had a baby with her: "Just think of it. A woman taken from her suckling babe, and a boy—a child only fourteen years old—dragged through the streets by a howling mob of fiendish devils, the most unnameable crime committed on the helpless woman and then she and her son executed by hanging." According to William Bittle and Gilbert Geis, writing in 1964, Laura had been caring for a baby in jail and had the child with her when she was taken from her cell. They quoted a local woman: "After they had hung them up, those men just walked off and left that baby lying there. One of my neighbors was there, and she picked the baby up and brought it to town, and we took care of it. It's all grown up now and lives here." (Note: William Bittle and Gilbert Geis (The Longest Way Home, 1964): "Mrs. Nelson had cared for an infant while in jail with her older son, and had taken the child with her when the mob came. She had put the baby on the ground when she was forced onto the bridge by the crowd. "A woman who witnessed the scene painfully described it: 'After they had hung them up, those men just walked off and left that baby lying there. One of my neighbors was there, and she picked the baby up and brought it to town, and we took care of it. It's all grown up now and lives here. [...]'")

=== Photographs ===
The scene after the lynching was recorded in a series of photographs by George Henry Farnum, the owner of Okemah's only photography studio. There are four known extant images taken from a boat. Photographs nos. 2894 and 2898 are close-up shots of L. D. and Laura; nos. 2897 and 2899 show the bridge and spectators. In no. 2899, 35 men and six women are on the bridge, along with 17 children, from toddlers to mid-teens. The photographs are marked with the photographer's name: "COPYRIGHT—1911—G. H. FARNUM, OKEMAH, OKLA."

It was common practice to turn lynching photographs into postcards. In May 1908, in an effort to stop the practice, the federal government amended the United States Postal Laws and Regulations to prevent "matter of a character tending to incite arson, murder or assassination" from being sent through the mail. The cards continued to sell, although not openly, and were sent instead in envelopes. Woody Guthrie said he recalled seeing the cards of the Nelsons for sale in Okemah. (Note: Woody Guthrie: "It reminded me of the postcard picture they sold in my home town for several years, a showing you a negro mother, and her two young sons, a hanging by the neck stretched tight by the weight of their bodies and – the rope stretched tight like a big fiddle string." Klein wrote in 1999 that the Okemah Ledger published one of the images, but he did not give a date. Jones-Sneed (2011): "Unlike other lynching photographs, the one of Laura Nelson and her son was not published in any newspapers or made into postcards. The photographer, G. H. Farnam, kept the negative and may have provided copies for those who wished to have a memento of the mother and son.") James Allen bought the photo postcard of Laura Nelson, a 3 1/2 x 5 1/2 inch gelatin silver print, for $75 in a flea market. The back of the card says "unmailable".

Seth Archer wrote in the Southwest Review that lynching photographs were partly intended as a warning, in the Nelson's case to the neighboring all-black Boley—"look what we did here, Negroes beware"— but the practice of sending cards to family and friends outside the area underlined the ritualistic nature of the lynchings. Spectators appearing in lynching photographs showed no obvious shame at being connected to the events, even when they were clearly identifiable. Someone wrote on the back of one card, of the 1915 Will Stanley lynching in Temple, Texas: "This is the Barbecue we had last night My picture is to the left with a cross over it your son Joe."

== Aftermath ==
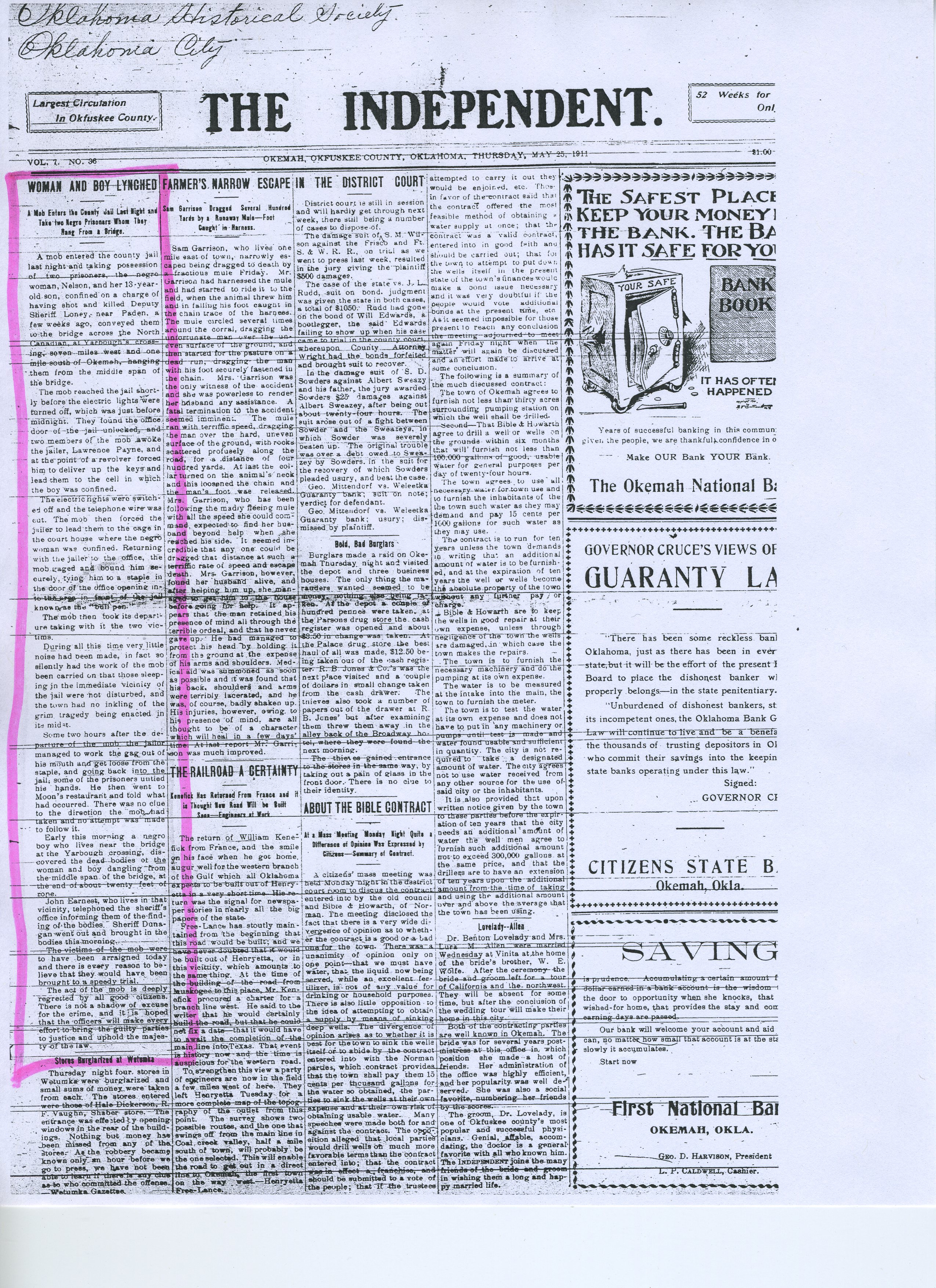
The Independent, May 25, 1911

The Independent wrote on May 25, 1911, that "[t]here is not a shadow of an excuse for the crime", and later called it a "terrible blot on Okfuskee County, a reproach that it will take years to remove". The Okemah Ledger took the view that "while the general sentiment is adverse to the method, it is generally thought that the negroes got what would have been due them under due process of law." One newspaper, the Morning Phoenix, apparently tried to blame the black community, writing that the Nelsons had been "mobbed by Negroes". African-Americans expressed outrage. One black journal lamented:

Oh! where is that christian spirit we hear so much about

– What will the good citizens do to apprehend these mobs

– Wait, we shall see – Comment is unnecessary. Such a crime is simply Hell on Earth. No excuse can be set forth to justify the act.

There were rumors that the nearby black town of Boley was organizing an attack on Okemah. Okemah's women and children were sent to spend the night in a nearby field, with the men standing guard on Main Street. Oswald Garrison Villard of the National Association for the Advancement of Colored People (NAACP), wrote in protest to Lee Cruce, governor of Oklahoma. Cruce assured Villard he would do everything he could to bring the Nelson's killers to justice. In a reply to Villard dated June 9, 1911, Cruce called the lynching an "outrage", but he defended the laws of Oklahoma as "adequate" and its juries "competent", and said the administration of justice in the state proceeded with little cause for criticism, "except in cases of extreme passion, which no law and no civilization can control". He added:

There is a race prejudice that exists between the white and Negro races wherever the Negroes are found in large numbers. [...] Just this week the announcement comes as a shock to the people of Oklahoma that the Secretary of the Interior [...] has appointed a Negro from Kansas to come to Oklahoma and take charge of the supervision of the Indian schools of this State. There is no race of people on earth that has more antipathy for the Negro race than the Indian race, and yet these people, numbering many of the best citizens of this State and nation, are to be humbled and their prejudices and passions are to be increased by having this outrage imposed upon them [...] If your organization would interest itself to the extent of seeing that such outrages as this are not perpetrated against our people, there would be fewer lynchings in the South than at this time [...]

The NAACP argued that nothing would change while governors like Cruce sought to excuse lynching as the product of the "uncontrollable passion" of white people. District Judge John Caruthers convened a grand jury in June 1911 to investigate, telling them it was the duty of people "of a superior race and of greater intelligence to protect this weaker race from unjustifiable and lawless attacks", but no one would identify the lynchers. (Note: District Judge John Caruthers (June 1911): "The people of the state have said by recently adopted constitutional provision that the race to which the unfortunate victims belonged should in large measure be divorced from participation in our political contests, because of their known racial inferiority and their dependent credulity, which very characteristic made them the mere tool of the designing and cunning. It is well known that I heartily concur in this constitutional provision of the people's will. The more then does the duty devolve upon us of a superior race and of greater intelligence to protect this weaker race from unjustifiable and lawless attacks.")

== Legacy ==
=== Photographs ===
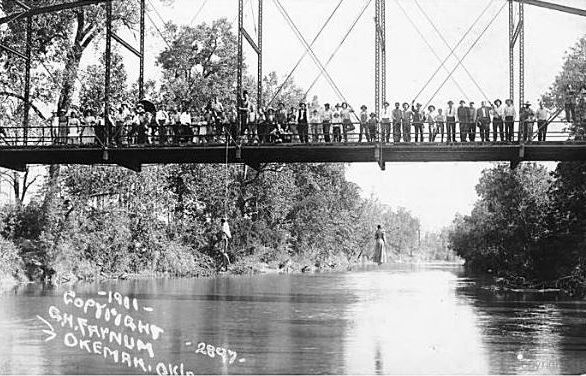
No. 2897

James Allen, an Atlanta antique collector, spent years looking for postcards of lynchings for his Without Sanctuary: Lynching Photography in America (2000). "Hundreds of flea markets later," he wrote, "a trader pulled me aside and in conspiratorial tones offered to sell me a real photo postcard. It was Laura Nelson hanging from a bridge, caught so pitiful and tattered and beyond retrieving—like a paper kite sagged on a utility wire."

The book accompanied an exhibition of 60 lynching postcards from 1880 to 1960, Witness: Photographs of Lynchings from the Collection of James Allen, which opened at the Roth Horowitz Gallery in New York in January 2000. Allen argued that lynching photographers were more than passive spectators. They positioned and lit the corpses as if they were game birds, he wrote, and the postcards became an important part of the act, emphasizing its political nature.

Allen's publication of the images encountered a mixed reception. Julia Hotton, a black museum curator in New York, said that with older black people especially: "If they hear a white man with a Southern accent is collecting these photos, they get a little skittish." Jennie Lightweis-Gof was critical of the "profoundly aestheticized readings" of Laura's body, arguing that writers tried to garner empathy for the Nelsons by focusing on Laura's appearance, producing empathy qua eroticism. Allen, for example, referred to Laura's "indissoluble femininity". Leightweis-Gof offered this as an example of "the Gaze": "the sense that every function of the female body is sexualized and aestheticized". Wendy Wolters argued that whenever Laura Nelson is viewed as a "fetishized and feminized object", she is violated again.

=== Guthries ===
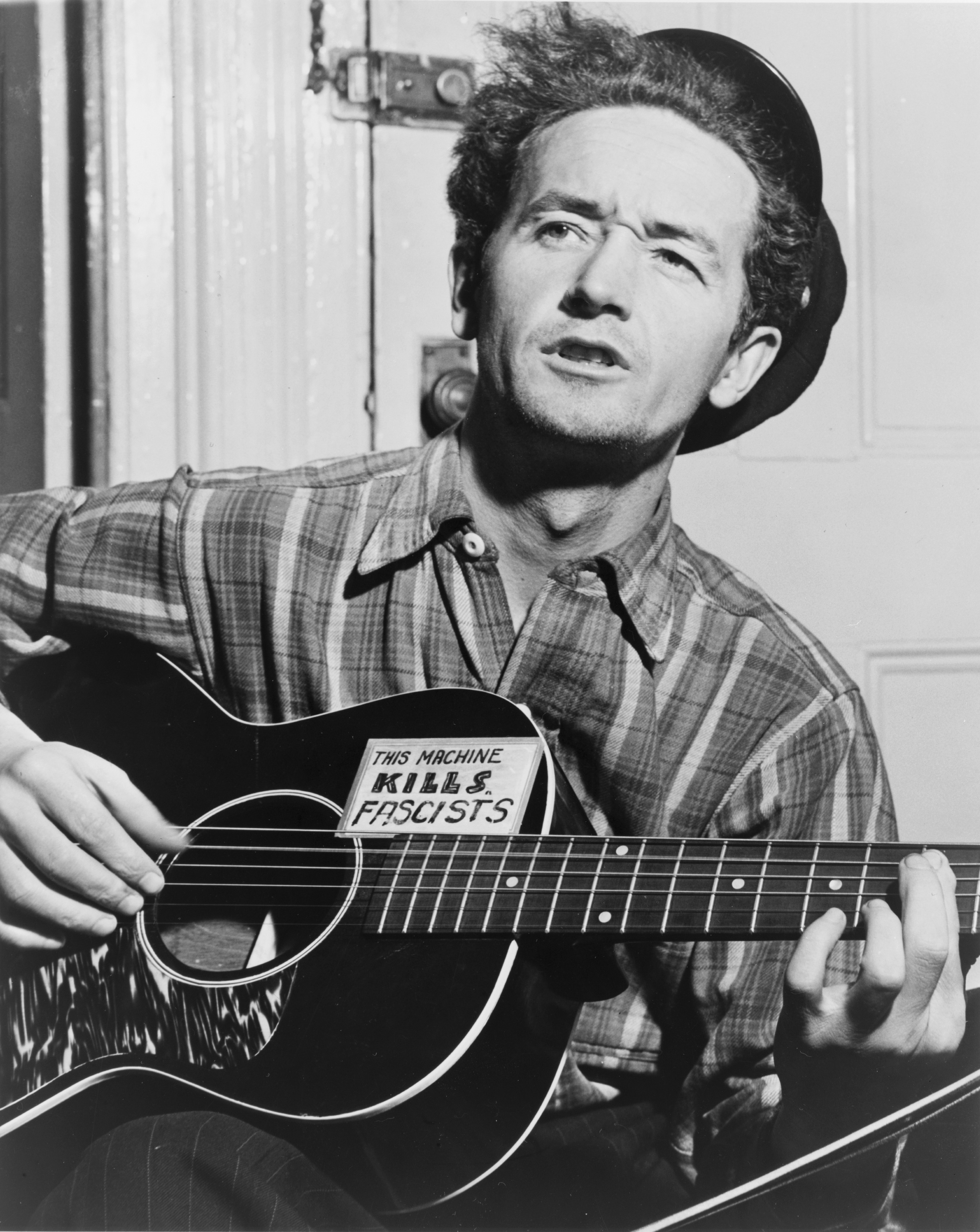
Woody Guthrie (1912–1967)

One of the lynchers may have been Charley Guthrie (died 1956), father of the folk singer Woody Guthrie, who was born in Okemah in 1912, 14 months after the lynching. Charley was an Okemah real-estate agent, district court clerk, Democratic politician, Freemason, and owner of the town's first automobile. According to Joe Klein, he was also a member of the Ku Klux Klan in the 1920s. There is no documentary evidence to support this; the allegation stems from his younger brother, Claude, whom Klein interviewed on tape in 1977 for his book Woody Guthrie: A Life (1980). Klein published that Charley had been part of the lynching mob, but without referring to the interview. Seth Archer found the tape in 2005 in the Woody Guthrie Archives in New York, and reported Claude's statement in the Southwest Review in 2006. During the interview, Claude Guthrie told Klein:

It was pretty bad back there in them days [...] The niggers was pretty bad over there in Boley, you know [...] Charley and them, they throwed this nigger and his mother in jail, both of them, the boy and the woman. And that night, why they stuck out and hung [laughter], they hung them niggers that killed that sheriff [...] I just kind of laughed [laughter]. I knew darn well that rascal [Charley] was—I knew he was in on it.

Woody Guthrie wrote two songs, unrecorded, about the Nelsons' lynching, "Don't Kill My Baby and My Son" and "High Balladree". The songs refer to a woman and two sons hanging. (Note: Woody Guthrie, "Don't Kill My Baby and My Son" (1966): "Then I saw a picture on a postcard / It showed the Canadian River Bridge, / Three bodies hanging to swing in the wind, / A mother and two sons they'd lynched." Guthrie, "High Balladree": "A nickel postcard I buy off your rack / To show you what happens if / You're black and fight back / A lady and two boys hanging / down by their necks / From the rusty iron rigs / of my Canadian Bridge.") His work was not always historically accurate; for example, he wrote elsewhere that he had witnessed some of the Nelsons' troubles, although he was born 14 months after their death. Guthrie recorded another song, "Slipknot", about lynching in Okemah in general. In one manuscript, he added at the end of the song: "Dedicated to the many negro mothers, fathers, and sons alike, that was lynched and hanged under the bridge of the Canadian River, seven miles south of Okemah, Okla., and to the day when such will be no more" (signed Woody G., February 29, 1940, New York). He also sketched a bridge in 1946 from which a row of lynched bodies hang; the sketch is held by the Ralph Rinzler archives in the Smithsonian.

== See also ==
- Ida B. Wells – American journalist and civil rights activist (1862–1931)
- "Strange Fruit" (1937) by Abel Meeropol
- Tulsa race massacre – 1921 mass violence in Oklahoma, US

== Works cited ==
- Allen, James (2000). Without Sanctuary: Lynching Photography in America. Santa Fe: Twin Palms Publishers.
- Apel, Dora (2004). Imagery of Lynching: Black Men, White Women, and the Mob. New Brunswick: Rutgers University Press.
- Apel, Dora; Smith, Shawn Michelle (2007). Lynching Photographs. Berkeley: University of California Press.
- Archer, Seth (September 22, 2006). "Reading the Riot Acts". Southwest Review. 91 (4): 500–516. JSTOR 43472750.
- Bittle, William E.; Geis, Gilbert (1964). The Longest Way Home: Chief Alfred C. Sam's Back-to-Africa Movement. Detroit: Wayne State University Press.
- Collins, Rob (May 24, 2011). "Picture of horror". Oklahoma Gazette. Archived from the original on May 2, 2018.
- Cray, Ed (2006). The Life and Times of Woody Guthrie. New York: W. W. Norton.
- Davidson, James West (2007). "They say": Ida B. Wells and the Reconstruction of Race. New York: Oxford University Press.
- Everett, Diana (2007). "Lynching". Encyclopedia of Oklahoma History and Culture. Oklahoma City: Oklahoma Historical Society. Archived from the original on January 15, 2011.
- Freeman, Elisabeth (July 1916). "The Waco Horror" (PDF). The Crisis. 12 (3, supplement).
- Kennedy, Randall (1998). Race, Crime, and the Law. New York: Vintage Books.
- Klein, Joe (1999) [1980]. Woody Guthrie: A Life. New York: Bantam Dell.
- Kaufman, Will (2011). Woody Guthrie, American Radical. Chicago: University of Illinois Press.
- Jackson, Mark Allan (2008). Prophet Singer: The Voice and Vision of Woody Guthrie. Jackson: University Press of Mississippi. ISBN 9781578069156.
- Jones-Sneed, Frances (2011). "Gender, Race and the Antilynching Crusade in the United States" (PDF). The Mind's Eye. pp. 59–73. Archived from the original (PDF) on February 1, 2014.
- Kidada, Williams (2012). They Left Great Marks on Me: African American Testimonies of Racial Violence from Emancipation to World War I. New York and London: New York University Press.
- Leightweis-Gof, Jennie (2011). "The Lynched Woman: Kara Walker, Laura Nelson, and the Question of Agency". Blood at the Root: Lynching as American Cultural Nucleus. Albany: State University of New York Press.
- Menig, Harry (1998). "Woody Guthrie: The Oklahoma Years, 1912–1929". In Joyce, David D. (ed.). An Oklahoma I Had Never Seen Before. Norman: University of Oklahoma Press.
- Mintz, S.; McNeil, Sara (2016). "The Anti-Lynching Crusaders". Digital History. Archived from the original on December 19, 2018.
- Moehringer, J. R. (August 27, 2000). "An Obsessive Quest to Make People See". Los Angeles Times.
- Rushdy, Ashraf H. A. (2012). The End of American Lynching. New Brunswick and London: Rutgers University Press. ISBN 978-0813552927.
- Segrave, Kerry (2010). Lynchings of Women in the United States: The Recorded Cases. 1851–1946. Jefferson: McFarland.
- Shepard, R. Bruce (Winter 1983). "Diplomatic Racism: Canadian Government and Black Migration from Oklahoma, 1905–1912". Great Plains Quarterly: 5–16.
- Thurston, Robert W. (2013). Lynching: American Mob Murder in Global Perspective. Farnham: Ashgate Publishing.
- Wolters, Wendy (2004). "Without Sanctuary: Bearing Witness, Bearing Whiteness". JAC: A Journal of Composition Theory. 24 (2): 399–425. JSTOR 20866631.
- Wood, Amy Louise (2009). Lynching and Spectacle: Witnessing Racial Violence in America, 1890–1940. Chapel Hill: The University of North Carolina Press. ISBN 9780807832547.
- Zangrando, Robert L. (1980). The NAACP Crusade Against Lynching, 1909–1950. Philadelphia: Temple University Press.

Contemporaneous articles

- "A Deputy Sheriff Killed", The Independent (Okemah), May 4, 1911 (published weekly 1907–1914).
- "Deputy Sheriff Loney Murdered", The Okemah Ledger, May 4, 1911 (published weekly 1907–1933).
- "The Nelsons Have Examination", The Independent, May 11, 1911.
- "Negro Female Prisoner Gets Unruly", The Okemah Ledger, May 18, 1911.
- "Lynchers Avenge the Murder of Geo. Loney". The Okemah Ledger. May 25, 1911.
- "Woman and boy lynched", The Independent, May 25, 1911.
- "Woman Lynched by Side of Son", The Daily Oklahoman, May 26, 1911.
- "Report of the lynching" (PDF). The Crisis. 2 (3): 99–100. July 1911.
- "The Oklahoma Lynching" (PDF). The Crisis. 2 (4): 153–154. August 1911.
