= Scott Decker =

American criminologist

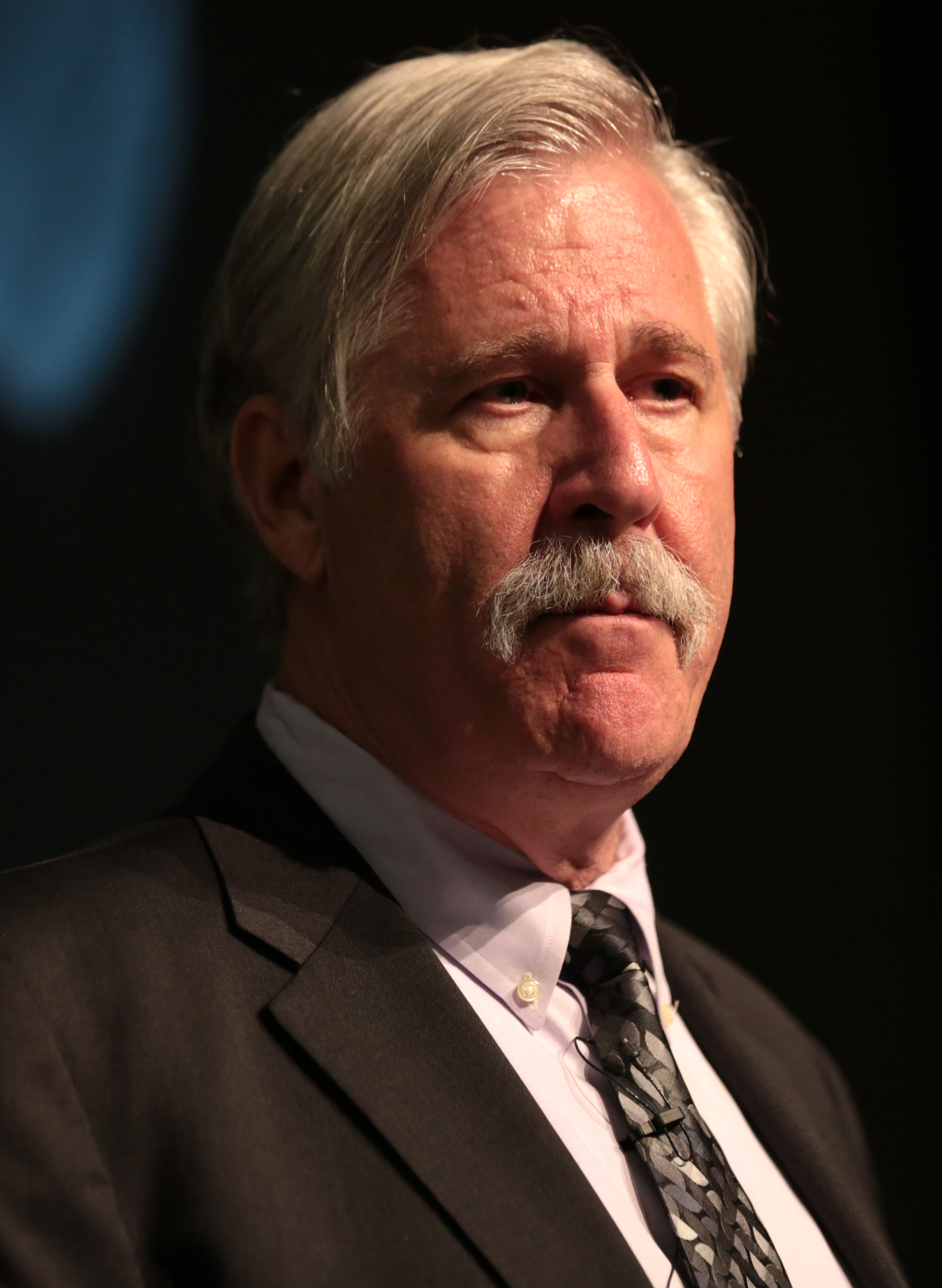
- Scott Decker in 2017
- Born: Scott Henderson Decker; July 17, 1950 (age 76)
- Education: DePauw University, Florida State University
- Awards: 1989 Chancellor's Award for Excellence in Research from the University of Missouri-St. Louis, Fellow of the Academy of Criminal Justice Sciences (ACJS) since 2007, 2011 Bruce Smith Award from the ACJS
- Scientific career
- Fields: Criminology
- Workplaces: Arizona State University, University of Missouri-St. Louis
- Thesis: Criminalization, victimization and structural correlates of twenty six American cities (1976)

Scott H. Decker (born July 17, 1950) is an American criminologist and Foundation Professor of Criminology and Criminal Justice at Arizona State University (ASU). He is known for researching gang violence and criminal justice policy.

== Education ==
Decker received his B.A. from DePauw University in 1972, and his M.A. and Ph.D. in criminology from Florida State University in 1974 and 1976, respectively.

== Career ==
Decker joined the faculty of the University of Missouri-St. Louis in 1977 as an assistant professor in the Department of Criminology and Criminal Justice. In 1986, he became a full professor at the University of Missouri-St. Louis, and in 2001, he was named a curator's professor there. In 2006, he left the University of Missouri to join the faculty at Arizona State University, where he was named a Foundation Professor in 2010 and an Honors College Professor in 2014. From 2006 to 2014, he was the first director of Arizona State University's School of Criminology and Criminal Justice. In 2015, he became the first director of ASU's Center for Public Criminology.
