= Antique toy show =

An Antique toy show is one of several toy shows held throughout the United States (and around the world), usually on an annual basis, that is devoted to the exhibition, for sale, of antique toys, dolls and collectible paraphernalia. Toy shows are generally regional in nature, and cater to a certain geographic area of the country. The larger shows, such as the Miami Antique Toy Show and the Chicago Toy Show and the Greater Boston Antique and Collectible Toy Show encompass a broader clientele.

== Introduction ==
Dealers and collectors from across the country and around the world to attend these shows. The Miami Toy Show typically attracts guests from South America, Canada, and Europe, as well as drawing attention from the local market (for instance, South Florida). Other large toy shows, like those held annually in Chicago and in Glendale CA, York PA and Kalamazoo MI also benefit from international, as well as local, exposure. The larger shows are usually held once each year, at about the same time each year. These shows tend to have been in existence for longer periods of time – usually for decades, and typically retain the same management over years. For example, Steve Fuller and Tom Graboski, the Miami show's producers, staged their first show in 1979. The Illinois and Pennsylvania shows, among others, have been in continuous operation even prior to that date; Dale Kelley has been producing the Chicago (St. Charles) show since 1971, and he does so twice each year.

Monthly magazines that are oriented towards antique toy collectors and dealers, including the conventionally published Antique Toy World and the web-based all-digital 'magazine' Toy Collector Magazine, typically feature calendars of upcoming antique toy show events, to guide and inform dealers and collectors alike. Nevertheless, there remains a certain predictability of occurrence, so that the toy show community can reasonably expect the Miami Antique Toy Show to be produced during the first or second week in February, the Chicago (St. Charles) Toy Show in March/April (and again in September/October), the Toledo show in late April, and the York show on the Thanksgiving weekend, for example.

The larger annual or bi-annual regional antique toy shows may prevail nowadays, but in the heyday of traditional toy collecting – before the internet auction sites became popular – smaller shows proliferated. For example, in the State of Florida, there might have been as many as half a dozen similar shows scheduled in any given thirty-day period. A typical monthly calendar in as recently as 1995 would find Florida shows devoted exclusively to the buying and selling of antique toys, dolls and collectibles being held in such geographically diverse locations (hundreds of miles apart) as West Palm Beach, Sarasota, Winter Park, Hialeah, Ocala and Ft. Lauderdale. Today, these shows are all but defunct, and the Miami show is probably the best opportunity to see and shop for exclusively antique toys in Florida, and possibly the Southeastern United States (huge annual regional shows, like ones held in Atlanta GA and Mars Hill NC, are sadly no longer being produced). Other 'flagship' shows like those in York, Glendale, Kalamazoo, Toledo, Chicago and Boston can make the same claim for their own regions. The smaller but more frequent antique toy shows have not completely disappeared, however. Although in decline, comparatively speaking the frequency of these smaller toy shows held in the Northeastern US and in the Midwestern US is greater than elsewhere in the country, and the antique toy magazine event calendars bear this out nearly every month.

== Antiques ==
The generally accepted common usage of the term Antique, when applied to toys, describes those toys that were manufactured or otherwise created at least twenty-five years ago. Often, a toy manufacturer will reissue a toy from time to time, but its mere reissuance will not prohibit the reissued toy from itself correctly being identified as antique (many Lionel trains, for example, that were first issued in the 1950s have been reissued in the 1980s: each issue, as long as it is 25 years old, can fairly be termed 'antique'). Other areas of collecting, including those of furniture and automobiles, may have different criteria: the standard for furniture is generally that it must be at least 100 years old to qualify for tariff exemption (according to, for instance, the producers of the PBS television series 'Antiques Roadshow'), although there is considerable discussion and disagreement within the antique dealer profession; the standard for automobiles is 25 years or older (Antique Automobile Club of America, rule adopted in 1975).

== Toys ==
The term Toy, when referring to the items displayed for sale at a toy show, includes not only those things for children to play with but also to objects that, while originally meant for children's use, remain items of pure collectible desirability. Many sellers and dealers of antique toys never intend to play with them at all. Rather, they may intend to acquire them for the purpose of informal or formal display. (A few toy collectors simply wish to amass as many toys as possible without regard to visually sharing them, however – these 'hoarders' are in the minority.) 'Toys' at these shows can, and usually do include, examples of dolls, trains, tin toys, die-cast vehicles, pressed steel toys, play sets, plastic kits, soldiers, 'character' items (based on popular cartoons, television shows, motion pictures, etc.) and other objects of childhood memorabilia.

== Dolls ==
The definition of Doll is also broadly construed, but it also typically refers to items associated with childhood. A 'doll' is usually small, and is a representational object of a human being (similar small objects that are instead representational of animals are known as miniatures). It has play value and so may be referred to as a toy (although it may never have been played with!), and can be a puppet or a marionette, or have no moving parts at all. But within the sphere of antique toys, dolls include not only the classic 'baby' variety but also the jointed (and heavily accessorized) soldiers first popular in the 1960s as well as the detailed 4" action figures modeled after the casts of television shows and movies, that became the collector rage in the mid-1970s. While local and regional collectors' groups may host a show devoted specifically to dolls, the larger antique toy shows, like those in Miami, Toledo and Kalamazoo, are dedicated to all manner of childhood memorabilia and actively seek to include doll collectors among their dealers.

== Collectibles ==
On the other hand, Collectibles, as used in the toy show context, may or may not refer to purely childhood items. Antique political campaign buttons, greeting cards, post cards and license plates all accurately fall under the 'collectibles' umbrella, and none of them were ever designed or manufactured to be "things for children to play with." Dealers that offer collectibles often specialize in a particular area of interest, so it would not be uncommon for a toy show dealer to collect, and sell, items related to a particular manufacturer – of say, soft drinks – or to particular industry – petroleum products collectors specialize in petroliana – or even to a particular 'license holder' – those that collect Walt Disney character related (and other) items are involved in the area of Disneyana.

== Shows ==
A Show, another term for 'meet' or 'event' (in several countries, 'fair') simply describes the forum for the exhibition of the toys, dolls and collectibles. A show may be held in the meeting rooms of a hotel (the Miami show does this, as does the Boston show, and the producers will typically choose a venue near the area's metropolitan/international airport for the convenience of dealers and guests alike), or in the large buildings at a fairground (the Chicago, York and Toledo shows are good examples), or at any other site that is simply large enough, and provides enough parking space, to meet the needs of the sellers and buyers. Within the given exhibition space, dealers will set up their toys, dolls and collectibles on tables that generally are 30" x 72" each, and are sometimes (as in Miami) 30" x 96" each. One dealer may only need a single table for his display, but the next dealer may need six or eight contiguous tables for the same purpose. The tables, including their set-up, are provided by the host facility. The facility charges the toy show promoter a fee for each table, and that fee is passed on to the dealer. The promoters and organizers work with the venue's management to arrive at an effective, efficient floor plan layout of the tables, for the comfort of all the dealers and attendees.

Shows open to the public for about six to eight hours per day. The Miami show is held on a Sunday only, but some shows have both Saturday and Sunday access. Once the show's gates are opened (times vary: ten o'clock in Miami, eight o'clock in Chicago and York, for example), dealers and collectors (after paying a modest admission fee, usually $7 or less) are free to negotiate arms length transactions to establish the fair market value of a given toy (a series of these transaction results may establish the 'reserve price' for a similar toy sold at a conventional auction, however), one toy at a time. Toy shows are otherwise unlike an auction, and other alternate ways to acquire antique toys, in nearly every respect. Chiefly, they are not at all like the mail-order or internet methods because at a Toy Show, a prospective buyer can hold and touch the object of their interest. The buyer can thoroughly examine the article, and discuss with the dealer in detail the condition, the provenance, and other important aspects of the purchase. A toy show offers the excitement of a live event, and provides the opportunity for dealers and collectors to experience and share their enthusiasm in their common interest. Of course, any antique toy show also offers the undeniable pleasure of buyers obtaining their prize purchases the moment the 'deal' is 'sealed' – something that is impossible to achieve through mail order and internet sales – to then immediately take home and enjoy.

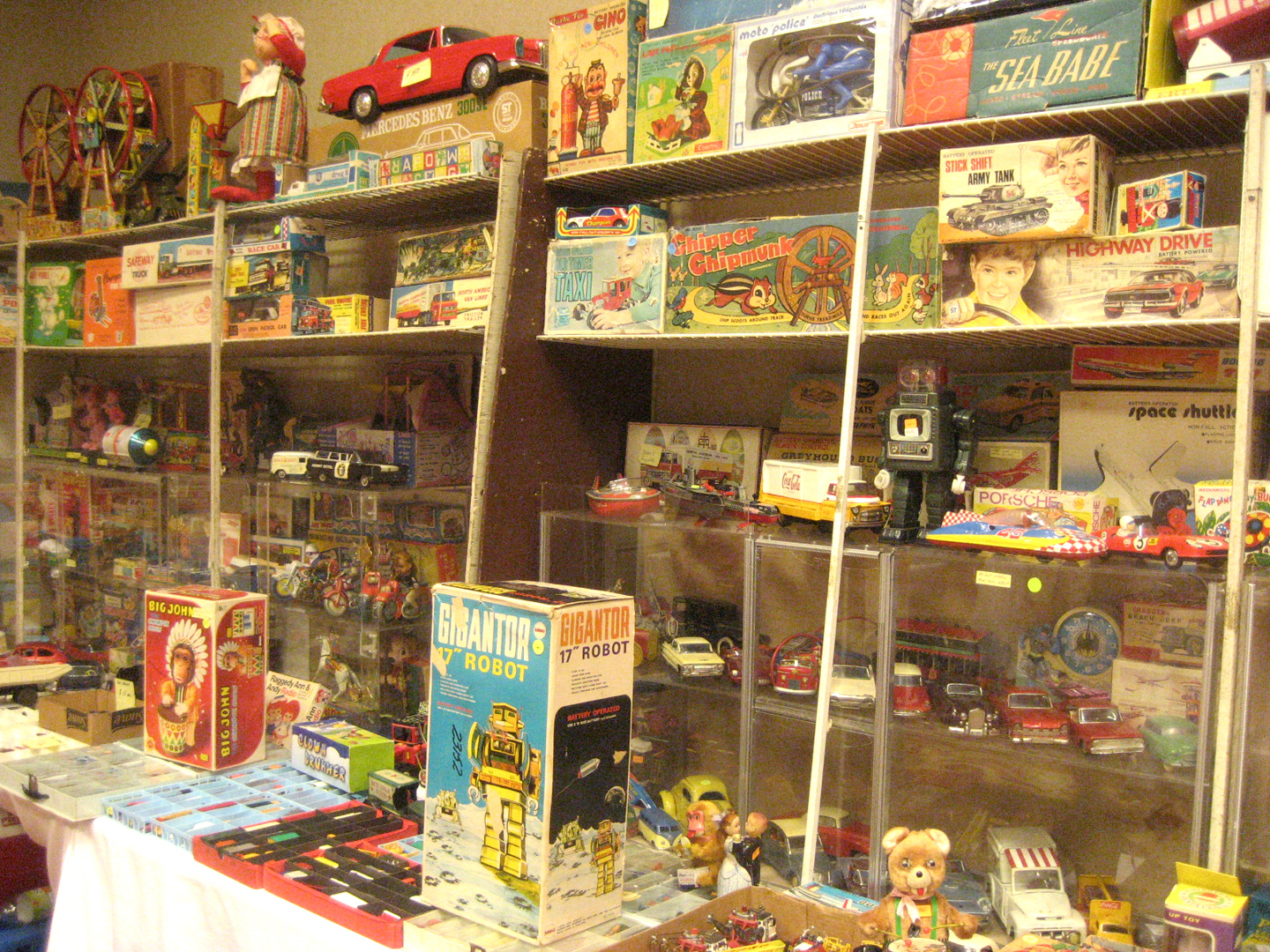
Antique Toy Show: Typical dealer display

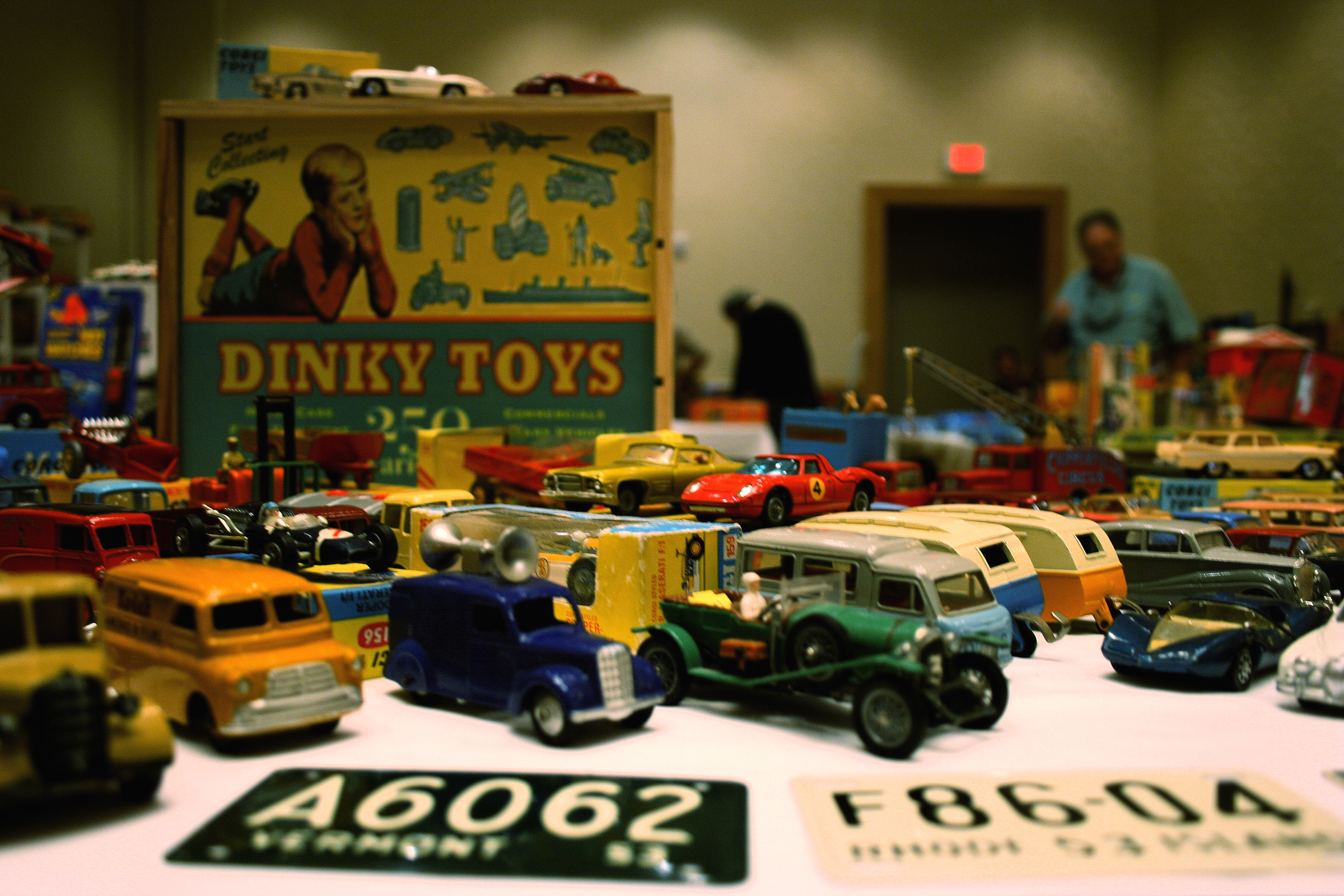
Antique Toy Show: Typical postwar diecast dealer table
