= Gilbert Geis =

American criminologist (1925–2012)

- Born: Gilbert Lawrence Geis; January 10, 1925; New York City, New York
- Died: November 10, 2012 (aged 87)
- Education: Colgate University; Brigham Young University; University of Wisconsin–Madison
- Known for: Research on white-collar crime
- Awards: Edwin H. Sutherland Award (1985)
- Scientific career
- Fields: Criminology
- Institutions: University of California, Irvine
- Thesis: American motion pictures in Norway: a study in international mass communications (1953)
- Notable students: Richard T. Wright (criminologist) John Braithwaite

Gilbert Lawrence Geis (January 10, 1925 – November 10, 2012) was an American criminologist known for his research on white-collar crime. He is particularly recognized for his paper "The Heavy Electric Equipment Antitrust Case of 1961", originally published in the 1967 book Criminal Behavior Systems: A Typology.

He played a major role in founding the Department of Criminology, Law and Society in the School of Social Ecology at the University of California, Irvine. He also served as president of the Association of Certified Fraud Examiners and the American Society of Criminology. He was a member of the President's Commission on Law Enforcement and Administration of Justice convened by then-President of the United States Lyndon B. Johnson. He was author of over 500 articles and book chapters, as well as twenty-eight books. He was described by Henry Pontell and Paul Jesilow as "one of the most prolific scholars in all of social science".

Professional and academic associations
Preceded by Nicholas N. Kittrie	President of the American Society of Criminology; 1976	Succeeded by William E. Amos
