= James Allen (collector) =

American antique collector (born 1954)

James Allen (born June 16, 1954) is an American antique collector, known in particular for his collection of 145 photographs of lynchings in America, published in 2000 with Congressman John Lewis as Without Sanctuary: Lynching Photography in America. The collection includes images of the lynching in 1911 of Laura and Lawrence Nelson, in Okemah, Oklahoma, and of Leo Frank in 1915 near Marietta, Georgia.

== Background ==
Allen was raised in Winter Park, Florida, within an Irish-Catholic family of 11 brothers and sisters. In an interview for The Los Angeles Times in 2000, Allen said he didn't fit in, and was thrown out of the house at 18 when his father discovered he was gay. He developed a fascination for rare objects from a young age, and when he left home began to make a living as a "picker". Some of his objects are now housed by the Smithsonian and the High Museum of Art in Atlanta. Allen appeared in the third episode of BBC's Racism: A History documentary series where he displays and discusses part of his photograph collection.

== Works ==
- Allen, James and Lewis, Jon. Without Sanctuary: Lynching Photography in America. Twin Palms Publishers, 2000.
