= Martin Hill (camera collector) =

- Born: June 28, 1936
- Died: March 24, 2017 (aged 80)

Martin Hill is a former camera man who collects antique cameras, reels and other various filmmaking equipment. After making a few films, Hill decided to collect cameras instead. At one point he owned the Panavision PSR 35mm that George Lucas used to film the first Star Wars movie, which eventually sold for over $600,000. His collection included cameras that filmed blockbusters such as Gone With the Wind, The Grapes of Wrath, and Butch Cassidy and the Sundance Kid. He also once owned the camera used for most of Charlie Chaplin's silent movies.

== Early life ==
Martin Hill started collecting over fifty years ago. After he got out of the army, he and his wife, Patsy, began dealing in army surplus. One day, he used all of their savings and bought a literal ton of gun parts for $200. He cataloged and sorted all the pieces, over 36,000, and sold them to dealers. He turned a $200 investment in a $4000 one.

Hill and his childhood friend, Harry Joyner, a cinematographer in Charlotte, NC, made amateur 8mm films when they were young. In 1971, they shot a 35mm film called "Body Shop." Hill believes it was the first 35mm film shot and produced in Charlotte. The film may still be found in obscure video stores by the name of "Dr. Gore."

== Collection ==
Hill's camera collection includes a VistaVision camera from The Ten Commandments, among others, most of which have "scrap" stamped on their side. Hill and his family are working with museums and studios to try and raise awareness about preserving the historical artifacts of Hollywood.

Hill calls the cameras "monuments to my folly," his folly being his love of movies and movie making. Over the years, he has collected hundreds of cameras, but sells very few. He says on his death bed, he'll still be buying junk, knowing he won't sell it all.

One of the cameras that was once part of Hill's collection, Mitchell BNC #208, is currently on display at the Academy Museum of Motion Pictures as part of "The Godfather" 50th anniversary exhibit, which will be running from 2022 to 2024. Although it's not the original camera used to film "The Godfather," it closely resembles the camera used in the movie. This is because the camera was modified into a reflexed camera by Camera Services Center in New York, making it similar to the one used during the filming of "The Godfather." In 2006, Hill sold the camera to Nathan Snyder of owyheesound, who then lent it to the Academy Museum in 2022.

== Documentary ==
GreyHawk Films, a Charlotte, North Carolina, film production company, is currently completing a documentary on Martin Hill. Joanne Hock and John Disher, who work for GreyHawk Films, discovered Hill's story on a prop scout and thought it would make a great documentary.

They began a Kickstarter to raise the $6,000 necessary to complete the documentary. They reached their goal on August 21, 2011, with help from the historian Leonard Maltin, who blogged about their documentary. Maltin says, "Would you like to see the brushes Leonardo Da Vinci used to paint the Mona Lisa, or the chisel Rodin employed to carve The Thinker? Think of these cameras in the same way, and you’ll understand why they have artistic as well as historic value." The documentary depicts, among other things, Hill's long-time friend Mark Mervis (a professional cinematographer) cranking up and running film through the "treasure" of his camera collection: a 1920s camera that Charlie Chaplin used to film most of his silent movies. Hill and his family entered the camera at an auction sponsored by Debbie Reynolds.

The documentary has had a few rough cut test screenings, but has not been released yet due to copyright issues.

== Health ==
On July 3, 2012, Hill suffered from a stroke that paralyzed half of his body.

== Death ==
Martin Hill died peacefully on March 24, 2017, at Clear Creek Nursing Home and Rehab.
