= List of lynching victims in the United States =

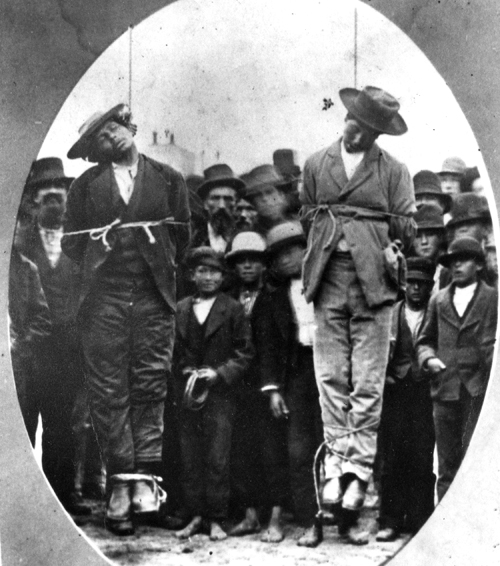
Two Mexican-American men, Francisco Arias and José Chamales, lynched in Santa Cruz, California, in 1877

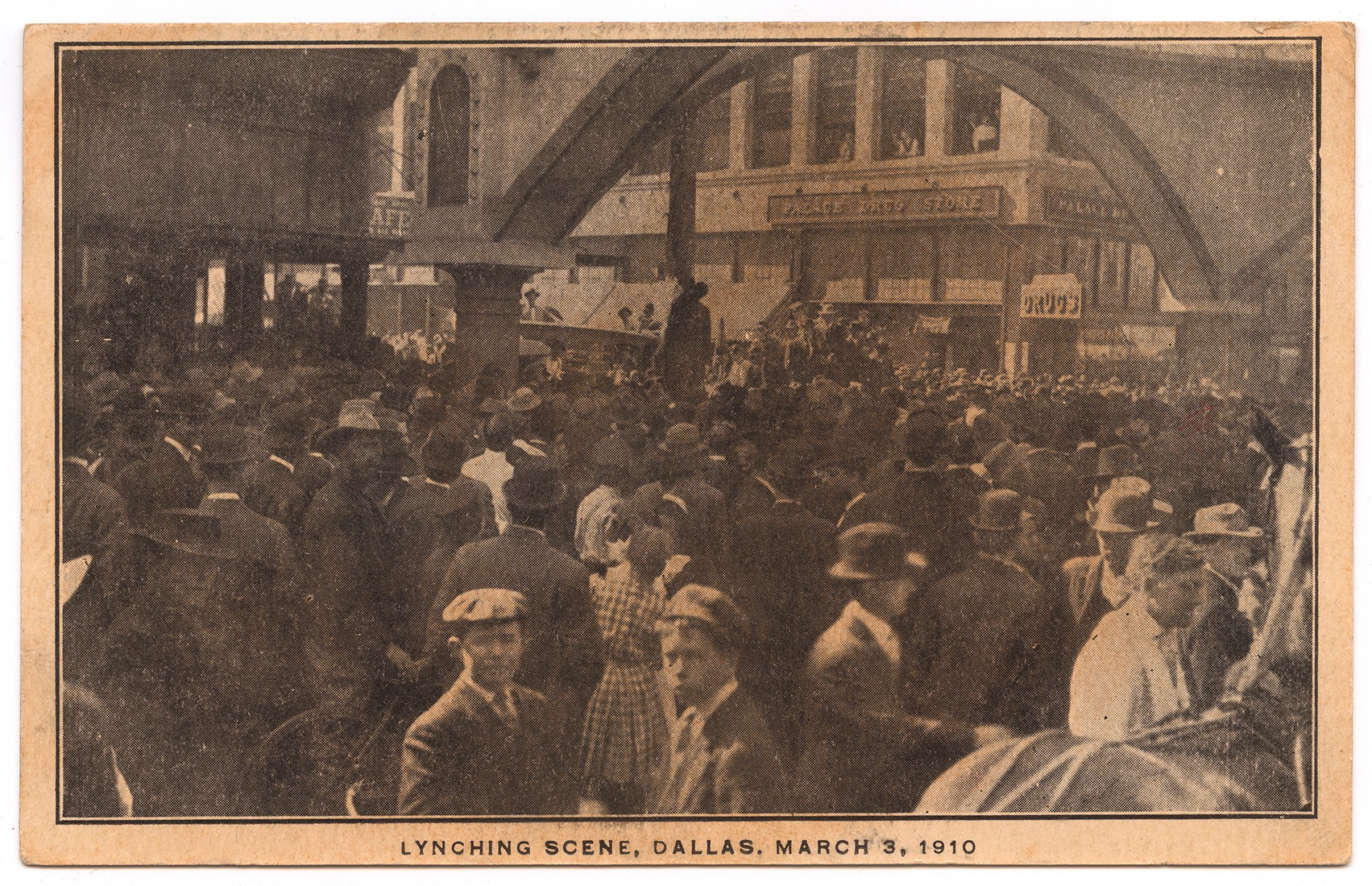
Postcard commemorating the lynching of Allen Brooks in Dallas in 1910

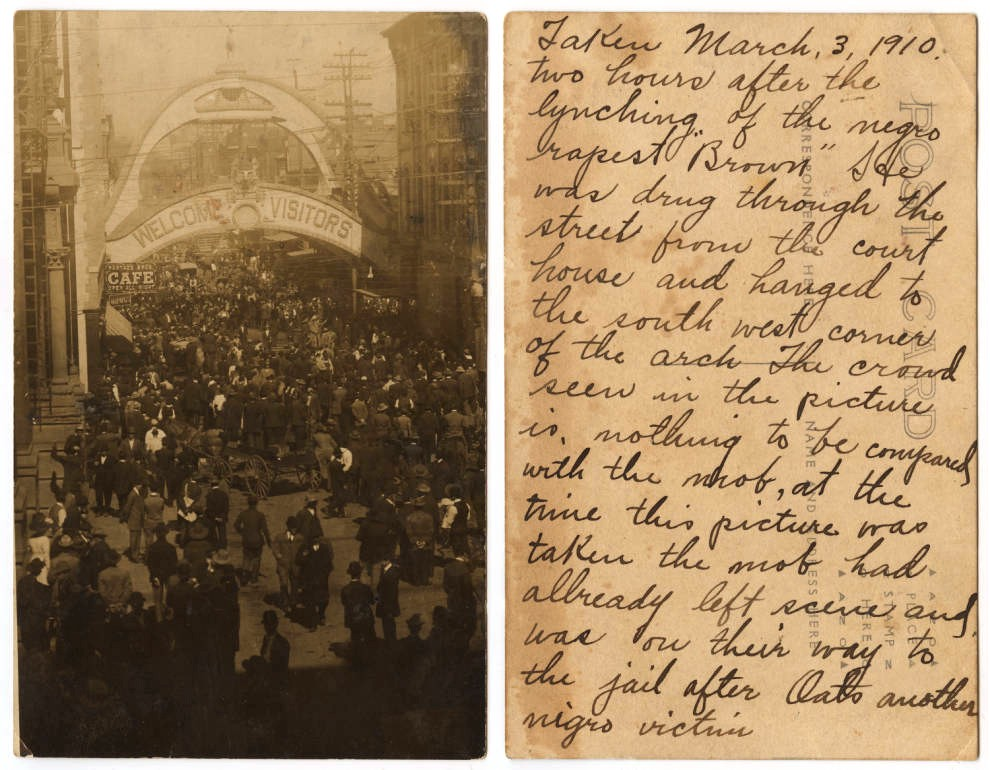
Postcard of crowd two hours after the lynching of Brooks

This is a list of lynching victims in the United States. While the definition has changed over time, lynching is often defined as the summary execution of one or more persons without due process of law by a group of people organized internally and not authorized by a legitimate government. Lynchers may claim to be issuing punishment for an alleged crime; however, they are not a judicial body nor deputized by one. Lynchings in the United States became more frequent after the American Civil War in the late 19th century, following the emancipation of slaves; they became less common in the 1920s.

Nearly 3,500 African Americans and 1,300 white people were lynched in the United States between 1882 and 1968. Most lynchings were of African-American men in the Southern United States, but women were also lynched. More than 73 percent of lynchings in the post–Civil War period occurred in the Southern states. White lynchings of black people also occurred in the Midwestern United States and the Border States, especially during the 20th-century Great Migration of black people out of the Southern United States. According to the United Nations' Working Group of Experts on People of African Descent, the purpose for many of the lynchings was to enforce white supremacy and intimidate black people through racial terrorism.

According to Ida B. Wells and the Tuskegee University, most lynching victims were accused of murder or attempted murder. Rape or attempted rape was the second most common accusation; such accusations were often pretexts for lynching black people who violated Jim Crow etiquette or engaged in economic competition with white people. Sociologist Arthur F. Raper investigated one hundred lynchings during the 1930s and estimated that approximately one-third of the victims were falsely accused.

On a per capita basis, lynchings were also common in California and the Old West, especially of Latinos, although they represented less than 10% of the national total. Native Americans, Asian Americans, Jewish Americans, and Italian-Americans were also lynched. Other ethnicities, including Finnish-Americans and German-Americans were also lynched occasionally. At least six law officers were killed trying to stop lynch mobs, three of whom succeeded at the cost of their own lives, including Deputy Sheriff Samuel Joseph Lewis in 1882, and two law officers in 1915 in South Carolina. Three law officers were themselves hanged by lynch mobs (Henry Plummer in 1864; James Murray in 1897; Carl Etherington in 1910).

== 19th century ==
=== Before 1870 ===
Name	Age	Ethnicity	City	County/Parish	State	Date	Accusation	Comment
Francis McIntosh	26	African American	St. Louis	St. Louis	Missouri	April 28, 1836	Stabbed two white police officers, one of them fatally	Burned alive. Lynching had broad local support. Reported on by abolitionist editor Elijah Lovejoy, who was soon lynched himself.
Elijah Parish Lovejoy	35	White	Alton	Madison	Illinois	November 7, 1837	None (Note: Abolitionist newspaper editor and publisher, Lovejoy was fatally shot during an attack by a mob of pro-slavery partisans.)	Shot upon leaving a warehouse. Had moved to Alton to escape violence in St. Louis. Four successive printing presses destroyed. "Not guilty" verdict; jury foreman member of mob.
Joseph Smith	38	White	Carthage	Hancock	Illinois	June 27, 1844	Latter-Day Saints. Technically, treason against state of Illinois, but lynching was for religious views, especially plural marriage/polygamy.	In jail awaiting trial. Five men were tried and acquitted.
Hyrum Smith	44	White	Carthage	Hancock	Illinois	June 27, 1844	Latter-Day Saints. Technically, treason against state of Illinois, but lynching was for religious views, especially plural marriage/polygamy.	In jail awaiting trial. Five men were tried and acquitted.
John Tucker	about 45	African American	Indianapolis	Marion	Indiana	July 5, 1845	None (Note: Victim of racial terrorism.)	Beaten to death by three men. One of the attackers, Nicholas Wood, was convicted of manslaughter and sentenced to three years in prison at hard labor.
Eli	Unknown	African American	Union	Franklin	Missouri	April 1847	Murder	Hanged
Paunais or Little Saux	22	Native American	St. Croix Valley		Wisconsin	June 1848	Murder of a white man	Hanged
Battle Creek massacre		Native American	Battle Creek	Utah	Utah	March 5, 1849	Alleged cattle theft	Four to seven killed by Mormon settlers; attack ordered by Brigham Young.
Josefa Segovia	about 25	Latin	Downieville	Sierra	California	July 5, 1851	Killing a white man	Hanged
Robert S. Maynard	21	White	Jacksonville	Rogue River	Oregon Territory	May 1852	Killing of J.C. Platt	Lynched by miners who appointed a "committee", via "mob law."
Capistrano Lopez	Adults	Latin	Santa Cruz	Santa Cruz	California	July 20, 1852	Killing and robbing of Americans	Band of Mexican horse thieves and murderers, who "tormented the central coast", frequently boasted of killing and robbing Americans. They were taken by vigilantes out of jail and hanged from a makeshift gallows.
Domingo Hernández	Adults	Latin	Santa Cruz	Santa Cruz	California	July 20, 1852	Killing and robbing of Americans	Band of Mexican horse thieves and murderers, who "tormented the central coast", frequently boasted of killing and robbing Americans. They were taken by vigilantes out of jail and hanged from a makeshift gallows.
Mariano Hernández	Adults	Latin	Santa Cruz	Santa Cruz	California	July 20, 1852	Killing and robbing of Americans	Band of Mexican horse thieves and murderers, who "tormented the central coast", frequently boasted of killing and robbing Americans. They were taken by vigilantes out of jail and hanged from a makeshift gallows.
John Clare		White	Santa Cruz	Santa Cruz	California	August 17, 1853	Murder of Hungarian fisherman Andrew Cracovich	Hanged
Nephi massacre	10–35	Native American	Nephi	Juab	Utah	October 2, 1853	Believed to pose a danger during Wakara's War	7 Native American male children and adults, ages 10–35, were invited into the Mormon settlers' fort when they came seeking peace, but were then executed.
David Thomas	34	African American	Denton	Caroline	Maryland	October 1854	Murder of a white man	
Toll		African American	Benton	Saline	Arkansas	October 23, 1854	Murders of two white men	Taken from jail and hanged from a tree.
Aaron		African American		Washington	Arkansas	July 7, 1856	Murder of a slave owner	Hanged from a tree. A third slave, Randall, was convicted of first degree murder, sentenced to death, and executed by hanging on August 1, 1856.
Anthony		African American		Washington	Arkansas	July 7, 1856	Murder of a slave owner	Hanged from a tree. A third slave, Randall, was convicted of first degree murder, sentenced to death, and executed by hanging on August 1, 1856.
John Aiken	25	White		Juab	Utah Territory	November 1857	Spying	Ordered by Brigham Young shortly after the Mountain Meadows Massacre. Shot by party including Porter Rockwell and Wild Bill Hickman.
Thomas L. Aiken	27	White		Juab	Utah Territory	November 1857	Spying	Ordered by Brigham Young shortly after the Mountain Meadows Massacre. Shot by party including Porter Rockwell and Wild Bill Hickman.
John Achard	33	White		Juab	Utah Territory	November 1857	Spying	Ordered by Brigham Young shortly after the Mountain Meadows Massacre. Shot by party including Porter Rockwell and Wild Bill Hickman.
Andrew Jackson Jones		White		Juab	Utah Territory	November 1857	Spying	Ordered by Brigham Young shortly after the Mountain Meadows Massacre. Shot by party including Porter Rockwell and Wild Bill Hickman.
Horace Bucklin		White		Juab	Utah Territory	November 1857	Spying	Ordered by Brigham Young shortly after the Mountain Meadows Massacre. Shot by party including Porter Rockwell and Wild Bill Hickman.
Bill Saul Thompson		African American	Greensburg	Green	Kentucky	1858	Robbery and murder of a wealthy white farmer, "Mr. Simpson."	Thompson and Despano were two of four men jailed for allegedly murdering a Mr. Simpson. A mob broke into the jail which was abandoned by the jailor. To avoid lynching, one of the four, Elias Scraggs, slit his own throat. Thompson and Despano were taken by the mob and hanged from a tree. After seeing Scraggs, Thompson and Despano die, a fourth man after "a good deal of reluctance" avoided lynching by implicating five others, including Simpson's own son-in-law, though the son-in-law was "generally considered innocent."
Sloan Despano		African American	Greensburg	Green	Kentucky	1858	Robbery and murder of a wealthy white farmer, "Mr. Simpson."	
Pancho Daniel		Latin	Los Angeles	Los Angeles	California	November 30, 1858	Murder of white police officer James R. Barton	Hanged.
Adam		African American	Tampa	Hillsborough	Florida	1859	In response to the murder of a white man, and "in keeping with local custom, a slave man was selected to be killed in retribution".	Adam was tried and convicted of the murder of a white man. He was represented by Ossian Hart, who appealed the conviction. The Florida State Supreme Court declared a mistrial, following which a mob broke into the jail, seized Adam and hanged him.
Jackson, Oscar F.		White	Rockford Township	Wright	Minnesota	April 1858	Alleged murder of land owner Henry A. Wallace	Lynched by a mob of vigilantes in retribution for the killing of Henry A. Wallace and the cause of the Wright County War.
John	23	African American	Marshall	Saline	Missouri	July 19, 1859	Murder	Following the trial of three men at a special session of the Saline County Circuit Court, the men were forcefully removed from law enforcement custody by a mob. The men were led a short distance from the court house where John was tied to a stake. John was questioned by the mob and he accused a white man of being his accomplice. Immediately afterwards, the "combustibles surrounding him was lit on fire by a match". It is documented that John pleaded for mercy from onlookers for six to eight minutes before he died.
Jim	32-35	African American	Marshall	Saline	Missouri	July 19, 1859	Attempted rape of a white woman	Hanged. According to a publication called the History of Saline County Missouri. The mob intended to burn Jim as well. Instead he was hanged from the same branch as Hollman.
Hollman	30	African American	Marshall	Saline	Missouri	July 19, 1859	Assault	Hanged
George Marshall Clarke	23	African American	Milwaukee	Milwaukee	Wisconsin	September 6, 1861	Allegedly exchanged insults and blows with two Irishmen who accused him and a friend of bothering two white women on the street.	Hanged from a pile driver by a crowd of fifty to seventy-five Irishmen.
Jacob Hamilton	28	African American	Smyrna	Kent and New Castle	Delaware	October 11, 1861	Believed to have assaulted a white woman in her home.	While a trial was in progress, preparations to lynch the victim were made outside. When constables walked out with Hamilton, the crowd seized and hanged him.
Jim Wilson		African American	Oakland	Caroline	Maryland	1862	Rape and murder of an eight year old white girl	
Great Hanging at Gainesville (number >16)	Adult men	White	Gainesville	Cooke	Texas	October 1862	Lynching, plus "legal" executions, of Union supporters by Confederate supporters	Many lynched before trial was concluded. Prosecution of perpetrators "half-hearted"; only one convicted.
William L. Hall	Unknown	White	Union	Franklin	Missouri	1861 or 1862	Murder	During preliminary examination to stand trial, William was seized by about 50 men and hanged. Many believe that William may have been considered insane.
Joshua Boyd		African American	Detroit	Wayne	Michigan	March 6, 1863	None: A mob was enraged that a German civilian was killed at the trial of Thomas Faulkner who they considered less worthy so they took it out on blacks, Boyd happened to be in and in one of the buildings they attacked.	Beaten by mob of Irishmen; died four days later.
Robert Mulliner		African American	Newburgh	Orange	New York	June 21, 1863	Rape of a white woman	Hanged from a tree by mob of Irishmen
Henry Plummer	31	White	Bannock	Beaverhead	Montana Territory	January 10, 1864	Leader of an outlaw gang	A sheriff who was dragged from his house and lynched; the only evidence of his alleged crimes was in an account written by a lynch mob member to justify lynching; 130 years later Plummer was posthumously tried; the jury reached a split decision (six to six) and a mistrial was declared.
Clubfoot George		White	Nevada City	Madison	Montana Territory	January 14, 1864	Outlaw	Hanged by the Montana Vigilantes
Daly, John	24-25	White	Aurora	Mineral County	Nevada Territory	February 9, 1864	Murder of W.R. Johnson	Outlaw and leader of the Daly Gang. Lynched alongside three fellow gang members.
Joseph Alfred Slade	33	White	Virginia City	Madison	Montana Territory	March 10, 1864	Disturbing the peace	Hanged by vigilantes
Bill Sketoe	46	White	Newton	Dale	Alabama	December 3, 1864	Disputed: Locally-told stories say that he was hanged on trumped-up charges of desertion from the Confederate Army, other sources show that he was killed for allegedly aiding pro-Union renegades in the area.	Beaten and hanged
John (Jack) Campbell		Mixed race (White/Dakota)	Mankato	Blue Earth, Nicollet, and Le Sueur	Minnesota	1865	Double murder	Lynched by a mob after an extrajudicial "trial".
Jerry Atkins		African American		Union	Arkansas	November 21, 1865	Murders of two white children	Tied to a tree and burned alive.
Circleville Massacre		Native American	Circleville	Piute	Utah	April 21, 1866	Believed to pose a danger during the Black Hawk War	27 Native American children, women, and men were imprisoned and murdered with blunt weapons, knives, and guns by Mormon settlers.
Garrett Thompson		White	Albia	Monroe	Iowa	June 1866	Horse theft	Thompson was arrested by the county sheriff based on evidence collected by a local vigilance committee, then tried in an extrajudicial jury proceeding and hanged.
Pompey O'Bannon		African American		Wilkinson	Georgia	June 29, 1866	Murder of a white woman and attempted murders of her two small children	Tied to a tree, mutilated, and burned alive. O'Bannon and an accomplice, Dennis Harris, were identified by a black girl who escaped the attack. Dennis Harris was convicted of murder, sentenced to death, and executed by hanging on November 2, 1866.
John Taylor	17	African American	Mason	Ingham	Michigan	August 27, 1866	Attempted murder of his employer's wife following a wage dispute	Taylor was a former slave, and had been a teenage soldier for the Union. A mob dragged him from a jail, tortured him and hanged him from a tree, and mutilated and decapitated his body; no one was prosecuted. In 2018, a local park was named the "John Taylor Memorial Park" after him.
Thomas Coleman	34	African American	Salt Lake City	Salt Lake	Utah Territory	December 10, 1866	Walking with a white woman	Coleman, formerly enslaved by White Mormon people, was bludgeoned to death by an unknown number of assailants. His throat was deeply slit and body dumped with a note pinned to his chest stating "Notice to all niggers! Take warning!! Leave white women alone!!!"
James Pippin	unknown	White	Church Hill or Centerville	Queen Anne's	Maryland	June 23, 1867	Tried for killing a merchant, but acquitted	Angry about Pippin's acquittal, a mob of 20 people dragged him from under the floorboards of his father's house and hanged him.
William "Obie" Evans		African American	Leipsic	Kent	Delaware	July 24, 1867	Arson	Hanged from a willow tree.
Henry Hatchell	unknown	White	Franklin	Johnson	Indiana	November 1, 1867	Awaiting trial for murder of David J. Lyons who was killed during a robbery.	A mob of 400 broke into the jail with sledge hammers, took Hatchell and Patterson to a woods about 3/4 of a mile from town and hanged them.
John Patterson	unknown	White	Franklin	Johnson	Indiana	November 1, 1867	Awaiting trial for murder of David J. Lyons who was killed during a robbery.	A mob of 400 broke into the jail with sledge hammers, took Hatchell and Patterson to a woods about 3/4 of a mile from town and hanged them.
Tom McLain	unknown	African American	Coffeeville	Yalobusha	Mississippi	July 1868	Murder of a white overseer	A masked mob broke into the jail cell with sledge hammers, dragged McLain and Quinn from the jail and hanged both from a gum tree with the same rope.
Gilbert Quinn	unknown	African American	Coffeeville	Yalobusha	Mississippi	July 1868	Murder of a white overseer	A masked mob broke into the jail cell with sledge hammers, dragged McLain and Quinn from the jail and hanged both from a gum tree with the same rope.
Theodore Freylinghuysen Clifton	24	White	Hangman Crossing	Jackson	Indiana	July 22, 1868	Being members of the Reno Gang	Hanged from a tree.
Thomas Volney Elliott	22	White	Hangman Crossing	Jackson	Indiana	July 22, 1868	Being members of the Reno Gang	Hanged from a tree.
Charles W. Roseberry	25	White	Hangman Crossing	Jackson	Indiana	July 22, 1868	Being members of the Reno Gang	Hanged from a tree.
Isaac Moore	unknown	African American	Bel Air	Harford	Maryland	July 22, 1868	Robbery of a white woman	Moore was accused of having other "nepharious designs" not carried out after he was frightened away by the screams of the woman from whom he allegedly took money. Moore was before a magistrate when a crowd took him away and hanged him naked from a tree.
Henry Jerrell	23	White	Hangman Crossing	Jackson	Indiana	July 25, 1868	Being members of the Reno Gang	Hanged from a tree.
John J. Moore	21	White	Hangman Crossing	Jackson	Indiana	July 25, 1868	Being members of the Reno Gang	Hanged from a tree.
Frank Sparks	27	White	Hangman Crossing	Jackson	Indiana	July 25, 1868	Being members of the Reno Gang	Hanged from a tree.
Samuel Bierfield		Jewish	Franklin	Williamson	Tennessee	August 15, 1868	None	A group of masked men appeared at both the rear and front doors of Samuel Bierfield's store. When he refused to open the back door, they broke in. He ran out the front, where he encountered the rest of the group. The masked men shot Bierfield five times. They mortally wounded his black clerk Lawrence Bowman, who had been with him at the store. Henry Morton, another black man, had been sitting and chatting with the pair and escaped without injury during the melee. Bierfield pleaded for his life on the street in front of his dry goods store but was shot to death by the masked men at close range.
Lawrence Bowman		African American	Franklin	Williamson	Tennessee	August 15, 1868	None	
Steve Long		White	Laramie	Albany	Wyoming Territory	October 28, 1868	Murder	Hanged from the rafters of an unfinished cabin
Ace Moyer		White	Laramie	Albany	Wyoming Territory	October 28, 1868	Murder	Hanged from the rafters of an unfinished cabin
Con Moyer		White	Laramie	Albany	Wyoming Territory	October 28, 1868	Murder	Hanged from the rafters of an unfinished cabin
Charles Anderson	24	White	New Albany	Floyd	Indiana	December 12, 1868	Being members of the Reno Gang	Taken from jail and hanged from a tree. Frank Reno and Charlie Anderson were technically in federal custody when they were lynched. This is believed to be the only time in U.S. history that a federal prisoner was lynched.
Frank Reno	31	White	New Albany	Floyd	Indiana	December 12, 1868	Being members of the Reno Gang	Taken from jail and hanged from a tree. Frank Reno and Charlie Anderson were technically in federal custody when they were lynched. This is believed to be the only time in U.S. history that a federal prisoner was lynched.
Simeon Reno	25	White	New Albany	Floyd	Indiana	December 12, 1868	Being members of the Reno Gang	Taken from jail and hanged from a tree. Frank Reno and Charlie Anderson were technically in federal custody when they were lynched. This is believed to be the only time in U.S. history that a federal prisoner was lynched.
William Harrison Reno	20	White	New Albany	Floyd	Indiana	December 12, 1868	Being members of the Reno Gang	Taken from jail and hanged from a tree. Frank Reno and Charlie Anderson were technically in federal custody when they were lynched. This is believed to be the only time in U.S. history that a federal prisoner was lynched.
Carlisle	Unknown	Unknown	Cambridge	Saline	Missouri	January 1, 1869	Murder	Carlisle is only described as a "hard character" who shot and killed a German Shoemaker, in a saloon, for refusal to drink. He was arrested and was being transported to Marshall, Missouri when an angry mob took the prisoner from officer's hands and either hanged or drowned him.
William German		White	Livingston	Overton	Tennessee	January 13, 1869	Murder of a black man	Hanged in a barn by the Ku Klux Klan. German, who himself was a Klansman, was targeted since he had committed the murder while wearing his Klan robes, acts both done without prior authorization.
Jim Quinn	unknown	African American	Jarrettsville	Harford	Maryland	October 2, 1869	Assault of a white woman	
Thomas Juricks	about 35	African American	Piscataway	Prince George's	Maryland	October 12, 1869	Assault of a white woman	Sharecropper and father of six, Juricks was "hanged from an oak tree before the mob fired a volley of gunshots into his body".

=== 1870–1879 ===
Name	Age	Ethnicity	City	County/Parish	State	Date	Accusation	Comment
Two Mexicans		Latin	Las Vegas	San Miguel	New Mexico Territory	1870	Stealing groceries	A group of masked men had taken the two Mexicans during the night, hanging them from a beam in the jail yard.
Wyatt Outlaw	49–50	African American	Graham	Alamance	North Carolina	February 26, 1870	None	Sixty-three indictments, but the North Carolina Legislature, to end their cases, repealed the law they were charged with violating.
Offey Johnson		African American	Monroe	Ouachita	Louisiana	March 31, 1870	None (Note: Witness in protective custody, killed while awaiting to testify.)	Johnson was held in protective custody at jail so he could testify against a prisoner in jail named Beavers. Sheriff John H. Wisner killed by mob who then killed prisoner. It is believed Johnson was killed so that he could not testify against Beavers.
Alexander Boyd	35	White	Eutaw	Greene	Alabama	March 31, 1870	None (Note: Targeted for having provided legal representation to African Americans)	Shot by Ku Klux Klan members
J.L. Compton		White	Helena	Lewis and Clark	Montana Territory	April 30, 1870	Murder	A one-thousand-member vigilance committee accused the two men of shooting and robbing an old man named George Lenhart. Their fate was decided on the courthouse steps by mock trial, because "the law was tedious, expensive, and uncertain." When law officers interrupted the proceedings, they were imprisoned by the mob.
Joseph Wilson		White	Helena	Lewis and Clark	Montana Territory	April 30, 1870	Murder	A one-thousand-member vigilance committee accused the two men of shooting and robbing an old man named George Lenhart. Their fate was decided on the courthouse steps by mock trial, because "the law was tedious, expensive, and uncertain." When law officers interrupted the proceedings, they were imprisoned by the mob.
John W. Stephens	35	White	Yancyville	Caswell	North Carolina	May 21, 1870	None (Note: State senator, targeted for having worked to help freedmen)	Ku Klux Klan; no one charged.
Michel Lachenais		White	Los Angeles	Los Angeles	California	December 17, 1870	Murder	Hanged
Jim Williams	40–41	African American		York	South Carolina	March 6, 1871	Leading a black militia organization	Hanged by Ku Klux Klan
Silas Weston	40	African American	Union Mills	Rutherford	North Carolina	April 26, 1871	None (Note: Silas Weston was a witness in a theft case.)	The Ku Klux Klan attacked the family's cabin, shooting and hacking Silas, his two children, and his white stepson to death. They also attempted to murder Silas's white wife, Polly Weston, and their 2-year-old daughter Susan, whose throat they slit. Afterwards they set the home on fire. Govan Adair, Columbus Adair, and Martin Baynard, were convicted of first degree murder and sentenced to death. The Adair brothers were executed by hanging on July 12, 1872. Baynard received a stay of execution after making a full confession, in which he expressed remorse and implicated Henderson, Crayton, and Avery Adair in the murders. Baynard escaped from prison on the day of his scheduled execution on October 18, 1872, with the help of his wife, who swapped clothes with him. The other Adairs were arrested, but murder charges against them were dropped due to insufficient evidence in 1873.
David Weston	8	Biracial (African American/White)	Union Mills	Rutherford	North Carolina	April 26, 1871	None	
Theodosia Weston	6	Biracial (African American/White)	Union Mills	Rutherford	North Carolina	April 26, 1871	None	
William Herbert Steadman	11	White	Union Mills	Rutherford	North Carolina	April 26, 1871	None	
Ah Wing and at least 15 others		Chinese	Los Angeles	Los Angeles	California	October 24, 1871	None	Group of Chinese immigrants killed in retaliation for the accidental homicide of a white rancher. See: Chinese massacre of 1871
George Johnson	Adult	African American	Charlestown	Clark	Indiana	November 17, 1871	Murder of a white family	Indiana Legislature exonerated Johnson, Taylor, and Davis in 2022.
Squire Taylor	64–65	African American	Charlestown	Clark	Indiana	November 17, 1871	Murder of a white family	Indiana Legislature exonerated Johnson, Taylor, and Davis in 2022.
Charles Davis	>60	African American	Charlestown	Clark	Indiana	November 17, 1871	Murder of a white family	Indiana Legislature exonerated Johnson, Taylor, and Davis in 2022.
David Jones		African American	Nashville	Davidson	Tennessee	March 25, 1872	Murder of a white man	Taken from his prison cell and hanged in the public square.
José Castro	35	Latin	San Juan Bautista	San Benito	California	April 1872	Alleged conspiracy to rob a stage coach.	After Tiburcio Vásquez robbed a stage on the San Benito Road, a group of vigilantes seized José Castro, a local saloon owner, and hanged him from a tree based on the flimsy suspicion that he was associated with the bandit.
Charles G. Kelsey	37–38	White	Huntington	Suffolk	New York	November 4, 1872	Sexual indecency	Died from castration after being tarred and feathered by a mob
James McCrory	35–36	White	Visalia	Tulare	California	December 24, 1872	Murder	A group of vigilantes broke into the jail, seized McCrory and hanged him from a bridge.
John W. St. Clair		White	Bozeman	Gallatin	Montana Territory	February 1, 1873	Murder	Both men hanged
Z.A. Triplett		White	Bozeman	Gallatin	Montana Territory	February 1, 1873	Murder	Both men hanged
James Cullen	27/28	Irish	Mapleton	Aroostook	Maine	April 30, 1873	Double axe murder	Hanged
Jeff Davis		Swiss	Ragersville	Tuscarawas	Ohio	July 26, 1873	Attempted rape	Beaten, shot and hanged
Giovanni Chiesa	20	Italian	Churchill	Trumbull	Ohio	July 27, 1873	None	Giovanni Chiesa, the first Italian immigrant lynched in the United States, was clubbed to death by a mob of coal miners.
Eli		African American		Alachua	Florida	May 1874	Assaulting a white woman	Killed when jail burned down by mob; according to a member of mob participant John Wesley Hardin, the local coroner (also allegedly part of the mob) rendered a verdict that Eli had died after setting fire to the jail himself.
Juan Moya	about 68	Mixed race (Tejano)		Goliad	Texas	June 8, 1874	Murder of the Swift family	Juan Moya and his two sons taken from jail and lynched by a mob
Antonio Moya		Mixed race (Tejano)		Goliad	Texas	June 8, 1874	Murder of the Swift family	Juan Moya and his two sons taken from jail and lynched by a mob
Marcello Moya		Mixed race (Tejano)		Goliad	Texas	June 8, 1874	Murder of the Swift family	Juan Moya and his two sons taken from jail and lynched by a mob
Rufus P. "Scrap" Taylor		White	Clinton	DeWitt	Texas	June 22, 1874	Members of the Sutton faction lynched the three men in revenge for murder of Sutton leader William E. Sutton in Indianola, Texas on March 22, 1874.	Three men were members of the Taylor faction in the Sutton-Taylor feud.
John Alfred "Kute" Tuggle		White	Clinton	DeWitt	Texas	June 22, 1874	Members of the Sutton faction lynched the three men in revenge for murder of Sutton leader William E. Sutton in Indianola, Texas on March 22, 1874.	Three men were members of the Taylor faction in the Sutton-Taylor feud.
James White		White	Clinton	DeWitt	Texas	June 22, 1874	Members of the Sutton faction lynched the three men in revenge for murder of Sutton leader William E. Sutton in Indianola, Texas on March 22, 1874.	Three men were members of the Taylor faction in the Sutton-Taylor feud.
Charles Howard Nelson		African American	Des Moines	Polk	Iowa	December 15, 1874	Murder of John Johnson	Taken from his jail cell by a mob with "blackened faces" and hanged from a lamp post at the courthouse square.
Jo Reed		African American	Nashville	Davidson	Tennessee	April 30, 1875	Killing a police officer	Taken out of his jail cell by an unmasked mob and hanged on a suspension bridge. Reed survived and escaped West.
John Simms		African American	Annapolis	Anne Arundel	Maryland	June 1875	Alleged assault of Adaline Jackson.	Simms was shackled and in jail when a mob searched the jailor for his keys and took Simms away, irons and all, and hanged him from a tree. "Many of the lynchers were painted black and some were masked.".
William Keemer	23	African American	Greenfield	Hancock	Indiana	June 25, 1875	Accused of sexually assaulting a white woman	Hanged from a structure at the Hancock County fairground
John Randolph		African American	Osceola	Mississippi	Arkansas	July 22, 1875	Robbery and murder of Frank Williams	Lynched after allegedly confessing to murder of white man. Shot
James G. Patterson		African American		Yazoo	Mississippi	October 20, 1875	Hiring a man to commit murder	Hanged
Benjamin French		African American	Warsaw	Gallatin	Kentucky	May 3, 1876	Murder of Lake Jones, an elderly African American man	Broken out of jail by a white mob and hanged from a tree.
Mollie French		African American	Warsaw	Gallatin	Kentucky	May 3, 1876	Murder of Lake Jones, an elderly African American man	Broken out of jail by a white mob and hanged from a tree.
William Chisolm	46	White		Kemper	Mississippi	April 29, 1877	Murder of Democratic sheriff John Gully	A freedman, Walter Riley, later confessed to murdering Gully and was executed for the murder on December 7, 1877. On the gallows, he indirectly implicated Judge Chisolm in the murder.
Cornelia Chisolm	19	White		Kemper	Mississippi	April 29, 1877	Murder of Democratic sheriff John Gully	A freedman, Walter Riley, later confessed to murdering Gully and was executed for the murder on December 7, 1877. On the gallows, he indirectly implicated Judge Chisolm in the murder.
John Chisolm	14	White		Kemper	Mississippi	April 29, 1877	Murder of Democratic sheriff John Gully	A freedman, Walter Riley, later confessed to murdering Gully and was executed for the murder on December 7, 1877. On the gallows, he indirectly implicated Judge Chisolm in the murder.
John Gilmer Sr.	33	White		Kemper	Mississippi	April 29, 1877	Murder of Democratic sheriff John Gully	A freedman, Walter Riley, later confessed to murdering Gully and was executed for the murder on December 7, 1877. On the gallows, he indirectly implicated Judge Chisolm in the murder.
Angus McLellan		White		Kemper	Mississippi	April 29, 1877	Murder of Democratic sheriff John Gully	A freedman, Walter Riley, later confessed to murdering Gully and was executed for the murder on December 7, 1877. On the gallows, he indirectly implicated Judge Chisolm in the murder.
Francisco Arias		Latin	Santa Cruz	Santa Cruz	California	May 2, 1877	Murder of a man named Henry De Forrest	Broken out of jail by a mob and hanged from a tree.
José Chamales		Latin	Santa Cruz	Santa Cruz	California	May 2, 1877	Murder of a man named Henry De Forrest	Broken out of jail by a mob and hanged from a tree.
Arthur W. St. Clair	about 40	African American		Hernando	Florida	June 26, 1877	None (Note: Targeted for having presided over an interracial marriage)	Shot
Justin Arajo		Latin	San Juan Bautista	San Benito	California	July 1877	Shooting a man named Manuel Butron	Broken out of jail by a disguised mob and hanged from a willow tree.
Simeon Garnet		African American	Oxford	Butler	Ohio	September 1877	Rape of a white woman	Taken from jail and shot
Andrew Richards		African American	Winchester	Scott	Illinois	September 11, 1877	Rape of a white woman	Hanged
Charlotte Harris		African American	near Harrisonburg	Rockingham	Virginia	March 6, 1878	Arson	Hanged from a tree
Christian Mutschler		White	Germantown	Glenn	California	May 5, 1878	Arson	Shot
Frank Pearson		White	Mitchellville	Sumner	Tennessee	June 1878	Rape of a white woman	Hanged.
Frank Sadler		White	Mitchellville	Sumner	Tennessee	June 1878	Rape of a white woman	Hanged.
Michael Green		African American	Upper Marlboro	Prince George's	Maryland	September 1, 1878	Assault of a white woman	Taken from jail and hanged from a tree.
Seven men		African American	Mount Vernon	Posey	Indiana	October 11, 1878	Robbery and rape of three white sex workers	Largest recorded lynching in Indiana. No one was ever indicted.
Ami "Whit" Ketchum		White	Calloway	Custer	Nebraska	December 10, 1878	Livestock theft and murder of a posse member	Taken from the custody of the county sheriff and burned alive.
Luther H. Mitchell		White	Calloway	Custer	Nebraska	December 10, 1878	Livestock theft and murder of a posse member	Taken from the custody of the county sheriff and burned alive.
Mart Horrell	31–32	White	Meridian	Bosque	Texas	December 15, 1878	Armed robbery and murder	Two of the five Horrell Brothers, outlaw brothers best known for their involvement in the Horrell–Higgins feud. While awaiting trial for robbery and murder in Texas, they were shot to death by a mob of armed vigilantes who stormed the jail.
Thomas L. Horrell	29–30	White	Meridian	Bosque	Texas	December 15, 1878	Armed robbery and murder	Two of the five Horrell Brothers, outlaw brothers best known for their involvement in the Horrell–Higgins feud. While awaiting trial for robbery and murder in Texas, they were shot to death by a mob of armed vigilantes who stormed the jail.
Albert Easley	13–14	African American	Jacksonville	Calhoun	Alabama	January 20, 1879	Alleged assault and rape of a white woman	Accused of assaulting and raping Mrs. Moses Ables, Easley was taken by force from the jail and lynched during the day within the city limits of Jacksonville.
Gilmer, Bill		African American	Memphis	Shelby	Tennessee	March–April 1879	Shot attorney Thomas J. Wood	Shot. Gilmer was accused of shooting Wood, who had whipped Gilmer for using offensive language near his wife.
Porter, Nevlin		African American	Starkville	Oktibbeha	Mississippi	May 5, 1879	Arson	
Spencer, Johnson		African American	Starkville	Oktibbeha	Mississippi	May 5, 1879	Arson	
Standing, Joseph	24	White	Varnell Station	Whitfield	Georgia	July 21, 1879	Being Mormon missionaries	Accosted by armed mob. Standing shot, Clawson survived.
Clawson, Rudger	22	White	Varnell Station	Whitfield	Georgia	July 21, 1879	Being Mormon missionaries	Accosted by armed mob. Standing shot, Clawson survived.
Frost, Elijah	29	White	Willits	Mendocino	California	September 4, 1879	Theft of a saddle and harness	Local petty thieves accused without evidence of stealing a saddle and harness. Kidnapped from jail and hanged by 30 members of the local Masonic Temple.
Gibson, Abijah		White	Willits	Mendocino	California	September 4, 1879	Theft of a saddle and harness	Local petty thieves accused without evidence of stealing a saddle and harness. Kidnapped from jail and hanged by 30 members of the local Masonic Temple.
McCracken, Tom		White	Willits	Mendocino	California	September 4, 1879	Theft of a saddle and harness	Local petty thieves accused without evidence of stealing a saddle and harness. Kidnapped from jail and hanged by 30 members of the local Masonic Temple.

=== 1880–1889 ===
Name	Age	Ethnicity	City	County/Parish	State	Date	Accusation	Comment
House, T.J.		White	Las Vegas	San Miguel	New Mexico Territory	1880	Murder of Marshal Joe Carson	Accused of murdering a U.S. Marshal during the Variety Hall shootout. Hanged by a mob.
West, James		White	Las Vegas	San Miguel	New Mexico Territory	1880	Murder of Marshal Joe Carson	Accused of murdering a U.S. Marshal during the Variety Hall shootout. Hanged by a mob.
Dorsey, John		White	Las Vegas	San Miguel	New Mexico Territory	1880	Murder of Marshal Joe Carson	Accused of murdering a U.S. Marshal during the Variety Hall shootout. Hanged by a mob.
Peck, George Washington	22	African American	Poolesville	Montgomery	Maryland	January 10, 1880	Accused of assaulting a white girl	Taken by a mob and hanged from a tree before he could be transported to Rockville for a trial.
Smith, Nat		African American	Jonesboro	Clayton	Georgia	January 15, 1880	Attempted rape of a white woman	Taken from jail by a mob and hanged then shot in the chest.
Jordan, Arthur	24–25	African American	Warrenton	Fauquier	Virginia	January 19, 1880	Eloping with his employer's daughter	Hanged
Ramírez, Refugio		Latin		Collin	Texas	May 1, 1880	Witchcraft	All three were burned to death.
Garcia, Silvestre (wife)		Latin		Collin	Texas	May 1, 1880	Witchcraft	All three were burned to death.
Ines, María (daughter)	16–17	Latin		Collin	Texas	May 1, 1880	Witchcraft	All three were burned to death.
Diggs-Dorsey, John	23	African American	Rockville	Montgomery	Maryland	July 27, 1880	Rape of a white woman	Marched one mile in shackles and hanged from a cherry tree.
Scott, George		African American	Brazil	Clay	Indiana	December 12, 1880	Rape of a white woman	Taken from jail cell and hanged from an oak tree.
Parrott, George	47	White	Rawlins	Carbon	Wyoming Territory	March 22, 1881	Fractured his jailor's skull during an escape attempt while awaiting execution for a double murder	Hanged from a telegraph pole.
Three men		African American		Sevier	Arkansas	May 1881	Attacking a man who requested their help in crossing Rolling Fork Creek	Hanged from a tree on the bank of the creek
Shorter, Josh		African American	Eufaula	Barbour	Alabama	June 8, 1881	Harassing a 12-year-old white girl	Hanged from a tree
Pierce, Charles		White	Bloomington	McLean	Illinois	October 1, 1881	Horse theft and murder	Hanged from a tree
Three Mexicans		Latin	Los Lunas	Valencia	New Mexico Territory	October 7, 1881	Murder of a white man	A mob took the three Mexicans and hanged them from a tree
Davis, Christopher	24	African American	Athens	Athens	Ohio	November 21, 1881	Rape of a white woman	Hanged from a bridge
Johnson, Jim		African American	Pine Bluff	Jefferson	Arkansas	December 24, 1881	Threatening several men with a shotgun.	After being hit on the head with a pistol by Thomas Barksdell, Johnson retaliated by threatening several people with a shotgun and allegedly preventing a doctor from reaching a woman who was in labor.
Harrington, Levi	23	African American	Kansas City	Jackson	Missouri	April 3, 1882	Murder of a white police officer	Newspapers reported he was innocent, but no one was held accountable for the lynching.
McManus, Frank	25	White	Minneapolis	Hennepin	Minnesota	April 19, 1882	Rape of a four-year-old white girl	Taken from jail and hanged from a tree.
Ellis, George	40	White	Ashland	Boyd	Kentucky	June 3, 1882	Murder of three teenagers, including two girls who were raped	Taken from jail and hanged from a sycamore tree after receiving a life sentence. Ellis's two accomplices in the murders, William Neal and Ellis Craft, were both convicted of murder, sentenced to death, and executed by hanging in 1883 and 1885, respectively.
Mentzel, Augustus			Raton	Colfax	New Mexico Territory	June 27, 1882	Resisting arrest; killing three citizens and wounding two	Deputy Sheriff William A Bergin was either mortally wounded by suspect or was killed by mob who then killed prisoner
Tafoya, Francisco "Navajo Frank"		Native American	Deming	Luna	New Mexico Territory	June 29, 1882	Lassoing and dragging a citizen	Taken from jail and lynched on telephone pole in railyard.
Agirer, Augustin		Latin	Austin	Travis	Texas	August 1882	Filing a complaint against a white man	Mr. Agirer had filed a complaint after one of the Anglo men had shot at his dog. In retaliation, the Anglos tracked Mr. Agirer down and fatally shot him in front of his wife.
Harvard, James Quinn	18	White	Eastman	Dodge	Georgia	August 6, 1882	Mistaken identity (thought to be a police officer who murdered a black man)	Roughly 3,000 black people had gathered in town for a meeting when another black man named Jake Tarrapy stole a watch from one of them. Two police officers, Pete Harrell and J.A. Buchan, arrived and arrested Tarrapy. However, Harrell shot and killed him when he broke free and tried to run away. A mob of hundreds of people, nearly all of whom were drunk, flew into a rage and attempted to lynch the police officers, who fled. The mob encountered Buchan, who said he didn't do it and blamed it on Harvard. The mob chased Harvard inside a house, dragged him out from under a bed, and knocked a black man unconscious when he tried to protect Harvard, whom they then beat and shot to death. Three members of the mob were shot and killed and a fourth murdered his wife during the chaos. Twenty-three members of the lynch mob were convicted of murder, of whom 16 received life sentences. Ella Moore, who incited the lynching by saying that Harvard had killed her niece, and five other ringleaders, 60-year-old Simon O'Quinn, Robert Donaldson, 26-year-old Joseph King, 25-year-old Reddick Powell, and Ike Shipman, were sentenced to death. Shipman's sentence was commuted to life in prison, while the other five were executed by hanging on October 20, 1882.
Thurber, Charles		African American	Grand Forks	Grand Forks	Dakota Territory	October 24, 1882	Assault and rape of two white women	Taken from law officers in jail and hanged from a bridge.
Green, James		White	Hastings	Adams	Nebraska	April 3, 1883	Robbery and murder of a shopkeeper	Accused of the robbery and murder of Cassius Millet, a mob forcibly took the pair from the jail and hanged them from a bridge.
Ingraham, Fred		White	Hastings	Adams	Nebraska	April 3, 1883	Robbery and murder of a shopkeeper	Accused of the robbery and murder of Cassius Millet, a mob forcibly took the pair from the jail and hanged them from a bridge.
García, Encarnción	30–31	Latin	Los Gatos	Santa Clara	California	June 17, 1883	Murder	Encarnación García was a nephew of the bandido Tiburcio Vásquez. He was arrested for stabbing another man to death following a card game at the Los Gatos Saloon. A mob broke into the jail, seized García and hanged him from the Los Gatos Creek bridge.
Green, Charley		Native American	Juneau	Juneau	Alaska Territory	July/August 1883	Murder of rumseller Richard Rainey	Hanged
Boxer		Native American	Juneau	Juneau	Alaska Territory	July/August 1883	Murder of rumseller Richard Rainey	Hanged
Harvey, William "Sam Joe"	35	Black	Salt Lake City	Salt Lake	Utah Territory	August 25, 1883	Murder of white police chief	After police severely kicked and beat him they handed him over to a White mob of up to 2,000 people who hanged Harvey in front of the city jail then dragged his body down the main city street.
Conorly, Huie	16	African American	Bogalusa	Washington	Louisiana	February 18, 1884	Attempted rape of a white woman	A mob of 10 to 15 men broke into the jail, seized Conorly and hanged him on the jail steps.
Heath, John	28	White	Tombstone	Cochise	Arizona Territory	February 22, 1884	Role in Bisbee massacre	Hanged from a tree by a mob unsatisfied by the life sentence for Heath
Lucas, William Joseph	49	White	Owensboro	Daviess	Kentucky	July 14, 1884	Attempting to prevent the lynching of Richard May	Lucas, the jailor, was shot and killed, after which May was taken from the jail and hanged from a tree. Two members of the lynch mob were shot and killed by Lucas and his 16-year-old son.
May, Richard	23	African American	Owensboro	Daviess	Kentucky	July 14, 1884	Attempted rape of a 17-year-old white girl	Lucas, the jailor, was shot and killed, after which May was taken from the jail and hanged from a tree. Two members of the lynch mob were shot and killed by Lucas and his 16-year-old son.
Briscoe, George	40	African American	On a rural road (Note: Briscoe was seized at the New Bridge over the Magothy River while being transported from Jacobsville to Annapolis, and was hanged beside the road. The place was said to be "very lonely and far from any habitation.")	Anne Arundel	Maryland	November 26, 1884	Robbery of the residence of George Schievenent.	"[A]sked the magistrate with an oath what right he had to commit him to jail?" angering the crowd. Hanged by "a large party" of masked men.
Cook, Townsend	21	African American	Westminster	Carroll	Maryland	June 2, 1885	Rape of a white woman	
Jackson, Andy		African American	Elkhart	Anderson	Texas	June 21, 1885	Gang rape and murder of a white woman	Lizzie Jackson implicated the four men in the gang rape and murder of 23-year-old Mattie Hassell. All five were taken from jail and hanged from a tree.
Jackson, Lizzie (Andy's wife)		African American	Elkhart	Anderson	Texas	June 21, 1885	Gang rape and murder of a white woman	Lizzie Jackson implicated the four men in the gang rape and murder of 23-year-old Mattie Hassell. All five were taken from jail and hanged from a tree.
Hayes, Frank		African American	Elkhart	Anderson	Texas	June 21, 1885	Gang rape and murder of a white woman	Lizzie Jackson implicated the four men in the gang rape and murder of 23-year-old Mattie Hassell. All five were taken from jail and hanged from a tree.
Norman, Joe		African American	Elkhart	Anderson	Texas	June 21, 1885	Gang rape and murder of a white woman	Lizzie Jackson implicated the four men in the gang rape and murder of 23-year-old Mattie Hassell. All five were taken from jail and hanged from a tree.
Rogers, Willie		African American	Elkhart	Anderson	Texas	June 21, 1885	Gang rape and murder of a white woman	Lizzie Jackson implicated the four men in the gang rape and murder of 23-year-old Mattie Hassell. All five were taken from jail and hanged from a tree.
McChristian, Perry		White	Grenada	Grenada	Mississippi	July 7, 1885	Murder of two peddlers	
Williams, Felix		White	Grenada	Grenada	Mississippi	July 7, 1885	Murder of two peddlers	
James, Bartley		African American	Grenada	Grenada	Mississippi	July 7, 1885	Murder of two peddlers	
Campbell, John		African American	Grenada	Grenada	Mississippi	July 7, 1885	Murder of two peddlers	
Cooper, Howard	15	African American	Towson	Baltimore	Maryland	July 12, 1885	Rape of a 16-year-old white girl	Convicted of assault and rape after one minute deliberation and sentenced to death, his attorneys intended to file an appeal; 75 masked men broke Cooper out of jail and hanged him from a tree.
Scruggs, David		African American	Redfield	Jefferson	Arkansas	July 23/24, 1885	Rape of his 11-year-old daughter	Tortured and carved up with knives by African American mob after being released from jail, later died from blood loss.
Lee Kee Nam		Asian	Pierce City	Shoshone	Idaho Territory	September 18, 1885	Murder	1885 Pierce City lynching: Killed along with four other Chinese individuals following the killing of a White storekeeper.
Finch, Jerry	46	African American		Chatham	North Carolina	September 29, 1885	Murders of two white families	Taken from jail and hanged
Finch, Harriet	30	African American		Chatham	North Carolina	September 29, 1885	Murders of two white families	Taken from jail and hanged
Tyson, Lee		African American		Chatham	North Carolina	September 29, 1885	Murders of two white families	Taken from jail and hanged
Pattishall, John		African American		Chatham	North Carolina	September 29, 1885	Murders of two white families	Taken from jail and hanged
Johnson, Samuel "Mingo Jack"	66	African American	Eatontown	Monmouth	New Jersey	March 5, 1886	Rape of a white woman	Take from jail and hanged.
Villarosa, Federico (Francesco Valoto)		Italian	Vicksburg	Warren	Mississippi	March 25, 1886	Attempted rape of a 10-year-old white girl	Hanged from a tree by a mob despite the efforts of the sheriff and state militia.
Whitley, Charles	18	African American	Prince Frederick	Calvert	Maryland	June 6, 1886	Rape of a 5-year-old white girl	A mob of 35–40 heavily armed men broke into the jail, seized Whitley and hanged him from a tree about a mile and a half away.
Lockwood, Charles	35	White	Morris	Litchfield	Connecticut	July 25, 1886	Murder of a 16-year-old white girl	Found hanged from a tree three days later. Public opinion divided on whether Lockwood committed suicide or was lynched. Coroner's jury returned a verdict of suicide.
Woods, Eliza		African American	Jackson	Madison	Tennessee	August 19, 1886	Poisoning of her employer	Taken from the county jail, stripped naked, hanged in the courthouse yard and her body riddled with bullets and left exposed to view.
Three men		African American	McNutt	Leflore County	Mississippi	August 30, 1886	Attempted rape of several white woman	Hanged.
Johnson, David	50	White	Westernport	Allegany	Maryland	September 14, 1886	Alleged murder of Edward White.	Hanged by a mob. Newspaper accounts describe Johnson as troubled with "religious mania" and regarded as insane.
Betters, Peter	35	African American	Greene County	Jamestown	Ohio	June 12, 1887	Alleged assault on Martha Thomas	Assault victim Martha Thomas was mixed race and the mob was reportedly led by members of the black community.
McCutchen, Frank		Latin	Oakdale	Stanislaus	California	November 26, 1887	Arson	Fires had been appearing around Oakdale and McCutchen had allegedly been caught in the act of setting fire to a barn. McCutchen was arrested and while being transferred to Modesto jail, a mob overpowered the constable and hanged McCutchen from a tree.
Waldrop, Manse	35	White		Pickens	South Carolina	December 30, 1887	Rape and murder of a 14-year-old black girl	Shot and hanged by an African American mob. Two black men were convicted of murder and sentenced to death, but they were pardoned by the governor.
Kelly Family (Bill, Kate, Kit, and William Kelly)		White	Wheeler	Wheeler County	Texas	January 4, 1888	Murders of 11 people	A family of serial killers responsible for the murders of eleven travellers in the Oklahoma Panhandle. They tried to flee to New Mexico after their crimes were discovered, but vigilantes caught up to them in southern Texas and summarily hanged them.
Salazar, Santos		Latin	South Texas	Jim Wells	Texas	January 23, 1888	Murder of a white man	Jake Stafford was found dead two miles away from the road he was on; one of the main suspects of murdering Mr. Stafford was Mexican-American Salazar Santos. When the news spread across the city, a mob hanged Salazar due to the suspicion of him being the murderer.
Grandstaff, Andrew	22–23	White	Viroqua	Vernon	Wisconsin	June 1, 1888	Murders of two adults and two children	Taken from the county jail and hanged from a tree on courthouse lawn.
Miller, Amos	23	African American	Franklin	Williamson	Tennessee	August 10, 1888	Assaulting a white woman	Taken from the courthouse during his trial and lynched on the balcony railings.
Witherell, George	42	White	Cañon City	Fremont	Colorado	December 4, 1888	Murder of L.K. Wall	Hanged from a telephone pole. Witherell was a serial killer responsible for a total of six murders.
Meadows, George		African American	N/A	Jefferson	Alabama	January 15, 1889	Rape and attempted murder of a white woman, murder of her 10-year-old son; rape of a black girl	Lynched despite calls from his accuser that she could not confirm he was guilty. However, the accuser later confessed that she never had any doubt that Meadows, had attacked her, but had intentionally feigned doubts over his guilt in an attempt to deter his lynching.
Fletcher, Magruder	about 35	African American	Tasley	Accomack	Virginia	March 14, 1889	Rape of a white woman in her home	
Martin, Albert	23	African American	Port Huron	St. Clair	Michigan	May 27, 1889	Assault and rape	A mob broke into his jail cell with sledge hammers, dragged him from the jail with a noose around his neck, beat and shot him to death, then hanged his corpse from a bridge.
Watson, Ellen	28	White		Natrona	Wyoming Territory	July 20, 1889	Stealing cattle	Abducted and hanged
Averell, James	38	White		Natrona	Wyoming Territory	July 20, 1889	Stealing cattle	Abducted and hanged
Bowen, Keith		African American	Aberdeen	Monroe	Mississippi	August 14, 1889	Found with white girl	Hanged
Bush, George	17	African American	Columbia	Boone	Missouri	September 7, 1889	Rape of a five-year-old white girl	Taken from jail, hanged from a tree.
Goto, Katsu	28	Japanese	Honokaʻa	Hawaii	Hawaii (Kingdom)	October 28, 1889	Arson	Hanged from a telephone pole. Six people were charged for the lynching. Charges were dropped against two for their cooperation with authorities. Joseph Mills and Thomas Steele were convicted of second degree manslaughter and sentenced to 9 years in prison and Walter Blabon and William Watson were convicted of third degree manslaughter and each sentenced to four years in prison. Steele and Blabon escaped from prison, Watson served out his time, and J. R. Mills was pardoned in 1894.
Anderson, Orion	14	African American	Leesburg	Loudoun	Virginia	November 8, 1889	"Scaring a teenaged white girl"	Hanged from a derrick
Vermillion, Joseph	27	White	Upper Marlboro	Prince George	Maryland	December 3, 1889	Arson	Hanged from a bridge

=== 1890–1899 ===
Name	Age	Ethnicity	City	County/Parish	State	Date	Accusation	Comment
Johnson, Ripley		African American	Barnwell vicinity	Barnwell	South Carolina	December 28, 1889	Alleged murder of a merchant and another person. Some were only being held as witnesses.	A mob of about 100 took the men from the jail to the outskirts of Barnwell and shot them.
Adams, Mitchell		African American	Barnwell vicinity	Barnwell	South Carolina	December 28, 1889	Alleged murder of a merchant and another person. Some were only being held as witnesses.	A mob of about 100 took the men from the jail to the outskirts of Barnwell and shot them.
Jones, Judge	about 22	African American	Barnwell vicinity	Barnwell	South Carolina	December 28, 1889	Alleged murder of a merchant and another person. Some were only being held as witnesses.	A mob of about 100 took the men from the jail to the outskirts of Barnwell and shot them.
Phoenix, Robert	about 30	African American	Barnwell vicinity	Barnwell	South Carolina	December 28, 1889	Alleged murder of a merchant and another person. Some were only being held as witnesses.	A mob of about 100 took the men from the jail to the outskirts of Barnwell and shot them.
Furz, Hugh	about 24	African American	Barnwell vicinity	Barnwell	South Carolina	December 28, 1889	Alleged murder of a merchant and another person. Some were only being held as witnesses.	A mob of about 100 took the men from the jail to the outskirts of Barnwell and shot them.
Johnson, Harrison	about 35	African American	Barnwell vicinity	Barnwell	South Carolina	December 28, 1889	Alleged murder of a merchant and another person. Some were only being held as witnesses.	A mob of about 100 took the men from the jail to the outskirts of Barnwell and shot them.
Bell, Peter	about 60	African American	Barnwell vicinity	Barnwell	South Carolina	December 28, 1889	Alleged murder of a merchant and another person. Some were only being held as witnesses.	A mob of about 100 took the men from the jail to the outskirts of Barnwell and shot them.
Morral, Ralph	about 28	African American	Barnwell vicinity	Barnwell	South Carolina	December 28, 1889	Alleged murder of a merchant and another person. Some were only being held as witnesses.	A mob of about 100 took the men from the jail to the outskirts of Barnwell and shot them.
Ladd, Eli	20	African American	Blountsville	Henry	Indiana	February 7, 1890	Assault of a white woman, confronting mob	Shot
Washington, Brown	15	African American	Madison	Morgan	Georgia	February 27–28, 1890	Murder of a 9-year-old white girl	Hanged from a telegraph pole
Williams, William		African American	Kosse	Limestone	Texas	April 3, 1890	Rape of an eight year old white girl	Taken from jail, hanged, and shot multiple times.
Tacho		Native American	Banning	Riverside	California	April 27, 1890	Stealing horses and cattle	Hanged from a telegraph pole
Hargus, Frank		White		Hawkins	Tennessee	August 12, 1890	Rape of a 9-year-old white girl	Hanged from a tree after being found hiding in a cave.
Salceda, Jesus		Latin	Knickerbocker	Tom Green	Texas	February 4, 1891	Seducing a white man's daughter	Three white men took Jesus Salceda and hanged him from an oak tree for supposedly seducing one of the white men's daughters. They later found out that they had mistaken Jesus Salceda for another Mexican.
Champion, Tony		African American	Gainesville	Alachua	Florida	February 17, 1891	Murder	Taken together from jail by mob and hanged.
Kelly, Michael		Irish	Gainesville	Alachua	Florida	February 17, 1891	Murder	Taken together from jail by mob and hanged.
Sanders, Henry		White	Milan	Gibson	Tennessee	March 11, 1891	Rape of a 16-year-old white girl	Hanged from a tree.
11 Italian Americans		Italian	New Orleans	Orleans	Louisiana	March 14, 1891	Killing of police chief	Three had been acquitted; three had a mistrial; five were never tried. Lynching organized by local leaders, including future mayor Walter C. Flower and future governor John M. Parker. Grand jury brought no charges.
Hodges, Lewis		African American	Louisville	Winston	Mississippi	March 14, 1891	Attempted rape of a woman	Moved to a separate jail for safekeeping, kidnapped from the second jail by four men, and lynched in public the day after his kidnapping.
Taylor, Jim		African American	Franklin	Williamson	Tennessee	April 30, 1891	Shooting two white men, including a police officer	Taken from jail and hanged on Murfreesboro Road.
Clark, Robert		African American	Bristol	Sullivan	Tennessee	June 13, 1891	Rape	
Ford, Andrew		African American	Gainesville	Alachua	Florida	August 24, 1891	Beating a man, aiding Harmon Murray	Taken from jail by mob and hanged.
Ortiz, Louis		Latin	Reno	Washoe	Nevada	September 19, 1891	Shooting of Officer Dick Nash	A repeat, violent, intoxicated offender was arrested for shooting the town's night watchman. Prior to due process, a vigilante crew freed Ortiz from jail at gunpoint and hanged him from the Virginia Street Bridge.
Smith, George (AKA Joe Coe)	20	African American	Omaha	Douglas	Nebraska	October 10, 1891	Rape of a 5-year-old white girl	The Governor and the sheriff tried unsuccessfully to quiet the crowd in front of the courthouse. Pieces of the lynching rope were sold as souvenirs. Despite 16 wounds to his body and three broken vertebrae, Coroner said he died of "fright". Grand jury declined to indict.
Rush, John		White	Columbia	Caldwell	Louisiana	October 19, 1891	Murder of an elderly black woman	Taken from jail and hanged.
Lundy, Dick	Adult	African American	Edgefield	Edgefield	South Carolina	December 1891	Murder of son of sheriff	Coroner's jury: "by persons unknown"
Unknown		African American	Waldo	Alachua	Florida	1892	Suspicion of burglary and incendiarism	Hanged.
Hinson, Henry		African American	Micanopy	Alachua	Florida	January 12, 1892	Murder	Hanged.
Corbin, Henry		African American	Oxford	Butler	Ohio	January 14, 1892	Death of a white woman.	Taken from jail and hanged.
Coy, Edward		African American	Texarkana	Miller	Arkansas	February 20, 1892	Attacked a white women	Burned
Moss, Thomas	38–39	African American	Memphis	Shelby	Tennessee	March 9, 1892	Complaint from competing white grocery store owner.	So-called Curve Riot (not a riot). Reported on by Ida B. Wells, whose newspaper was destroyed and had to leave the state.
McDowell, Calvin	32	African American	Memphis	Shelby	Tennessee	March 9, 1892	Complaint from competing white grocery store owner.	So-called Curve Riot (not a riot). Reported on by Ida B. Wells, whose newspaper was destroyed and had to leave the state.
Stewart, Will	Adult	African American	Memphis	Shelby	Tennessee	March 9, 1892	Complaint from competing white grocery store owner.	So-called Curve Riot (not a riot). Reported on by Ida B. Wells, whose newspaper was destroyed and had to leave the state.
Bright, John Wesley		White	Forsyth	Taney	Missouri	March 16, 1892	Killing his wife	Deputy Sheriff George Williams killed by mob who then shot and killed prisoner
Heflin, Lee	29	White		Fauquier	Virginia	March 18, 1892	Convicted murderer	Seized from police when they were trying to move him to a safer location.
Dye, Joseph		White		Fauquier	Virginia	March 18, 1892	Convicted murderer	Seized from police when they were trying to move him to a safer location.
Grizzard, Henry		African American	Nashville	Davidson	Tennessee	April 27, 1892	Assaulting two white girls in Goodlettsville.	Taken out of his prison cell and lynched on a bridge in downtown Nashville in front of 10,000 onlookers. Later taken back to Goodlettsville. Two members of the lynch mob were shot and killed by the police.
Grizzard, Ephraim	44–45	African American	Nashville	Davidson	Tennessee	April 30, 1892	Assaulting two white girls in Goodlettsville.	Taken out of his prison cell and lynched on a bridge in downtown Nashville in front of 10,000 onlookers. Later taken back to Goodlettsville. Two members of the lynch mob were shot and killed by the police.
Redmond, Jim		African American	Clarkesville	Habersham	Georgia	May 17, 1892	Arrested for the fatal assault of Toccoa City Marshal James Carter.	Due to threats against the suspects, they were transferred to a jail in Clarkesville, 15 miles east of Toccoa. A week after their arrest, a mob surrounded the jail, overpowered the guards, and dragged the three suspects out of their cells. Using chains and padlocks, the three victims were hanged from a single tree.
Roberson, Gus		African American	Clarkesville	Habersham	Georgia	May 17, 1892	Arrested for the fatal assault of Toccoa City Marshal James Carter.	Due to threats against the suspects, they were transferred to a jail in Clarkesville, 15 miles east of Toccoa. A week after their arrest, a mob surrounded the jail, overpowered the guards, and dragged the three suspects out of their cells. Using chains and padlocks, the three victims were hanged from a single tree.
Addison, Bob		African American	Clarkesville	Habersham	Georgia	May 17, 1892	Arrested for the fatal assault of Toccoa City Marshal James Carter.	Due to threats against the suspects, they were transferred to a jail in Clarkesville, 15 miles east of Toccoa. A week after their arrest, a mob surrounded the jail, overpowered the guards, and dragged the three suspects out of their cells. Using chains and padlocks, the three victims were hanged from a single tree.
Taylor, James	23	African American	Kennedyville	Kent	Maryland	May 19, 1892	Accused of the rape of 11-year-old Nettie (Nellie) Silcox on May 16, 1892	By 9:00 p.m. on May 19, nearly 1,000 men and women gathered at the jail. A body of masked men carrying an assortment of weapons demanded the Sheriff open the jail's door. When the Sheriff refused, the men used a sledgehammer to breach the door rushed in, and swiftly overpowered the Sheriff and other officers on duty. The mob placed a rope around Taylor's neck and dragged him down the steps and out of the jail into Cross Street. They hanged him from a tree just outside the city limits at a point between the Rockwell House and the old Armstrong Hotel.
Stewart, Charles			Perryville	Perry	Arkansas	May 21, 1892	Rape	Suspect killed Deputy Sheriff T Holmes while escaping from jail; lynched by posse.
Lewis, Robert	28	African American	Port Jervis	Orange	New York	June 2, 1892	Assaulting a white woman	Hanged.
Bates, William		White	Shelbyville	Bedford	Tennessee	June 27, 1892	Alleged murder of his wife	Mob formed as officers were transporting Bates to jail. He was hanged.
Donnelly, Robert		African American	Marianna	Lee	Arkansas	June 29, 1892	Kidnapping and rape of a 12-year-old black girl	Taken from jail and hanged by African American mob.
Mosley, Julian		African American	Halley	Desha	Arkansas	July 13, 1892	Rape of his 7-year-old stepdaughter	Taken from jail and hanged from a tree by an African American mob.
Ruggles, John	33	African American	Redding	Shasta	California	July 24, 1892	Stagecoach robbery and murder	Hanged from a derrick
Ruggles, Charles	33	African American	Redding	Shasta	California	July 24, 1892	Stagecoach robbery and murder	Hanged from a derrick
Smith, Henry	17	African American	Paris	Lamar	Texas	February 1, 1893	Kidnapping and murder of white girl; Smith confessed under duress.	Tortured, burned with hot irons, doused in oil and set afire; his remains were sold as souvenirs.
Peterson, John	Adult	African American	Denmark	Bamberg (at the time, Barnwell)	South Carolina	April 24, 1893	Attack on a white girl	
Blount, Alfred		African American	Chattanooga	Hamilton	Tennessee	February 9, 1893	Assault	Beaten, stabbed, and hanged from Walnut Street Bridge
Bush, Samuel J.		African American	Decatur	Macon	Illinois	June 3, 1893	Rape of a white woman, Minnie Cameron Vest	Hanged from a telephone pole at the corner of Wood and Water streets
Shorter, William	17	African American	Winchester	N/A (independent city)	Virginia	June 13, 1893	Assault on a white woman	
Miller, C.J.		African American	Bardwell	Carlisle	Kentucky	July 7, 1893	Killing two white girls	Despite no evidence that he was the murderer, he was taken from jail and hanged and his dead body cremated. Investigated by journalist Ida B. Wells.
Willis, Charles		African American	Rochelle	Alachua	Florida	January 12, 1894	Being a "desperado"	Shot and burned in bed.
Puryear, Richard	about 35	African American	Stroudsburg	Monroe	Pennsylvania	March 15, 1894	Murder	Lynched by a mob after escaping from jail.
Hicks, Amos		African American	Rocky Springs	Claiborne	Mississippi	May 17, 1894	Arson	Shot
Williams, Stephen		African American	Upper Marlboro	Prince George	Maryland	October 20, 1894	Rape of a white woman	Hanged from a bridge and shot
Jackson, William		African American	Ocala	Marion	Florida	December 1, 1894	Rape of a black woman	Hanged by African American mob
Rawls, William		African American	Newnansville	Alachua	Florida	April 2, 1895	Murder	Hanged and shot.
Henson, Jacob		African American	Ellicott City	Howard	Maryland	May 28, 1895	Murder	Hanged
Divers, Emmett	Adult	African American	Fulton	Callaway	Missouri	August 15, 1895	Murder of a white woman; Jennie E. Cain	"Horrible fury of the mob...500 horsemen." Hanged from bridge until dead, taken down and hanged a second time from a telegraph pole at the fairground, "at the request of the murdered woman's husband, John William Cain". Body and cabin burned.
Unknown farmhand		African American		Simpson	Mississippi	August 30, 1895	Being the father to the child of a 14 year old white girl he had been intimate with. She confessed to being intimate with one of the black farm hands after the child she birthed was black	He was captured by an angry mob who took him to a tree and hanged him then riddled his body with bullets.
Suiato, Floantina		Latin	Cotulla	La Salle	Texas	October 12, 1895	Murder	10 masked man went into the jail where Suiato was being held, took him to the banks of the Nueces River, where they hanged him from a tree and riddled his body with bullets
Hilliard, Robert Henson		African American	Tyler	Dewitt	Texas	October 29, 1895	Rape and murder of a white woman	Burned.
Smith, George		English	Ransomville	Niagara	New York	January 10, 1896	Murder of his father-in-law and wounding a posseman	Shot by mob; ruled by coroner as suicide
Castellán, Aureliano		Latin	San Antonio	Bexar	Texas	January 30, 1896	Accused of looking at a white woman	Shot and burned
Crawford, Foster		White	Wichita Falls	Wichita	Texas	February 26, 1896	Bank robbery and killing of cashier Frank Dorsey	On February 25, 1896, two cowboys robbed the city national bank, murdered cashier Frank Dorsey and stole $410. They were eventually arrested. On the night of February 26, 1896, a mob stormed the prison, dragged the pair from the jail and hanged them in front of the bank building
Lewis, Elmer "Kid"	20	White	Wichita Falls	Wichita	Texas	February 26, 1896	Bank robbery and killing of cashier Frank Dorsey	On February 25, 1896, two cowboys robbed the city national bank, murdered cashier Frank Dorsey and stole $410. They were eventually arrested. On the night of February 26, 1896, a mob stormed the prison, dragged the pair from the jail and hanged them in front of the bank building
Cocking, Joseph	34–35	English	Port Tobacco	Charles	Maryland	June 28, 1896	Murder of his wife and sister-in-law	Hanged on a bridge at the outskirts of town
Randolph, Sidney	Adult	African American	Gaithersburg	Montgomery	Maryland	July 4, 1896	Killing a white girl	Taken from the jail by a mob.
Saladino, Lorenzo	33–36	Italian	Hahnville	St. Charles	Louisiana	August 8, 1896	Murder	Saladino was accused of murdering a wealthy merchant. Arena and Venturella happened to have been in the same prison, accused of a different murder. All were rounded up together and lynched to "teach the lawless Italians a salutary lesson." After the lynching, another person confessed to the murder for which Arena and Venturella had been lynched.
Arena, Salvatore	27	Italian	Hahnville	St. Charles	Louisiana	August 8, 1896	Murder	Saladino was accused of murdering a wealthy merchant. Arena and Venturella happened to have been in the same prison, accused of a different murder. All were rounded up together and lynched to "teach the lawless Italians a salutary lesson." After the lynching, another person confessed to the murder for which Arena and Venturella had been lynched.
Venturella, Giuseppe	48	Italian	Hahnville	St. Charles	Louisiana	August 8, 1896	Murder	Saladino was accused of murdering a wealthy merchant. Arena and Venturella happened to have been in the same prison, accused of a different murder. All were rounded up together and lynched to "teach the lawless Italians a salutary lesson." After the lynching, another person confessed to the murder for which Arena and Venturella had been lynched.
Daniels, Alfred		African American	Gainesville	Alachua	Florida	November 26, 1896	Suspicion of arson (barn burning) (no evidence)	Taken by mob on way to jail, hanged and shot.
McCoy, Joseph	19	African American	Alexandria	N/A (independent city)	Virginia	April 23, 1897	Assault on a young girl	
Mitchell, Charles	23	African American	Urbana	Champaign	Ohio	June 4, 1897	Rape and robbery of a white woman	Hanged from a tree after pleading guilty. Three members of the lynch mob were shot and killed by the police.
Andrews, William	17	African American	Princess Anne	Somerset	Maryland	June 9, 1897	Rape of a white woman	Hanged from a walnut tree after pleading guilty and being sentenced to death.
Holy Track, Paul	19	Native American	Williamsport	Emmons	North Dakota	November 13, 1897	Murder of a white family	Hanged from a beef windlass
Coudot, Alex		Native American	Williamsport	Emmons	North Dakota	November 13, 1897	Murder of a white family	Hanged from a beef windlass
Ireland, Phillip		Native American	Williamsport	Emmons	North Dakota	November 13, 1897	Murder of a white family	Hanged from a beef windlass
Murray, James		White	Bonanza	Sebastian	Arkansas	December 6, 1897		Victim was a law officer who was shot and lynched by friends of a man who had been arrested for murder
McGeisey, Lincoln	18	Seminole	Maud		Oklahoma Territory	January 8, 1898	Rape and murder of a white woman	Chained by the neck and burned alive. Six members of the lynch mob, including a deputy U.S. Marshal, were convicted of kidnapping and arson and sentenced to prison terms ranging from 3 to 21 years.
Sampson, Palmer	17	Seminole	Maud		Oklahoma Territory	January 8, 1898	Rape and murder of a white woman	Chained by the neck and burned alive. Six members of the lynch mob, including a deputy U.S. Marshal, were convicted of kidnapping and arson and sentenced to prison terms ranging from 3 to 21 years.
Baker, Frazier B.	41	African American	Lake City	Florence	South Carolina	February 22, 1898	Appointed Postmaster	House burned by white mob. Infant daughter killed. Grand jury did not indict. Since it was a federal crime (attack on a postmaster), there were 13 Federal indictments; no one was convicted.
Baker, Julia	2	African American	Lake City	Florence	South Carolina	February 22, 1898		House burned by white mob. Infant daughter killed. Grand jury did not indict. Since it was a federal crime (attack on a postmaster), there were 13 Federal indictments; no one was convicted.
King, Garfield	18	African American	Salisbury	Wicomico	Maryland	May 25, 1898	Shooting a white man	Hanged from a tree outside the courthouse; shot and beaten.
James, John Henry	Adult	African American	Charlottesville (near)	Albemarle	Virginia	July 12, 1898	Rape of a white woman	Hanged and shot by a mob which included the accuser's brother, Carl Hotopp. Carl Hotopp was died after falling out of a moving train in 1901.
Puckett, Lee		African American	Stuart	Patrick	Virginia	September 12, 1898	Attempted rape of a white woman	Shot mob of men. Puckett was a borderline intellectually disabled mental patient. Six members of the lynch mob were convicted of second degree murder. C. T. Thompson was sentenced to six years in prison and the others received 5-year sentences. One convict, L.D. McMillan, murdered someone while on bail. He was convicted of second degree murder and received a consecutive 18-year sentence.
John Anderson		African American	LaFayette	Chambers	Alabama	October 23, 1898	Murder	Hanged
Wright Smith	56	African American	Annapolis	Anne Arundel	Maryland	October 5, 1898	Rape of a white woman	Identified by the accuser, Mary Morrison, as the man who broke into her house and raped her. Mob broke Smith out of jail and riddled his body with bullets.
F. W. Stewart	Adult	African American	Lacon	Marshall	Illinois	November 7, 1898	Rape of a white girl	O'Brien was the daughter of a miner. About 100 miners broke into the county jail, abducted Stewart, and hanged him.
Eight or more		African American	Phoenix	Greenwood	South Carolina	November 1898	Phoenix election riot	Eight or more men were lynched.
Sam Hose	about 24	African American	Newnan	Coweta	Georgia	April 23, 1899	Murder of his white employer and rape of his employer's wife	Body parts for sale in a store. Widely publicized and privately investigated.
Francesco DiFatta		Italian	Tallulah	Madison	Louisiana	July 20, 1899	Shooting a doctor	Sicilian immigrant grocery store owners, the DiFatta brothers, quarreled with a local doctor. The doctor fired his pistol at Carlo and was immediately shot and injured by Giuseppe. Sicilian immigrants Cerami and Fiducia were not involved in the dispute and had simply been nearby when the lynching occurred; they were rounded up and lynched alongside the DiFatta brothers because they were Italian.
Giuseppe DiFatta		Italian	Tallulah	Madison	Louisiana	July 20, 1899	Shooting a doctor	Sicilian immigrant grocery store owners, the DiFatta brothers, quarreled with a local doctor. The doctor fired his pistol at Carlo and was immediately shot and injured by Giuseppe. Sicilian immigrants Cerami and Fiducia were not involved in the dispute and had simply been nearby when the lynching occurred; they were rounded up and lynched alongside the DiFatta brothers because they were Italian.
Pasquale DiFatta		Italian	Tallulah	Madison	Louisiana	July 20, 1899	Shooting a doctor	Sicilian immigrant grocery store owners, the DiFatta brothers, quarreled with a local doctor. The doctor fired his pistol at Carlo and was immediately shot and injured by Giuseppe. Sicilian immigrants Cerami and Fiducia were not involved in the dispute and had simply been nearby when the lynching occurred; they were rounded up and lynched alongside the DiFatta brothers because they were Italian.
Giovanni Cerami		Italian	Tallulah	Madison	Louisiana	July 20, 1899	Shooting a doctor	Sicilian immigrant grocery store owners, the DiFatta brothers, quarreled with a local doctor. The doctor fired his pistol at Carlo and was immediately shot and injured by Giuseppe. Sicilian immigrants Cerami and Fiducia were not involved in the dispute and had simply been nearby when the lynching occurred; they were rounded up and lynched alongside the DiFatta brothers because they were Italian.
Rosario Fiducia		Italian	Tallulah	Madison	Louisiana	July 20, 1899	Shooting a doctor	Sicilian immigrant grocery store owners, the DiFatta brothers, quarreled with a local doctor. The doctor fired his pistol at Carlo and was immediately shot and injured by Giuseppe. Sicilian immigrants Cerami and Fiducia were not involved in the dispute and had simply been nearby when the lynching occurred; they were rounded up and lynched alongside the DiFatta brothers because they were Italian.
Frank Embree		African American	Fayette	Howard	Missouri	July 29, 1899	Rape of a 14-year-old white girl	Taken from officers and lynched
Benjamin Thomas	16	African American	Alexandria	N/A (independent city)	Virginia	August 8, 1899	Attempted rape of an 8-year-old white girl	Hanged from a lamppost at Cameron and Lee Sts., site of several lynchings.
Martin Severts		White	Lituya Bay	Unorganized	Alaska Territory	October 1899	Murder of a miner	Hanged from a tree following a mock trial at his own request.

== 20th century ==
=== 1900–1909 ===
Name	Age	Ethnicity	City	County/Parish	State	Date	Accusation	Comment
Watt, W.W.		White	Newport News	an independent city	Virginia	January 5, 1900	Assault	Shot
Gause, Anderson		African American	Henning	Lauderdale	Tennessee	January 16, 1900	Helping two Black prisoners to escape who had killed two law officers.	Mr. Gause was hanged from a tree.
Silsbee, George		White	Fort Scott	Bourbon	Kansas	January 20, 1900	Murder	Taken from jail and lynched
Silsbee, Ed		White	Fort Scott	Bourbon	Kansas	January 20, 1900	Murder	Taken from jail and lynched
Clayton, Thomas		African American	Hernando	DeSoto	Mississippi	March 9, 1900	Rape of a 10-year-old black girl	Shot by an African American mob.
Cotton, Walter		African American	Emporia	Greensville	Virginia	March 24, 1900	Accused of murder	Cotton killed by a white mob; O'Grady Killed by African American mob
O'Grady, Brandt		White	Emporia	Greensville	Virginia	March 24, 1900	Accused of murder	Cotton killed by a white mob; O'Grady Killed by African American mob
Lee, William	29	African American	Hinton	Summers	West Virginia	May 11, 1900	Assault on a white woman	
Pete, Dago		African American	Tutwiler	Tallahatchie	Mississippi	June 1900	Assaulted colored woman	Killed by African American mob
Wright, Charlotte	62	White	Gilman	Iroquois	Illinois	August 27, 1900	Performed an abortion that killed a 16-year-old girl	Shot during shoot-out with sheriff and angry mob that set fire to her home
Mills, Avery	about 22	African American	Forest City	Rutherford	North Carolina	August 29, 1900	Murder	Shot
Porter, Preston	15	African American	Limon	Colorado	Colorado	November 16, 1900	Rape and murder of a 12 year old white girl	Burned alive by a mob. The lynching resulted in Colorado reinstating the death penalty to deter future lynchings.
Rowland, Bud		African American	Rockport	Spencer	Indiana	December 16, 1900	Murder	Hanged from a tree on the east side of the Rockport courthouse before shooting his body with bullets
Henderson, Jim		African American	Rockport	Spencer	Indiana	December 16, 1900	Murder	Shot in his cell, dragged across the courtyard, hanged next to Rowland
Rolla, John		African American	Boonville	Warrick	Indiana	December 17, 1900	Murder	Hanged in front of the Boonville Courthouse
Dodson, Ed		African American		Quitman	Georgia	January 2, 1901	Rape of a 7-year-old black girl	Shot by an African American mob.
Alexander, Fred	22	African American	Leavenworth	Leavenworth	Kansas	January 15, 1901	Rape and murder allegations	Lynched and burned at stake
Carter, George		African American	Paris	Bourbon	Kentucky	February 11, 1901	"Assaulting a white woman."	
Berryman, Peter	45	African American	Mena	Polk	Arkansas	February 20, 1901	Kicking a young White girl	Beaten, shot, and hanged
Ward, George		African American	Terre Haute	Vigo	Indiana	February 26, 1901	Suspected of murder of a white woman	Struck in head with sledgehammer. Hanged from bridge, burned; toes and hobnails from boots kept as souvenirs.
Crutchfield, Ballie		African American	Rome	Smith	Tennessee	March 15, 1901	Revenge for an alleged theft committed by the victim's brother	Bound, shot, and thrown in a creek
Brigman, Felton		African American			Louisiana	May 3, 1901	Rape of a 6-year-old black girl	Taken from jail and hanged by an African American mob.
Rochelle, Fred	16	African American	Bartow	Polk	Florida	May 29, 1901	Rape and murder of a white woman	Doused with kerosene and burned. Special train from Lakeland to see the "barbecue".
Davis, Charles		White	Smithville	DeKalb	Tennessee	August 2, 1901	Rape of a 14-year-old white girl	Taken from jail and hanged. Three police officers and the girl's father were seriously injured in the clash between the police and the mob. The cousin and grandfather of the girl were charged for participating in the lynching, but it was unclear whether anyone was convicted.
Godley, William	32	African American	Pierce	Lawrence	Missouri	August 20, 1901	Murder of a white woman	Seized from jail by mob and lynched. Mob subsequently went on a rampage in a nearby black community
Godley, French	70	African American	Pierce	Lawrence	Missouri	August 20, 1901		William's grandfather; shot to death
Hampton, Peter		African American	Pierce	Lawrence	Missouri	August 20, 1901		Burned alive in his home
Wilson, Matthew	35	White	Rutherford	Gibson	Tennessee	October 25, 1901	Attempted rape of his 16-year-old sister-in-law	Shot seven times. Wilson had been convicted of attempted rape several years earlier, but his conviction was reversed on a technical error.
Estes, Silas		African American	Hodgenville	LaRue	Kentucky	October 31, 1901	"Forcing...a 15 year old boy...to commit a crime."	Taken from jail at 2:00 a.m. by a mob of 50 or 75 persons and hanged in front of the courthouse.
Yellow Wolf, John		Native American (Rosebud Sioux)	Deadwood	Lawrence	South Dakota	January 18, 1902	Horse stealing	After being released from jail, he was given a worthless horse and saddle, while on his way to the reservation he grew up in, he spotted a young horse that he wanted. A group of men took over Yellow Wolf and hanged him from a tree near White River.
Carter, James	20	African American	Amherst	Amherst	Virginia	April 5, 1902	Unknown	
Unknown		African American	Savannah	Chatham	Georgia	April 16, 1902	Accused of assaulting white woman and killing her son	Suspect Richard Young was sought on March 27, 1902, injuring Mrs Fountain and mortally injuring her son Dower Fountain. Victim was hanged and burned in a swamp However, victim was not suspect Richard Young-since Richard Young and accomplice James Stewart were captured, tried and sentenced to prison in June 1902
Gillespie, James	11	African American	Salisbury	Rowan	North Carolina	June 11, 1902	Murder of a white woman	Two brothers were accused of stoning a neighbor to death. Hanged by a mob of an estimated 400 persons and their bodies shot dozens of times.
Gillespie, Harrison	13	African American	Salisbury	Rowan	North Carolina	June 11, 1902	Murder of a white woman	Two brothers were accused of stoning a neighbor to death. Hanged by a mob of an estimated 400 persons and their bodies shot dozens of times.
Craven, Charles	22	African American	Leesburg	Loudoun	Virginia	July 31, 1902	Assault	
Price, Manny		African American	Newberry	Alachua	Florida	September 1, 1902	Murder	Taken by mob on way to jail, hanged and shot.
Scruggs, Robert		African American	Newberry	Alachua	Florida	September 1, 1902	Suspected accomplice	Taken by mob on way to jail, hanged and shot.
Tucker, Alonzo	28	African American	Marshfield	Coos	Oregon	September 18, 1902	Assaulting a white woman	Shot, hanged from 7th Street bridge
Brown, Curtis and Burley, Garfield		African American	Newbern	Dyer	Tennessee	October 8, 1902	One confessed to murder of a white man and claimed the other was accomplice	
Dillard, James		African American	Sullivan	Sullivan	Indiana	November 20, 1902	Rape of two white women	
Vazquez and Unknown Mexican	17, unknown	Latino	Huachuca Mountains	Cochise	Arizona Territory	1903	Stealing cattle and skinning stolen beef	Vazquez was found hanging from the tree and was suspected to be one of the Mexicans stealing cattle from the ranch of Will Parker, who discovered the 17 year old. Three Mexicans were also caught nearby skinning stolen beef, with which they tried to escape arrest, but one of the Mexicans who did was fatally shot.
Fambro, William		African American	Griffin	Spalding	Georgia	February 24, 1903	Insulted white home	
Johnson, William		African American	Thebes	Alexander	Illinois	April 26, 1903	Assaulting a girl	Hanged
Malone, "Rev" D.M.	50	White	Wardell, Missouri	Pemiscot	Missouri	May 3, 1903	Suspect had been arrested for living with woman not his wife	When mob burned the man's house down, Constable W. J. Monneyhan placed man under arrest in his own home to protect him. Officer was killed by mob, who then shot and killed prisoner.
Jarvis, Washington	25	White	Madison	Madison	Florida	May 20, 1903	Accused of murdering his cousin.	
Unknown		African American	St. Louis	St. Louis	Missouri	June 1903	Assaulted African American woman and a white girl	Hanged on tripod
Wyatt, David		African American	Brooklyn	St. Clair	Illinois	June 6, 1903	Shooting superintendent Charles Hertel	Hanged from a telephone pole and burned.
White, George	24	African American	Wilmington	New Castle	Delaware	June 23, 1903	Accused of sexually assaulting and stabbing to death an 18-year-old girl	Taken from the city jail by a mob and burned alive.
Gorman, Jim and Walters, J.P.			Basin, Wyoming	Big Horn	Wyoming	July 19, 1903	each accused of a murder	Deputy Sheriff C. E. Pierce was killed by mob, who then shot the prisoners
Steers, Jennie	Adult	African American	rural area near Shreveport	Caddo	Louisiana	July 25, 1903	Poisoning daughter of a planter	
Mayfield, J. D.		African American	Danville	Vermilion	Illinois	July 25, 1903	Murder of Henry Gatterman, member a mob intending to lynch James Wilson	Hanged from a telephone pole. Body burned, shot, and hacked.
Surasky, Abraham	30	Jewish-American	rural area near Aiken	Aiken	South Carolina	July 29, 1903	Being a Jewish-American peddler who was helping the murderer's wife carry some things to her house.	Murdered by gun and ax; an antisemitic murder.
Hellom		African American		Mississippi	Arkansas	September 1903	Rape of two young black girls, ages 5 and 10	Taken from jail and hanged by an African American mob.
Lee, "General"		African American	Reevesville	Dorchester	South Carolina	January 13, 1904	Knocking on the door of a white woman's house	
Clark, Jumbo		African American	High Springs	Alachua	Florida	January 14, 1904	Assault of 14 year old white girl	Taken by mob on way to jail, hanged and shot.
Holbert, Luther		African American	Doddsville	Sunflower	Mississippi	February 7, 1904	Murder of a white landowner	Tortured and burned alive; crowd of some 600 attended the lynching.
Unnamed female		African American	Doddsville	Sunflower	Mississippi	February 7, 1904	Murder of a white landowner	Tortured and burned alive; crowd of some 600 attended the lynching.
Dickerson, Richard		African American	Springfield	Clark	Ohio	March 7, 1904	Murder of a Patrolman Charles B. Collis	Shot and then hanged
Thompson, Marie		African American	Lebanon Junction	Bullitt	Kentucky	June 15, 1904	Killing John Irvin, a white landowner	Hanged from a tree, escaped and was shot. Died the following day in jail of her injuries.
Cato, Will		African American	Statesboro	Bulloch	Georgia	August 16, 1904	Murder of five members of a family	Seized by mob from courthouse after conviction for murder, chained to stump and burned
Reed, Paul	25–26	African American	Statesboro	Bulloch	Georgia	August 16, 1904	Murder of five members of a family	Seized by mob from courthouse after conviction for murder, chained to stump and burned
Maples, Horace		African American	Huntsville	Madison	Alabama	September 7, 1904	Murder	Mob of 2,000 burned jail where he was held, then hanged and shot him.
Munoz, Carlos		Latino	Lockhart	Caldwell	Texas	1905	Assaulting a White woman	After assaulting one of the farmers' wives, Munoz ran off where officers captured him and tried protecting him, but were overpowered by the mob of 40+ people who dragged him to into the woods, where they shot and hanged Munoz.
Aycock, Alonzo		White	Watkinsville	Oconee	Georgia	June 30, 1905	Murder of a man and his wife	Shot
Elder, Claude		African American	Watkinsville	Oconee	Georgia	June 30, 1905	Accomplice to murder	Shot
Robinson, Lewis		African American	Watkinsville	Oconee	Georgia	June 30, 1905	Accomplice to murder	Shot
Robinson, Richard		African American	Watkinsville	Oconee	Georgia	June 30, 1905	Accomplice to murder	Shot
Allen, Richard		African American	Watkinsville	Oconee	Georgia	June 30, 1905	Murder	Shot
Yerby, Gene		African American	Watkinsville	Oconee	Georgia	June 30, 1905	Theft	Shot
Harris, Robert		African American	Watkinsville	Oconee	Georgia	June 30, 1905	Assault	Shot
Price, Sandy	20	African American	Watkinsville	Oconee	Georgia	June 30, 1905	Attempted rape	Shot
Goodman, Augustus		African American	Bainbridge	Decatur	Georgia	November 4, 1905	Accused of killing Decatur County Sheriff Martin C. Stegall on October 29, 1905	
Green, Jim		African American	Boyle	Bolivar	Mississippi	December 12, 1905	Rape of an 8-year-old black girl	Hanged by an African American mob.
Richardson, Bunk		African American	Gadsden	Etowah	Alabama	February 11, 1906	Not charged	Was arrested/held as a witness for one of three defendants accused of rape and murder of a white woman. The three defendants were sentenced to death, but the governor commuted to life one man's sentence. Angry at the lighter sentence, a mob seized Richardson from the jail and hanged him from a train trestle over the Coosa River.
Johnson, Ed	23–24	African American	Chattanooga	Hamilton	Tennessee	March 19, 1906	Rape of a white woman	Hanged from Walnut Street Bridge. Sheriff and two others sentenced to three months in jail, three others to two months, for abetting the lynching. Only criminal case ever with direct involvement of the U.S. Supreme Court; see United States v. Shipp
Duncan, Horace B.	20	African American	Springfield	Greene	Missouri	April 14, 1906	Assault of white woman	Fred Coker, Horace B. Duncan, and William (Bill) Allen were lynched by large mob of white citizens, though they were innocent. All three suspects were hanged from the Gottfried Tower, which held a replica of the Statue of Liberty, and burned in the courthouse square by a mob of more than 2,000 citizens. Duncan's and Coker's employer testified that they were at his business at the time of the crime against Edwards, and other evidence suggested that they and Allen were all innocent. After the mass lynching in Springfield, many African Americans left the area in a large exodus. Judge Azariah W. Lincoln called for a grand jury, but no one was prosecuted. The proceedings were covered by national newspapers, the New York Times and Los Angeles Times.
Coker, Fred	21	African American	Springfield	Greene	Missouri	April 14, 1906	Assault of white woman	
Allen, William	25	African American	Springfield	Greene	Missouri	April 14, 1906	Assault of white woman	
Rogers, R. T.		White	Tallulah	Madison	Louisiana	May 29, 1906	Murder of Girard merchant Jesse Brown	Hanged
Gillepsie, Nease		African American	Salisbury	Rowan	North Carolina	August 6, 1906	Accused of murdering a white family	The five men were arrested and accused of the murder several members of a local white family, the Lyerlys. When returned for a court hearing and while under heavy guard, a mob led by George Hall pulled Dillingham and the Gillepsies, father and son, from their jail cells. They were paraded through the town and hanged from a tree at the Henderson Ballground near the corner of Long and Henderson Streets. George Hall, a leading member of the mob, was convicted of conspiracy to commit murder for his involvement and was sentenced to 15 years in prison with hard labor. He was granted clemency by Governor William Walton Kitchin in October 1911.
Gillepsie, John	16	African American	Salisbury	Rowan	North Carolina	August 6, 1906	Accused of murdering a white family	
Dillingham, "Jack"		African American	Salisbury	Rowan	North Carolina	August 6, 1906	Accused of murdering a white family	
Lee, Henry		African American	Salisbury	Rowan	North Carolina	August 6, 1906	Accused of murdering a white family	
Irwin, George		African American	Salisbury	Rowan	North Carolina	August 6, 1906	Accused of murdering a white family	
Robinson, Dick and Thompson		African American	Pritchard	Mobile	Alabama	October 6, 1906	Assaulting white women	
Davis, Anthony	40	African American	Texarkana	Miller County	Arkansas	October 9, 1906	Rape of a 15/16-year-old black girl	Hanged by an African American mob.
Pitts, Slab		African American	Toyah	Reeves	Texas	October 26, 1906	Living with a white woman	Dragged to death before being hanged.
Davis, Henry		African American	Annapolis	Anne Arundel	Maryland	December 21, 1906	Assaulting a white woman	Dragged from his jail cell and shot over 100 times. Last known lynching in Anne Arundel County.
Cullen, James	62	White (Irish)	Charles City	Floyd	Iowa	January 9, 1907	Murdered his wife and stepson	Hanged
Higgins, Loris		White	Bancroft	Thurston	Nebraska	August 27, 1907	Murder of a farmer and his wife and rape of daughter	Taken from law officers, hanged from a bridge over creek, and then shot.
Burns, William	22	African American	Cumberland	Allegany	Maryland	October 6, 1907	Alleged murder of Patrolman August Baker.	A crowd estimated at 10,000 examined the lynching victim's body.
Long, Jack		White	Newberry	Alachua	Florida	February 6, 1908	Murder	Hanged.
Pigot, Eli		African American	Brookhaven	Lincoln	Mississippi	February 10, 1908	Rape of a white woman	Shot and hanged.
Scott, Charley		African American	Conroe	Montgomery	Texas	February 28, 1908	Peeping Tom looking in windows	Hanged on tree
Williams, Earnest		African American	Parkdale	Ashley	Arkansas	June 1908	Using offensive language	
Evans, Jerry	22	African American	Hemphill	Sabine	Texas	June 15, 1908	Murder of two white men	Williams was shot while trying to escape. The other five were hanged by a mob of an estimated 150.
Johnson, Will	24	African American	Hemphill	Sabine	Texas	June 15, 1908	Murder of two white men	Williams was shot while trying to escape. The other five were hanged by a mob of an estimated 150.
Spellman, Moss	24	African American	Hemphill	Sabine	Texas	June 15, 1908	Murder of two white men	Williams was shot while trying to escape. The other five were hanged by a mob of an estimated 150.
Williams, Cleveland	27	African American	Hemphill	Sabine	Texas	June 15, 1908	Murder of two white men	Williams was shot while trying to escape. The other five were hanged by a mob of an estimated 150.
Manuel, Will	25	African American	Hemphill	Sabine	Texas	June 15, 1908	Murder of two white men	Williams was shot while trying to escape. The other five were hanged by a mob of an estimated 150.
Williams, Frank	20	African American	Hemphill	Sabine	Texas	June 15, 1908	Murder of two white men	Williams was shot while trying to escape. The other five were hanged by a mob of an estimated 150.
Smith, Ted	18	African American	Greenville	Hunt	Texas	July 27, 1908	Rape of a 16-year old white girl	After victim identified suspect as the person who assaulted her, Smith was taken by mob from Sheriff and lynched (burned)
Shaw, Leander	35	African American	Pensacola	Escambia	Florida	July 29, 1908	Attempted murder and rape of a white woman (the victim later died from her injuries)	After Shaw was identified by the victim, he was arrested and taken to the county jail. An angry white mob broke into the jail and took Shaw, lynching him in Plaza Ferdinand VII. Three members of the lynch mob were shot and killed by the police.
Riley, Joseph		African American	Russellville	Logan	Kentucky	July 31, 1908	Victims expressed approval of their lodge brother Rufus Browder's killing his employer.	Rufus Browder killed his employer with an axe after being shot in the chest. Browder was arrested and sent to Louisville. The lynching victims expressed approval for his actions and were jailed for disturbing the peace. On August 1, 1908, a mob demanded release of the men, and lynched them from a tree. A note pinned to one of the men read, "Let this be a warning to you niggers to let white people alone or you will go the same way."
Jones, Virgil		African American	Russellville	Logan	Kentucky	July 31, 1908	Victims expressed approval of their lodge brother Rufus Browder's killing his employer.	Rufus Browder killed his employer with an axe after being shot in the chest. Browder was arrested and sent to Louisville. The lynching victims expressed approval for his actions and were jailed for disturbing the peace. On August 1, 1908, a mob demanded release of the men, and lynched them from a tree. A note pinned to one of the men read, "Let this be a warning to you niggers to let white people alone or you will go the same way."
Jones, Robert		African American	Russellville	Logan	Kentucky	July 31, 1908	Victims expressed approval of their lodge brother Rufus Browder's killing his employer.	Rufus Browder killed his employer with an axe after being shot in the chest. Browder was arrested and sent to Louisville. The lynching victims expressed approval for his actions and were jailed for disturbing the peace. On August 1, 1908, a mob demanded release of the men, and lynched them from a tree. A note pinned to one of the men read, "Let this be a warning to you niggers to let white people alone or you will go the same way."
Jones, Thomas		African American	Russellville	Logan	Kentucky	July 31, 1908	Victims expressed approval of their lodge brother Rufus Browder's killing his employer.	Rufus Browder killed his employer with an axe after being shot in the chest. Browder was arrested and sent to Louisville. The lynching victims expressed approval for his actions and were jailed for disturbing the peace. On August 1, 1908, a mob demanded release of the men, and lynched them from a tree. A note pinned to one of the men read, "Let this be a warning to you niggers to let white people alone or you will go the same way."
Miller, William		African American	Brighton	Jefferson	Alabama	August 1908	Labor activist	Jefferson County had the highest number of lynchings in Alabama (29).
Patton, Lawson "Nelse"		African American	Oxford	Lafayette	Mississippi	September 8, 1908	Murder of a white woman	Prominent attorney and former U.S. Senator William V. Sullivan, in his own words, "led the mob...and I'm proud of it."
Walker, David, his wife and four children		African American	Hickman	Fulton	Kentucky	October 3, 1908	Unclear (if any)	Shot by the Ku Klux Klan.
Hilliard	18	African American	Hope	Hempstead	Arkansas	1909	Using inappropriate language with a white woman	Hanged from a telephone pole.
Wades, Jake		African-American	Lakeland	Polk	Florida	1909	Rape of a white woman	Transported from Gainesville to Lakeland to be identified and lynched.
Brown, Joe		White	Whitmer	Randolph	West Virginia	March 25, 1909	Shooting a law officer	
Miller, Jim	47	White	Ada	Pontotoc	Oklahoma	April 19, 1909	Suspicion of murder of a lawman	Lynched by a mob along with Berry Burrell, Joseph Allen, and Jesse West.
Burrell, Berry	38	White	Ada	Pontotoc	Oklahoma	April 19, 1909	Suspicion of murder of a lawman	Lynched by a mob along with Jim Miller, Joseph Allen, and Jesse West.
Allen, Joseph	43	White	Ada	Pontotoc	Oklahoma	April 19, 1909	Suspicion of murder of a lawman	Lynched by a mob along with Jim Miller, Berry Burrell, and Jesse West.
West, Jesse	46	White	Ada	Pontotoc	Oklahoma	April 19, 1909	Suspicion of murder of a lawman	Lynched by a mob along with Jim Miller, Berry Burrell, and Joseph Allen.
James, William	24	African American	Cairo	Alexander	Illinois	November 11, 1909	Rape and murder of a white woman	
Salzner, Henry	30	White	Cairo	Alexander	Illinois	November 11, 1909	Murder of his wife	Dragged from his jail cell and hanged from a telegraph pole.

=== 1910–1919 ===
Name	Age	Ethnicity	City	County/Parish	State	Date	Accusation	Comment
Brooks, Allen	60	African American	Dallas	Dallas	Texas	March 3, 1910	Rape of a two-and-a-half year old white girl	On March 3, 1910, Brooks was in the Dallas County Courthouse to face trial. A mob tied a rope around his neck and pulled him out of the courthouse window. Brooks landed on his head on the street below. He was dragged by a car to Elks Arch at the intersection of Main Street and Akard Street. There the mob hanged him from a telephone pole.
Etherington, Carl Mayes	17	White	Newark	Licking	Ohio	July 8, 1910	Killing a man in self defense	Etherington had been sworn in as a law officer by the Granville town mayor to enforce "prohibition" of alcohol in a "wet town"; shot and killed a man who assaulted him; officer taken from jail and lynched by mob in Newark, Ohio
Gentry, Henry		African American	Belton	Bell	Texas	July 24, 1910	Murder of Constable J. Mitchell	Shot and burned
Albano, Angelo		Italian	Tampa	Hillsborough	Florida	September 1910	Complicity in a shooting	
Ficarotta, Castenge		Italian	Tampa	Hillsborough	Florida	September 1910	Complicity in a shooting	
Richardson, Grant		African American	Centreville	Bibb	Alabama	October 12, 1910	Rape	Shot
Rodriguez, Antonio	20	Latino	Rocksprings	Edwards	Texas	November 3, 1910	Accused of murdering White Texan	Antonio Rodriguez was a 20 year old migrant worker from Mexico. On November 2, Antonio was accused of murdering a White Texan, which led to him getting arrested and jailed. On November 3, 1910, a mob took him from his jail cell and burned him alive.
Unknown		African American	Andalusia	Covington	Alabama	1911		Postcard of victim, postmarked 1911, appeared in Crisis Magazine January 1912 p. 118
Marshall, Eugene		African American	Shelbyville	Shelby	Kentucky	January 16, 1911	Convicted of murdering an aged negro woman	Three men (Eugene Marshall, Wade Patterson, James West) lynched at the same time after the mob broke into jail after threatening the jailor for the keys. All three were hanged from the Chesapeake and Ohio bridge. One rope for two men (Patterson and West) was used, which snapped. Afterward, they were shot multiple times.
Patterson, Wade		African American	Shelbyville	Shelby	Kentucky	January 16, 1911	Charged with detaining Miss Elizabeth Rubel, a white nineteen-year old Shelbyville girl	Three men (Eugene Marshall, Wade Patterson, James West) lynched at the same time after the mob broke into jail after threatening the jailor for the keys. All three were hanged from the Chesapeake and Ohio bridge. One rope for two men (Patterson and West) was used, which snapped. Afterward, they were shot multiple times.
West, James		African American	Shelbyville	Shelby	Kentucky	January 16, 1911	Charged with detaining Miss Mary Coley, a young white girl.	Three men (Eugene Marshall, Wade Patterson, James West) lynched at the same time after the mob broke into jail after threatening the jailor for the keys. All three were hanged from the Chesapeake and Ohio bridge. One rope for two men (Patterson and West) was used, which snapped. Afterward, they were shot multiple times.
Porter, Will		African American	Livermore	McLean	Kentucky	April 20, 1911	Shooting a white man	Shot in an opera house
Nelson, Laura	33	African American	Okemah	Okfuskee	Oklahoma	May 25, 1911	Killing of Deputy Sheriff George H. Loney	Gang raped and lynched together with her son, 14, after trying to protect him during a meat-pilfering investigation.
Nelson, L.D.	14	African American	Okemah	Okfuskee	Oklahoma	May 25, 1911	Killing of Deputy Sheriff George H. Loney	Gang raped and lynched together with her son, 14, after trying to protect him during a meat-pilfering investigation.
Bradford, William		African American	Chunky	Newton	Mississippi	June 16, 1911	Accused of attempted murder of two white farmers	
Gomez, Antonio	14	Latino	Thorndale	Milam	Texas	June 19, 1911	Killing a German man	After trying to escape a mob that surrounded the 14-year-old boy, he ended up killing a German man named Charles Zieschang which led to the 14 year old's arrest. While being transported to the jailhouse, four men intercepted the two people taking Antonio and successfully lynched Antonio Gomez.
Jones, Commodore	26	African American	Farmersville	Collin	Texas	August 11, 1911	Accused of insulting a white woman over the telephone.	Crowd of around 75 men and boys gained access to Jones's cell and marched him to the outskirts of town, where he was forced to climb a telephone pole and was hanged.
Lee, John		African American	Durant	Bryan	Oklahoma	August 12, 1911	Attempted murder and rape of a white woman (the victim later died from her injuries)	Picture of victim appeared in Crisis Magazine January 1912 p. 122: Shot and burned.
Walker, Zachariah	20–24	African American	Coatesville	Chester	Pennsylvania	August 16, 1911	Killing of a police officer, possibly in self-defense	Taken from hospital room and burned alive. Fifteen men and teenage boys were indicted, but all were acquitted at trials.
Harrison, Ernest		African American	Wickliffe	Ballard	Kentucky	September 11, 1911	Robbery and murder of an elderly black man	The three men were accused of the robbery and murder of Washington Thomas, an elderly black man.
Reed, Sam		African American	Wickliffe	Ballard	Kentucky	September 11, 1911	Robbery and murder of an elderly black man	The three men were accused of the robbery and murder of Washington Thomas, an elderly black man.
Howard, Frank		African American	Wickliffe	Ballard	Kentucky	September 11, 1911	Robbery and murder of an elderly black man	The three men were accused of the robbery and murder of Washington Thomas, an elderly black man.
2 Unknown men		African American				Prior to December 1911		Picture of victims appeared in Crisis Magazine twice; first, a cropped picture of one victim in December 1911 in article "Jesus Christ in Georgia" (p. 70) and a full picture of both victims in January 1912 p. 122
Pettigrew, Ben	40s	African American	Decaturville	Decatur	Tennessee	December 5, 1911	Jealousy over victim's respectability and financial success	Shot, hanged, and their bodies burned by four men. The four killers were caught at the scene and chased by a posse, but only two men, John Bailey and George Shelton, were captured. Bailey and Shelton were convicted of first degree murder, sentenced to death, and executed by hanging on July 26, 1912. Prior to his execution, Bailey named Lige Scott and Grover Hardcastle as the other two killers and said Scott was the ringleader. Hardcastle was never found and charges against Scott were dropped due to insufficient evidence.
Petttigrew, Fred	13	African American	Decaturville	Decatur	Tennessee	December 5, 1911	Jealousy over victim's respectability and financial success	
Pettigrew, Pearl	12	African American	Decaturville	Decatur	Tennessee	December 5, 1911	Jealousy over victim's respectability and financial success	
Johnson, King	28	African American	Brooklyn	Anne Arundel	Maryland	December 26, 1911	Alleged murder of Frederick Schwab.	Johnson was to be transported to Annapolis for his safety that same day, but those plans were delayed. Around two o'clock in the morning on December 26, 1911, a mob broke into the unguarded jail where Johnson was kept. When Johnson fought back preventing a noose from being placed on his neck, he was beaten with irons and shot.
Lewis, Sanford		African American	Fort Smith	Sebastian	Arkansas	1912	Shooting a constable	Five policemen fined $100 each for "nonfeasance of office". Eleven police officers, including the police chief, were fired. Mayor voted out. Man charged with lynching acquitted.
Unknown		African American			Florida(?)	Prior to February 3, 1912		Picture of victim appeared in Crisis Magazine March 1912 p. 209:[card purchased 3 Feb 1912 in Palm Beach Florida]
Davis, Dan	25	African American	Tyler	Smith	Texas	1912	Assault and rape of a 16 year old white girl	Burned alive by a mob
Edwards, Rob		African American	Cumming	Forsyth	Georgia	September 1912	Alleged murder of 18-year-old woman	Taken out of his jail cell by an armed mob; hanged and shot.
Johnson, Walter		African American	Princeton	Mercer	West Virginia	September 4, 1912	Assault and rape of a 14-year-old girl	Taken out of his jail cell by an armed mob; hanged and shot.
9 Mexicans		Latino	El Paso	El Paso	Texas	1913	Being Mexican bandits	Hanged
Delgadillio, Demecio	28	Latino	Albuquerque	Bernalillo	New Mexico	1913	Murder	Demecio killed Mrs. Soledad Zarrazino De Pino in a fit of jealous which led to him being hanged in Bernalillo County Jail
White, Henry		African American	Campville	Alachua	Florida	1913	Found under white woman's bed	Hanged, noose broke, shot.
Williams, Andrew	35	African American	Houston	Chickasaw	Mississippi	1913	Murder of John C. Williams, Wife of the Deputy Chancery Clerk	Dragged from jail and hanged at a nearby tree, upon the alleged statement of two African-American women; the women who made the statement were arrested the next day for making a false statement, according to one source and/or disappeared. The day after Williams was lynched, a second African American, named in different reports as 'Divel Rucker', 'Dizell Rucker' and 'Dibrell Tucker; was lynched and burned at the stake on the assumption that he, not Williams, was the actual murderer
Rucker, Divel	20	African American	Houston	Chickasaw	Mississippi	1913	Murder of John C. Williams, Wife of the Deputy Chancery Clerk	The day after Andrew Williams was lynched by hanging for this murder, Rucker was presumed by the mob to be the actual murderer and, allegedly, confessed to the crime. He was tied to an iron stake, covered with tar, and set afire. The family of the victim shot him as he was burning According to the New York Sun report, "The Rucker lynching was the most spectacular in the history of Mississippi and there was no attempt at concealment or evasion."
Green, Joe	16	African American	Heath	Covington	Alabama	February 25, 1913	Fatal shooting of Nobie Spicer	Shot and killed by a mob led by the victim's husband who identified Green as the murderer. Samuel Spicer Jr. would later be convicted of the murder of his wife, Nobie, and sentenced to life in prison. He was paroled in December 1929, but then fled.
Collins, J.C.	about 34	African American	Mondak	Roosevelt	Montana	April 4, 1913	Murder of Sheridan County Sheriff Thomas Courtney and a deputized citizen	Hanged from a telephone pole
Simmons, Bennie/Dennis		African American	Anadarko	Caddo	Oklahoma	June 13, 1913	Killing a 16-year-old girl	Taken from officers; was lynched and burned
Richardson, Joseph		African American	Leitchfield	Grayson	Kentucky	September 26, 1913	Assaulting a white girl	Town drunk who accidentally stumbled near girl; hanged
Padilla, Adolfo		Latino	Santa Fe	Santa Fe	New Mexico	1914	Accused of killing his wife	A mob of masked men seized Padilla from the jail and chopped his body into pieces.
Shields, Dallas		African American	Fayette	Howard	Missouri	March 17, 1914	Murdering a police officer	
Turner, Allen	47	African American	Western area of Parish (county)	Union	Louisiana	March 29, 1914	Accused of assaulting a white man (J.P. McDougall)	J.P. McDougall was whipping Allen Turner's son. Allen was defending his son. Taken from deputy sheriff and shot to death. It is said that Allen's body was then dragged through the roads of Spearsville.
Varner, Lee	17	White	Clarksville	Montgomery	Tennessee	July 25, 1914	Rape of a 12-year-old black girl	Chased down and shot by African American mob. The girl's uncle, Wash Langford, confessed to murdering Varner, but was freed after a grand jury deemed his actions justifiable.
Sullivan, Fred		African American	Byhalia	Marshall	Mississippi	November 25, 1914	Alleged barn burning.	Fred Sullivan and his wife Jane confessed after nooses were placed around their necks. The couple were hanged by a mob of more than 100.
Sullivan, Jane		African American	Byhalia	Marshall	Mississippi	November 25, 1914	Alleged barn burning.	Fred Sullivan and his wife Jane confessed after nooses were placed around their necks. The couple were hanged by a mob of more than 100.
Gonzales, Isidro		Latino	Oakville	Live Oak	Texas	December 20, 1914	Murder of a county jailer	Isidro was accused choking Harry Hinton to death and escaped from jail. He was found riddled with bullets after his escape.
Unidentified man		African American	Cedarbluff	Oktibbeha	Mississippi	1915	Entering the room of a white woman	
11 Mexican-Americans		Latino	Lyford	Willacy	Texas	1915	Supposedly were Mexican Bandits	After hearing news of Luis De La Rose had been killed in battle, Sheriff Vann went to Mission, Texas to see if the news was true, on the way, American troops found the bodies of 11 Mexicans. Commander Blocksom ordered an investigation to investigate the killings. He believed that the Mexicans were not Bandits and were peaceful Mexicans who were killed due to race hatred after the Progreso battle.
Sheffield, Caesar	17	African American	Lake Park	Lowndes	Georgia	April 17, 1915	Allegedly stealing meat from a smokehouse owned by a white man.	Jailors abandoned the jail allowing a mob to take Caesar Sheffield to a field where they shot him multiple times and left his body.
Leon, José		Latino	Southern Arizona	Pima	Arizona	April 19, 1915	Outlawry	Two white police officers interrogated the brothers and accused them of being outlaws. They hanged the brothers from a tree and left their bodies to rot in the desert gulch.
Leon, Hilario		Latino	Southern Arizona	Pima	Arizona	April 19, 1915	Outlawry	Two white police officers interrogated the brothers and accused them of being outlaws. They hanged the brothers from a tree and left their bodies to rot in the desert gulch.
Ward, Benjamin E.	37	White	Norman	Cleveland	Oklahoma	May 9, 1915	Murdering his wife	Mob expected him to be freed on grounds of insanity.
Green, Alonzo		African American		Jones	Georgia	July 4, 1915	Mob ran into them while hunting for the murderer of white farmer	
Green, James D.	14	African American		Jones	Georgia	July 4, 1915	Mob ran into them while hunting for the murderer of white farmer	
Bostick, William		African American		Jones	Georgia	July 4, 1915	Mob ran into them while hunting for the murderer of white farmer	
Manriquez, Lorenzo		Latino	Mercedes	Hidalgo	Texas	July 23–24, 1915	Resisting arrest	Shot
Manriquez, Gorgonio		Latino	Mercedes	Hidalgo	Texas	July 23–24, 1915	Resisting arrest	Shot
Muñóz, Adolfo		Latino	Brownsville	Cameron	Texas	July 28, 1915	Murder and horse theft	While being transported by Sheriff Frank Carr, a group of seven to eight men held the Sheriff at gun point, taking Adolfo and later hanging him from a tree.
Stanley, Will		African American	Temple	Bell	Texas	July 29–30, 1915	Murder of 3 children and assaulting parents	Lynched and burned. Stanley Claimed to have been accessory to murders and claimed leader of mob had hired him and other 2 men
Frank, Leo	31	Jewish	Marietta	Cobb	Georgia	August 17, 1915	Killing a 13-year-old girl	No charges filed; posthumously pardoned.
Six Mexicans		Latino	Brownsville	Cameron	Texas	August 18, 1915	Murder	Two of the Mexicans were taken from San Benito jail and the other four Mexicans were taken from Mercedes where they shot to death and bodies burned on the side of a road.
Five Mexicans	33, others unknown	Latino	South Texas	Culberson	Texas	August 30, 1915	Horse theft	Pascual Orozco successfully executed a planned escape to Sierra Blanca where he met up with leaders and future cabinet members where they crossed into Dick Love's ranch who accused them of stealing his horses and later got the Rangers and other law enforcement to look for the men where they found the men camping in a box canyon where they killed all 5 of the men.
Bazán, Jesus	67	Latino		Hidalgo	Texas	September 27, 1915	No accusation	Jesus and Antonio went to report that a few of their horses had been stolen to the Texas Rangers. After they reported that stuff to the Rangers and left, Ranger Henry Ransom followed Jesus and Antonio and shot both of them dead. Henry Ransom had called for the bodies to be left in the open to spread fear across the town.
Longoria, Antonio	49	Latino		Hidalgo	Texas	September 27, 1915	No accusation	Jesus and Antonio went to report that a few of their horses had been stolen to the Texas Rangers. After they reported that stuff to the Rangers and left, Ranger Henry Ransom followed Jesus and Antonio and shot both of them dead. Henry Ransom had called for the bodies to be left in the open to spread fear across the town.
10 Mexican-Americans		Latino	Olmito	Cameron	Texas	October 19, 1915	Train wrecking and murder	After a train wrecking that killed 3 people, the Americans began to hang or shoot Mexicans who they thought were involved in the wreck
Stevenson, Cordella		African American	Columbus	Lowndes	Mississippi	December 15, 1915	Her son was accused of burning a white man's barn, he was unavailable, so they raped and murdered her	Her husband Arch was never seen alive after December 15
Brown, Jeff		African American	Cedarbluff	Oktibbeha	Mississippi	1916	Bumping into a white girl at a train station	Pictures of his lynching were sold to white citizens for five cents each.
Lang, Ed		African American	Rice	Navarro	Texas	1916	"Attacking a young woman."	Taken from a sheriff's posse and hanged.
Richards, John		African American	Goldsboro	Wayne	North Carolina	January 12, 1916	murder	Taken from jail and lynched
Semore, Bodius (other spellings: Semore, Rodius; Leamon, Rodium)		African American		Lee and Worth	Georgia	January 20, 1916	Suspicion of murder of a sheriff	Taken from Worth county jail and lynched by a mob from Lee county.
Lake, Felix		African American		Lee and Worth	Georgia	January 20, 1916	Suspicion of murder of a sheriff	Taken from Worth county jail and lynched by a mob from Lee county.
Lake, Frank		African American		Lee and Worth	Georgia	January 20, 1916	Suspicion of murder of a sheriff	Taken from Worth county jail and lynched by a mob from Lee county.
Lake, Dewey		African American		Lee and Worth	Georgia	January 20, 1916	Suspicion of murder of a sheriff	Taken from Worth county jail and lynched by a mob from Lee county.
Lake, Major		African American		Lee and Worth	Georgia	January 20, 1916	Suspicion of murder of a sheriff	Taken from Worth county jail and lynched by a mob from Lee county.
Black, Joseph	54	African American		Greene	North Carolina	April 5, 1916	Smuggling weapons to his 14-year-old son, Willie Black, in jail	Taken from jail and shot. Willie Black, who had been awaiting trial for beating raping a 6-year-old white girl, was later convicted of rape, sentenced to death, and executed by electrocution on July 21, 1916. He was the youngest person executed in North Carolina in the 20th century.
Washington, Jesse	17	African American	Waco	McLennan	Texas	May 15, 1916	Rape and murder of a white woman (the rape accusation was false)	After being convicted of murder and sentenced to death, Washington was dragged behind car, castrated, had his fingers and ear cut off and was burned alive. Professionally photographed; pictures sold as postcards. Lynching of "political value" to Sheriff and to the judge who presided over his trial. "On the way to the scene of the burning, people on every hand took a hand in showing their feelings in the matter by striking the Negro with anything obtainable, some struck him with shovels, bricks, clubs and others stabbed him and cut him until when he was strung up his body was a solid color of red."
Buenrostro, Jose	25	Latino	Brownsville	Cameron	Texas	May 19, 1916	Murder of A. L. Austin and Charles Austin	The 2 Mexican men were accused of having killed A. L. Austin and his son in raids the fall of 1915, they were hanged in Cameron County Jail
Chapa, Melquiades	20–23	Latino	Brownsville	Cameron	Texas	May 19, 1916	Murder of A. L. Austin and Charles Austin	The 2 Mexican men were accused of having killed A. L. Austin and his son in raids the fall of 1915, they were hanged in Cameron County Jail
Hoskins, Silas		African American	Elaine	Phillips	Arkansas	Summer of 1916		"Vanished"; believed to have been killed because a white man coveted his successful saloon business. Uncle of author Richard Wright.
Lerma, Geronimo	18	Latino	Brownwood	Brown	Texas	June 20, 1916	Rape of a white woman	Geronimo was suspected to have assaulted one of the white woman in the town which led to him being shot and left dead.
Baskins, Rev. Josh J.	Adults	African American	Newberry	Alachua	Florida	August 18, 1916	Helping a man who had shot and killed a constable	James Dennis was shot. The others were hanged. Mary Dennis had two children and was pregnant. Stella Young had four children.
Dennis, Bert	Adults	African American	Newberry	Alachua	Florida	August 18, 1916	Helping a man who had shot and killed a constable	James Dennis was shot. The others were hanged. Mary Dennis had two children and was pregnant. Stella Young had four children.
Dennis, James	Adults	African American	Newberry	Alachua	Florida	August 18, 1916	Helping a man who had shot and killed a constable	James Dennis was shot. The others were hanged. Mary Dennis had two children and was pregnant. Stella Young had four children.
Dennis, Mary	Adults	African American	Newberry	Alachua	Florida	August 18, 1916	Helping a man who had shot and killed a constable	James Dennis was shot. The others were hanged. Mary Dennis had two children and was pregnant. Stella Young had four children.
McHenry, Andrew	Adults	African American	Newberry	Alachua	Florida	August 18, 1916	Helping a man who had shot and killed a constable	James Dennis was shot. The others were hanged. Mary Dennis had two children and was pregnant. Stella Young had four children.
Young, Stella	Adults	African American	Newberry	Alachua	Florida	August 18, 1916	Helping a man who had shot and killed a constable	James Dennis was shot. The others were hanged. Mary Dennis had two children and was pregnant. Stella Young had four children.
Crawford, Anthony	51	African American	Abbeville	Abbeville	South Carolina	October 21, 1916	Offensive language	Coroner's jury: "persons unknown"
Boleta, Paulo		Italian	Greenwich Village	New York City	New York	December 14, 1916	Mass shooting	Randomly fired a revolver on a crowded street, wounding a bystander. Chased down by mob of 500 men and boys. Beaten and trampled to death.
Daley, Starr	26	White		Pinal	Arizona	May 6, 1917	Homicide (Two murders) plus two rapes	Accused admitted guilt in trial; taken from sheriff en route to jail and hanged from a telephone pole; last lynching in Arizona
Persons, Ell	about 50	African American	Memphis	Shelby	Tennessee	May 22, 1917	Rape and murder of a white girl	No charges filed.
Clark, Scott		African American	East St. Louis	St. Clair	Illinois	July 2, 1919	None (killed during the East St. Louis massacre)	Grabbed, had a noose fastened around his neck, and dragged through the street. He died from his injuries four days later. Herbert Wood, 40, and Leo Keane, 17, were both convicted of murder sentenced to 14 years in prison.
Scott, Lation	32	African American	Dyer	Dyer	Tennessee	December 2, 1917	Rape of a white woman	Scott was tortured for 3.5 hours and then burned alive by an angry mob on Sunday December 2, 1917.
15 Mexican Americans	15–50	Latino	Porvenir	Presidio	Texas	1918	Accused of stealing and ambushing Texas Rangers	January 28, 1918, Texas Rangers enter Porvenir and took 15 Mexican American boys and men away from the town and executed all 15 by gun shot
4 Mexicans		Latino	Douglas	Cochise	Arizona	1918	Robbery and murder	Seized from homes and hanged
McIlherron, Jim		African American	Estill Springs	Franklin	Tennessee	February 12, 1918	Murders of two white people	Tortured, then burned alive. Spectators came from as far as 50 miles away.
Prager, Robert	30	White (German-American)	Collinsville	Madison	Illinois	April 5, 1918	Socialist; sympathy to Germany during World War I	Forced to sing patriotic songs and kiss the flag, before being hanged.
García, Florencio	33	Latino	Port Isabel	Cameron	Texas	April 5, 1918	Robbery	Two rangers had taken Garcia into custody for a theft investigation. The next day they let Garcia go, and were last seen escorting him on a mule. Garcia was never seen again. A month after the interrogation, bones and Garcia's clothing were found beside the road where the Rangers claimed to have let Garcia go. The Rangers were arrested for murder, freed on bail, and acquitted due to lack of evidence.
Turner, Hayes	25	African American	Morven	Brooks	Georgia	May 18, 1918	Accused of helping kill an abusive landowner.	Wife Mary killed next day for defending him.
Turner, Mary	18	African American		Bridge joining Brooks and Lowndes	Georgia	May 19, 1918	Publicly opposed and threatened legal action against white people who had murdered her husband, unfairly accused (according to her) of killing an abusive landowner.	Hanged upside down from a tree, doused her in gasoline and motor oil and set her on fire. Turner was still alive when a member of the mob split her abdomen open with a knife and her unborn child fell on the ground. The baby was stomped and crushed as it fell to the ground. Turner's body was riddled with hundreds of bullets.
Thompson, Allie		African American	Culpeper	Culpeper	Virginia	1918	Assault	
Kinkkonen, Olli	38	White (Finnish-American)	Duluth	St. Louis County	Minnesota	September 18, 1918	Refusal to join the military during World War I	Tarred and feathered before being hanged.
Taylor, George		African American	Rolesville	Wake	North Carolina	November 5, 1918	Rape of a white woman	No charges were filed. There is a Web site on this lynching.
Woodson, Edward		African American	Green River	Sweatwater	Wyoming	December 10, 1918	Murder of a white man	Hanged in railroad terminal.
Clark, Andrew	15	African American	Shubuta ("hanging bridge")	Clarke	Mississippi	December 20, 1918	Alleged murder of dentist	Dentist had affairs with both sisters, who were pregnant, likely with his child; the brothers had romantic interest in the girls. After the lynching the babies were seen squirming in their mothers' bellies.
Clark, Major	20	African American	Shubuta ("hanging bridge")	Clarke	Mississippi	December 20, 1918	Alleged murder of dentist	Dentist had affairs with both sisters, who were pregnant, likely with his child; the brothers had romantic interest in the girls. After the lynching the babies were seen squirming in their mothers' bellies.
Howze, Alma	16	African American	Shubuta ("hanging bridge")	Clarke	Mississippi	December 20, 1918	Alleged murder of dentist	Dentist had affairs with both sisters, who were pregnant, likely with his child; the brothers had romantic interest in the girls. After the lynching the babies were seen squirming in their mothers' bellies.
Howze, Maggie	20	African American	Shubuta ("hanging bridge")	Clarke	Mississippi	December 20, 1918	Alleged murder of dentist	Dentist had affairs with both sisters, who were pregnant, likely with his child; the brothers had romantic interest in the girls. After the lynching the babies were seen squirming in their mothers' bellies.
Ashley, Bob		African American	Dublin	Laurens	Georgia	1919	Hoped to shoot someone else	A group of men thought another man might be inside Ashley's house, so they shot into the house, mortally wounding Ashley.
Hamilton, Eugene		African American		Jasper	Georgia	1919	Convicted by all-white jury of attempting to shoot a white farmer; case before Georgia Court of Appeals.	Mob of 60 stopped car of sheriff who was driving him for protection to nearest large city, Macon. Driven to a bridge in Jasper County and shot to death. Governor was "livid".
Prince, Henry		African American	Hawkinsville	Pulaski	Georgia	1919	Unknown	
Waters, Jim		African American		Johnson	Georgia	1919	Rape accusation	Investigation closed in one hour with no witnesses interviewed.
Little, Wilbur		African American	Blakely	Early	Georgia	April 1919	Wearing uniform of his WWI military service to the United States	
Wilkins, Willie		African American	Perkins (near)	Jenkins	Georgia	April 13, 1919	Friend of man believed to have killed lawman.	
Ruffin, John		African American	Perkins (near)	Jenkins	Georgia	April 13, 1919	Son of man believed to have killed lawman.	
Ruffin, Henry		African American	Perkins (near)	Jenkins	Georgia	April 13, 1919	Son of man believed to have killed lawman.	
Mack, Daniel	24	African American		Worth	Georgia	April 14, 1919	Brushing up against a white man while walking	Beaten; survived by playing dead
Holden, George		African American	Monroe (near)	Ouachita	Louisiana	April 29, 1919	Writing a suggestive note to a white woman	Mob stopped a train, dragged him off, and shot him.
Richards, Benny		African American	Warrenton	Warren	Georgia	May 1, 1919	Accused of murdering his ex-wife and shooting 5 others	300 men lynched Richards, a farmer.
Clay, Lloyd		African American	Vicksburg	Warren	Mississippi	May 15, 1919	Attempted rape of a white woman	1000 men broke through three steel doors to abduct Clay from jail before hanging, shooting, and burning him. The victim later told the police that she was unsure if Clay had been her attacker.
Moore, Will		African American	Ten Mile	Stone	Mississippi	May 20, 1919	Shooting J.H. Rogers	Lynched
Livingston, Frank	25	African American	El Dorado	Union	Arkansas	May 21, 1919	False murder accusation	One of many returning WWI veterans lynched in 1919.
Washington, Berry	72	African American	Milan	Dodge and Telfair	Georgia	May 26, 1919	Defended black girls from white home invaders.	Many black homes burned to discourage citizens from coming forward
Lynch, Jay	28	White	Missouri	Barton	Missouri	May 28, 1919	Murder of a police officer and his son	Hanged by a mob after pleading guilty and being sentenced to life in prison. The lynching resulted in Missouri reinstating the death penalty, which had been abolished in 1917, to deter future lynchings.
Walters, Lemuel		African American	Longview	Gregg	Texas	June 17, 1919	Making "indecent advances" to a white woman	The report of the affair and the subsequent coverup led to the Longview riots.
Robinson, Robert	55	African American	Chicago	Cook	Illinois	June 23, 1919	None (white supremacists)	Robinson was an Army Reserve veteran. Part of the Chicago race riot of 1919.
Hartfield, John		African American	Ellisville	Jones	Mississippi	June 26, 1919	Assaulting a young white woman	"The biggest newspaper in the state, Jackson Daily News, carried headlines announcing the exact time and place of the coming orgy. Ten thousand people answered the paper's invitation and they were addressed by the District Attorney, T. W. Wilson, while the lynching was going on."
Jennings, Chilton	28	African American	Gilmer	Upshur County	Texas	July 24, 1919	Assaulted a white women, Mrs. Virgie Haggard	He was arrested and a mob of about 1,000 white people stormed the jail and broke down the door with sledgehammers. A noose was placed around his neck and he was dragged by horse to the town square where he was hanged. Four people were later arrested for the lynching, murder indictments were served for Willie Howell, Charlie Lansdale, Fritz Boyd, and Francis Flanagan.
Gorman, Samuel	17	African American	Darby	Delaware	Pennsylvania	July 23, 1919	Alleged murder	Attempted lynching
Harper, Elisha	25	African American	Newberry	Newberry	South Carolina	July 24, 1919	Insulting a 14-year-old girl	Attempted lynching
Williams, Eugene	17	African American	Chicago	Cook	Illinois	July 27, 1919	Racial unrest	A white officer refused to arrest the murderer, and instead arrested a black man who complained about it.
Cox, Obe		African American		Oglethorpe	Georgia	September 10, 1919	Accused of murdering a white farmer's wife	Taken to the scene of the crime, his body riddled with bullets and burned at the stake. Several thousand persons witnessed the scene. Controversial as the local Black community "thanked" the mob for just killing Cox and not attacking their community.
Gonzalez, Jose		Latino	Pueblo	Pueblo	Colorado	September 13, 1919	Killing patrolman	Accused of shooting and killing a patrolman Jeff Evans, which they were arrested and charged for. A mob broke into the jail captured and hanged from the girders of a bridge.
Ortez, Salvador		Latino	Pueblo	Pueblo	Colorado	September 13, 1919	Killing patrolman	Accused of shooting and killing a patrolman Jeff Evans, which they were arrested and charged for. A mob broke into the jail captured and hanged from the girders of a bridge.
Brown, William	41	African American	Omaha	Douglas	Nebraska	September 28, 1919	Rape	Part of the Omaha race riot of 1919
Phifer, Miles (or Relius)		African American	Montgomery	Montgomery	Alabama	September 29, 1919	Assault of a white woman	Was wearing military uniform
Crosky, Robert		African American	Montgomery	Montgomery	Alabama	September 29, 1919	Assault of a white woman	
Temple, Willie		African American	Montgomery	Montgomery	Alabama	September 30, 1919	Killing a police officer	
Jones, Paul		African American	Macon (near)	Bibb	Georgia	November 2, 1919	Assault of a white woman	Mob of 400 found him, refused to turn him over to sheriff's deputies. Soaked in gasoline, set on fire; shot while he burned. Hanged/shot/burned in railyard.
Jameson, Jordan	50	African American	Magnolia	Columbia	Arkansas	November 11, 1919	Killing a sheriff	Burned to death in the public square.
Everest, Wesley	28	White	Centralia	Lewis	Washington	November 11, 1919	Homicide	Hanged from a bridge during the Centralia Massacre labor conflict
Richardson, Allie/Halley	18	African American	Moberly	Randolph	Missouri	November 16, 1919	Assault and robbery of white farmer Edward Thompson	Attempted to hang all four men on one branch, which subsequently broke. Three escaped, one shot and was killed (unclear who).
Adams, George	18	African American	Moberly	Randolph	Missouri	November 16, 1919	Assault and robbery of white farmer Edward Thompson	Attempted to hang all four men on one branch, which subsequently broke. Three escaped, one shot and was killed (unclear who).
Taylor, Sanford	20	African American	Moberly	Randolph	Missouri	November 16, 1919	Assault and robbery of white farmer Edward Thompson	Attempted to hang all four men on one branch, which subsequently broke. Three escaped, one shot and was killed (unclear who).
Anderson, James		African American	Moberly	Randolph	Missouri	November 16, 1919	Assault and robbery of white farmer Edward Thompson	Attempted to hang all four men on one branch, which subsequently broke. Three escaped, one shot and was killed (unclear who).
Mosely, Sam		African American	Lake City	Columbia	Florida	November 29, 1919	Accused of assaulting a white woman.	

=== 1920–1929 ===
Name	Age	Ethnicity	City	County/Parish	State	Date	Accusation	Comment
Scott, Henry		African American	Bartow	Polk	Florida	1920	Asking a white woman to wait until he had prepared another woman's train berth	Shot
Clayton, Elias	18–19	African American	Duluth	St. Louis	Minnesota	June 15, 1920	Rape of a teenage girl	Taken from jail by mob, given mock trials, beaten and hanged from light-post. Three members of the mob received prison terms of up to 5 years for rioting, albeit none of them were convicted of murder.
Jackson, Elmer	23	African American	Duluth	St. Louis	Minnesota	June 15, 1920	Rape of a teenage girl	Taken from jail by mob, given mock trials, beaten and hanged from light-post. Three members of the mob received prison terms of up to 5 years for rioting, albeit none of them were convicted of murder.
McGhie, Isaac	19–20	African American	Duluth	St. Louis	Minnesota	June 15, 1920	Rape of a teenage girl	Taken from jail by mob, given mock trials, beaten and hanged from light-post. Three members of the mob received prison terms of up to 5 years for rioting, albeit none of them were convicted of murder.
Gathers, Phillip		African American		Effingham	Georgia	June 21, 1920	Rape and murder of a 17-year-old white girl	Shot, burned, and hanged
Arthur, Irving	19	African American	Paris	Lamar	Texas	July 6, 1920	Killed two white men in self-defense	Pulled from jail and burned alive. The 20-year-old, 17-year-old, and 14-year-old sisters of the brothers were also gang raped.
Arthur, Herman	28	African American	Paris	Lamar	Texas	July 6, 1920	Killed two white men in self-defense	Pulled from jail and burned alive. The 20-year-old, 17-year-old, and 14-year-old sisters of the brothers were also gang raped.
Roach, Edward "Red"	25	African American	Roxboro	Person	North Carolina	July 7, 1920	Rape of a 13-year-old white girl	Shot to death, then hanged. It was later revealed that Roach had been at work at the time of the rape.
Daniels, Lige	16	African American	Center	Shelby	Texas	August 3, 1920	Murder of a white woman	Taken from jail by a mob of approximately 1,000 to the town square and hanged
Belton, Roy	18	White	Tulsa	Tulsa	Oklahoma	August 28, 1920	Robbery and murder of a white taxi driver	Taken from jail and hanged from a tree.
Perry, Julius "July"	52	African American	Ocoee	Orange	Florida	November 3, 1920	Sign on body: "This is what we do to niggers that vote."	Prosperous black farmer.
Hurst, Dave	25	African American	Kent Junction	Wise	Virginia	November 14, 1920	Attempted rape of a 60-year-old white woman	Hanged and shot
Brown, Coleman		African American	Purvis	Lamar	Mississippi	December 23, 1920	Murder of a 14-year-old black girl	Brown, a preacher, was hanged from a tree by an African American mob.
Thomas, Wade		African American	Jonesboro	Craighead	Arkansas	December 26, 1920	Murder of a police officer	Taken from jail by a mob, hanged from a telegraph pole, then riddled with bullets.
Lowry, Henry		African American	Nodena	Mississippi	Arkansas	1921	Asked for his wages	Burned to death; crowd of 500
Baird, William Roosevelt	21	White	Nauvoo	Walker	Alabama	January 13, 1921	Union activity; killing a Alabama National Guard soldier in self-defense	Dragged by automobile, beaten, left for dead tied to a tree in front of Slick Lizard Mine
Tuggles, Brownie	28	African American	Hope	Hempstead	Arkansas	March 15, 1921	Rape of an elderly white woman	
Eley, Jesse	46	African American	Murfreesboro	Hertford	North Carolina	June 20, 1921	Owned a 50-acre farm which caused jealousy from some white neighbors.	Jesse Eley was returning from the market in Murfreesboro, North Carolina. He bought some grain for his cattle. He had two workers riding with him in his horse-drawn wagon. As he reached the outskirts of town, he entered a path that went into a wooded area. Several men were hiding in the woods entrance waiting for him. As his wagon entered the woods, the men stopped Jesse. They began beating him and eventually hanged him on a tree. Jesse's workers took off running. One of them ran back to Jesse's farm to let the family know what was happening. The family got a horse-drawn buggy and went to rescue him. By the time they got there, Jesse was barely alive. They found him because he raised one of his legs in the air to let them know where he was. Jesse had a hole in his head, and his stomach was cut open. His throat was seizing up because of the hanging. As they put him into the buggy, he died.
Daniel, Eugene	16	African American	Pittsboro	Chatham	North Carolina	September 18, 1921	Walking into a white girl's bedroom	Hanged from a tree with tire chains, shot
Turner, William	18	African American	Helena	Phillips	Arkansas	November 18, 1921	Alleged assault of 15-year-old white girl	Shot, dragged to the park, doused in gasoline and lit on fire
Cade, Henry	25	African American	Sour Lake	Hardin	Texas	November 26, 1921	Rape of an 8 year old white girl	Taken from jail and hanged by a mob
Rouse, Fred	33	African American	Fort Worth	Tarrant	Texas	December 11, 1921	Shot two white men	While hired as a strikebreaker for a whites-only union, he was attacked and shot two union protesters.
Hackney, Curley	30	White	Waco	McLennan	Texas	December 13, 1921	Rape of an 8-year-old white girl	Taken from jail and hanged by a mob.
Cabeza, Manuel	34	White (Canarian)	Key West	Monroe	Florida	December 25, 1921	Being in an interracial relationship	Shot a man who tarred and feathered him (because of his common law marriage); lynched by Ku Klux Klan.
McAllister, Bill		African American	Near the border of Williamsburg and Florence Counties	Florence	South Carolina	January 8, 1922	Being in an interracial relationship	Bill McAllister was killed by gunshot. The news of this lynching did not reach the national media until January 8, 1922, and so it is recorded as the first lynching of 1922 in America. The United States Senate Committee on the Judiciary recorded five lynching incidents recorded in December 1921, none of which in South Carolina.
Jenkins, Willie Lee		African American	Eufaula	Barbour	Alabama	January 10, 1922	Dispute with his boss' wife. Newspapers reported that he "insulted a white woman."	Shot
Brooks, Jake		African American	Oklahoma City	Oklahoma	Oklahoma	January 14, 1922	Working as a strike breaker	Hanged by militant strikers. Five men, two of whom were black, pleaded guilty to first degree murder and were sentenced to life in prison.
Strong, Charles		African American	Mayo	Lafayette	Florida	January 17, 1922	Participated in a shooting that killed mailman W.R. Taylor	Hanged
Bell, William Arthur	20	African American		Pontotoc	Mississippi	January 29, 1922	Rape of an elderly white woman	Shot
Conner/Connor, Drew	22–23	White	Bolinger	Choctaw	Alabama	January 28, 1922	Unknown	A charred body of a white man was discovered on January 28, 1922, by H.T. Raines. Investigators determined that he was burned a few weeks earlier. The body was strung between two trees and a large pile of wood was piled around him. It was reported that the body was most likely Drew Connor who went missing Christmas 1921 but the only clues to the identity were some overall buttons found in the ash.
Thrasher, Will		African American	Crystal Springs	Copiah	Mississippi	February 1, 1922	Assault of a white woman	Hanged
Harrison, John (or Harry Harrison)	38	African American	Malvern	Hot Spring	Arkansas	February 2, 1922	Harassing white women	Shot
Duarte, Manuel		Hispanic		Cameron	Texas	February 2, 1922	Refused to leave farm	Shot for not leaving the farm where he worked
Norman, P.		African American	Texarkana	Miller	Arkansas	February 11, 1922	Forced a deputy to drive at gunpoint	Pulled from a car and shot four times by masked men.
Jones, Will	28	African American	Ellaville	Schley	Georgia	February 13, 1922	Disputed: Either Jones was going to report on the bootlegging that was going on in the area or that Will Jones came to the defence of 26-year-old African-American man Floyd Flournoy who had insulted Jessie Mae Devane, by asking for a ride in her buggy.	Shot
Baker, William	18	African American	Aberdeen	Monroe	Mississippi	March 8, 1922	Assault on white girl	Hanged
Culpepper, Brown		White	Holly Grove	Franklin	Louisiana	March 11, 1922	Unknown	A party of unmasked men came to the house he was staying at; when they did not find him, they went to the house of J.R. Hutto where Culpepper was visiting. They called for him to come out but when he didn't, they stormed into the house and shot Culpepper dead. Sheriff Jesse Gilbert of Winnsboro arrested eight suspected members of the Ku Klux Klan for involvement in the murder: P. M. Usery Sr., Albert Farrington, P. M. Usery Jr., J. C. Farrington, Charley Parson, George Wactor, Charlie Calendor and Eugene Bradshaw.
Williams, Alfred		African American	Harlem	Columbia	Georgia	March 12, 1922	Assault of a white farmer	Shot and wounded L.O. Anderson, a white farmer. Anderson recovered from his wounds.
Tompkins, George	19	African American	Indianapolis	Marion	Indiana	March 16, 1922	No accusation made	Hanged from a tree.
Ingram, Jerry		African American	Crawford	Lowndes	Mississippi	March 17, 1922	Assault on white woman	The wife of a popular farmer, Mrs Dewey, was attacked. She was able to yell for help and the attacker fled. Bloodhounds found a man, Jerry Ingram, 8 miles (13 km) from the scene of the attack and he was lynched.
Unidentified Man		White	Okay	Wagoner	Oklahoma	March 19, 1922		Body of a man chained/tied to a tree was discovered in the Arkansas River near Okay, Oklahoma. He was wearing clothes of "an excellent grade" and had a handkerchief with the initial "B".
Smith, Alex	60	African American	Gulfport	Harrison	Mississippi	March 22, 1922	Ran "a house of ill fame"	Hanged
Curry, McKinley	23	African American	Kirvin	Freestone	Texas	May 6, 1922	Murder of white, 17-year-old Eula Ausley	The two white men, Claude and Audey Prowell, who were initially arrested, were released and the sheriff released a statement that they were not involved in the murder of Eula Ausley. Author Monte Akers concluded that McKinley "Snap" Curry conspired with Claude and Audey Prowell to kill Eula Ausley and that Mose Jones and Johnny Cornish were innocent.
Cornish, Johnny (or H. Varney)	19	African American	Kirvin	Freestone	Texas	May 6, 1922	Murder of white, 17-year-old Eula Ausley	The two white men, Claude and Audey Prowell, who were initially arrested, were released and the sheriff released a statement that they were not involved in the murder of Eula Ausley. Author Monte Akers concluded that McKinley "Snap" Curry conspired with Claude and Audey Prowell to kill Eula Ausley and that Mose Jones and Johnny Cornish were innocent.
Jones, Mose	46	African American	Kirvin	Freestone	Texas	May 6, 1922	Murder of white, 17-year-old Eula Ausley	The two white men, Claude and Audey Prowell, who were initially arrested, were released and the sheriff released a statement that they were not involved in the murder of Eula Ausley. Author Monte Akers concluded that McKinley "Snap" Curry conspired with Claude and Audey Prowell to kill Eula Ausley and that Mose Jones and Johnny Cornish were innocent.
Cornish, Tom		African American	Kirvin	Freestone	Texas	May 8, 1922	Murder of white, 17-year-old Eula Ausley	The two white men, Claude and Audey Prowell, who were initially arrested, were released and the sheriff released a statement that they were not involved in the murder of Eula Ausley. Author Monte Akers concluded that McKinley "Snap" Curry conspired with Claude and Audey Prowell to kill Eula Ausley and that Mose Jones and Johnny Cornish were innocent.
Early, Thomas (aka Thomas Early, Jim Earlie)	25	African American	Plantersville	Grimes	Texas	May 17, 1922	Assault of white woman	Burned
Atkins, Charles	15	African American	Davisboro	Washington	Georgia	May 18, 1922	Murder of white woman	Burned
Owens, Hullen		African American	Texarkana	Bowie	Texas	May 19, 1922	Murder	Hanged (body burned)
Winters, Joe	20	African American	Conroe	Montgomery	Texas	May 20, 1922	Assault of white 14-year-old	Burned
Bozier, Mose	60	African American	Alleyton	Colorado	Texas	May 20, 1922	Assault of a white woman	Hanged
Wilson, Gilbert		African American	Bryan	Brazos	Texas	May 23, 1922	Stealing cattle	Beaten to death
Thomas, Jesse	23	African American	Waco	McLennan	Texas	May 26, 1922	Rape of a white woman and murder of her companion	Shot and body burned. Thomas was later proven innocent, with the real perpetrator being serial killer Roy Mitchell.
Byrd, William		African American	Brentwood	Wayne	Georgia	May 28, 1922	Murder of a white man	Shot (body burned)
Collins, Robert		African American	Summit	Pike	Mississippi	June 20, 1922	Assault of a young white woman	Hanged
Lewis, Warren	17	African American	New Dacus	Montgomery	Texas	June 23, 1922	Assault of a white woman	Hanged
Harvey, James		African American	Lanes Bridge	Liberty	Georgia	July 1, 1922	Assault of employer's wife	Hanged
Jordan, Joe		African American	Lanes Bridge	Liberty	Georgia	July 1, 1922	Assault of employer's wife	Hanged
Tankard, Philip		African American	Belhaven	Beaufort	North Carolina	July 5, 1922	Rioting	Tankard was shot to death after riots following a July 4 celebration by J.F. Burrows who was deputized to help put down the riots.
Pemberton, Joe		African American	Benton	Bossier	Louisiana	July 7, 1922	Shot two black women	Joe Pemberton was in the Bossier Parish jail in Benton, Louisiana for shooting two black women. A white mob surrounded the jail, overpowered Deputy Sheriff J.A. Wilson, and took Pemberton. His body was later found hanging from a tree in Black Bayou swamp, 2 miles (3.2 km) from Benton.
Davis, Jake	62	African American		Miller	Georgia	July 14, 1922	Being in an interracial relationship	Hanged by white mob. After the event, the Miller County Liberal wrote that "hundreds of the citizens throughout the county regret this lynching. Many have said [Ethel Skittel] was guiltier than Jake."
Mack, Oscar	29	African American	Lake Jennie Jewel	Orange	Florida	July 19, 1922	Shooting death of two white men	According to contemporary sources, Mack was reported to be lynched. However, he was able to escape and died at 67-years-old in Ohio.
Anderson, William		African American	Moultrie	Colquitt	Georgia	July 24, 1922	Assaulting a white 15-year-old girl	Three men had seized William Anderson and chained him inside a car. While waiting to drop him off to the police outside the Moultrie, Georgia jail, an unknown man jumped in and sped off. Andersen's bullet-ridden body was later found a few miles away next to the Ellenton, Georgia Reedy Creek Baptist Church. The Colquit county grand Jury was called into special session to investigate the people behind the lynching but was quickly adjourned due to lack of evidence.
West, John	50	African American	Guernsey	Hempstead	Arkansas	July 28, 1922	Fight over West using a drinking cup	The newspaper The Little River News reported that West was probably shot and killed "after he flourished a pistol and threatened the men who intended only to whip him."
Harris, Gilbert	28	African American	Hot Springs	Garland	Arkansas	August 1, 1922	Killing of Maurice Connelly (insurance solicitor) in a burglary gone wrong	A white mob, some 500 strong, broke into the jail and seized Gilbert Harris after overpowering the police in the public square (actually a triangle shape in front of the Como hotel). Even though Harris had a history of break and enters, he professed his innocence. The mob later took the corpse back and laid it in the jail.
Glover, John	35	African American	Holton	Bibb County	Georgia	August 2, 1922	Manslaughter of Deputy Sheriff Walter C. Byrd	Beaten, tied to a tree, riddled with bullets and lit on fire. Corpse was displayed in the Black community of Macon.
Blackwell, Bayner		African American	Swansboro	Onslow	North Carolina	August 6, 1922	Murder of Cy Jones	Onslow Sheriff claims Blackwell wasn't lynched, rather run out of town. The United States Senate Committee on the Judiciary report claims he was shot.
Steelman, John	35	African American	Lambert	Quitman	Mississippi	August 23, 1922	Assault on a white woman, Mrs. Bruce White	Mr. Bruce White had hired Steelman for some work. White and Steelman ate breakfast at White's house and then walked to the work site. Steelman made an excuse and returned to White's house where he allegedly attacked Mrs. Bruce White. Her yelling alerted a Black field hand who had run away after Mrs. White started screaming. A mob then hunted him down and, even though he had a gun, were able to capture him. John Steelman was tied to a stake wood piled around him and then the pyre was ignited by Mrs. Bruce White.
Rivers, Thomas	25	African American	Bossier Parish	Bossier	Louisiana	August 30, 1922	Assault of a white woman	When Thomas Rivers was arrested, the community threatened to lynch him. He was being moved to the Benton jail when a mob overpowered the officers and took Rivers. His body was found hanging near the Shreveport-Bossier highway about 12 miles (19 km) from Shreveport, Louisiana.
Daniel, Filmore Watt	35	White	Mer Rouge	Morehouse	Louisiana	August 24, 1922	Spoke out against KKK activities	The Ku Klux Klan kidnapped the men on August 24, 1922, and the bodies were discovered in nearby Lake Lafourche on December 24, 1922.
Richards, Thomas F.	30	White	Mer Rouge	Morehouse	Louisiana	August 24, 1922	Spoke out against KKK activities	The Ku Klux Klan kidnapped the men on August 24, 1922, and the bodies were discovered in nearby Lake Lafourche on December 24, 1922.
Long, Jim Reed		African American	Winder	Barrow	Georgia	September 2, 1922	Attack of a white woman, 19-year-old Ms. Violet Wood, daughter of Rev. John H. Wood	Ms. Violet Wood was visiting the house of her aunt, Ms. Pearl Saunders, when she interrupted a burglary allegedly undertaken by Jim Reed Long. Startled to find Wood in the house, he struck her with an iron bar. After his arrest, a mob quickly gathered in Winder, demanding that Long be handed over. Sheriff Camp was able to get Long out of the Barrows county jail in Winder but when he was taking him to Atlanta, he was stopped on the roads, overpowered and Jim Reed Long was taken by a mob and hanged. Some reports say by the Ku-Klux Klan. News media of the time repeated that the lynching was "orderly conducted."
Johnson, O.J.		African American	Newton	Newton	Texas	September 7, 1922	Johnson was twice tried with killing a Turpentine camp foreman four years earlier.	Hanged from a tree
Johnston, Jim		African American	Wrightsville	Johnson	Georgia	September 28, 1922	Assault of a white woman	A mob had gathered in Sandersville, and so Deputy Sheriff Davis and Nixon were driving Johnson to Wrightsville when a posse of 50 men overpowered the deputies and seized Johnson. Hanged on the Cedar Creek bridge, his body was riddled with bullets.
Everett, Grover C.		African American	Abilene	Taylor and Jones	Texas	September 28, 1922	Unknown	Shot in his hotel room by four people
Brown, John		African American	Montgomery	Montgomery	Alabama	October 3, 1922		A race riot broke out on October 3, 1922, after African American Joe Terell was arrested in connection with the murder of George Tilson who in turn was searching for a Black assailant that killed white policeman Albert Sansom. African American Edward Pearl was killed in the race rioting. The report on the lynchings of 1922 by the United States Senate Committee on the Judiciary, lists John Brown as being lynched on October 3, 1922, in Montgomery, but newspaper reports write that he was seized, questioned and released.
Hartley, Ed	40–41	White	Camden	Benton	Tennessee	October 20, 1922	Manslaughter of Connie Hartley, nephew of Ed Hartley	Shot
Hartley, George	21–22	White	Camden	Benton	Tennessee	October 20, 1922	Manslaughter of Connie Hartley, nephew of Ed Hartley	Shot
Zarate, Elias V.	22	Hispanic	Weslaco	Hidalgo	Texas	November 11, 1922	Fight with co-worker, J.L. Sullivan, in which Sullivan's arm was broken	Shot
Dickson, Cupid (also found as Cubrit Dixon)		African American	Madison	Madison	Florida	December 5, 1922		Shot
Wright, Charles; Young, Albert and an unidentified Black man		African American	Perry	Taylor	Florida	December 1922	Murder of white teacher	Escaped convict Wright was taken from sheriff by a large mob, tortured into confession, and burned at the stake. Two other suspects were shot and hanged. Several African American community buildings and homes were burned in the Perry massacre.
Smith, Less	25	African American	Morrilton	Conway	Arkansas	December 9, 1922	Murder of Granville Edward Farish	Deputy sheriff Granville Edward Farish was trying to collect a debt from Smith when a scuffle broke out. In the fight, Farish smashed a bottle over Smith's head whereupon Smith shot him in the stomach. Smith was arrested and a white mob soon gathered. When officials tried to move Smith to another jail, he was seized, hanged from a tree, and his body riddled with bullets. When the body was taken to the undertaker, the mob burst in to view the body.
Gay, George	25	African American	Streetman	Freestone and Navarro	Texas	December 11, 1922	Attempted rape of a white woman	The victim, 20-year-old Florine Grayson, could not positively identify George Gay when he was brought before her. The mob ignored this, chained him to a tree and shot him around 300 times.
Carter, Sam	45	African American	Rosewood	Levy	Florida	January 2, 1923	Sexual assault of a white woman	Falsely accused, tortured, shot, then hanged by white mob which went on a rampage burning homes and killing several other people.
Wilson, Abraham	33–34	African American	Newberry	Alachua	Florida	January 17, 1923	Cattle stealing	Serving 6-month sentence when taken from jail and hanged.
Scott, James T.	35–56	African American	Columbia	Boone	Missouri	April 29, 1923	Assaulting a 14 year old white girl	Accused of detaining and beating the daughter of a professor at the University of Columbia, where Scott worked as a janitor. Lynched by a mob of over 100 men. Memorial plaque erected in 2016.
Simmons, Henry		African American	Palm Beach	Palm Beach	Florida	June 7, 1923	Murder of a police officer	A police officer stopped "three negroes in regards to the butchering of a turtle" on June 3, 1923. After a struggle, the officer was shot and described the assailants before dying 3 days later. A lynch mob first seized James Sands, who was beaten before one of the mob declared he was "not the one". Sands was released. The mob later seized Henry Simmons from a boarding house in West Palm Beach. His body was found the morning of June 7, 1923, at a location on Barton Road on Palm Beach Island, a short distance from The Breakers. The body was shot multiple times and hanged from a tree close to where the officer was shot.
Pullen, Joe	40	African American	Drew	Sunflower	Mississippi	December 14, 1923	Murder of a white man	Shot and burned. Pullen shot and killed three members of the lynch mob before being killed.
Bell, William	33	African American	Chicago	Cook	Illinois	October 8, 1924	Accosting two girls	Beaten to death by a mob in a Jewish neighborhood. The girls, when questioned by police, admitted they were unsure if Bell was in fact the same man who had accosted them. The only lynching in Chicago history.
Smith, Samuel	15	African American	Nashville	Davidson	Tennessee	December 15, 1924	Robbed a grocery store and shot the white owner	Taken out of his hospital room in Nashville and lynched by a mob of masked men where he was first caught.
Washington, Willie	22	African American	Jacksonville	Duval	Florida	January 31, 1925		Murdered by a local policeman, Washington's body was later displayed in the county courthouse.
Jordan, James	Adult	African American	Waverly	Sussex	Virginia	March 20, 1925	Married woman "attacked" in her home.	The case and two others helped lead to the Virginia Anti-Lynching Law of 1928, the first state law against lynching.
Marshall, Robert	39–40	African American	Price	Carbon	Utah	June 18, 1925	Accused of killing a white guard	The allegation was based on the testimony of two young boys who said they saw a black man running from the scene of the crime. Marshall was lynched in front of a crowd of 1,000. When the sheriff arrived, he cut Marshall down and was putting him in the car when Marshall made noise indicating he was alive. The mob shouted to lynch him again. Afterward, Marshall's body was put on display in the funeral parlor and photos of the lynching were sold door-to-door for 25 cents. In 1998, the community provided a headstone for him.
Ivy, L. Q.	17	African American	Rocky Ford (Etta)	Union	Mississippi	September 20, 1925	Rape of a white woman	Burned at the stake
Clark, James		African American	Eau Gallie	Brevard	Florida	July 11, 1926	Rape of a white girl	Taken from law officers and lynched. No attempt to verify crime nor identify murderers: last known lynching in Brevard County
Byrd, Raymond Arthur	31	African American		Wythe	Virginia	August 15, 1926	Fathering a child with a white woman	Beaten, dragged by a car and hanged from an oak tree
Nunez, Thomas (or Munoz)		Latino	Raymondville	Willacy	Texas	September 7, 1926	Murder	All five were shot after an ambush.
Nunez, Jose		Latino	Raymondville	Willacy	Texas	September 7, 1926	Murder	All five were shot after an ambush.
Nunez, Delancio		Latino	Raymondville	Willacy	Texas	September 7, 1926	Murder	All five were shot after an ambush.
Gonzales, Cinco		Latino	Raymondville	Willacy	Texas	September 7, 1926	Murder	All five were shot after an ambush.
Zaller, Matt		White (Austrian)	Raymondville	Willacy	Texas	September 7, 1926	Murder	All five were shot after an ambush.
Nelson, Samuel		African American	Delray Beach	Palm Beach	Florida	September 26–27, 1926	Assaulting a white woman	Nelson was arrested on September 26, 1926, in Delray Beach on charges of assaulting a white woman in Miami. The following morning, the jail door was found torn open and the cell was empty. Later, a body identified as Nelson was found on a canal bank four miles west, with multiple gunshot wounds. The Delray Beach Chief of Police later testified to the City Council that they had refused to release the prisoner to a stranger claiming to be an official from Miami; however, the prisoner was counted in the cell as of midnight on September 26. The Police department was declared "free of blame of neglect" by the City Council. The culpability of the accused suspect for the crime in Miami, 55 miles away, was called into question as a major hurricane had struck eight days earlier, hampering travel
Lowman, Bertha	27	African American	Aiken vicinity	Aiken	South Carolina	October 8, 1926	Alleged murder of the sheriff	After the second day of a retrial, they were taken from the jail to the outskirts of Aiken and shot, with a large crowd in attendance.
Lowman, Demon	22	African American	Aiken vicinity	Aiken	South Carolina	October 8, 1926	Alleged murder of the sheriff	After the second day of a retrial, they were taken from the jail to the outskirts of Aiken and shot, with a large crowd in attendance.
Lowman, Clarence	14	African American	Aiken vicinity	Aiken	South Carolina	October 8, 1926	Alleged murder of the sheriff	After the second day of a retrial, they were taken from the jail to the outskirts of Aiken and shot, with a large crowd in attendance.
Buddington, George	55	African American	Waldo	Alachua	Florida	December 27, 1926	Attempted to collect debt from a white woman at gunpoint	Mob broke lock on jail, took Buddington out of town and shot him to death.
Payne, Tom	25	African American	Willis	Montgomery	Texas	February 1, 1927		Arrested in connection with a suspected assault and murder, he was taken by a white mob and hanged from a tree.
Carter, John	38	African American	Little Rock	Pulaski	Arkansas	May 4, 1927	None	No charges filed; "mob" responsible.
Anderson, Dan	32	African American	Macon	Noxubee	Mississippi	May 20, 1927	Murder of a white farmer	Shot
Sherod, Will		African American	Braggadocio	Pemiscot	Missouri	May 22, 1927	Rape	Hanged
Raspberry, Bernice	23	African American	Leakesville	Greene	Mississippi	May 25, 1927	"Alleged improper conduct with a white woman"	Hanged, shot
Flemming, Owen		African American	Mellwood	Phillips	Arkansas	June 8, 1927	Murder	Shot
Upchurch, Joseph		African American	near Paris	Henry	Tennessee	June 17, 1927	Murder	Shot
Fox, Jim		African American	Louisville	Winston	Mississippi	June 26, 1927	Murder	Brothers arrested in connection with a suspected murder of a white man, he was taken by a white mob, tied to a telephone pole with barbed wire, and burned.
Fox, Mark		African American	Louisville	Winston	Mississippi	June 26, 1927	Murder	Brothers arrested in connection with a suspected murder of a white man, he was taken by a white mob, tied to a telephone pole with barbed wire, and burned.
Smith, Joe		African American	Yazoo City	Yazoo	Mississippi	July 7, 1927	Attempting to "attack" a "young white girl"	Hanged, shot
Williams, Albert		African American	Chiefland	Levy	Florida	July 21, 1927	Assault	Shot
Bradshaw, Thomas		African American	Bailey	Nash	North Carolina	August 2, 1927	Rape	Shot
Pounds, Winston		African American	Wilmot	Ashley	Arkansas	August 25–26, 1927	Breaking and entering, assaulting a white woman	Hanged
Williams, Thomas		African American	Memphis	Shelby	Tennessee	September 28, 1927	Attacking a fifty-year old white woman	Shot
Choate, Henry	18	African American	Columbia	Maury	Tennessee	November 13, 1927	Assaulting a white girl	Killed with a hammer, dragged by automobile and hanged at the County Courthouse in Columbia.
Woods, Leonard	30	African American	Pound Gap	Letcher	Kentucky	November 30, 1927	Murder	Hanged
Ratliff, Marshall	26	White	Cisco	Eastland	Texas	December 23, 1927	Bank robbery	Robbed a bank with three accomplices while dressed as Santa Claus. Ensuing shootout(s), manhunt, capture, and lynch mob. His hands and feet were bound, and he was hanged with rope thrown over a guy-wire between two telephone poles in a vacant lot behind a movie theater.
Bearden, James	25	African American	Brookhaven	Lincoln	Mississippi	June 29, 1928	Argued with white men over debt	Dragged behind car, hanged
Bearden, Stanly	24	African American	Brookhaven	Lincoln	Mississippi	June 29, 1928	Argued with white men over debt	Dragged behind car, hanged
Benavides, Rafael		Latino	Farmington	San Juan	New Mexico	November 16, 1928	Attacking a white man's wife	Benavides was a Mexican shepherd who was accused by the police to have attacked a white man's wife. The police then went to arrest Benavides and shot him for resisting arrest. They rushed him to the hospital; three men then called the hospital asking if the Mexican was being guarded by authorities which the nurse confirmed he wasn't. The three men later on snuck into the hospital, kidnapped Benavides and hanged him from a tree near an abandoned ranch.
Seeman, Louis "Slim"	30s	African American	North Platte	Lincoln	Nebraska	July 13, 1929	Murder of police officer Ed Green	Shot

=== 1930–1949 ===
Name	Age	Ethnicity	City	County/Parish	State	Date	Accusation	Comment
Wilkins, John H.	45	African American	Locust Grove	Henry	Georgia	April 18, 1930	Smiling at a white woman	Wilkins, a pullman porter, was dragged off his train and lynched. A protest manifesto mentioning his lynching and two others had a cropped picture of a lynched African American. This cropped photograph is taken from one of an African American lynched/hanged from a telephone pole in a railyard (Georgia(?); it is unknown if the original photo is of Wilkins.
Green, Allen	50	African American	Walhalla vicinity	Oconee	South Carolina	April 24, 1930	Rape of a white woman	After severely injuring the sheriff, the victim was taken from the county jail, tied to a tree outside the city, and shot multiple times by a crowd of about 100 men.
Hughes, George	41	African American	Sherman	Grayson	Texas	May 9, 1930	Rape of a white woman	Courthouse stormed (during trial), burned down with Hughes, who had just pleaded guilty, locked in vault, fire hoses cut. Body then dragged behind car and hanged, and fire lit under it. Followed by riot and destruction of black businesses. Two persons received two-year sentences for violence.
Johnson, George	30	African American	Honey Grove	Fannin	Texas	May 16, 1930	Murder of his white landlord	Shot by a sheriff's posse
Argo, Henry		African American	Chickasha	Grady	Oklahoma	May 30, 1930	Rape of a white woman	Shot
Roan, William		African American	Bryan	Brazos	Texas	June 18, 1930	Attempted rape of a white woman	Shot
Jenkins, Dan	22	African American	Union vicinity	Union	South Carolina	June 21, 1930	Rape of a white woman	Captured by local citizens and identified by the woman, he was shot by a mob of about 150. The governor had been notified of the potential lynching and ordered out the National Guard, which arrived twenty minutes too late.
Robertson, Jack		African American	Round Rock	Williamson	Texas	June 28, 1930	Attempted murder of a white couple	Shot
Shipp, Thomas	19	African American	Marion	Grant	Indiana	August 7, 1930	Robbery of white couple; murder of a white man and rape of a white woman	Lynch mob of thousands broke into jail and took Thomas Shipp, Abram Smith and James Cameron. The mob hanged the first two up in a tree. Cameron was released by the mob but was convicted of accessory and served time, later becoming an activist and founding the America's Black Holocaust Museum. Smith later confirmed the guilt of Shipp and Smith.
Smith, Abram	19	African American	Marion	Grant	Indiana	August 7, 1930	Robbery of white couple; murder of a white man and rape of a white woman	Lynch mob of thousands broke into jail and took Thomas Shipp, Abram Smith and James Cameron. The mob hanged the first two up in a tree. Cameron was released by the mob but was convicted of accessory and served time, later becoming an activist and founding the America's Black Holocaust Museum. Smith later confirmed the guilt of Shipp and Smith.
Moore, Oliver	29	African American		Edgecombe	North Carolina	August 19, 1930	Alleged sexual improprieties with two young white girls	Hanged and shot by mob who broke into jail
Grant, George	40	African American	Darien	McIntosh	Georgia	September 8, 1930	Killing a police officer, and wounding three other people	Sheriff: "I don't know who killed the nigger and I don't give a damn."
Mitchell, Lacy	49	African American	Thomasville	Thomas	Georgia	September 28, 1930	Testified against two white men charged with the rape of a black woman	Dragged from his home and shot by four masked white men. Two attackers, Jack Bradley and O.E. Allen, were identified, convicted of murder, and sentenced to life in prison. The two men whom Mitchell testified against, Henry Price and C.V. Moore were both convicted of rape and each sentenced to one year in prison.
Parker, John		African American	Conway	Faulkner	Arkansas	1931	Stealing some peaches	
Wise, Mrs.		African American	Frankfort, Virginia		Virginia	1931	Objected to her daughter being taken out for "rides" with white Klansmen.	
Gunn, Raymond	27	African American	Maryville	Nodaway	Missouri	January 12, 1931	Murdering a white woman	Burned to death. National Guard stood by and watched.
Bannon, Charles	22	White	Schafer	McKenzie	North Dakota	January 29, 1931	Murdering his employer and family	Mob broke into jail and hanged him from a bridge. The lynching resulted in North Dakota nearly reinstating the death penalty to deter future lynchings.
Williams, Matthew	23	African American	Salisbury	Wicomico	Maryland	December 4, 1931	Killing his employer	Taken forcibly from hospital. No indictment despite numerous witnesses.
Mendiola, Higinio	46	Latino	Edinburg	Hidalgo	Texas	December 29, 1931	None	A mob of 7 people hanged Higinio from a tree near his home to make it appear that he had committed suicide in order to collect insurance for his death.
Tillis, Dave	52	African American	Crockett	Houston	Texas	1932	"Demanded an accounting from his landlord. Charged with 'entering the bedroom of a white woman'".	
Thompson, Shedrick	39	African American	rural	Fauquier	Virginia	1932	Rape of a white woman and assault of her husband	Body was found hanged and burnt after a manhunt. Local authorities claimed it was a suicide.
Kahahawai, Joseph	22	Hawaiian	Honolulu	Honolulu County	Hawaii	January 7, 1932	Rape of a white woman	Kahahawai and four friends were accused of gang raping a white woman named Thalia Massie. After their trial ended in a hung jury, Kahahawai was abducted by Massie's mother, Grace Fortescue, and three others, who attempted to beat a confession out of him before shooting him. He was later posthumously cleared. Fortescue and her three accomplices were all convicted of manslaughter and sentenced to 10 years in prison. Under political pressure, however, this was commuted a single hour in the executive chamber of the governor's office by Territorial Governor Lawrence M. Judd.
Read, Pleasant Richard	53	White	Atwood	Rawlins	Kansas	April 17, 1932	Kidnapping, rape, and murder of an 8-year-old white girl	A mob of 200 farmers from the victim's hometown broke into the jail, overpowered the sheriff, and hanged Read from a tree. Read had previously been nearly lynched in Colorado in 1916 after raping a 16-year-old girl. Last lynching in Kansas. The lynching contributed to the reinstatement of the death penalty in Kansas, partly as a way to deter future lynchings.
Micou, Reuben	65	African American	Louisville	Winston	Mississippi	April 2, 1933	Getting into an altercation with a white man	Abducted from jail by a mob. Micou's injuries suggested he was whipped before being shot multiple times.
Dendy, Norris	33	African American	Clinton	Laurens	South Carolina	June 4–5, 1933	Striking a white man following an argument	Broken out of jail by a group of men; five white men named in an indictment but none were convicted.
Lawrence, Elizabeth		African American	rural	Jefferson	Alabama	June/July 1933	Reprimanding a group of white children who threw stones at her	
Armwood, George	23	African American	Princess Anne	Somerset	Maryland	October 18, 1933	Attempted assault and rape	Grand jury declined to indict any of the lynchers identified by State Police. Last lynching in Maryland.
Holmes, John M.	29	White	San Jose	Santa Clara	California	November 26–27, 1933	Kidnapping and murder of department store heir Brooke Hart	An estimated 10,000 people witnessed the lynching. California Governor James Rolph called the act "a fine lesson for the whole nation."
Thurmond, Thomas Harold	27	White	San Jose	Santa Clara	California	November 26–27, 1933	Kidnapping and murder of department store heir Brooke Hart	An estimated 10,000 people witnessed the lynching. California Governor James Rolph called the act "a fine lesson for the whole nation."
Gregory, David	25	African American	Kountze	Hardin	Texas	December 7, 1933	Rape and murder of a white woman	Shot and burned at the stake. Upon hearing he was wanted for the Dec. 2 rape and shotgun murder of a white woman, he fled to a church and hid in its belfry, where a white mob, including several law enforcement officials, cornered him on Dec. 7. When Gregory refused to come down, a member of the mob shot him. The shot rendered him unconscious, and the county sheriff moved him to a local hospital before sneaking him out after hearing word of a lynch mob heading to the hospital. Gregory died in the sheriff's car. Soon after, a mob surrounded the sheriff's car, removed Gregory's body, mutilated him, tied him behind a car, and dragged him around town before depositing his body at his mother's doorstep. When she refused to entertain the mob, the mob set a bonfire and burned Gregory's remains at the stake. Years after Gregory's lynching, a white man allegedly admitted to the white woman's rape and murder on his deathbed.
Cheek, James Cordie	17	African American		Maury	Tennessee	December 15, 1933	Attempted rape	Mutilated and hanged after being cleared by a grand jury.
Johnson, Robert	40	African American	Tampa	Hillsborough	Florida	January 30, 1934	Assault on white woman	Investigators determined charges against Johnson were meritless, then released him to a lynch mob.
Neal, Claude	23	African American	Greenwood	Jackson	Florida	October 26, 1934	Rape and murder of a white woman	Lynchers said he "didn't deserve a trial". Castrated, forced to consume his genitals, stabbed, burned with hot irons, toes and fingers removed, hanged, body tied behind automobile. Followed by Marianna riots. Important case in helping to bring lynching to an end.
Moore, Bert	25	African American	Columbus	Lowndes	Mississippi	July 13, 1935	Attempted rape of a white woman	Hanged from a tree.
Morton, Dooley	17	African American	Columbus	Lowndes	Mississippi	July 13, 1935	Attempted rape of a white woman	Hanged from a tree.
Stacey, Reuben (also found as Rubin Stacy)	37	African American	Fort Lauderdale	Broward	Florida	July 19, 1935	Threatening and frightening a white woman with a pen knife	Law enforcement officer; grand jury refused to indict. In 2022, a two-mile stretch of Davie Boulevard in Fort Lauderdale was renamed Rubin Stacy Memorial Boulevard.
Johnson, Clyde L.	24	White	Yreka	Siskyou	California	August 3, 1935	Killing of Police Chief Frank R. Daw	Dunsmuir Police Chief Frank Daw was shot and killed on July 29, 1935, when he confronted an armed robbery suspect. Johnson, the alleged perpetrator, was removed from the Siskiyou County Jail and was hanged from a tree near Yreka.
Higginbotham, Elwood	28	African American	Oxford	Lafayette	Mississippi	September 17, 1935	Killed a white man in self-defense after he attacked him for complaining about the white man's cattle running over his field.	Killed when jury did not bring back guilty verdict promptly. Widow and extended family immediately left Mississippi.
Bell, Baxter	45	African American		Cheatham	Tennessee	November 4, 1935	Slapping a white woman	After Bell was arrested for assault, a group of five white men overpowered the sheriff escorting him and shot him. All five men, brothers Luther, Jesse, Clyde, and James Dotson, as well as their cousin Allie Brown, were charged with murder and assault. Luther was the husband of the slapped woman. The five were acquitted of murder, but convicted of assault. The Dotson brothers were each sentenced to 11 months and 29 days and jail and fined $50. Brown was fined $50.
Townes, Roosevelt	26	African American	Duck Hill	Montgomery	Mississippi	April 13, 1937	Robbery and murder of a white store owner	Tied to a tree and tortured with blowtorches to extract a confession. McDaniels shot, Townes burned alive. Photos of the lynching made the national media.
McDaniels, Robert	20	African American	Duck Hill	Montgomery	Mississippi	April 13, 1937	Robbery and murder of a white store owner	Tied to a tree and tortured with blowtorches to extract a confession. McDaniels shot, Townes burned alive. Photos of the lynching made the national media.
Hawkins, Richard	16	African American	Tallahassee	Leon	Florida	July 19, 1937	Broke into a store, accused of attacking a police officer with a knife	Locked up in Leon County Jail after confessing to breaking and entering; four masked men kidnapped the two from the jail, shot them dozens of times, and put warnings to other African Americans where the bodies laid.
Ponder, Ernest	14–18	African American	Tallahassee	Leon	Florida	July 19, 1937	Broke into a store, accused of attacking a police officer with a knife	Locked up in Leon County Jail after confessing to breaking and entering; four masked men kidnapped the two from the jail, shot them dozens of times, and put warnings to other African Americans where the bodies laid.
Gooden, Albert	35	African American	Covington	Tipton	Tennessee	August 16, 1937	Murder of a white police officer	Accused of murdering Marshall Chester Doyle. Taken from sheriff by 100 men and lynched from bridge over Beaver Creek; body recovered from river by sheriff's deputies.
Brown, Miles Wilson	25	White	Panama City	Bay	Florida	April 1, 1939	Murder of his employer	After Brown was convicted of murder, but received a recommendation of mercy, meaning he would face life in prison instead of execution, he was taken from jail by a mob and shot.
Williams, Elbert	31	African American	Brownsville	Haywood	Tennessee	June 20, 1940	Registering to vote and starting an NAACP chapter.	Last reported lynching in Tennessee.
Thornton, Jesse	26	African American	Luverne	Crenshaw	Alabama	June 22, 1940	Failure to address a white police officer as "Mr."	Shot and thrown into the Patsaliga River
Callaway, Austin		African American	LaGrange	Troup	Georgia	September 8, 1940	Attempted rape of a white woman	Shot
Hall, Felix	19	African American	Fort Benning	Chattahoochee	Georgia	February 1941	Unknown	Hanged from a tree in a ravine.
Wright, Cleo	26	African American	Sikeston	Scott	Missouri	January 25, 1942	Attempted rape of a white woman and attempted murder of a white police officer	Burned alive in front of two black church congregations. Around 100 black people left Sikeston and never returned.
Green, Ernest	12	African American	Shubuta ("hanging bridge")	Clarke	Mississippi	October 11, 1942	Attempted rape of a 13-year-old white girl	Taken from their cells and hanged from a bridge after pleading guilty at their preliminary hearing.
Lang, Charlie	12	African American	Shubuta ("hanging bridge")	Clarke	Mississippi	October 11, 1942	Attempted rape of a 13-year-old white girl	Taken from their cells and hanged from a bridge after pleading guilty at their preliminary hearing.
Hall, Robert		African American	Newton	Baker	Georgia	January 30, 1943	Tire theft	Beaten to death by law enforcement. The three attackers were convicted on federal civil rights violations, but had their convictions overturned by the Supreme Court in 1945.
Harrison, Cellos	31	African American	Marianna	Jackson	Florida	June 16, 1943	Murder of a white man	Awaiting new trial after conviction overturned on appeal.
Tropschuh, Felix	29	White (German)	Camp Concordia	Cloud County	Kansas	October 18, 1943	Collaborating with the American authorities	Forced to hang himself by a mob of German POWs.
Kunze, Johannes	39	White (German)	Camp Tonkawa	Kay	Oklahoma	November 4, 1943	Collaborating with the American authorities	Beaten to death by a mob of at least 20 fellow German POWs. Five of the attackers were convicted of premeditated murder, sentenced to death, and executed by hanging in 1945.
Krauss, Hugo	24	White (German)	Camp Hearne	Robertson	Texas	December 17, 1943	Collaborating with the American authorities	Beaten to death by a mob of six to 10 fellow German POWs. Before Camp Hearne closed in 1946, one of the attackers, Günther Meisel, confessed out of remorse. Meisel and six others were convicted of premeditated murder and sentenced to life in prison. On appeal, the convictions of two were overturned and the sentences of the other five were reduced. Meisel had his sentence reduced to 15 years and the others had their sentences reduced to 10 years. They were all released from prison under the order of President Harry S. Truman in 1949.
Howard, Willie James	15	African American	Live Oak	Suwannee	Florida	January 2, 1944	Sending Christmas card with "a note expressing his affection" to a white girl.	Forced to jump to his death in the Suwanee River. Grand jury refused to indict.
Drechsler, Werner	27	White (German)	Camp Papago Park	Maricopa	Arizona	March 12, 1944	Collaborating with the American authorities	Hanged by seven fellow German POWs. The seven attackers were convicted of premeditated murder, sentenced to death, and executed by hanging in 1945.
Günther, Horst	23	White (German)	Camp Aiken	Aiken	South Carolina	April 6, 1944	Collaborating with the American authorities	Strangled by two fellow German POWs and hanged from a tree. Both attackers were convicted of premeditated murder, sentenced to death, and executed by hanging in 1945.
Dorsey, George W.	28	African American		Walton	Georgia	July 25, 1946	Stabbing of a white man (Roger Malcom)	Huge investigation. 2003 and 2016 books on this investigation. No one charged.
Dorsey, Mae Murray	23	African American		Walton	Georgia	July 25, 1946	Stabbing of a white man (Roger Malcom)	Huge investigation. 2003 and 2016 books on this investigation. No one charged.
Malcom, Roger	24	African American		Walton	Georgia	July 25, 1946	Stabbing of a white man (Roger Malcom)	Huge investigation. 2003 and 2016 books on this investigation. No one charged.
Malcom, Dorothy Dorsey	20	African American		Walton	Georgia	July 25, 1946	Stabbing of a white man (Roger Malcom)	Huge investigation. 2003 and 2016 books on this investigation. No one charged.
Collier, Alton	26	African American	Coronado	San Diego	California	April 27, 1946	Alleged stabbing of a white sailor (Freddie Leroy Johnson) who was part of a crowd already chasing him with weapons to the bow of the boat shouting racial slurs.	Forced off a ferry and left to drown. Ruled a suicide until 2024 when the Equal Justice Initiative declared it a lynching.
Jones, John Cecil	31	African American	near Minden	Webster	Louisiana	August 8, 1946	Peering into a white woman's house through the window	Beaten, tortured and mutilated along with his cousin Albert Harris Jr.
Earle, Willie	24	African American	Greenville	Greenville	South Carolina	February 16, 1947	Robbery and murder of a white taxi driver	31 suspects charged and 28 tried; all acquitted.
Gilbert, Henry "Peg"	42	African American		Harris	Georgia	May 22, 1947	Hiding Gus Davidson, accused of killing a white farmer	Shot and killed by Police Chief W. H. Buchanan in Harris County Jail.
Turner, William "Wilson" Hardy	25	White	Moreland	Coweta	Georgia	April 20, 1948	Stealing two cows from wealthy landowner John Wallace	Released from jail and beaten to death by Wallace, after which his body was cremated. Wallace was convicted of murder, sentenced to death, and executed by electrocution in 1950. Three accomplices pleaded guilty to murder and received life sentences. They were paroled in 1955. Two others testified against Wallace in exchange for immunity. The sheriff who released Turner was charged as an accessory to murder, but died while awaiting trial.
Mallard, Robert	38	African American	Lyons	Toombs	Georgia	November 20, 1948	Voting and prosperity	Car surrounded by 20 Ku Klux Klan members. Car was shot at with pistols.

=== 1950–1975 ===
Name	Age	Ethnicity	City	County/Parish	State	Date	Accusation	Comment
Council, Lynn	19	African American	near Raleigh	Wake	North Carolina	November 1952	Robbery	Subjected to a mock or aborted lynching by the police. He was released after refusing to confess. Newspapers treat it as an attempted lynching. Council received a formal apology from the law enforcement agencies involved in 2019.
Banks, Isadore	59	African American	Marion	Crittenden	Arkansas	June 1954	Being prosperous	Tied to a tree and burned alive.
Till, Emmett	14	African American	Money	LeFlore	Mississippi	August 28, 1955	Flirting with white woman	Beaten and mutilated before shooting him in the head and sinking his body in the Tallahatchie River. Perpetrators acquitted by all-white jury, then openly admitted they did it. Historical markers shot and defaced 2006–2018.
Parker, Mack Charles	22	African American	Bridge over Pearl River between Mississippi and Louisiana	Pearl River	Mississippi	April 24, 1959	Kidnapping and rape of a pregnant white woman	Taken from his prison cell and shot.
Chaney, James	21	African American	Philadelphia	Neshoba	Mississippi	June 21, 1964	Civil rights worker	A federal jury in 1967 convicted the sheriff and six others of conspiracy to violate civil rights and received prison terms ranging from 3 to 10 years. A state jury in 2005 found the Ku Klux Klan organizer, Edgar Ray Killen, guilty of three counts of manslaughter; he died in prison. National outrage contributed to passage of Civil Rights Act of 1964.
Goodman, Andrew	20	White (Jewish)	Philadelphia	Neshoba	Mississippi	June 21, 1964	Civil rights worker	A federal jury in 1967 convicted the sheriff and six others of conspiracy to violate civil rights and received prison terms ranging from 3 to 10 years. A state jury in 2005 found the Ku Klux Klan organizer, Edgar Ray Killen, guilty of three counts of manslaughter; he died in prison. National outrage contributed to passage of Civil Rights Act of 1964.
Schwerner, Michael	24	White (Jewish)	Philadelphia	Neshoba	Mississippi	June 21, 1964	Civil rights worker	A federal jury in 1967 convicted the sheriff and six others of conspiracy to violate civil rights and received prison terms ranging from 3 to 10 years. A state jury in 2005 found the Ku Klux Klan organizer, Edgar Ray Killen, guilty of three counts of manslaughter; he died in prison. National outrage contributed to passage of Civil Rights Act of 1964.
Penn, Lemuel Augustus	48	African American		Madison	Georgia	July 11, 1964		Shot by members of the Ku Klux Klan. The triggermen, Cecil Myers and Howard Sims, were both convicted of conspiracy to deprive Penn of his civil rights and sentenced to 10 years in prison. They served about six years each. Sims was shot and killed during an argument in 1981.
Morris, Frank	50	African American	Ferriday	Concordia	Louisiana	December 14, 1964	"Flirting" with white females	
Rembert, Winifred	19	African American	Cuthbert	Randolph	Georgia	1965	Fighting with deputy while in jail for stealing car to get away from two men shooting at him.	Survived. Rembert became a successful leatherwork artist and had at least two documentary films made about his story. He died in 2021.
Pyszko, Marian	54	White (Polish)	Detroit	Wayne	Michigan	July 28, 1975	None	Killed by a group of Black youths with concrete block during riot. Three of his alleged attackers were charged with first degree murder, but acquitted.

=== 1976–1999 ===
Name	Age	Ethnicity	City	County/Parish	State	Date	Accusation	Comment
Gardner, Betty	33	African American	St. Helena Island	Beaufort	South Carolina	April 12, 1978	None (one of the perpetrators hated black people)	Two white men, cousins John Arnold and John Plath, were convicted of murder, sentenced to death, and executed by lethal injection in 1998.
Higdon, Benny	21	White	Miami	Miami-Dade	Florida	May 17, 1980	None (killed during 1980 Miami riots)	Killed by an African American mob. In 1981, 17-year-old Samuel Lightsey was convicted of three counts of second degree murder and brothers Leonard and Lawrence Capers were both convicted of three counts of third degree murder for killing Higdon, Owens, and Barreca. Lightsey was convicted of three counts of second degree murder and received three consecutive life sentences. Lightsey received three consecutive life sentences and the Capers brothers were each sentenced to 45 years in prison. In 1983, Nathaniel Lane, the alleged ringleader of the attacks on the Kulps, Higdon, Owens, and Barreca, was convicted of attempted first degree murder and armed robbery for shooting a black teenager in the neck, paralyzing him as a result, during a robbery. He received two consecutive life terms and died in prison in 2016.
Owens, Robert	15	White	Miami	Miami-Dade	Florida	May 17, 1980	None (killed during 1980 Miami riots)	
Barreca, Charles	15	White	Miami	Miami-Dade	Florida	May 17, 1980	None (killed during 1980 Miami riots)	
Kulp, Jeffrey	22	White	Miami	Miami-Dade	Florida	May 17, 1980	None (killed during 1980 Miami riots)	
Donald, Michael	19	African American	Mobile	Mobile	Alabama	March 21, 1981	None (Klan looked to kill a black man because accused killer of white policeman got mistrial).	Three Klansmen (Henry Hays, James Knowles, and Benjamin Cox) were convicted of Donald's murder. Henry Hays was sentenced to death and executed in the electric chair in 1997. James Knowles and Benjamin Cox were sentenced to life in prison. A civil suit against the United Klans of America caused their bankruptcy.
Turks, Willie	34	African American	New York City	Sheepshead Bay, Brooklyn	New York	June 22, 1982	Drove through a majority-white neighborhood between his subway maintenance shifts.	Turks and two other black subway employees were attacked by 15 to 20 assailants who shouted racial epithets. Six people were charged, albeit one was murdered before trial and the charges against another were dropped. Gino Bova, 18 at the time, was convicted of second degree manslaughter and sentenced to 5 to 15 years in prison. Justice Sybil Hart Kooper said at the sentencing: "There was a lynch mob on Avenue X that night. The only thing missing was a rope and a tree." Paul Mormando was sentenced to two years in prison for several misdemeanor convictions. Anthony Miccio was convicted of felony assault and rioting and sentenced to three to nine years in prison. A fugitive in the case, Joseph Powell, turned himself in 1984. Powell pleaded guilty to assault and was sentenced to 3 to 9 years in prison.
Chin, Vincent Jen	27	Chinese American	Highland Park	Wayne	Michigan	June 23, 1982	Being Asian during a time when Japan was cutting into the profits of Detroit automakers.	Two white men working for the Chrysler plant, supervisor Ronald Ebens and his stepson Michael Nitz assaulted Chin outside of a McDonald's with a baseball bat following a brawl that took place at a strip club. A witness described them using anti-Asian racial slurs as they attacked him, ultimately beating him to death.
Coggins, Wayne Timothy	23	African American	Griffin	Spalding	Georgia	October 9, 1983	Dancing with a white woman	Stabbed 30 times and dragged to death. The case remains unsolved until 2017, when five people were arrested. In 2018, Frankie Gebhardt was convicted of murder and sentenced to life in prison. William Moore, pleaded guilty to voluntary manslaughter and was sentenced to 20 years in prison plus 10 years of probation.
Kerrick Majors	14	African American	Nashville	Davidson	Tennessee	April 26, 1987	Accidentally broke a $2 vase	Kidnapped, tortured, beaten, and stabbed to death by 24-year-old Donald Middlebrooks, 17-year-old Tammy Middlebrooks, and 16-year-old Robert Brewington. All three were convicted of first degree murder and kidnapping. Donald was sentenced to death, while Tammy and Brewington, who were both juveniles, received life sentences. Tammy was paroled some time after 2015, while Brewington will become eligible for parole in 2026.
Hawkins, Yusef	16	African American	New York City	East New York, Brooklyn	New York	August 23, 1989	Believed to be attending a party held by a white girl.	Mob of 10 to 30, at least seven with baseball bats chased and beat Hawkins and friends. Hawkins was shot by Joseph Fama. In 1990, Fama was convicted of second degree murder and sentenced to life in prison. He was paroled in 2025. Keith Mondello, was acquitted of murder charges but convicted of 12 lesser offenses and sentenced to up to 16 years in prison, of which he served eight. Three other men were convicted of crimes while three were charged but not convicted.
Rosenbaum, Yankel	29	Australian Jew	New York City	Crown Heights, Brooklyn	New York	August 19, 1991	Being Jewish	Rosenbaum, a student from Australia, was stabbed to death by a mob as part of the Crown Heights riot. Both New York Senator Daniel Moynihan and New York City Mayor David N. Dinkins called the killing a lynching. Lemrick Nelson and Charles Price were both convicted of federal civil rights violations resulting in Rosenbaum's death. Nelson was sentenced to nearly 20 years in prison and Price was sentenced to nearly 22 years in prison. After winning a retrial, Nelson was convicted of violating Rosenbaum's civil rights, but acquitted of causing his death, while Price pleaded guilty. Nelson was sentenced to 10 years in prison and Price was sentenced to 11.5 years in prison.
Rembert, Benny	35	African-American	Birmingham	Jefferson	Alabama	April 18, 1992	None (white supremacists)	Murdered by four members of the Aryan National Front, who fatally stabbed him, then dragged his body over to a train track, where his legs were run over. 17-year-old Mark Lane was convicted of manslaughter and sentenced to 20 years in prison. Malcolm Driskill and Edward Hardeman were both convicted of murder and sentenced to life in prison and 30 years, respectively. 17-year-old Christi Watson, who did not directly participate in the attack, pleaded guilty to manslaughter and was sentenced to 15 years in prison, with all but 9 months suspended.
Wilson, Christopher	32	African American	Valrico	Hillsborough	Florida	January 1, 1993	None (white supremacists)	Three white men kidnapped Wilson and set him on fire. Wilson survived. Mark Kohut, 27, and Charles Rourk, 33, were both convicted of attempted first degree murder, kidnapping, and robbery, and each sentenced to life in prison without parole. Their 17-year-old accomplice, Jeffery Pellett, was sentenced to 6.5 years in federal prison for carjacking after agreeing to testify against them.
Byrd Jr., James	49	African American	Jasper	Jasper	Texas	June 7, 1998	None (white supremacists)	Dragged to death behind a car, until his head hit a culvert. Lawrence Brewer, John King, and Shawn Berry were all convicted of capital murder. Brewer and King were both sentenced to death and executed by lethal injection in 2011 and 2018, respectively. Berry received a life sentence.

== 21st century ==
Name	Age	Ethnicity	City	County/Parish	State	Date	Accusation	Comment
James Craig Anderson	47	African American	Jackson	Hinds	Mississippi	June 26, 2011	Grand theft auto	Beaten, run over with a truck. Driver convicted of murder, ten convicted of hate crimes. All 10 attackers pleaded guilty to federal hate crimes charges and received sentences ranging from 7 to 50 years. The most culpable attacker, Deryl Dedmon, also received a life sentence for murder in state court.
Ahmaud Arbery	25	African American	Satilla Shores	Glynn	Georgia	February 23, 2020	Burglary	Chased down and shot. Travis McMichael, his father Gregory McMichael, and their neighbor William Bryan were convicted of murder in state court and hate crime charges in federal court. The McMichaels were both sentenced to life in prison without parole, while Bryan was sentenced to life in prison with the possibility of parole in state court and 35 years in prison in federal court.

== See also ==
- Mob rule – Democracy spoiled by demagoguery and the rule of passion over reason
- Vigilantism – Act of preventing and punishing crimes without legal authority
- Lists of killings by law enforcement officers in the United States
- Racism in the United States
  - Racism against African Americans
    - Treatment of the enslaved in the United States
    - Jim Crow laws
- Mass racial violence in the United States
  - Red Summer
- The National Memorial for Peace and Justice

== Bibliography ==
References

- "Man's charged body found at Bolinger". Atlanta Tri-Weekly Journal. Atlanta, Fulton, Georgia. January 31, 1922. pp. 1–6. OCLC 20076854.
- "Negro is lynched on way to trial". Atlanta Tri-Weekly Journal. Atlanta, Fulton, Georgia: John S. Cohen. September 30, 1922. pp. 1–6. OCLC 20076854.
- "Farmers Lynch Negro". The Birmingham Age-Herald. Birmingham, Jefferson, Alabama: Age-Herald Co. March 19, 1922. ISSN 2692-6318. OCLC 12607279.
- "Woman fires pile to burn assailant". The Brattleboro Daily Reformer. Brattleboro, Windham, Vermont: Reformer. August 24, 1922. pp. 1–10. ISSN 2474-6134. OCLC 13712537.
- "Negro lynched for attacking a young white girl". The Brunswick News. Brunswick, Glynn, Georgia: Clarence and Louis Leavy. July 25, 1922. pp. 1–6. ISSN 1090-3895. OCLC 21707708.
- Cardoso, Lawrence A. (1980). "Mexican Policies and Attitudes in the 1920s: New Urgency". Mexican Emigration to the United States, 1897–1931. University of Arizona Press. pp. 96–118. doi:10.2307/j.ctvss3xzr.10. ISBN 978-0-8165-0678-1. JSTOR j.ctvss3xzr.10. - Total pages: 23
- "Negro taken by mob and hanged". Capital Journal. Salem, Marion, Oregon: G. Putnam. August 30, 1922. pp. 1–8. ISSN 2470-6779. OCLC 21019600.
- "Investigate Lynching". The Chicago Whip. Chicago, Cook County, Illinois: Whip Pub. Co. July 15, 1922. pp. 1–8. ISSN 2694-099X. OCLC 15192974.
- "Negro assaulter is found on tree limb". The Daily Ardmoreite. Ardmore, Carter, Oklahoma: John F. Easley. August 30, 1922. pp. 1–8. ISSN 1065-7894. OCLC 12101538.
- "One slain; scores attacked in racial disorders". Dallas Express. Dallas, Dallas, Houston, Harris, Texas: W.E. King. October 7, 1922. pp. 1–8. ISSN 2331-334X. OCLC 9839625.
- "A negro named Jerry Ingram was lynched". East Mississippi Times. Starkville, Oktibbeha, Mississippi: Wm. Ward. March 24, 1922. pp. 1–8. OCLC 16396509.
- "Colored women shot;Negro suspect hanged". Evening Star. Washington, District of Columbia: W.D. Wallach & Hope. July 7, 1922. pp. 1–26. ISSN 2331-9968. OCLC 2260929.
- "Georgia lynching "orderly conducted"". Evening Star. Washington, District of Columbia: W.D. Wallach & Hope. September 3, 1922. pp. 1–62. ISSN 2331-9968. OCLC 2260929.
- "Body chained to log found afloat in River". Great Falls Tribune. Great Falls, Cascade, Montana: Tribune Co. March 20, 1922. pp. 1–8. ISSN 2378-850X. OCLC 9374534.
- "Mob lynches negro held for striking girl with iron bar". Great Falls Tribune. Great Falls, Cascade, Montana: Tribune Co. September 3, 1922. pp. 1–26. ISSN 2378-850X. OCLC 9374534.
- Griffith, Nancy Snell (September 17, 2019). "Less Smith (Lynching of)". Encyclopedia of Arkansas.
- Hagburg, Mike (October 16, 2006). "North Dakota's Last Lynching". North Dakota Supreme Court.
- Ihejirika, Maudlyne (March 21, 2019). "Chicago's only lynching victim to get memorial 95 years later". Chicago Public Media. Archived from the original on November 7, 2020.
- "Mob lynches negro near Guernsey". The Little River News. Ashdown, Little River, Arkansas: Jas. Crooks. August 2, 1922. OCLC 22523180.
- "Jim Johnson". Martinsburg Journal. Martinsburg, Berkeley, West Virginia: Evening Journal Publ. Co. September 29, 1922. pp. 1–10. OCLC 12698693.
- "Troops and fireman protecting Negroes". New Britain Herald. Hartford County, New Britain, Connecticut: Herald Pub. Co. October 3, 1922. pp. 1–18. OCLC 173714341.
- "Woman victim applies torch at Mississippi lynching". New-York Tribune. New York, New York: Ogden Mills Reid. August 24, 1922. pp. 1–22. ISSN 1941-0646. OCLC 9405688.
- "Mob kills Negro, beats score after murder of game warden". New-York Tribune. New York, New York: Ogden Mills Reid. October 3, 1922. pp. 1–24. ISSN 1941-0646. OCLC 9405688.
- "Mysterious murder of Louisiana farmer". The North Mississippi Herald. Water Valley, Yalobusha, Mississippi. March 17, 1922. pp. 1–4. ISSN 2765-9844. OCLC 16567559.
- "Georgia Mob hangs Negro who struck girl with iron bar". Palatka Daily News. Palatka, Putnam, Florida: Vickers & Guerry. September 3, 1922. pp. 1–6. ISSN 0163-5050. OCLC 4402148.
- "Negro shot dead". The Pensacola Journal. Pensacola, Escambia, Florida: Mayes & Co. July 6, 1922. pp. 1–8. ISSN 1941-109X. OCLC 16280864.
- "Investigate lynching of Negro for assault". The Pensacola Journal. Pensacola, Escambia, Florida: Mayes & Co. July 26, 1922. pp. 1–8. ISSN 1941-109X. OCLC 16280864.
- "Arkansas stages lynching bee at Hot Springs". Richmond Planet. Richmond, Virginia: Planet Pub. Co. August 5, 1922. pp. 1–8. ISSN 2151-4011. OCLC 10412790.
- "Put corpse in jail". Richmond Planet. Richmond, Virginia: Planet Pub. Co. August 5, 1922. pp. 1–8. ISSN 2151-4011. OCLC 10412790.
- "Find body of man tied to log in river". Richmond Times-Dispatch . Richmond, Virginia: Times Dispatch Pub. Co. March 19, 1922. pp. 1–58. ISSN 2333-7761. OCLC 9493729.
- United States Senate Committee on the Judiciary (1926). "To Prevent and Punish the Crime of Lynching: Hearings Before the United States Senate Committee on the Judiciary, Subcommittee on S. 121, Sixty-Ninth Congress, First Session, on Feb. 16, 1926". United States Government Publishing Office.
