= African Americans in Maryland =

Ethnic group in Maryland

Total population
- 1,965,413 (2017)

Languages
- American English, African-American Vernacular English, Baltimore English

Religion
- Historically Black Protestant and Black Catholicism

Related ethnic groups
- African Americans

The history of African Americans in Maryland is long and complex. Southern Maryland is the home of the first person of African descent to be elected to and serve in a legislature in America. His name was Mathias de Sousa and he was one of the original colonists to arrive in 1634. Southern Maryland is also the place where Josiah Henson was enslaved, and the place of brutality he wrote about in his later autobiography, which became the basis for Harriet Beecher Stowe's "Uncle Tom's Cabin".

A descendant of Josiah Henson, Matthew Henson, was also from Southern Maryland and he was one of the first people to reach the North Pole along with Admiral Robert Peary in 1909.

== Population ==
In the 2020 Census, 1,820,472 Maryland residents were identified as African American (29.5% of the total 6,177,224). In 7 of the state's 24 counties, African Americans make up more than 20% of the population: Prince George's (59.8%), Baltimore (57.8%), Charles (49.2%), Somerset (38.6%), Baltimore (29.9%), Dorchester (28.1%), and Wicomico (27.0%). African Americans in the seven counties of Prince George's (578,703), Baltimore city, Maryland (338,478), Baltimore (255,793), Montgomery (197,077), Anne Arundel (104,473), Charles (82,035), and Howard (65,275) make up more than 89% of all African Americans in the state.

== Slavery in Maryland ==
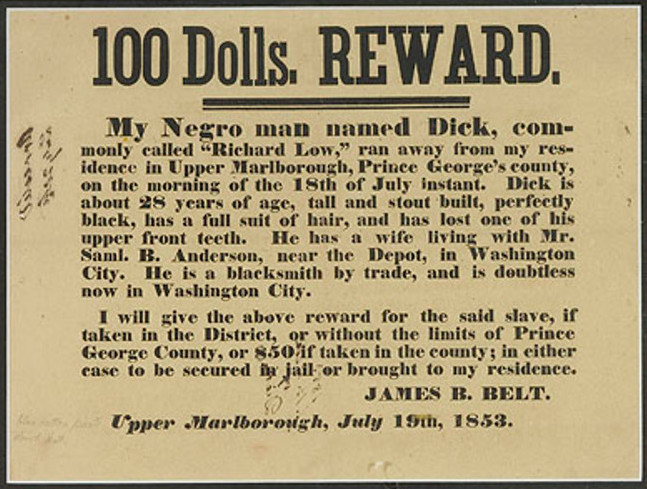
Runaway slave reward in Maryland

Maryland was not founded as an "official" slave state, although some of its founders may well have been involved in the slave trade. Instead, the colony began, as evidenced by the story of Mathias de Sousa, as a place where a person who arrived as an indentured servant could become a free person upon completing the period of indentureship. However, the Maryland Assembly in 1664 enacted a law that made African-descent servants enslaved for life (durante vita), and the law further provided that enslaved status was inherited by an enslaved person's children (later laws amended the 1664 law to specify that enslaved status followed the status of the mother). The first documented enslaved persons arrived in the Province of Maryland in 1642.

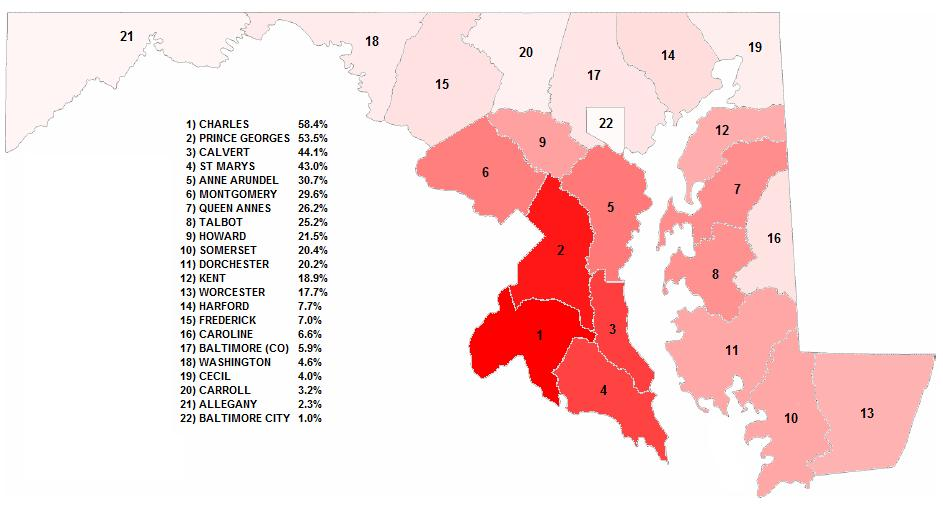
Maryland's slave population by at the time of the Civil War

Maryland was inhabited by Native Americans before Europeans began coming to the Americas. As elsewhere in the New World, many American Indians in Maryland died from violence or European disease and those who survived were largely displaced from ancestral lands, but some American Indians have remained in Maryland.
Indentured servants from England and Ireland outnumbered enslaved Africans until the 1690s.

== Notable individuals ==
=== Mathias de Sousa ===
Mathias de Sousa was one of the nine indentured servants brought to Maryland by Jesuit missionaries, and was on the Ark when Lord Baltimore's expedition arrived in the St. Mary's River in 1634. He was one of the first individuals of African descent to settle in the Maryland colony. His indenture was finished by 1638, and he became a "freemen" (a term for any man who was not a servant). Mathias became a mariner and fur trader. In 1641, he commanded a trading voyage to the Susquehannock and in 1642 was master of a small cargo vessel. Mathias was elected to and served in the 1642 legislative assembly of freemen. This makes Mathias de Sousa the first man of African descent to participate in an Assembly or Legislature in America.

=== Josiah Henson ===
Josiah Henson was an author, abolitionist, and minister. Born into slavery on June 15, 1789, in Charles County, Maryland, he was sold three times before the age of eighteen. He escaped to Upper Canada in 1830 and founded a settlement and laborer's school for other fugitive slaves in Kent County, Canada. Henson's autobiography, The Life of Josiah Henson, inspired Harriett Beecher Stowe to write "Uncle Tom's Cabin".

=== Matthew Henson ===
Matthew Henson was an American explorer best known as the co-discoverer of the North Pole with Admiral Robert Edwin Peary in 1909.

A year after the Civil War ended, Matthew Henson was born on August 8, 1866, to freeborn African American sharecroppers in Charles County, Maryland, and he was believed to be great-grandnephew of Josiah Henson. He explored the Arctic with Admiral Peary for two decades. On April 6, 1909, Peary, Henson and the rest of their team became the first people to reach the North Pole. Matthew Henson died in New York City in 1955.

== Notable locations ==
=== Historic Sotterley ===
An historic plantation c. 1703, Sotterley has become a location for exploring the past of the region. Sotterley Mission Statement: "To preserve our historic structures and natural environment and use the powerful stories of our land, lives, and labor to bring American history to life while serving as an educational and cultural resource."

Sotterley Vision Statement: "To foster a better understanding of our world today by providing a living link to America's complex history and legacy of slavery."

Historic Sotterly also participates in the Descendants Project and the UNESCO Slave Route Project.

=== Biscoe Gray Heritage Farm ===
The Biscoe Gray Heritage Farm is a living laboratory to explore, understand, and experience Southern Maryland agricultural practices and lifestyles throughout its history—from Native American settlement, small scale colonial farming, 1800s era agriculture and 20th century tobacco farming to contemporary community supported agricultural and sustainable farming efforts.

The rehabilitation of the George E. Rice House and outbuildings provides an important aspect of interpreting the African American history of the site; they illustrate early to mid-20th century small-scale farming, as well as the role of African Americans as landowners and tenant farmers. Their preservation helps understand African American heritage and culture in the region, and conveys the story of the Rice family and their connection to the land, and the ways in which African Americans shaped the physical and social landscape of Southern Maryland at the time.

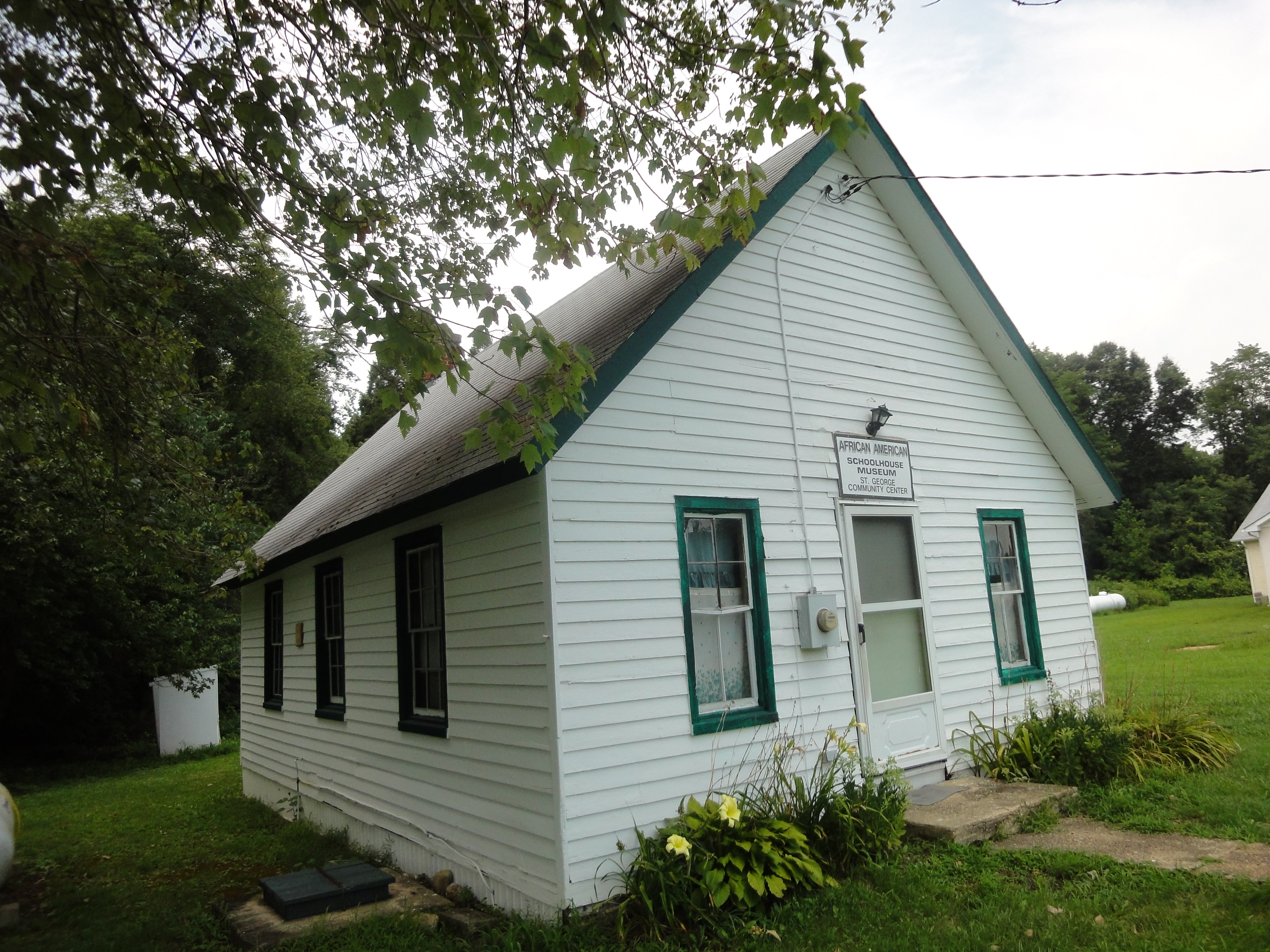
African American Schoolhouse Museum in Maryland

== Early history ==
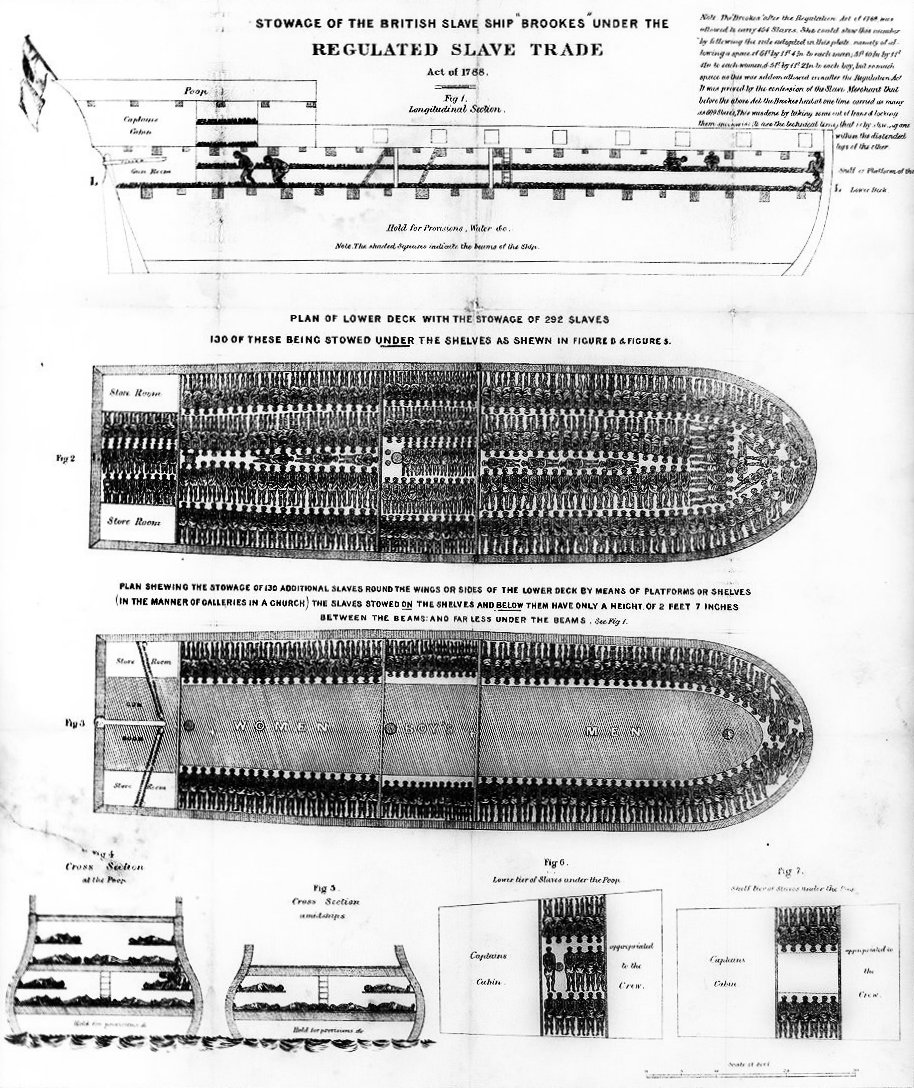
Slaveship diagram

In the 1630s, the colonial settlement of St. Mary's City was founded. Soon, the first African slaves were imported into the Province of Maryland by 1642 to develop the economy in a similar way to Virginia, with tobacco being the commodity crop, which was labor-intensive. In 1755, about 40% of Maryland's population was African Americans and most of them enslaved. The populations were concentrated in the Tidewater counties around Chesapeake Bay where tobacco was grown.

Changes in the main commodity crops to others less labor-intensive alternatives after the American Revolutionary War led numerous slaveholders to free their slaves before or at the time of their death. As a result, the percentage of black people that were free grew from less than 1% to 10% in the Upper South. By the time of the American Civil War a bit more than 49% of African Americans in Maryland were free. The boys, denied education, were torn from their parents and sold South, to the growing new territories of Missouri, Arkansas, and Texas. Marylanders and Virginians viewed themselves as breeders, centers of slave production, for export to other states.

Beginning in 1816, a new way to deal with the growing numbers of freed slaves began in Maryland with the Maryland State Colonization Society. Its purpose was to form a colony of freed slaves back into Africa by forming Republic of Maryland in what is today, Liberia. This experiment had limited success as part of the abolitionist movement. However, the rapid expansion of the cotton industry in the Deep South after the invention of the cotton gin greatly increased demand for slave labor, and the Southern states continued as slave societies. Maryland was one of the key states in the Underground Railroad with cities such as Baltimore and Cambridge focal points for transported the fugitives further north. Slavery in Maryland officially ended with the writing of the new Maryland Constitution of 1864; however, emancipation did not mean equality as the franchise was restricted to "white" males. Notably, the Maryland legislature refused to ratify both the 14th Amendment, which conferred citizenship rights on former slaves, and the 15th Amendment, which gave the vote to African Americans.

== Civil War to civil rights ==
The Civil War impacted the African-Americans in Maryland in several ways with a few large battles and many smaller skirmishes fought in Maryland, but also with the status of the enslaved being bought further into question. Although emancipation would not begin until near the end of the war in Maryland, the possibility for escaped slaves increased during the war and the numbers of contraband swelled with many seeking refuge in D.C. The beginning of the war saw African-Americans pressed into service for manual labor in Union Army camps and building defenses throughout the state, both free men and escape slaves; but others chose to travel to states where they were allowed to enlist. The Slave codes were replaced by the Black codes in restricting the rights of African-Americans until the Jim Crow laws took effect to limit civil rights protections and continue the codified segregation that lasted until the mid-1900s.

Black children were required to attend schools by 1872, but these schools were to be governed by existing county and district boards, which were already struggling to provide adequate education to white children. Maryland was required to pay black and white teachers equally by 1941, based on a case argued by Thurgood Marshall. In 1955, schools in Maryland were forced to start the process of integration with Brown v. Board of Education in 1954 and this process not completed until 1967, with mixed success.

Lynchings such as those of Joseph Vermillion, Michael Green, Matthew Williams, William Burns and Stephen Williams were not unheard of and were used for intimidation affect, with the last recorded lynching occurring in 1933 in Princess Anne, Maryland. Laws criminalizing marriage and sex between white and black people were enacted in colonial era Maryland, and not repealed until just before the Supreme Court ruled on Loving v. Virginia in 1967, further reinforcing segregation in the state.

The 13th Amendment ended slavery and the 14th Amendment extended full rights of citizenship to African Americans. The continuation of support for Jim Crow and segregation laws led to protests in which many African-Americans were violently injured out in the open at lunchroom counters, buses, polling places and local public areas. These protests did not eradicate racism, but they forced racism to become used in more coded or metaphorical language instead of being used out in the open.

== Civil Rights era ==
Following the example of student sit-ins as those in Greensboro, North Carolina, by the spring of 1960, students from Morgan State College began their own sit-in in Baltimore department stores restaurants. While such protests continued in Maryland, by 1961, the Freedom Riders began rolling through the state as they headed further into the deep South, from Washington, D.C. The 1960s continues with rallies, marches, protests and riots with the largest of and most violent happening in 1968 upon hearing of the death of Martin Luther King jr. in 1968. Notable among the unrest is Cambridge riot of 1963, Cambridge riot of 1967 and Baltimore riot of 1968.

== Notable African Americans of Maryland ==
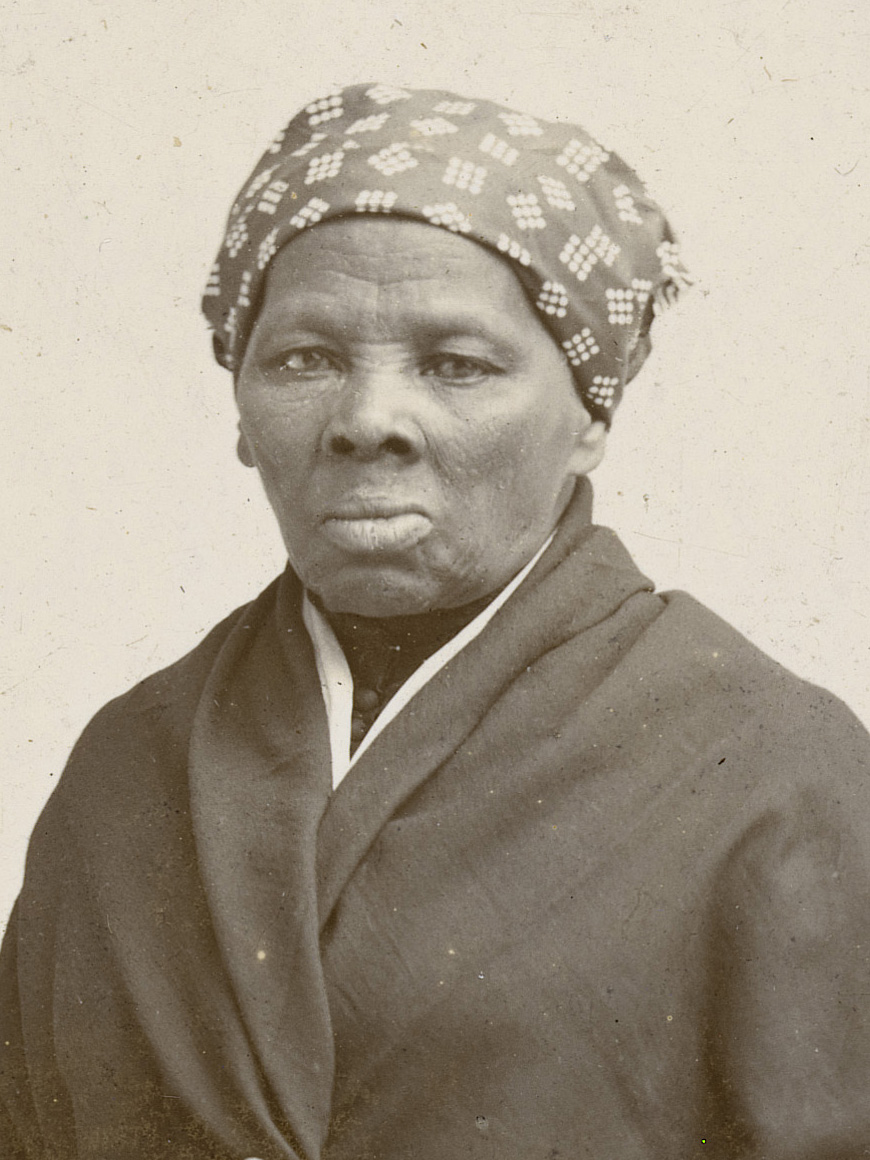
Harriet Tubman

- Freddy Adu
- Benjamin Banneker
- Eubie Blake
- Toni Braxton
- Cab Calloway
- Lewis Charlton, former slave
- Harry A. Cole
- Harry S. Cummings
- Robert Curbeam
- Decatur Dorsey, former slave
- Father Divine
- Frederick Douglass, former slave
- Charles S. Dutton
- Crystal Bird Fauset
- Charity Folks, former slave
- William C. Goodridge, former slave
- Frances Harper
- Josiah Henson, former slave and inspiration for Uncle Tom
- Matthew Henson
- Bryant Johnson
- Delano Johnson
- Joshua Johnson (painter)
- LaKisha Jones
- Mother Mary Lange
- Reginald Lewis
- Thurgood Marshall
- Clarence Mitchell Jr.
- Parren J. Mitchell
- John H. Murphy Sr., former slave
- Pauli Murray
- Isaac Myers
- James W.C. Pennington, former slave
- Hasim Rahman
- Gloria Richardson
- Michael Steele
- Vivien Thomas
- Charles Albert Tindley
- Harriet Tubman, former slave
- Charles Uncles
- Verda Welcome
- Clifton Reginald Wharton Sr.
- Mo'Nique
- Dave Chappelle
- Jada Pinkett Smith
- Wes Moore

== See also ==
- History of the Jews in Maryland
- Native American tribes in Maryland
- Amish in Maryland
- History of the African Americans in Baltimore
- History of slavery in Maryland
- Maryland-in-Africa
- Reginald F. Lewis Museum of Maryland African American History & Culture
- Atlantic Creole
- Chesapeake Colonies
- Colonial South and the Chesapeake
- Slavery in the colonial history of the United States
- Tobacco colonies
- Demographics of Maryland
- List of African-American newspapers in Maryland
- White Americans in Maryland
- Asian Americans in Maryland
- Hispanics and Latinos in Maryland
- Amish in Maryland
- Mennonites in Maryland
- Wesorts
