= White Americans in Maryland =

Ethnic Group

White Marylanders
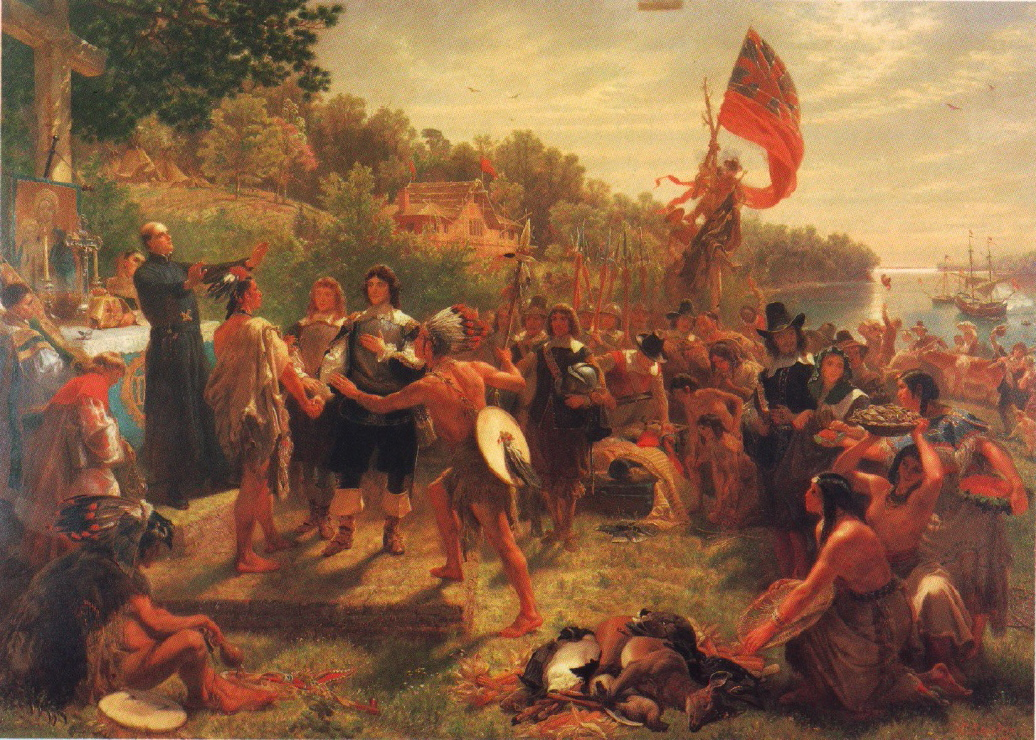

Total population
- Approx. 3.275 million (57.3% - total) (2020)

Regions with significant populations
- Frederick: 67.2% White, 55.2% non-Hispanic white
- Columbia: 53.7% White, 47.7% non-Hispanic white
- Germantown: 46.% White, 30.9% non-Hispanic white
- Silver Spring: 41.1% White, 34.2% non-Hispanic white
- Baltimore: 30.3% White, 27.6% non-Hispanic white

Languages
- American English (Baltimore accent, Tidewater accent), American Spanish, French, Italian, Polish, German, Russian, Persian, Greek, Arabic, Portuguese, American Sign Language

Religion
- Christianity (Mainly Protestantism and Roman Catholicism), Judaism, Irreligion, Atheism, Islam

Related ethnic groups
- White Americans, White Hispanic and Latino Americans

White Marylanders are White Americans living in Maryland. As of 2019, they comprise 57.3% of the state's population. 49.8% of the population is non-Hispanic white, making Maryland a majority minority state.

== Demographics ==
As of 2019, Maryland is 49.8% non-Hispanic white, becoming the first state on the East Coast to become minority-majority. Only the majority-minority states of Hawaii, California, Nevada, New Mexico, and Texas have a smaller percentage of non-Hispanic whites. By 2031, minorities are projected to become the majority of voting eligible residents of Maryland.

Children from minority groups are already the majority of Maryland children. In 2017, 41.6% of live births were to non-Hispanic white mothers.

The top reported ancestries of white Marylanders are: German (15.7%), Irish (11.4%), English (8.5%), American (6.7%), Italian (5.7%), Polish (3.1%), French (2.9%), Dutch (1.5%), Norwegian (1.5%), Scottish (1.8%), Swedish (1.3%), Scotch-Irish (1.1%), and Russian (1%). Smaller white ethnic groups include French-Canadians (0.7%), Welsh (0.6%), Arabs (0.5%), Czechs (0.5%), Danish (0.5%), Hungarians (0.5%), Portuguese (0.5%), Greeks (0.4%), Swiss (0.3%), Ukrainians (0.3%), Lithuanians (0.2%), and Slovaks (0.2%).

== History ==
=== Early European exploration and colonization ===
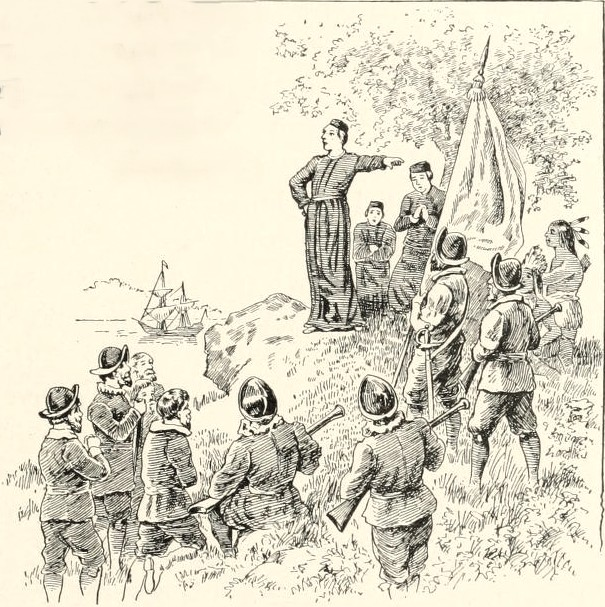
A 1908 textbook depicts the settlement of St. Mary's.

The Spanish were the first Europeans to explore the Maryland region and had contact with Maryland’s Native American tribes.

Before European colonization, The initial people who settled in Maryland were Paleo-Indians who migrated over 10,000 years ago from various regions of North America to pursue mammoths, bison and caribou. By 1,000 B.C., Maryland was home to over 8,000 Native Americans belonging to approximately 40 distinct tribes. The majority communicated in Algonquian languages. They cultivated corn, peas, squash, and tobacco. Additionally, they engaged in hunting, fishing, and trading with tribes located as far away as New York and Ohio. Europeans later wiped out their indigenous. Many Native American tribes in Maryland were killed by Europeans, while others succumbed to diseases brought by Europeans, and those who remained were compelled to abandon their ancestral lands and were relocated by the Europeans.

In 1498 the first European explorers sailed along the Eastern Shore, off present-day Worcester County. In 1524 Giovanni da Verrazzano, sailing under the French flag, passed the mouth of Chesapeake Bay. In 1608 John Smith entered the bay and explored it extensively. His maps still exist today, and although technically crude they are surprisingly accurate given the technology of those times (the maps are ornate but crude by modern technical standards).

The region was depicted in a map by Estêvão Gomes and Diego Gutiérrez, made in 1562, in the context of the Spanish Ajacán Mission of the sixteenth century.

British settlers had sought to reproduce the tobacco and slavery in the tidewater area in Maryland. British settlers such as James Marshall brought enslaved laborers in the state. German settlers had farmed smaller tracts of land. They cultivated corn, wheat and other crops in Maryland.

== Religion ==
The majority of white Marylanders are Christians. As of 2014, 53% of Christians in Maryland were white, down from 57% in 2007. 27% of white Marylanders in 2014 were Mainline Protestants, 19% were Catholics, 18% were Evangelical Protestants, and 6% were Jewish. 1% each of white Marylanders was Mormon and Orthodox Christian. Less than 1% each of white Marylanders were Buddhist, Hindu, Jehovah's Witnesses, or Muslims.

== Politics ==
In the 2020 presidential election, 62% of all voters in Maryland were white. 52% of white voters in Maryland voted for Joe Biden while 46% voted for Donald Trump. By comparison, 88% of voters of color voted for Joe Biden and 11% voted for Donald Trump. By gender, white male voters in Maryland preferred Biden to Trump 50% to 47%, while white women voters preferred Biden to Trump 53% to 45%. White millennials ages 18 to 29 were the most likely to vote for Biden (56%), while middle-aged whites ages 45 to 64 were the most likely to vote for Trump (52%). By religion, white Protestants preferred Trump over Biden by a wide margin (62% to 35%) while white Catholics preferred Trump by a smaller margin (54% to 44%). Non-religious whites preferred Biden over Trump 73% to 23%, while whites of some other religion preferred Biden over Trump (72% to 28%). Urban and suburban whites preferred Biden, while small town and rural whites preferred Trump. Trump won with non-college educated whites, particularly non-college educated white women, while Biden won among college educated whites, particularly college educated white women.

Until the 2022 Maryland gubernatorial election, Maryland only had white Governors in the course of its history. All twelve colonial governors and all sixty-two governors of the State of Maryland preceding Wes Moore had been white men. Republican Michael Steele became Maryland's first non-white and first African-American lieutenant governor in 2003, Democrat Anthony Brown became the second African-American lieutenant governor in 2007, and Republican Boyd Rutherford became the third African-American lieutenant governor in 2015. No white women have served as governor, but Kathleen Kennedy Townsend became Maryland's first white female lieutenant governor in 1995.

== White Supremacy ==
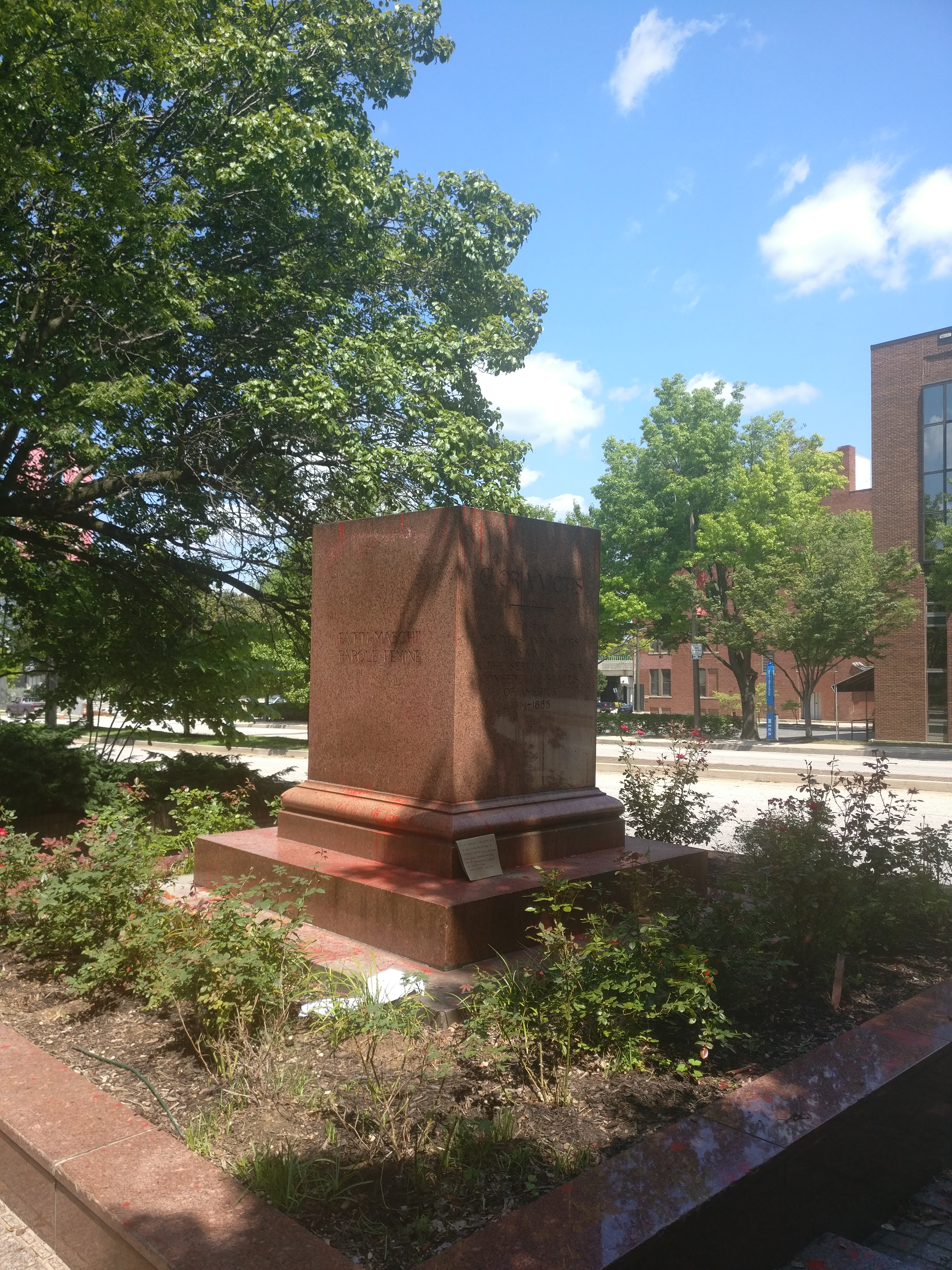
The pedestal in Baltimore after the removal of the Confederate Soldiers and Sailors Monument in 2017

In 1999, Maryland was home to at least a dozen white-supremacist hate groups, including the World Church of the Creator, six chapters of the Ku Klux Klan, the Baltimore branch of the neo-Nazi National Alliance, an Abingdon-based skinhead fraternity known as the Hammerskin Nation, and an Edgewater-based neo-Nazi group called SS Regalia. The Southern Poverty Law Center has identified several white-supremacist hate groups in Maryland as of 2020, including two KKK affiliates: the Noble Klans of America and the Loyal White Knights of the Ku Klux Klan. The number of white supremacist hate groups in Maryland often fluctuates from year to year as groups splinter and recombine. Typically, these white-supremacist hate groups have several dozen members and keep a low profile, although they actively try to recruit new members. The KKK has long been the most active and most visible white racist organization in Maryland, though the influence of the KKK was waning by the 1990s. The KKK had a strong presence in rural Western and Central Maryland in counties such as Carroll, Frederick, Howard, and Washington. The oldest KKK affiliate in Maryland is the Invincible Empire Knights of the Ku Klux Klan, with chapters in Frederick and Washington counties, and which held intermittent rallies in Annapolis. The American Knights of the Ku Klux Klan faction, with chapters in Clinton, Timonium, and Rising Sun, also held rallies in Annapolis during the 1990s.

During the 2010s, Maryland's government began to confront the white-supremacist legacy of lynching. In 2021, Maryland Governor Larry Hogan pardoned 34 African-American victims of lynching who had been murdered between 1854 and 1933, due to activism from the Maryland Lynching Memorial Project and other anti-racist organizations.

All of Maryland's Confederate monuments located on public land were removed during the 2010s, with the last Confederate statue being the Talbot Boys Statue at the Talbot County Courthouse in Easton courthouse. The Talbot County Council voted to remove the Talbot Boys Confederate monument in September, 2021.

== See also ==
- Demographics of Maryland
- History of White Americans in Baltimore
- Majority minority in the United States
- Colonial families of Maryland
- Old Stock Americans
- White Americans in California
- White people
- Amish in Maryland
- Native American tribes in Maryland
- Hispanics and Latinos in Maryland
- History of the Jews in Maryland
- Mennonites in Maryland

== Bibliography ==
- Durr, Kenneth D., Behind the Backlash: White Working-Class Politics in Baltimore, 1940-1980, 2007, The University of North Carolina Press ISBN 0807854336
