= Peter Santenello =

American YouTuber (born 1977)

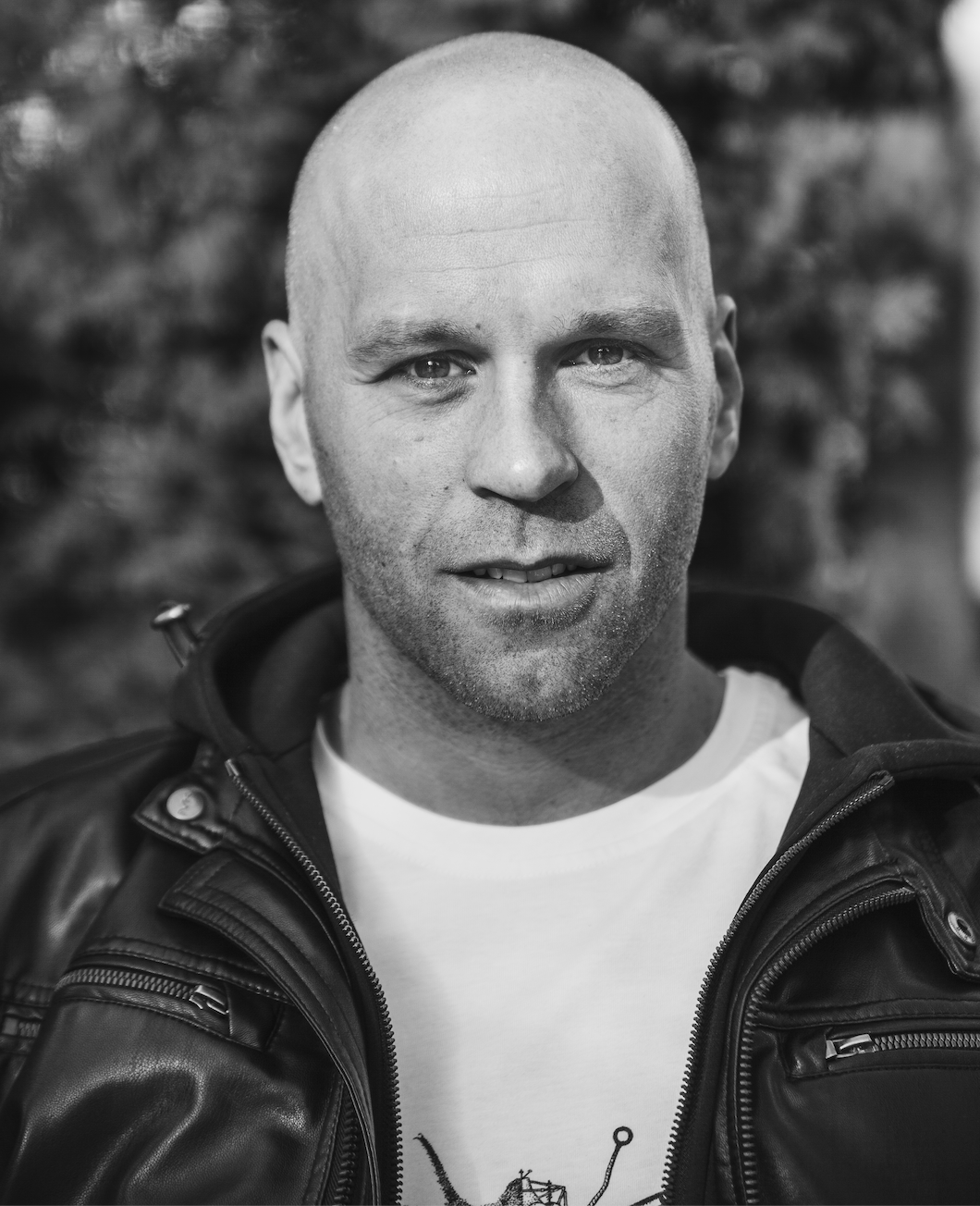
- Santenello in 2018
- Born: September 27, 1977 (age 49); Burlington, Vermont, United States
- Education: University of Nevada (BA)
- Occupations: YouTuber; Video Maker; Author
- Spouse: Natalia

YouTube information
- Channel: Peter Santenello
- Years active: 2017–present
- Genres: Human story; Docu-realism; Journalism; Travel
- Subscribers: 4.3 million
- Views: 870 million
- Last updated: May 28, 2026
- Website: petersantenello.com

Peter Santenello (born September 27, 1977) is an American YouTuber, independent documentarian and media personality. He became a New York Times bestselling author in 2026.

He is best known for producing long-form travel and human-interest documentaries that explore communities, cultures, and regions often overlooked or misunderstood by mainstream media. Through his YouTube channel, Santenello has built one of the largest independent travel-documentary audiences in the world, attracting millions of subscribers through his immersive, on-the-ground storytelling style.

His documentaries have examined subjects ranging from rural America, Amish communities, inner-city America, Native American reservations, wealthy enclaves, back-to-the-land living, and the U.S.-Mexico border. While his work now focuses squarely on America, his documentary approach first developed through projects in Ukraine, Iran, Pakistan, Saudi Arabia, and other regions frequently portrayed through political or geopolitical lenses.

== Biography ==
=== Early life and education ===
Santenello was born in Burlington, Vermont, and was raised in the small town of Panton. Growing up in rural New England during the final years of the Cold War, he developed an early fascination with foreign cultures and international affairs. According to Santenello, his interest in the Soviet Union began during childhood after receiving a book about the country as a Christmas gift. The experience sparked a lifelong curiosity about places and people often portrayed negatively or misunderstood in Western media.

He attended the University of Nevada, where he earned a bachelor's degree. During his early adulthood, he developed interests in entrepreneurship, travel, competitive cycling, and snowboarding.

=== Early career and world travel ===
Before becoming a full-time content creator, Santenello worked in a variety of business and entrepreneurial ventures. At age 24, after saving approximately $20,000, he embarked on what was initially planned as a seven-month trip through Europe. The journey ultimately evolved into a two-year round-the-world adventure during which he visited fifty countries.

The experience transformed his understanding of global cultures and challenged many assumptions he had developed through media portrayals and conventional narratives. Following the trip, Santenello continued traveling extensively and eventually visited more than eighty-five countries while living abroad in multiple nations. These experiences became the foundation for his later documentary career.

=== Move to Ukraine ===
In 2016, Santenello relocated to Ukraine, a move that would significantly influence the direction of his future work. Living in Ukraine allowed him to immerse himself in local culture and document everyday life in regions rarely covered by international media. His early documentary series focused on living with a family displaced by violence in the east of the country. He helped the family dig a well by hand and made a six-video documentary series during his six weeks there.

His Ukrainian content attracted growing attention online and helped establish the storytelling approach that later became his trademark. Rather than relying on narration or expert commentary, Santenello focused on allowing local residents to explain their own experiences directly to viewers.

During his time in Ukraine, he married Natalia, a Ukrainian national.

== YouTube ==
Although Santenello created a YouTube channel in 2009 and uploaded occasional travel clips, his professional content-creation career began in earnest in 2017. Around the age of forty, he decided to focus full-time on video storytelling, later describing the decision as a response to a personal realization that he wanted to turn his passion into his career.

His documentary style differs from traditional travel vlogging. Rather than focusing on tourist attractions, hotels, or sightseeing, Santenello explores local communities through extended conversations with residents. He films independently using only a GoPro, allowing him to capture spontaneous interactions and maintain a low-profile presence.

While most documentarians use voiceover and b-roll, Santenello sticks to a docu-realist format that puts the audience close to the action without voiceover or narration. His wife, Natalia, edits the videos, and together they make up the core production team.

The channel experienced rapid growth during the early 2020s as audiences increasingly sought long-form, independent documentary content. By 2026, Santenello's YouTube channel had accumulated more than four million subscribers and almost a billion views.

== Documentary style and themes ==
A defining characteristic of Santenello's work is his emphasis on direct observation and first-person interaction. His stated philosophy is to present stories without heavy editorial framing and allow viewers to form their own conclusions.

Over the course of his career, he has produced in-depth explorations of Amish communities, Hasidic Jewish neighborhoods, Native American reservations, Appalachian communities, inner-city neighborhoods, rural regions of the United States, back-to-the-land lifestyles, and towns along the U.S.–Mexico border. Internationally, his work has examined post-Soviet societies and countries in the Middle East undergoing significant social, political, and economic change.

Through direct conversations with residents, Santenello seeks to provide viewers with firsthand perspectives that often differ from prevailing media narratives and public perceptions. This docu-realist approach has become one of the defining features of his work.

== Publications ==
In 2026, Santenello announced the publication of his first book, Your Fellow Americans: Dispatches from Across the Country We Call Home, published by Simon & Schuster. The book became an instant New York Times bestseller.

== Reception ==
Santenello has been recognized as part of a growing generation of independent digital creators who blend elements of travel journalism, documentary filmmaking, and social commentary. His work has attracted audiences interested in cultural exploration, regional diversity, and perspectives outside conventional media coverage.

Observers have noted that his success reflects broader changes in media consumption, where independent creators increasingly produce long-form documentary content for global audiences without relying on traditional television networks or news organizations.

== Personal life ==
Santenello has spent his adult life living outside his home state of Vermont, including the majority of his adult years on the West Coast of the United States as well as abroad in Switzerland, Spain, Thailand, and Ukraine. He has traveled to more than eighty-five countries and has stated that international travel fundamentally shaped his worldview and video-making philosophy.
