= Upper Marlboro, Maryland =

- Town
- Town of Upper Marlboro
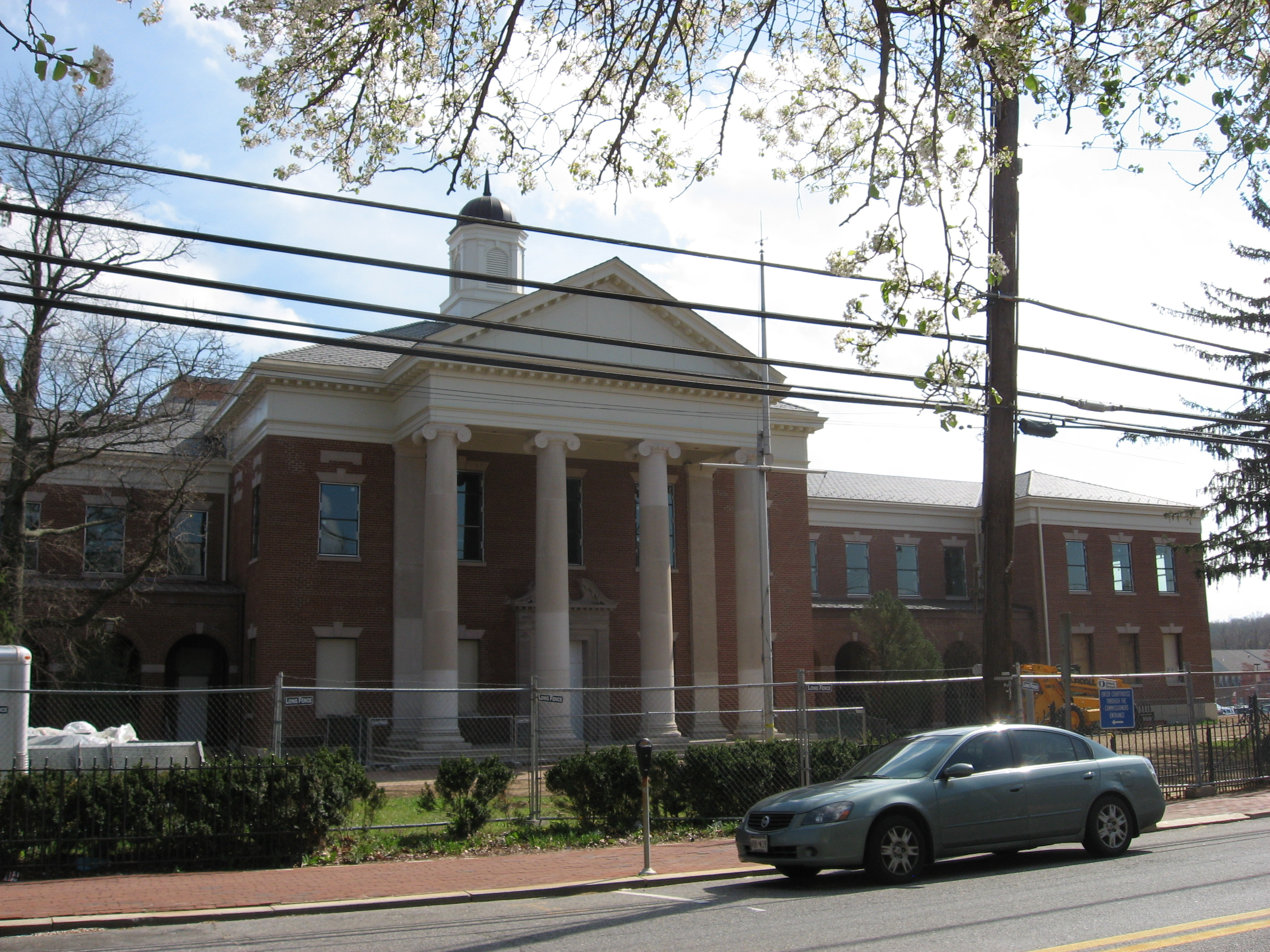
- The Upper Marlboro courthouse under renovation in 2008.

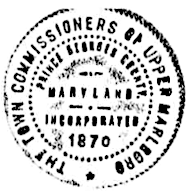
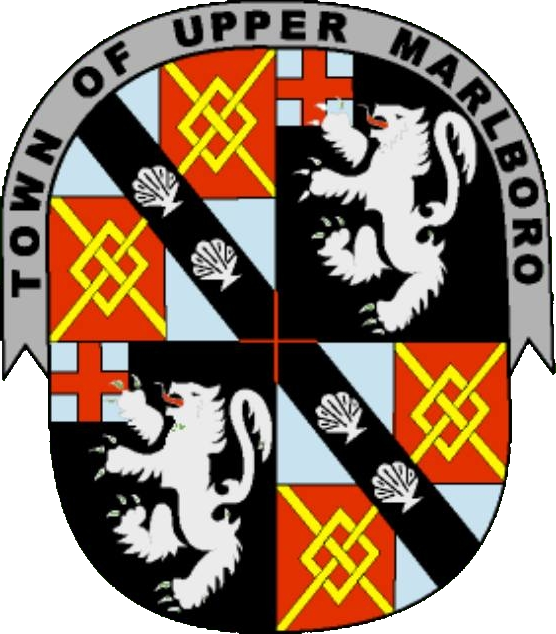
- Flag Seal Coat of arms Logo
- Motto: "Where the Star Spangled Banner began!"
- Location of Upper Marlboro, Maryland
- Coordinates: 38°48′59″N 76°45′12″W
- Country: United States
- State: Maryland
- County: Prince George's
- Settled: 1695
- Established: 1706 (as Marlborough Town)
- Replatted: 1744 (as Upper Marlborough)
- Incorporated: 1870
- Founder: Kingdom of England
- Named for: John Churchill, 1st Duke of Marlborough

Government
  - Type: Commission

Area
  - Total: 0.74 sq mi (1.91 km^{2})
  - Land: 0.69 sq mi (1.79 km^{2})
  - Water: 0.046 sq mi (0.12 km^{2})
- Elevation: 23 ft (7 m)

Population (2020)
  - Total: 652
  - Density: 945.8/sq mi (365.17/km^{2})
- Time zone: UTC-5 (Eastern (EST))
  - Summer (DST): UTC-4 (EDT)
- ZIP Codes: 20772, 20773, 20792
- Area codes: 301, 240
- FIPS code: 24-79875
- GNIS feature ID: 0598208
- Website: www.uppermarlboromd.gov

Upper Marlboro, officially the Town of Upper Marlboro, is a town in and the county seat of Prince George's County, Maryland, United States. As of the 2020 census, the population within the town limits was 652, although Greater Upper Marlboro, which covers a large area outside the town limits, is many times larger.

== Etymology ==
Upper Marlboro was established in 1706 as "Marlborough Town", after John Churchill, 1st Duke of Marlborough, whose heraldic arms is depicted on town insignia. In 1744, the town was renamed to "Upper Marlborough". In the late 19th century, the town's name changed from Upper Marlborough to Upper Marlboro. The name change is linked to a postal clerk who felt that the last three letters, "ugh", did not properly fit on the rubber stamps being used at the time. By 1893, postal guides were referring to the town as Upper Marlboro, though it took several more decades for the new spelling to become widely accepted among residents. Even as late as 1925, the old spelling still saw widespread unofficial usage. Despite a proposed ballot to have it formally changed back in 1968, the new name stuck, and by 1971, the old spelling, while not completely vanquished, had become severely deprecated.

== History ==
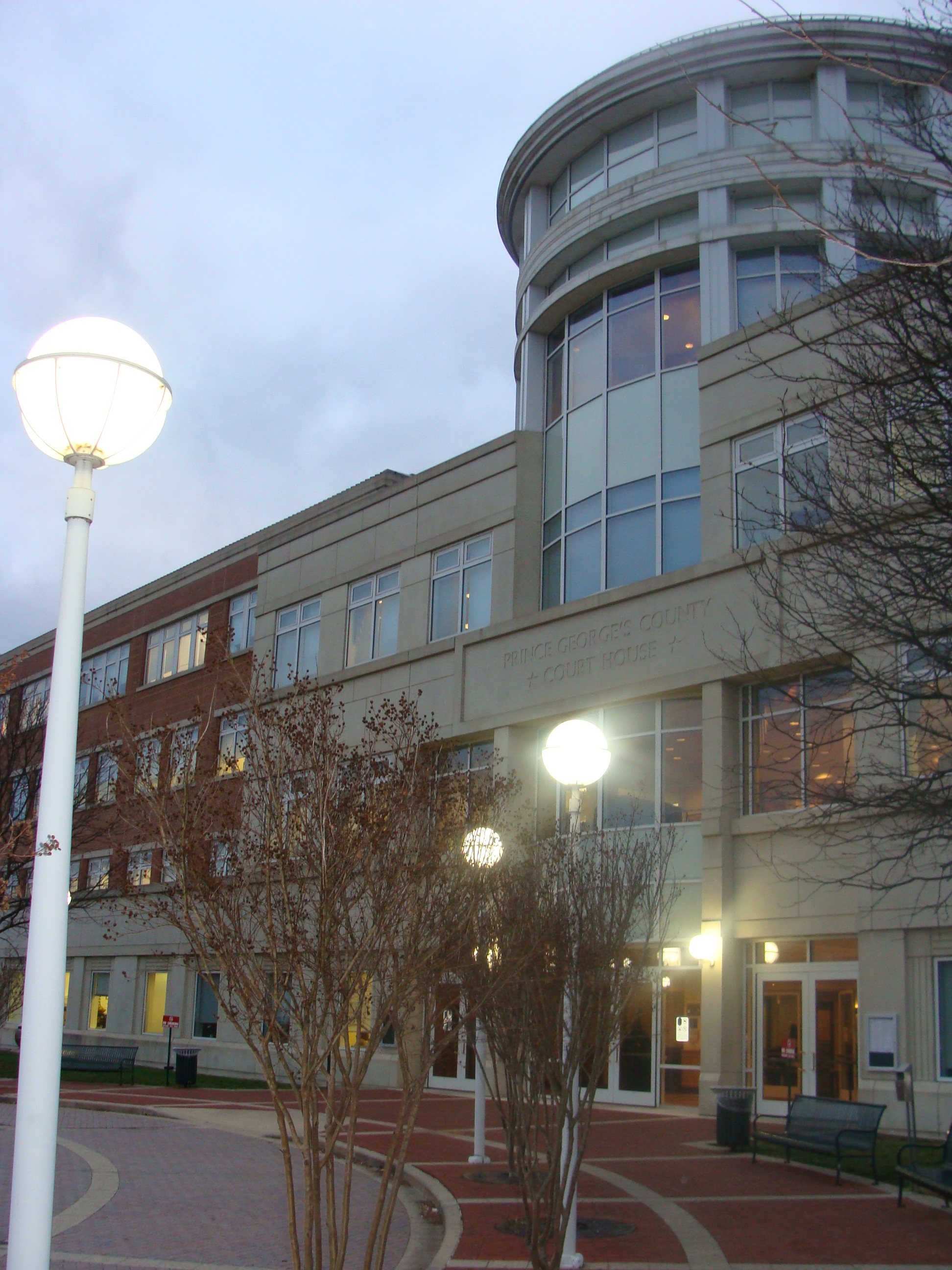
The main entrance to the Prince George's County courthouse in December 2008

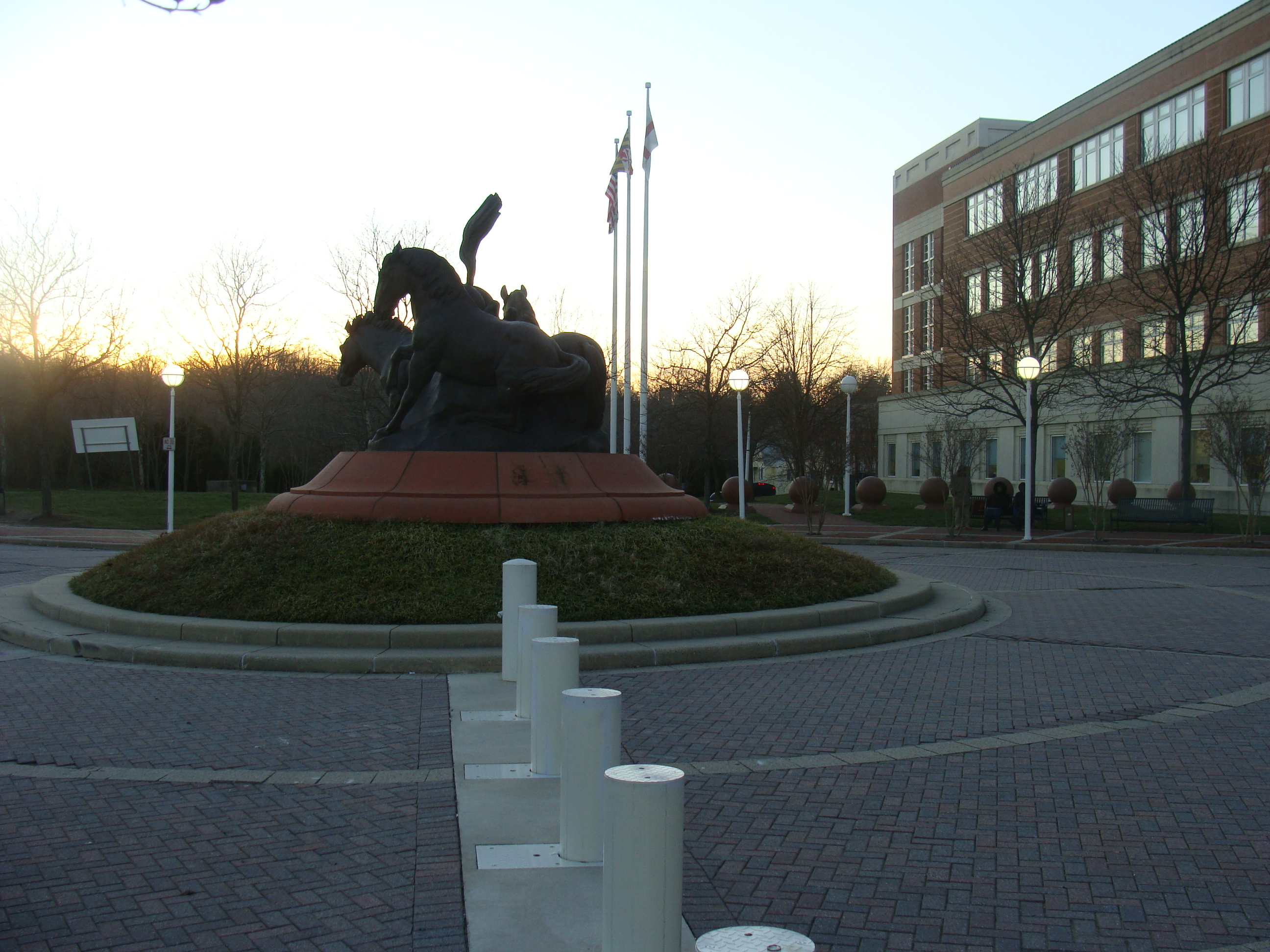
The Three Horse Statue featured prominently in front of the county courthouse in December 2008

The area of Upper Marlboro was first settled around 1695. It was named after John Churchill, 1st Duke of Marlborough, an ancestor of Winston Churchill. The land, which was to become the town, was part of several estates known as Grove Landing, Meadows, and Darnall's Chance, owned by the Brooke, Beall, and Darnall families, respectively.

Darnall's Chance, also known as the Buck House, Buck-Wardrop House, or James Wardrop House, is a historic home located at 14800 Governor Oden Bowie Drive, in Upper Marlboro. It is named after Colonel Henry Darnall, a wealthy Roman Catholic planter, who was the Proprietary Agent of Charles Calvert, 3rd Baron Baltimore and who served for a time as Deputy Governor of the Province. The house itself was built c. 1742 by a merchant named James Wardrop, after he bought some of the land from Eleanor Darnall Carroll and her husband. Today, Darnall's Chance houses the Darnall's Chance House Museum, an historic house museum that opened to the public in 1988.

In 1706, Marlborough Town was established as a port town by the Act for the Advancement of Trade and Erecting Ports and Towns. It was declared that the town would be constructed, "at the upper landing on the Western Branch, commonly called Colonel Belt's landing." County surveyor Thomas Truman Greenfield conducted a survey of 100 acres (0.40 km^{2}) of the three estates from which the town would be formed. Streets, alleys, a meetinghouse, lots for small businesses, and 100 lots to be used for homes were laid out. The earliest plans showed the town being laid out in a grid pattern with an L shape. In 1718 residents asked the county government's general assembly, then based in Charles Town, via petition to move the county seat to Upper Marlboro. The county seat has been there since that time.

Residents of the area were not happy with Greenfield's initial layout and petitioned the General Assembly to have the town replatted. In 1744, the new survey was approved and the town was given a new name, Upper Marlborough. Upper was added to distinguish the town from the community of Marlboro (now known as Lower Marlboro) in Calvert County.

Early in its life, when the western branch of the Patuxent River was still navigable, the town served as a port town for tobacco ships. The town blossomed into an agricultural, social, and political hot spot. Farms, many of which raised tobacco, dominated the surrounding areas.

In 1721, a courthouse was constructed in the town. The county seat was then moved from Charles Town, on the banks of the Patuxent, to Upper Marlborough. The courthouse was built with money from a 12-pound tobacco tax imposed on county inhabitants. One of the first laws passed at the courthouse was the Public School Act, which established a public school system.

In 1814, Upper Marlboro was seized by British forces under the command of Major-General Robert Ross and Rear Admiral George Cockburn during the campaign leading up to the Battle of Bladensburg and the Burning of Washington.

During the late 18th and early 19th centuries, many prominent merchants, lawyers, and politicians lived and worked in the area. Horse racing came to the town around the mid-18th century and attracted many people from the surrounding areas. The Maryland Jockey Club sponsored spring and summer races at the race track south of town, and racing continued there until 1972, when they were moved to the Bowie Race Track. The race track is now part of the Equestrian Center owned by Prince George's County.

In 1870, the town was incorporated by the Maryland General Assembly. A volunteer fire department was organized in 1886, and the Marlborough Fire Association was incorporated the following year.

In 1878, Michael Green, an African-American man accused of assaulting a white woman, was taken from the country jail and hanged from a tree outside of town. An "iron bridge just between the town and the railroad depot" was the site of two more lynchings. Joseph Vermillion was killed there in 1889 and Stephen Williams met the same fate in 1894.

Since its initial conception, the town has changed quite a bit. It initially boomed as a port town for tobacco trade, but the clearing and cultivation of land for farming would lead to erosion in the area. Over the years this erosion caused sedimentation, leading the Western Branch to become unnavigable. The fields of tobacco that once dominated the area have been converted over to residential developments, with the number of farms dwindling each year.

As it is Prince George's county seat, located within the town are the Prince George's County Courthouse, County Administration Building, the Board of Education, and the headquarters of the Prince George's County Sheriff's Office. The town's atmosphere is remarkably different, depending on the time of day.

=== Prince George's County courthouse ===
The courthouse has been a critical part of the town since it became the county seat in 1721. Since then, the courthouse in Upper Marlboro has seen many changes. Between 1798 and 1801, a new courthouse was constructed on the site of the old one. The courthouse was again rebuilt in the 1880s.

In 1939, the courthouse was substantially expanded and rebuilt. During this time, the building gained its famous stone Ionic columns. According to county historian Susan Pearl, "They wanted the neo-classic Georgian university campus building, and that's what they got." The total cost of the revision was $178,000.

Small additions were made in 1947 and 1969.

In the early 1990s, a new courthouse was erected behind the existing courthouse. The new courthouse, composed of the Marbury and Bourne wing, was completed in 1991. The new building occupies 360,000 square feet (33,000 m^{2}) of space and cost $80 million. The old courthouse was then designated as the Duvall Wing and was attached to the new section by walkways.

In May 2003, the old courthouse was closed for a $25 million renovation. On November 3, 2004, two months before the building was scheduled to reopen, a fire broke out and destroyed much of the 151,000-square-foot (14,000 m^{2}) building. The fire left only a charred skeleton of the cupola, which had overlooked Main Street for 64 years.

In January 2007, the courthouse briefly caught fire again when sparks from a construction worker's welding tool ignited building materials on the roof. Firefighters quickly contained the blaze, and the renovations continued.

On March 12, 2009, the Duvall Wing of the Prince George's County Courthouse reopened after being closed in 2001 for renovations.

=== Proposed move to Largo ===
Since the 1990s, the Prince George's County government has been purchasing land in Largo, Maryland, due to its convenient location near the Washington Metro and interstate highways. In 2015, County Executive Rushern Baker recommended the move of the county's seat from Upper Marlboro to Largo so that residents could be better served.

== Geography ==
Upper Marlboro is located at 38°48′59″N 76°45′12″W (38.816488, −76.753454).

According to the United States Census Bureau, the town has a total area of 0.43 square miles (1.11 km^{2}), of which 0.40 square miles (1.04 km^{2}) is land and 0.03 square miles (0.08 km^{2}) is water.

Upper Marlboro is the county seat of Prince George's County, a large urban and suburban area of some 850,000 people adjacent to Washington. U.S. Route 301 and Maryland Route 4 intersect at the edge of town. The northern terminus of the Stephanie Roper Highway (Maryland Route 4) is in Upper Marlboro at the intersection of Pennsylvania Avenue and Water Street. Major features of the town include the courthouse, jail, county office building, board of education, and a lake with a walking path. Just to the south of town is the Prince George's Equestrian Center which is the location of the annual county fair, a major annual antiques show and The Show Place Arena on the former Marlboro racetrack grounds. This arena is used for events such as hockey games, circuses, rodeos, conventions, trade shows, and graduation ceremonies of many regional high schools, as well as daily overflow parking for county governmental employees, jurors, and visitors.

Although the surrounding area has many rural, pastoral features, including horse farms, housing developments are increasingly prevalent. The Town of Upper Marlboro is quite small and often confused with the large surrounding unincorporated area known as Greater Upper Marlboro. Greater Upper Marlboro has a population of nearly 20,000 in an area of 77 square miles (200 km^{2}), as designated by the post office.

=== Climate ===
The climate in this area is characterized by hot, humid summers and generally mild to cool winters. According to the Köppen Climate Classification system, Upper Marlboro has a humid subtropical climate, abbreviated "Cfa" on climate maps.

Climate data for Upper Marlboro, Maryland (1991–2020 normals, extremes 1956–present)
Month	Jan	Feb	Mar	Apr	May	Jun	Jul	Aug	Sep	Oct	Nov	Dec	Year
Record high °F (°C)	75 (24)	80 (27)	89 (32)	95 (35)	97 (36)	104 (40)	105 (41)	102 (39)	99 (37)	93 (34)	85 (29)	80 (27)	105 (41)
Mean maximum °F (°C)	67 (19)	68 (20)	77 (25)	87 (31)	90 (32)	95 (35)	97 (36)	95 (35)	91 (33)	84 (29)	76 (24)	67 (19)	98 (37)
Mean daily maximum °F (°C)	43.9 (6.6)	46.8 (8.2)	54.7 (12.6)	66.5 (19.2)	74.8 (23.8)	83.5 (28.6)	88.0 (31.1)	86.3 (30.2)	79.9 (26.6)	68.8 (20.4)	58.0 (14.4)	48.0 (8.9)	66.6 (19.2)
Daily mean °F (°C)	34.3 (1.3)	36.4 (2.4)	43.8 (6.6)	55.0 (12.8)	64.1 (17.8)	73.1 (22.8)	77.7 (25.4)	75.8 (24.3)	69.0 (20.6)	57.2 (14.0)	46.7 (8.2)	38.4 (3.6)	56.0 (13.3)
Mean daily minimum °F (°C)	24.7 (−4.1)	25.9 (−3.4)	32.8 (0.4)	43.5 (6.4)	53.5 (11.9)	62.7 (17.1)	67.3 (19.6)	65.3 (18.5)	58.2 (14.6)	45.6 (7.6)	35.5 (1.9)	28.8 (−1.8)	45.3 (7.4)
Mean minimum °F (°C)	8 (−13)	11 (−12)	17 (−8)	29 (−2)	38 (3)	50 (10)	57 (14)	55 (13)	44 (7)	31 (−1)	22 (−6)	15 (−9)	6 (−14)
Record low °F (°C)	−12 (−24)	−8 (−22)	2 (−17)	18 (−8)	28 (−2)	39 (4)	43 (6)	39 (4)	30 (−1)	20 (−7)	13 (−11)	1 (−17)	−12 (−24)
Average precipitation inches (mm)	2.96 (75)	2.66 (68)	3.92 (100)	3.38 (86)	4.11 (104)	4.20 (107)	4.22 (107)	4.12 (105)	4.51 (115)	4.13 (105)	3.25 (83)	3.55 (90)	45.01 (1,143)
Average snowfall inches (cm)	5.7 (14)	6.3 (16)	1.7 (4.3)	0 (0)	0 (0)	0 (0)	0 (0)	0 (0)	0 (0)	0 (0)	0 (0)	2.2 (5.6)	15.9 (40)
Average extreme snow depth inches (cm)	5 (13)	5 (13)	2 (5.1)	0 (0)	0 (0)	0 (0)	0 (0)	0 (0)	0 (0)	0 (0)	0 (0)	2 (5.1)	7 (18)
Average precipitation days (≥ 0.01 in)	10	9	10	10	10	10	10	9	8	8	8	10	112
Average snowy days (≥ 0.1 in)	3	3	1	0	0	0	0	0	0	0	0	1	8
Source: NOAA

=== Bodies of water ===
Inside of the city of Upper Marlboro, there are three bodies of water: Federal Spring Branch, Western Branch Patuxent River, and School House Pond. Federal Spring Branch flows into the Western Branch Patuxent River nearby Main Street, Upper Marlboro. School House Pond is to the south of the other two bodies.

==== Federal Spring Branch ====
The branch is approximately two miles long and starts approximately one mile to the west of Upper Marlboro. It splits into four unnamed steams, that join later on. The only bridge over the branch is Old Marlboro Pike, or Maryland Route 725.

==== School House Pond ====
School House Pond is a small pond north of Main Street, yet south of Federal Spring Branch. The pond is 4.9 hectares (12 acres) in size, with a 0.75-mile boardwalk around the edge. There is also a walking trail through the small forested area north of the pond. The largest attraction at the pond is fishing. The pond is restocked with 800 trout a year.

==== Western Branch Patuxent River ====
The Western Branch Patuxent River is one of the largest tributaries of the Patuxent River. Its flow starts in Woodmore, Maryland, and enters the Patuxent River just a few miles south of Upper Marlboro. The river's largest tributary south of Upper Marlboro is Collington Branch, which flows into the Western Branch Patuxent River just before entering the Patuxent.

== Demographics ==
Historical population
Census	Pop.	Note	%±
1870	42		—
1880	541		1,188.1%
1890	439		−18.9%
1900	449		2.3%
1910	361		−19.6%
1920	385		6.6%
1930	420		9.1%
1940	565		34.5%
1950	702		24.2%
1960	673		−4.1%
1970	646		−4.0%
1980	828		28.2%
1990	745		−10.0%
2000	648		−13.0%
2010	631		−2.6%
2020	652		3.3%
U.S. Decennial Census; 2010 2020

=== Racial and ethnic composition ===
Upper Marlboro town, Maryland – Racial and ethnic composition Note: the US Census treats Hispanic/Latino as an ethnic category. This table excludes Latinos from the racial categories and assigns them to a separate category. Hispanics/Latinos may be of any race.
Race / Ethnicity (NH = Non-Hispanic)	Pop 2000	Pop 2010	Pop 2020	% 2000	% 2010	% 2020
White alone (NH)	330	209	167	50.93%	33.12%	25.61%
Black or African American alone (NH)	290	363	387	44.75%	57.53%	59.36%
Native American or Alaska Native alone (NH)	3	1	5	0.46%	0.16%	0.77%
Asian alone (NH)	6	7	6	0.93%	1.11%	0.92%
Native Hawaiian or Pacific Islander alone (NH)	0	0	0	0.00%	0.00%	0.00%
Other race alone (NH)	1	1	10	0.15%	0.16%	1.53%
Mixed race or Multiracial (NH)	8	24	25	1.23%	3.80%	3.83%
Hispanic or Latino (any race)	10	26	52	1.54%	4.12%	7.98%
Total	648	631	652	100.00%	100.00%	100.00%

=== 2020 census ===
As of the 2020 census, the population within the town limits was 652,

As of 2015, about 6,000 people work in the town, with employees of the Prince George's County government making up the majority.

=== 2010 census ===
As of the census of 2010, there were 631 people, 290 households, and 157 families residing in the town. The population density was 1,577.5 inhabitants per square mile (609.1/km^{2}). There were 310 housing units at an average density of 775.0 per square mile (299.2/km^{2}). The racial makeup of the town was 33.8% White, 57.8% African American, 0.2% Native American, 1.1% Asian, 2.9% from other races, and 4.3% from two or more races. Hispanic or Latino of any race were 4.1% of the population.

There were 290 households, of which 29.0% had children under the age of 18 living with them, 34.1% were married couples living together, 17.6% had a female householder with no husband present, 2.4% had a male householder with no wife present, and 45.9% were non-families. 36.9% of all households were made up of individuals, and 11% had someone living alone who was 65 years of age or older. The average household size was 2.18 and the average family size was 2.88.

The median age in the town was 39.5 years. 21.1% of residents were under the age of 18; 7.1% were between the ages of 18 and 24; 32.1% were from 25 to 44; 30% were from 45 to 64; and 9.7% were 65 years of age or older. The gender makeup of the town was 47.4% male and 52.6% female.

=== 2000 census ===
As of the census of 2000, there were 648 people, 292 households, and 165 families residing in the town. The population density was 1,586.7 inhabitants per square mile (612.6/km^{2}). There were 309 housing units at an average density of 756.6 per square mile (292.1/km^{2}). The racial makeup of the town was 51.54% White, 45.06% African American, 0.46% Native American, 1.08% Asian, 0.15% from other races, and 1.70% from two or more races. Hispanic or Latino of any race were 1.54% of the population.

There were 292 households, out of which 31.8% had children under the age of 18 living with them, 29.5% were married couples living together, 22.9% had a female householder with no husband present, and 43.2% were non-families. 34.2% of all households were made up of individuals, and 8.6% had someone living alone who was 65 years of age or older. The average household size was 2.21 and the average family size was 2.86.

In the town, the population was spread out, with 23.9% under the age of 18, 6.9% from 18 to 24, 36.3% from 25 to 44, 23.1% from 45 to 64, and 9.7% who were 65 years of age or older. The median age was 37 years. For every 100 females, there were 72.8 males. For every 100 females age 18 and over, there were 75.4 males.

The median income for a household in the town was $52,813, and the median income for a family was $58,542. Males had a median income of $42,639 versus $39,000 for females. The per capita income for the town was $28,892. About 1.3% of families and 1.4% of the population were below the poverty line, including none of those under age 18 and 4.0% of those age 65 or over.

== Economy ==
Upper Marlboro's economy consists of small businesses, with a majority of employment opportunities in the city in the courthouse. There are 26 shops and restaurants in Upper Marlboro, 22 of which are small businesses. The courthouse makes up a large amount of revenue for the city. The Enquirer-Gazette is the city's weekly newspaper.

== Government ==
The town has three departments:

- General Government:
- Public Safety: consists of the Upper Marlboro Police Department (UMPD), which is the primary law enforcement agency serving the municipality of Upper Marlboro. The UMPD is also aided by the Prince George's County Police and Sheriff's Office as directed by authority.
- Public Works: The department has traditionally been divided into Highways and Streets and Sanitation.

Prince George's County Police Department District 2 Station in Brock Hall CDP, with a Bowie postal address, serves the community. The area immediately to the south is served by District 5 Station in Clinton CDP.

The U.S. Postal Service operates the Upper Marlboro Post Office.

=== Education ===
Residents are zoned to schools in the Prince George's County Public Schools system. The following schools serve the Upper Marlboro town limits: Barack Obama Elementary School, James Madison Middle School, and Dr. Henry A. Wise, Jr. High School. Wise High, located in the Westphalia census-designated place near Upper Marlboro, opened in 2006. Obama Elementary, also in Westphalia CDP, was the first school in the Washington, D.C., area that was named after the former president. It opened in 2010, next to Wise High.

Public schools in the nearby area include:

- Barack Obama Elementary School
- Kettering Elementary School
- Mattaponi Elementary School
- Marlton Elementary School
- Melwood Elementary School
- Perrywood Elementary School
- Patuxent Elementary School
- Dr. Henry A. Wise Jr. High School
- Frederick Douglass High School
- Largo High School

Private schools in the nearby area include:

- Riverdale Baptist
- Fairhaven School
- Excellence Christian School
- Rock Creek Christian Academy

Upper Marlboro is served by the Upper Marlboro Branch of the Prince George's County Memorial Library System.

==== African-American schools ====
In the era of Jim Crow laws and legalized racial segregation of schools, before the mid-20th century Civil Rights Movement, white and black students attended separate schools. Beginning around 1868 the Upper Marlboro area had a school for African-American children. In the Upper Marlboro area, white students attended Upper Marlboro High School after it was built in 1921. Prior to 1923 area black high school students traveled to Baltimore or Washington, D.C., to go to high school. From 1923 to 1935, Black students attended Marlboro Colored High School in Upper Marboro. After Marlboro Colored High School closed in 1935, and Frederick Douglass High School was opened on a new campus.

=== Sports ===
The Chesapeake Icebreakers of the East Coast Hockey League played two seasons in Upper Marlboro from 1997 to 1999 at The Show Place Arena, just outside town, before moving to Jackson, Mississippi.

The Chesapeake Tide of the Continental Indoor Football League started play at The Show Place Arena, just outside town, in 2007. Beginning in 2009, they will be known as the Maryland Maniacs and play in the Indoor Football League.

== Transportation ==
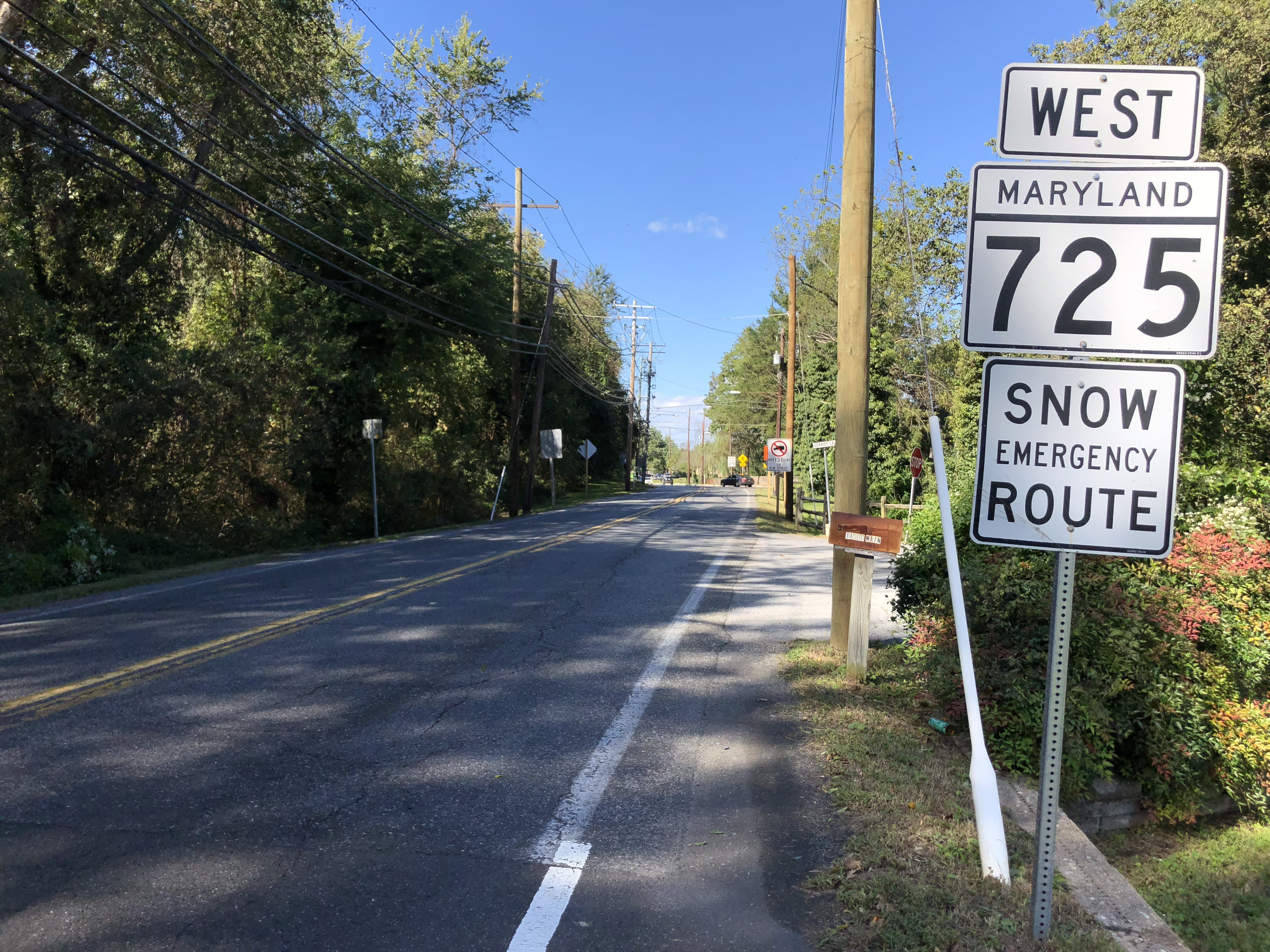
MD 725, the main highway through Upper Marlboro

Upper Marlboro is currently directly served by two state highways. Maryland Route 725 follows Main Street through downtown and connects the town to U.S. Route 301. MD 725 is the old alignment of Maryland Route 4, which currently bypasses the town just to the south. Maryland Route 717 connects MD 725 in downtown to MD 4 via Water Street. US 301 passes just east of the town.

== Notable people ==
- Matai Akinmboni (born 2006), soccer player
- Bryon Allen (born 1992), basketball player for Hapoel Eilat of the Israeli Basketball Premier League
- Angela Alsobrooks (born 1971), U.S. Senator; former Prince George's County Executive and State's Attorney
- Kay Banjo (born 1992), soccer player
- Jonathan Boucher, a loyalist English clergyman, teacher, preacher, and philologist at St. Barnabas Church, Upper Marlboro, Maryland
- Thomas Fielder Bowie (1808–1869), U.S. congressman
- John Carroll, S.J. (1735–1815), first Roman Catholic bishop and archbishop in the United States and founder of Georgetown University
- Thomas J. Clagett (1742–1816), first Episcopal bishop consecrated in the United States
- William H. Clagett (1838–1901), U.S. Congressman from the Montana Territory, born in Upper Marlboro
- Jeff Dowtin Professional basketball player for the NBA.
- Markelle Fultz (born 1998), basketball player, first player selected in the 2017 NBA draft; born in Upper Marlboro
- Michael Green, an African-American man lynched after being forcibly removed from the jail in Upper Marlboro, September 1, 1878
- Khyree Jackson, footballer, born and died in Upper Marlboro
- Charles Clagett Marbury, judge, Maryland Court of Appeals; Maryland State Senator; Maryland House of Delegates
- Victor Oladipo (born 1992), basketball player
- Thomas George Pratt (1804-1869), 27th Governor of Maryland
- Lamont Roach Jr. (born 1995), Professional boxer
- John Rogers (1723-1789), Maryland delegate to the Continental Congress
- Lansdale Ghiselin Sasscer, U.S. Congressman for Maryland's 5th District, born in Upper Marlboro in 1893
- Lansdale Ghiselin Sasscer, Jr., former member of the Maryland House of Delegates
- Marcus Thornton (basketball, born 1993)
- Melo Trimble (born 1995), basketball player for the Iowa Wolves
- Joseph Vermillion, a white man, lynched in Upper Marlboro on December 3, 1889
- Stephen Williams, an African-American man, lynched in Upper Marlboro on October 20, 1894
- Chase Young (born 1999), American football player

== See also ==
- Greater Upper Marlboro, Maryland
