= Mathias de Sousa =

17th-century Maryland colonist of African descent

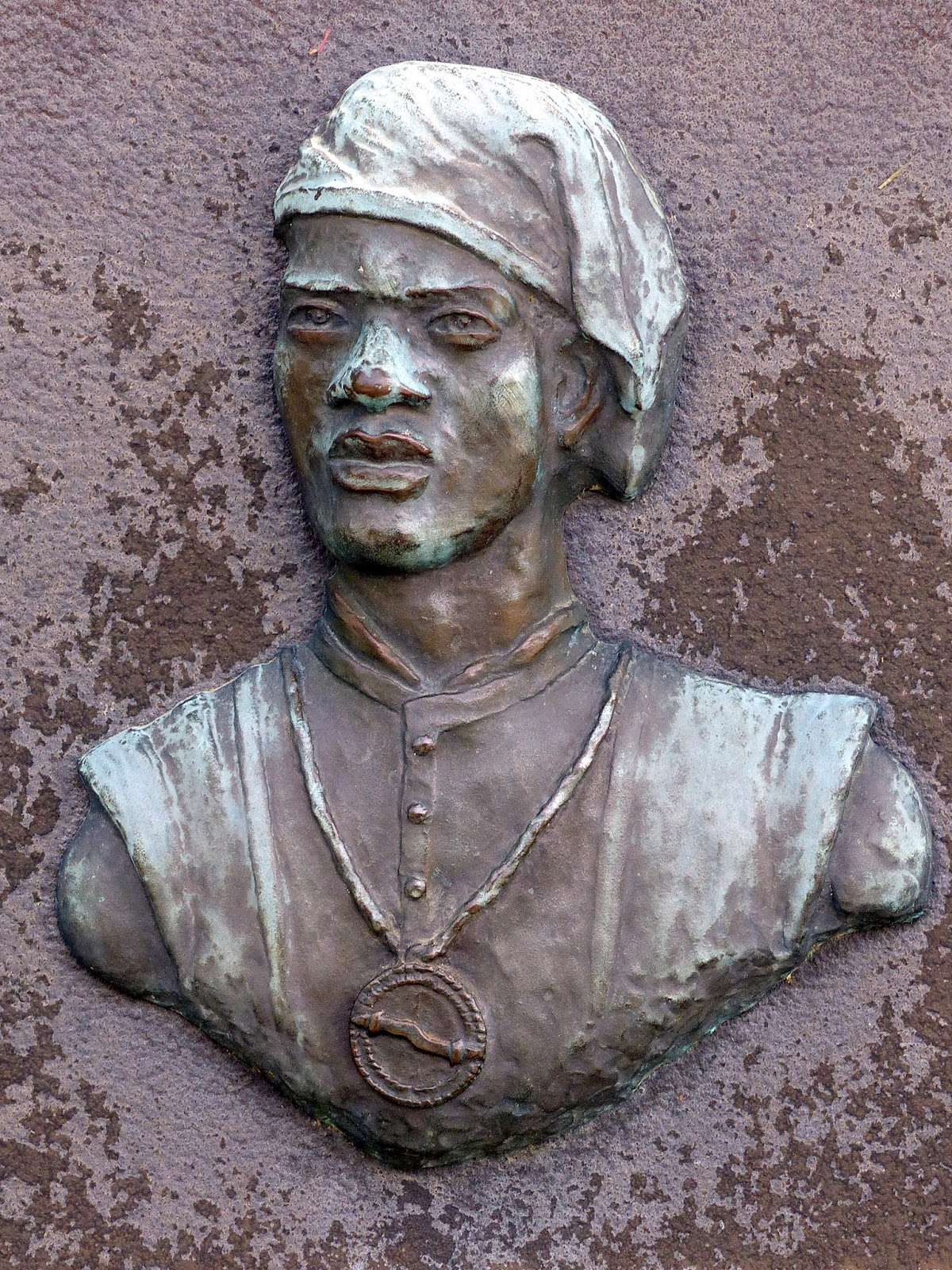
- Bronze relief within a 1987 monument
- Other name: Matthias Sousa [sic]
- Occupations: Fur trader, mariner, indentured servant

Member of Province of Maryland General Assembly
- Incumbent
- Assumed office 1641

Mathias de Sousa (fl. 1633) was an early settler of the Province of Maryland and is often cited as the first person of African descent to vote in an American legislature, owing to his presence at a 1641 Maryland Assembly meeting. De Sousa came to Maryland as an indentured servant of Jesuit priests, who identified him as being a "molato" in a pair of land claim documents.

De Sousa's racial, ethnic, and religious backgrounds, which were largely reduced to a contemporary understanding of the word "mulatto" in the 20th century, is still debated among academics, although he is largely believed to have been of mixed Portuguese and African background.

== Life ==
De Sousa arrived in colonial Maryland, likely in 1633 as an indentured servant of Father Andrew White, a Jesuit priest. De Sousa was referred to as a "molato" in a 1639 document written by Father Ferdinand Poulton, who was requesting land be allocated to his Jesuit order. A second document repeating this request once again listed de Sousa as a "molato". The six other documented mentions of de Sousa in the historical record, five of which were made by an English court recorder, do not make any mention of his race or ethnic background.

On March 23, 1641, de Sousa was recorded as having been present at a Maryland Assembly meeting. According to University of Maryland law professor David S. Bogan:

De Sousa's absence from the earlier meetings raises the possibility that he was merely a spectator or a witness in one of the cases decided by the provincial court, but the records contain no reference that might suggest persons listed as assembled were not freemen. Laws passed in the afternoon session were stated to be "passed by all." Consequently, de Sousa's recorded presence in the list of persons assembled on the afternoon of March 23 indicates his status as a free man voting on the laws passed at that time.

That same year, de Sousa was recorded as being responsible for the hiring of men for an expedition to trade fur with the Susquehanna. He also served as the skipper of the expedition's pinnace. In 1642, de Sousa and his employee John Prettiman were indentured to the Provincial Secretary, John Lewger, for debts likely incurred from the fur trading expeditions. There is no historical mention of de Sousa following 1643.

De Sousa has often been assumed to have been Catholic, although some sources have speculated him to be a Sephardic Jew.

== Legacy ==
A historical marker has been erected in St. Mary's City in St. Mary's County, Maryland.

The actor Denzel Washington spent the summer of 1976 in the city of St. Mary's in summer stock theater performing Wings of the Morning, the Maryland State play, which was written for him by incorporating an African-American character/narrator based loosely on de Sousa.

== See also ==
- African Americans in Maryland
- History of the Jews in Maryland
