= Lynching of Stephen Williams =

1894 lynching in Maryland

Stephen Williams was an African American man, lynched in Upper Marlboro, Maryland on October 20, 1894.

Williams had confessed to raping Mrs. Katie Hardesty, an offense described as "one of the most brutal in the criminal annals of Prince George's County" and was locked up in the Jail in Upper Marlboro.

Stephen Williams did his research while planning his attack on Mrs. Katie Hardesty on Wednesday, October 17, 1894. Williams made sure that her husband, Albert Hardesty, was down at the local store, he knew that Mrs. Hardesty was sick in bed, and he knew how to enter the house the way Mr. Hardesty would to buy himself more time for the act. What Stephen Williams did not plan for was the family dog intervening during the attack. On the night of his assail, Williams went down to the county store in Upper Marlboro, Prince George's County, Maryland, and confirmed that Mr. Hardesty was indeed conducting business. Afterwards, he approached the home and entered loudly just as Mr. Hardesty would. Stephen Williams was not recognized until Katie Hardesty raised herself from her bed and saw Williams. Before she could ask what Williams wanted, she was fighting for her life, as weak as she was, and was being dragged out of the house and through their lawn, getting caught up in a wire fence in the process. During the assault, the family dog lunged at Williams and proceeded to bite the foot of Williams, protecting his owner as best it could. It was during this distraction that Mrs. Hardesty's young daughter ran out of the house and down the street screaming for help. It was only until Williams heard the crying child that he stopped the assault, and fled. Mrs. Hardesty then, in her battered state and in nothing but her nightgown, ran to her husband and told him what just happened.

A group of masked men broke into the jail and pulled Williams from under his mattress, put a rope around his neck and dragged him from the jail. Williams was dragged to the "iron bridge just between the town and the railroad depot." The rope was thrown over the top beams of the bridge and Williams was "hauled up." A round of gunfire was unleashed into Williams' hanging body and the corpse was left dangling on the bridge.

This was the same bridge that Joe Vermillion was lynched on in 1889.
