= Lynching of Joseph Vermillion =

Murder case in the United States

Joseph Vermillion was a 27-year-old white man lynched on December 3, 1889, for the crime of arson in Upper Marlboro, Maryland.

Vermillion had been jailed in Upper Marlboro for a series of arsons involving barns filled with tobacco and houses in Prince George's County. At 2:30am, a band of masked men broke into the jail, overpowered the jailkeeper, and left with Vermillion.

Vermillion was dragged to the "iron bridge just between the town and the railroad depot" and hanged. His body was left hanging from the bridge until the coroner's investigation. That same bridge was used 5 years later in another lynching, of Stephen Williams, by a similar band of masked men.
