= Lynching of William Burns =

1907 murder in Cumberland, Maryland

William Burns was an African-American man who was lynched on October 6, 1907, in Cumberland, Maryland, for the alleged murder of white Cumberland police officer August Baker.

== Altercation ==
William Burns was from Fauquier County, Virginia, and was about 18 years old. He had lived in Cumberland for about six months, working as a porter that the Alpine Hotel, and as a driver for a saloon. On October 3, 1907, Burns visited several saloons near the Cumberland waterfront with another African-American man named Jesse Page. At Kate Preston's saloon, Burns was thrown out for disorderly conduct. Police officer August Baker arrived to arrest Burns,. There was a struggle, Baker hit Burns with a mace, and Burns shot Baker in the abdomen. Even so, Baker succeeded in handcuffing Burns and called for help, inducing two bystanders to take Burns to the police station. Burns was taken from there to the Cumberland Jail. Page was also arrested and placed in a cell next to Burns.

Several days later, Baker died in hospital. On the day of the shooting, Officer Robert O'Neill took Baker to Western Maryland Hospital for treatment. The challenge getting Baker up the steep steps to the hospital, and the apparent indifference of the hospital's staff caused caused O'Neill to take Baker to Allegany Hospital instead, delaying care. Although Burns was said to fear retaliation for Baker's death, Allegany County Sheriff Horace Hamilton did not add guards at the jail., leaving only deputy Noah Hendley. Page, who had also feared that he would be attacked, was cleared and released.

== Lynching ==
Around midnight on October 5, a mob of about 50 men with their coats turned inside out and handkerchiefs over their faces gathered outside the jail. The mob grew to several hundred. Refused entry to the jail by Hendley, the mob was said to have torn down a telegraph pole and used it to batter down the doors to the jail. One account reports that Burns was dragged out of his cell after Hendley handed over the keys to the cell at gunpoint, while others assert that they were able to gain forcible entrance, or that Hendley's wife convinced Hendley to turn over the keys. In the process of gaining entry, the mob broke gas pipes, almost asphyxiating the other 26 prisoners.

The mob, by now more than 2000 strong, took Burns outside, demanding a confession from Burns, and he was shot repeatedly at about 12:40 on October 6, "peppered with bullets" and left to die. The crowd wanted to hang Burns, but they could not find a rope. Benjamin A. Richmond, a white attorney and an associate of Governor Lloyd Lowndes Jr., attempted to find help from the police, but only found one officer. Entering the police station, they found five more officers inside, having locked themselves in. Reluctantly convinced to go to the jail, they arrived too late.

Pastor William Cleveland Hicks of Emmanuel Episcopal Church stepped in to stop the mutilation of Burns's body, which the mob was intent on burning. Hicks spoke out publicly against the lynching the same day. Richmond said:

“The conduct of the police of Cumberland was simply shameful and disgraceful. Although the disorder was going on for more than half an hour, not one of them appeared on the scene until after the negro was dead, and would not have come then but for my action.”

Burns's body was taken to a funeral parlor. 10,000 people, including children, filed through the funeral home to see Burns's body.

The Allegany County Commissioners offered a reward of $500 for the arrest and conviction of the people who took Burns from the jail. Richmond stated that a number of prominent men from Cumberland and vicinity were involved in the lynching. Deputy Hendley stated that he was unable to identify any of the mob that had stormed the jail. Chief Judge A. Hunter Boyd, who had been at the scene and had urged the crowd to disperse, claimed to have recognized spectators. He convened a grand jury, whose October 19 verdict identified no participants. The Baltimore Afro-American Ledger published an article on October 12 condemning the event and the absence of consequences for the perpetrators of the lynching.

== Identity of the victim ==
Burns's body was claimed by his sister Selina, who wanted to take his body back to Pittsburgh, where she resided. She was unable to afford this, and Burns's body was buried in at Sumner Cemetery in Cumberland on October 10.

In 2021 the Brownsville Project, a Western Maryland transformative justice organization, researched matters concerning the lynching as a project to document the event. The research indicates that "William Burns" was in fact a man from Delaplane, Virginia named Robert Hughes, aged 18. According to an account in the Washington Herald, there was unclaimed laundry waiting for Burns with the tag "James Hughes." Although the Brownsville Project could not locate a James Hughes, they were able to find Selina Hughes's relatives. All were accounted for in family records, except for Robert Wormley Hughes, who was the correct age, and whose death was unaccounted for.

== Legacy ==
The Allegany County Lynching Truth and Reconciliation Committee (ACLTRC) was formed to memorialize Hughes and to work to further document the African-American community in Allegany County. A historical marker commemorating the lynching was dedicated across from the courthouse in 2021.
