= Lynching of Michael Green =

1878 lynching in Maryland

- Location: Near Upper Marlboro, Maryland
- Date: September 1, 1878

Michael Green was an African American man who was lynched by a band of masked men near Upper Marlboro, Maryland on September 1, 1878.

Green was arrested for assaulting Miss Alice Sweeny on August 26, 1878, and held at the jail in Upper Marlboro. Threats of lynching were openly made and were held off by the vigilance of Sheriff James N.W. Wilson. After several days, a band of masked men removed Green from the jail, placed a noose around his neck and hanged him 15 feet in the air from a tree outside of town. His body remained dangling from the tree and was observed the next morning.
