= Hispanics and Latinos in Maryland =

Ethnic group in U.S. state

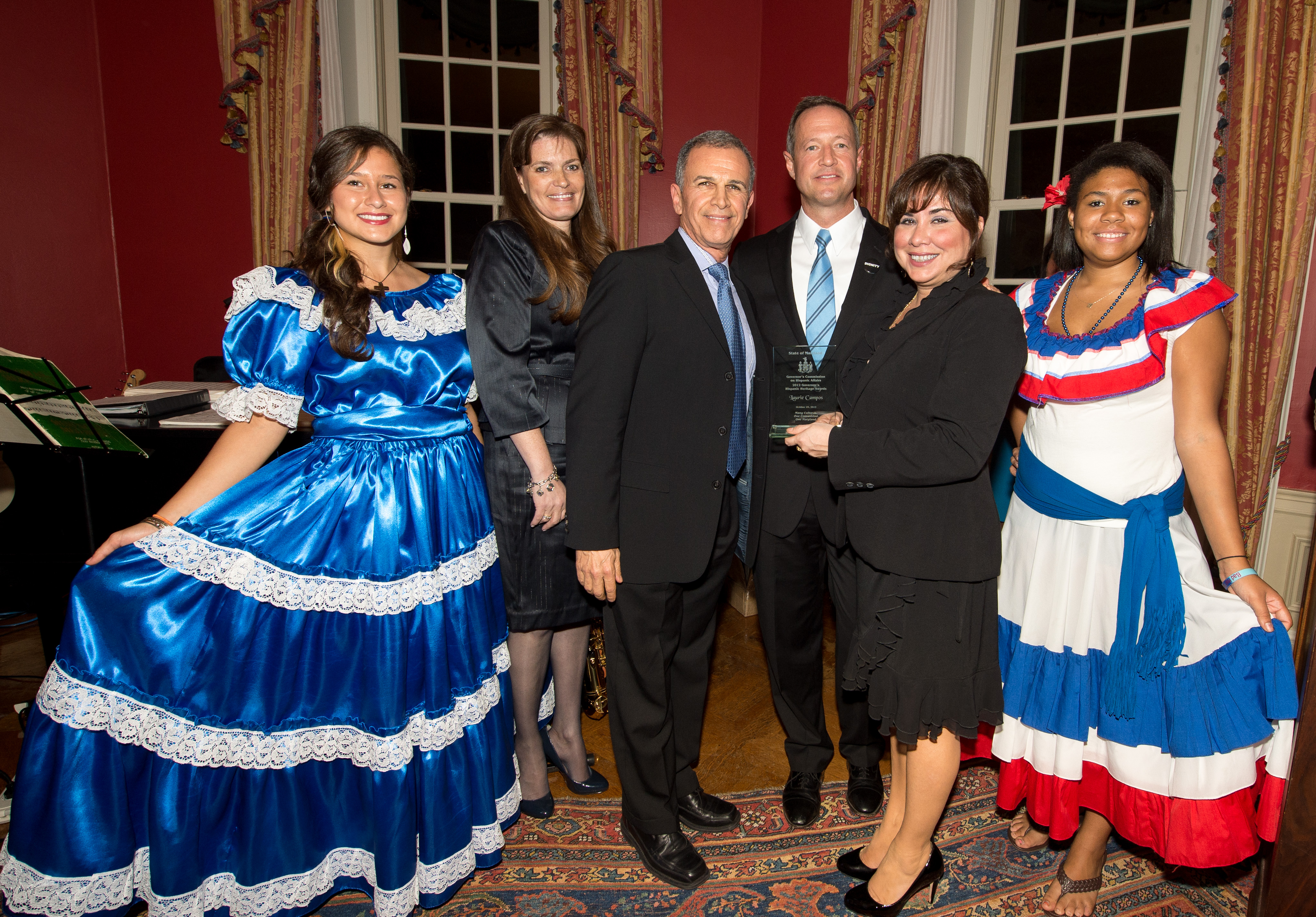
Maryland Gov. Martin O'Malley (center right) hosts a Hispanic Heritage Month event in Annapolis.

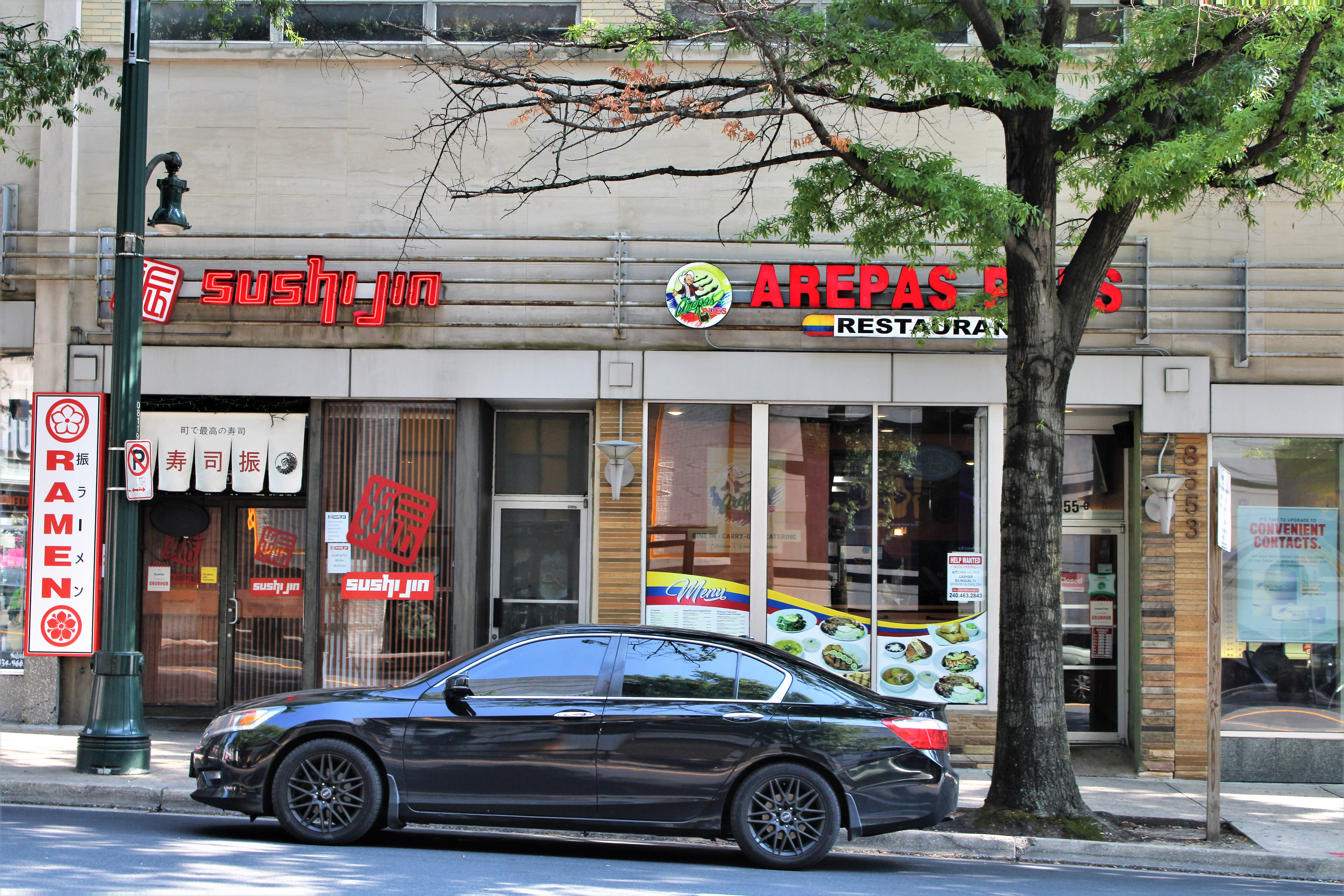
An arepa restaurant in downtown Silver Spring

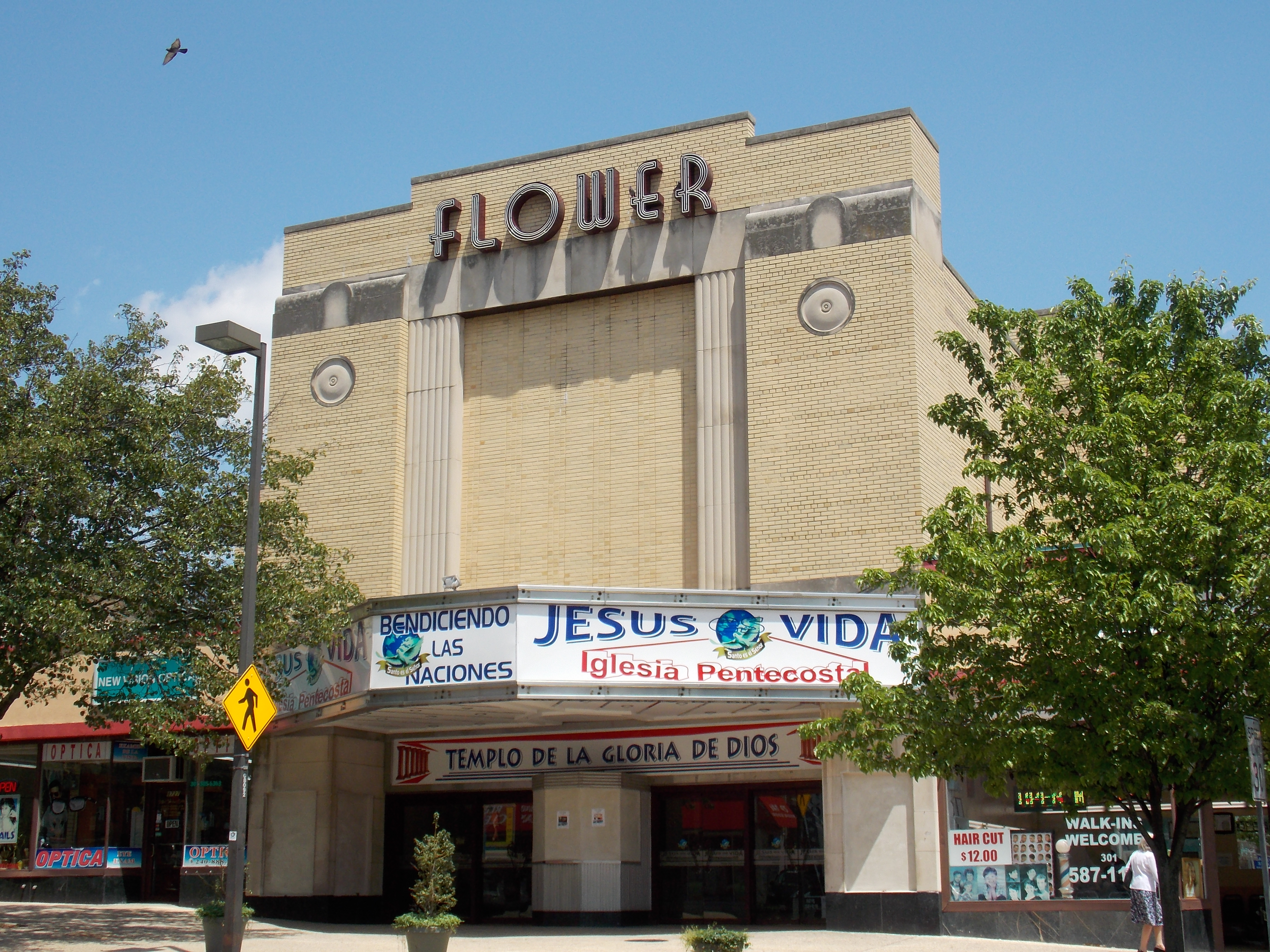
A Spanish-speaking Pentecostal church occupies the former Flower Theater in Takoma Park.

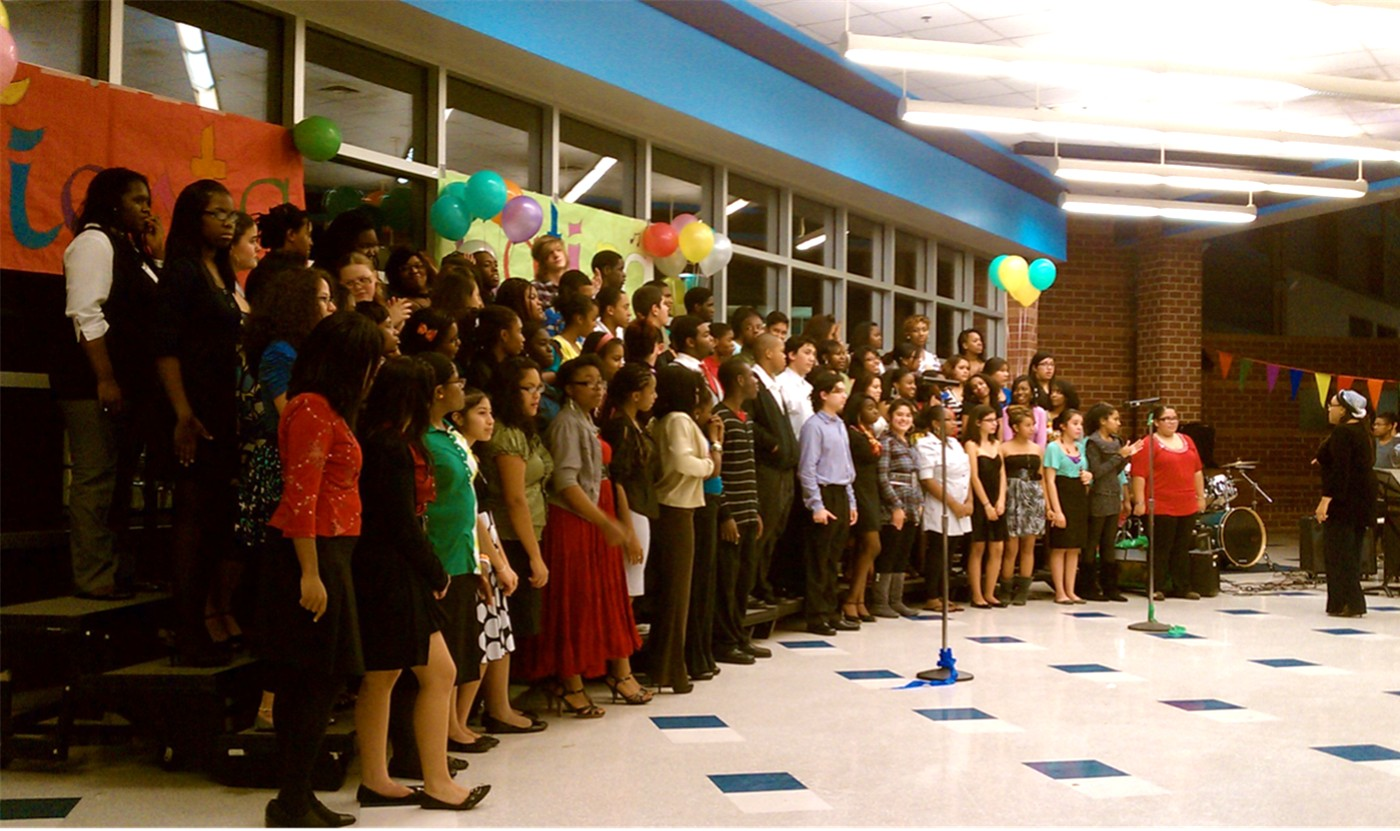
Hyattsville's Northwestern High School choir performs at Fiesta Latino.

Hispanic and Latino Marylanders are residents of the state of Maryland who are of Hispanic or Latino ancestry. As of the year 2019, Hispanics and Latinos of any race were 10.4% of the state's population. The largest concentration of Hispanics/Latinos is in the National Capital Area, where Hispanics and Latinos constitute 16.04% of the total population (17.02% of Montgomery County and 14.94% of Prince George's County). Some Maryland communities such as Langley Park, Riverdale Park, East Riverdale, Templeville, and Marydel have Hispanic and Latino-majority populations. Other communities such as Wheaton, Glenmont, and Aspen Hill have a Hispanic/Latino plurality population.

== History ==
In the early 18th century, a Sephardi Spanish and Portuguese Jewish community was established in Maryland. This small community of Sephardim was centered in Baltimore.

== Politics ==
As of 2016, 35.8% of Maryland's Hispanic and Latino population was eligible to vote. By contrast, 80% of non-Hispanic white Marylanders are eligible to vote. Maryland had 199,000 Hispanic/Latino eligible voters, ranking 20th in the United States by state. 5% of all eligible voters in Maryland are Hispanic/Latino.

== Hispanic or Latino by national origin ==
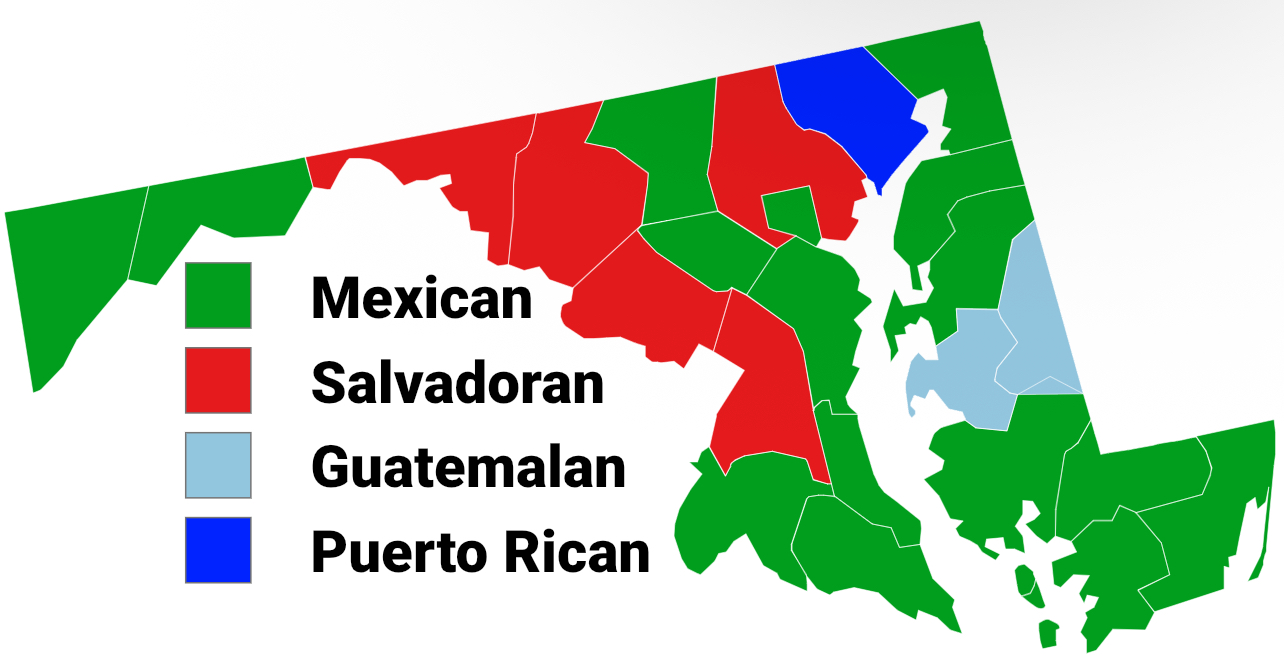
Largest Hispanic ancestry in Maryland by county, per the 2020 census

| Hispanic or Latino by Type | Number | |
|---|---|---|
| Total Population | 5,773,552 | 100.0% |
| Hispanic or Latino (of any race) | 336,390 | 8.7% |
| (Mexico) Mexican | 64,374 | 19.1% |
| (Puerto Rico) Puerto Rican | 36,592 | 10.9% |
| (Cuba) Cuban | 7,862 | 2.3% |
| (Dominican Republic) Dominican | 9,694 | 2.9% |
| Central American | 130,760 | 38.9% |
| (Costa Rica) Costa Rican | 1,665 | 0.5% |
| (Guatemala) Guatemalan | 23,096 | 6.9% |
| (Honduras) Honduran | 10,318 | 3.1% |
| (Nicaragua) Nicaraguan | 4,757 | 1.4% |
| (Panama) Panamanian | 3,790 | 1.1% |
| (El Salvador) Salvadoran | 81,877 | 24.3% |
| Other Central American | 5,257 | 1.6% |
| South American | 49,574 | 14.7% |
| (Argentina) Argentine | 5,354 | 1.6% |
| (Bolivia) Bolivian | 7,259 | 2.2% |
| (Chile) Chilean | 3,541 | 1.1% |
| (Colombia) Colombian | 9,247 | 2.7% |
| (Ecuador) Ecuadorian | 6,028 | 1.8% |
| (Paraguay) Paraguayan | 385 | 0.1% |
| (Peru) Peruvian | 11,965 | 3.6% |
| (Uruguay) Uruguayan | 1,231 | 0.4% |
| (Venezuela) Venezuelan | 2,620 | 0.8% |
| Other South American | 1,944 | 0.6% |
| Other Hispanic or Latino | 37,534 | 11.2% |

== See also ==
- Hispanics and Latinos in Washington, D.C.
