= Mennonites in Maryland =

Anabaptist Christian community

The Mennonites in Maryland maintain a small population dating back over a century. The majority of Maryland's Mennonites live in Southern Maryland or on the Eastern Shore, while smaller Mennonite communities exist in Grantsville, Baltimore, Howard County, and elsewhere scattered throughout the state.

== Mennonite communities ==
=== Central Maryland ===
==== Baltimore ====
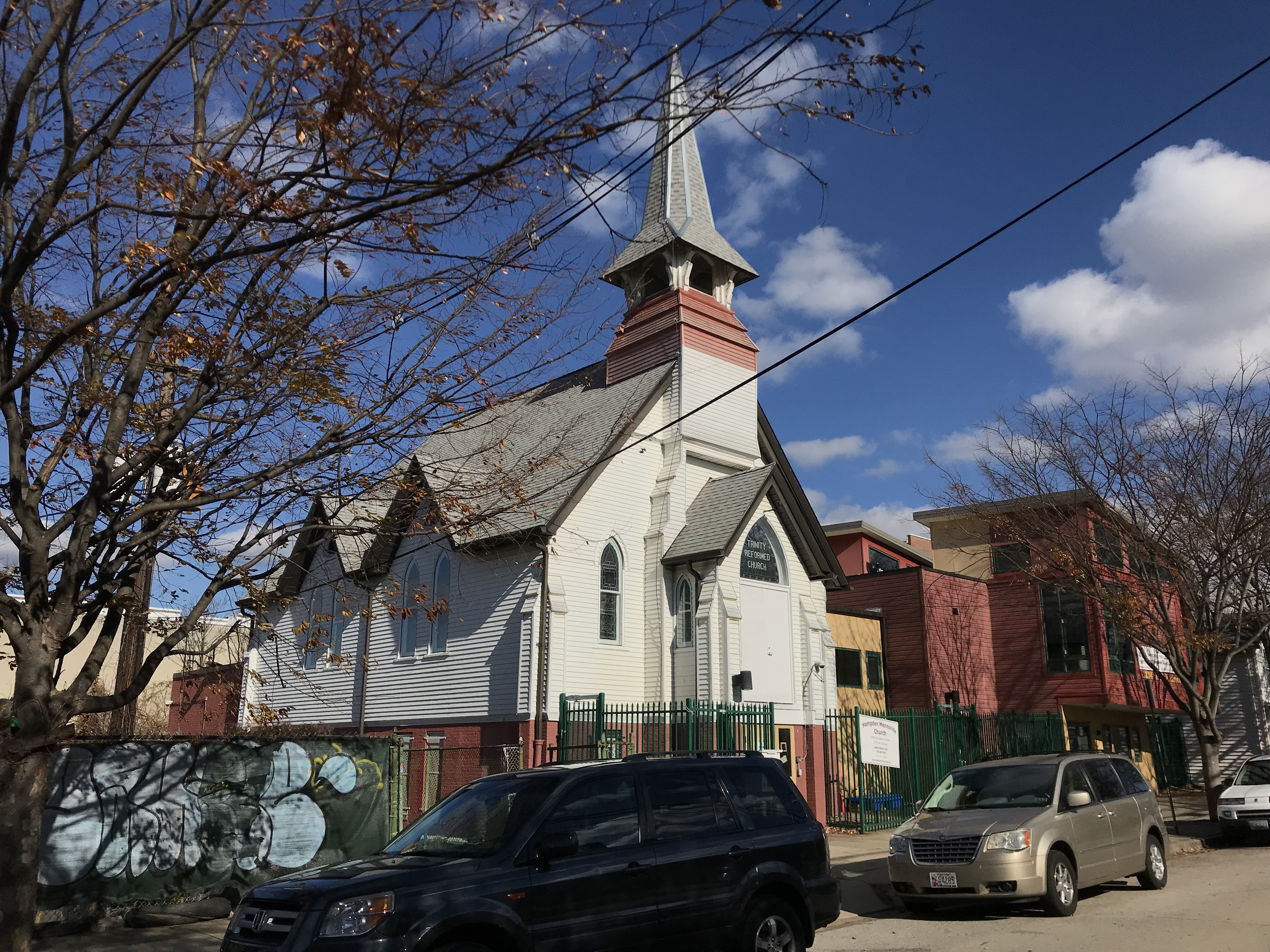
Hampden Mennonite Church in Baltimore, November 2017.

While Mennonites in Maryland have traditionally lived in rural areas, an increasing number are relocating to urban areas such as Baltimore. Three Mennonite congregations existed in Baltimore in 2015, including Wilkens Avenue Mennonite Church in Southwest Baltimore, North Baltimore Mennonite Church in Roland Park, and Hampden Mennonite Church in Hampden. Hampden Mennonite Church also maintains the Hampden Christian School; both the church and school are located at 1234 West 36th Street in the building formerly occupied by Trinity Reformed Church.

Old Order Mennonites from rural Pennsylvania and African-American horsemen in West Baltimore have come together to preserve the city's arabber tradition. Arabbers are a merchant tradition handed down over generations of African-American families. Baltimore's arabbers maintain three horse stables, while Mennonites from Pennsylvania Dutch Country provide assistance. The leader of Baltimore's Arabber Preservation Society, Daniel Van Allen, has described the relationship as "the meeting of two subcultures...They're not involved with the same big-budget, big-money economy that the modern people are." The arabbers' horses are taken to New Holland, Pennsylvania to be shod.

==== Ellicott City ====
New Life Mennonite Church (formerly Maple Grove Mennonite and First Mennonite Church of Columbia) in Ellicott City maintains a community garden called "Seeds of Life".

=== Southern Maryland Dutch Country ===
There is an Old Order Mennonite community in Loveville. The Mennonites of Loveville maintain a farmers' market/produce auction, as well as craft shops and an annual quilt auction. In nearby the nearby communities of Mechanicsville and Charlotte Hall, there is also an Amish community. The Old Order Mennonites share certain similarities with the Amish, such as use of the horse and buggy. In recent years, increasing development has threatened the Amish and Mennonite communities of Southern Maryland.

In the late 1990s, over 100 Mennonite families lived in Southern Maryland.

=== Western Maryland ===
The town of Grantsville is home to a small Mennonite and Amish settlement known as Tomlinson's or Little Crossing, located along Braddock Road.

By 1888, four Mennonite congregations existed in Washington County; Reiff Mennonite Church, Stouffer Mennonite Church, Clear Spring Mennonite Church, and Miller Mennonite Church.

Alta Schrock, a Mennonite community activist and biology professor who was the first American Mennonite woman to earn a Ph.D., founded the Spruce Forest Artisan Village in Garrett County, Maryland.

=== List of Mennonite churches in Maryland ===
- Bittinger Mennonite Church - Bittinger
- Capital Christian Fellowship - Lanham
- Casselman Mennonite Church - Grantsville
- Clear Spring Mennonite Church - Clear Spring
- Flintstone Mennonite Church - Flintstone
- Gaithersburg Mennonite Church - Gaithersburg
- Glade Mennonite Church - Accident
- Gortner Union Church - Oakland
- Goshen Mennonite Church - Laytonsville
- Hampden Mennonite Church - Baltimore
- Harmony Christian Fellowship - Millington
- Holly Grove Mennonite Church - Westover
- Hyattsville Mennonite Church - Hyattsville
- Lanes Run Mennonite Church - Indian Springs
- Meadow Mountain Mennonite Church - Swanton
- Meadow View Mennonite Church - Hagerstown
- Miller Mennonite Church - Leitersburg
- Mount Olive Mennonite Church - Hagerstown
- New Life Mennonite Church - Ellicott City
- Oldtown Mennonite Church - Oldtown
- Paradise Mennonite Church - Hagerstown
- Pinesburg Mennonite Church - Williamsport
- Pinto Mennonite Church - Pinto
- Pondsville Mennonite Church - Smithsburg
- Red Run Mennonite Church - Grantsville
- Reiff Mennonite Church - Washington County
- Snow Hill Mennonite Church - Snow Hill
- Stouffer Mennonite Church - Washington County
- Swanton Mennonite Fellowship - Swanton
- Wilkens Avenue Mennonite Church - Baltimore
- Yarrowsburg Mennonite Church - Knoxville
- Zimmerman Mennonite Church (defunct) - Carroll County

=== Notable Mennonites from Maryland ===
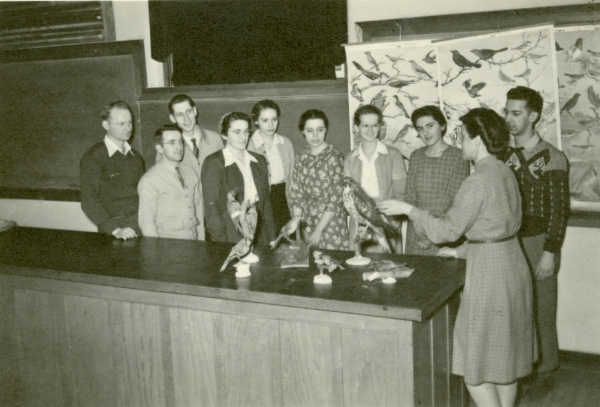
Schrock leading the Audubon Club at Goshen College

- JC Chasez, a singer, songwriter, dancer, record producer, and actor best known for NSYNC.
- Alta Schrock, a biology professor and community activist in Western Maryland who was the first Mennonite woman in the United States to earn a Ph.D.
- J. Lowell Stoltzfus, a Republican Senator, and former Minority Leader, representing Maryland's 38th Legislative District.

== See also ==
- Amish in Maryland

== Biography ==
- Burdge, Edsel; Horst, Samuel L. Building on the Gospel Foundation: The Mennonites of Franklin County, Pennsylvania and Washington County, Maryland, 1730-1970 (Studies in Anabaptist and Mennonite History), Scottdale PA, Herald Press, 2004.
- Kepple, Bernice. Amish Mennonite Children's Home, Grantsville, Maryland, 1914-1938, [Oakland, Md.] : [B. Kepple], [2010].
- Lehman, Daniel R. Mennonites of the Washington County, Maryland and Franklin County, Pennsylvania Conference, Lititz, Pa. : Publication Board of the Eastern Pennsylvania Mennonite Church and related areas, 1990.
- Showalter, Roy M. Fragmentary glimpses of the history of the Mennonites of the Beaver Creek district, Washington County, Maryland, app. 1743 to app. 1845, and "Zions Meeting House," built 1792-1793, [Chambersburg, Pa.] : Washington-Franklin Mennonite Historical Committee, 1960.
