= Amish in Maryland =

Populations of Amish people in Maryland

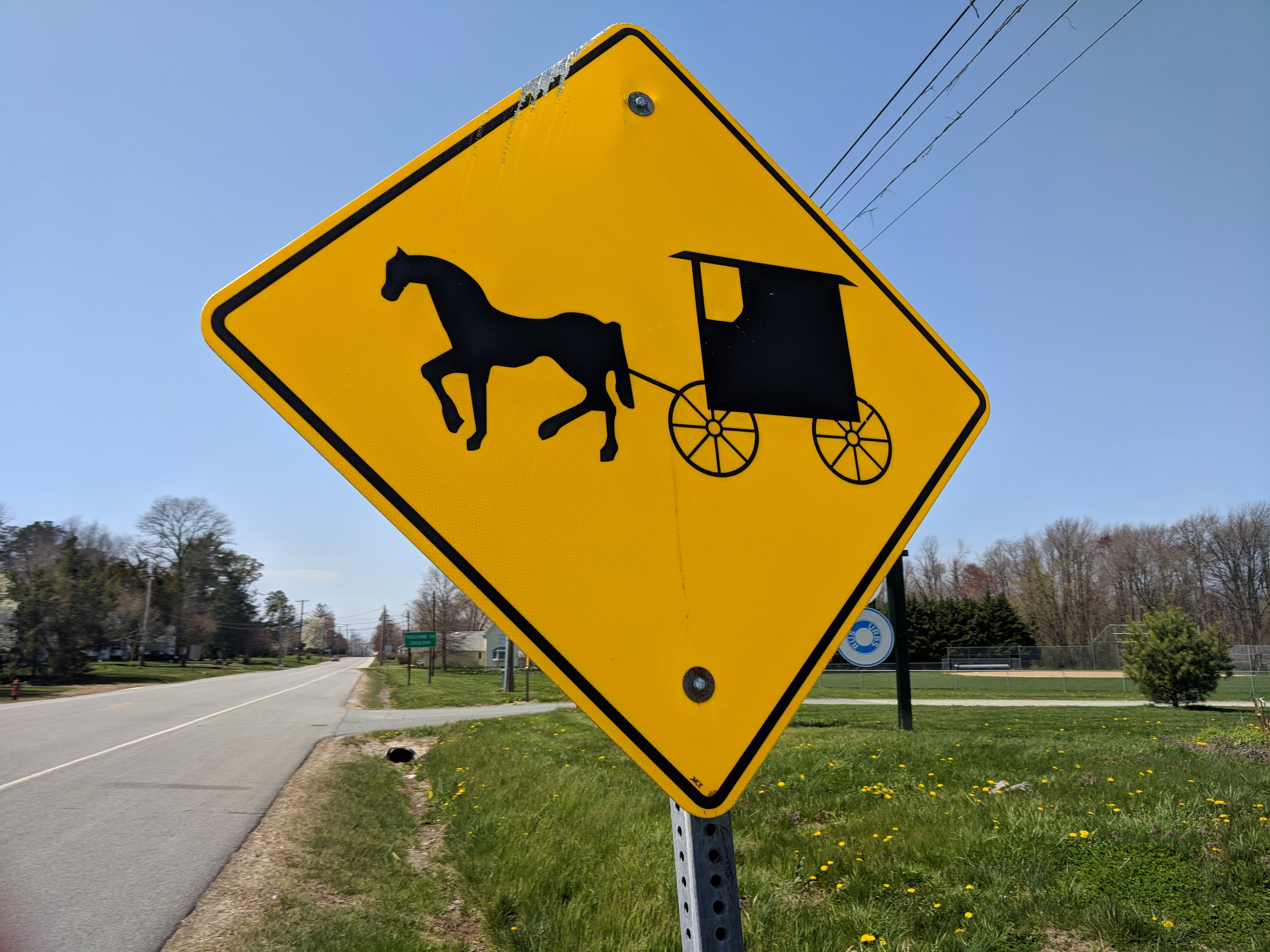
Amish horse and buggy warning signs in Cecilton, April 2018.

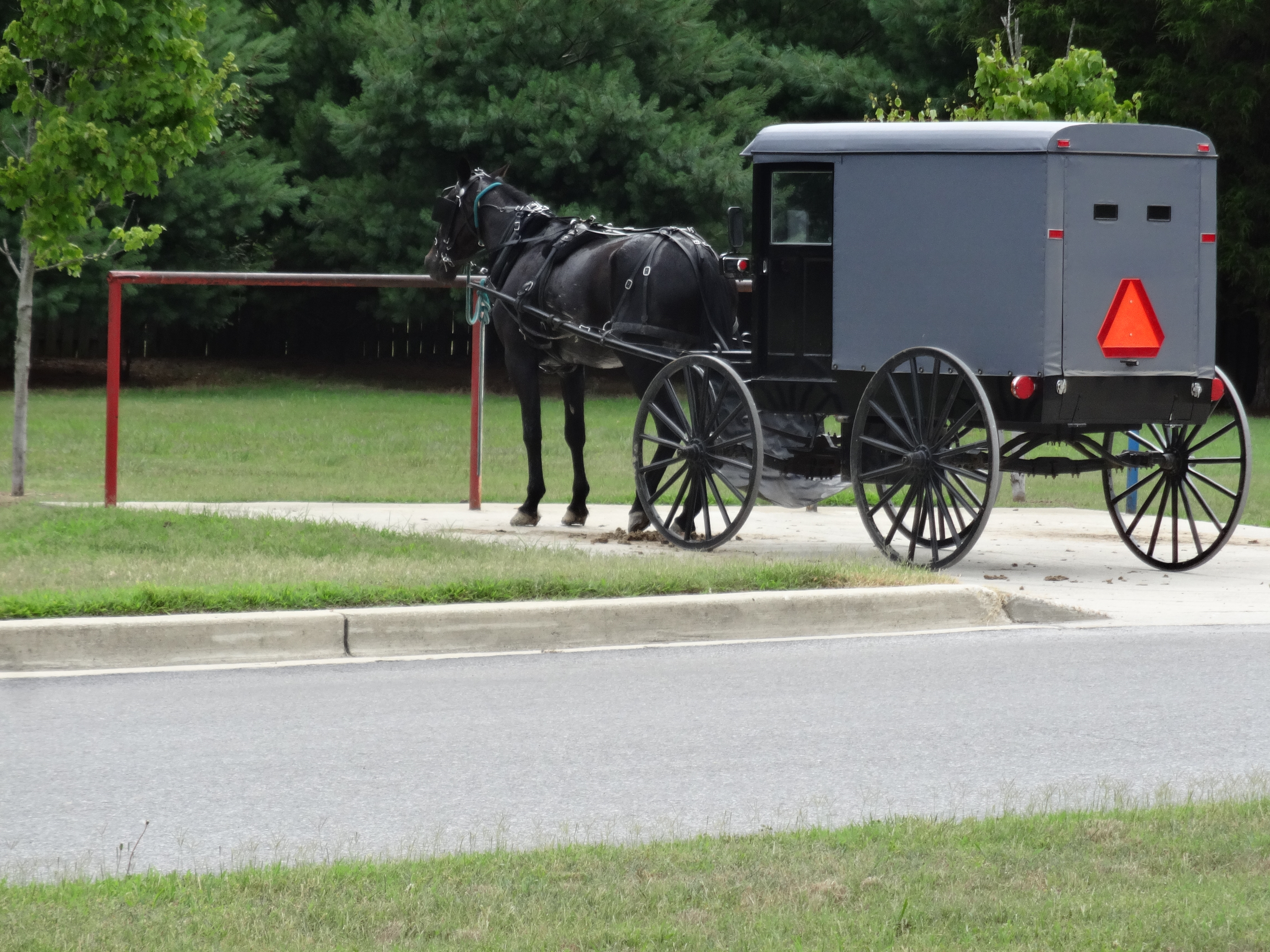
Horse and buggy parking lot for the Amish at County First Bank, Mechanicsville, July 2015.

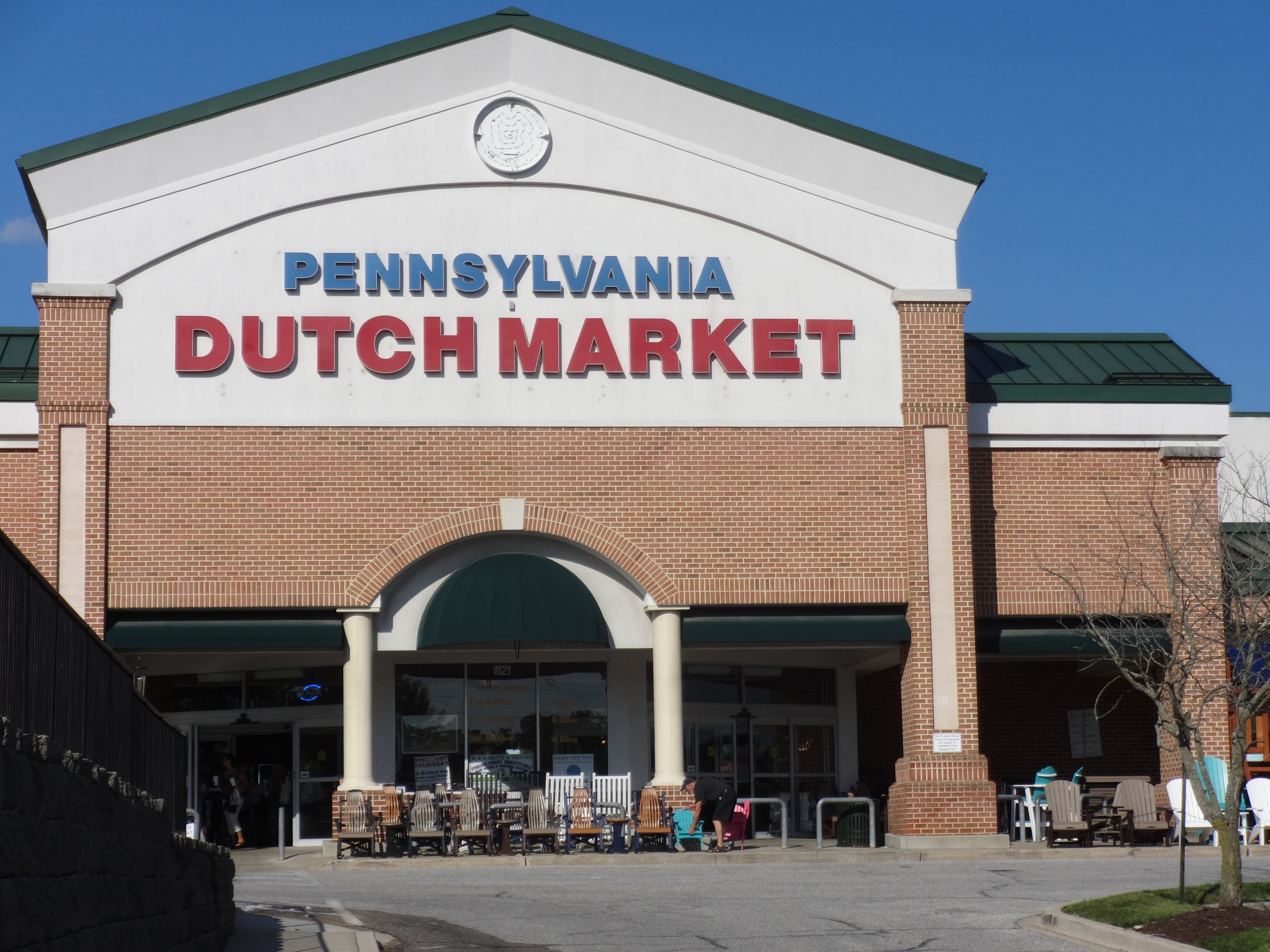
Pennsylvania Dutch Market in Cockeysville, July 2015.

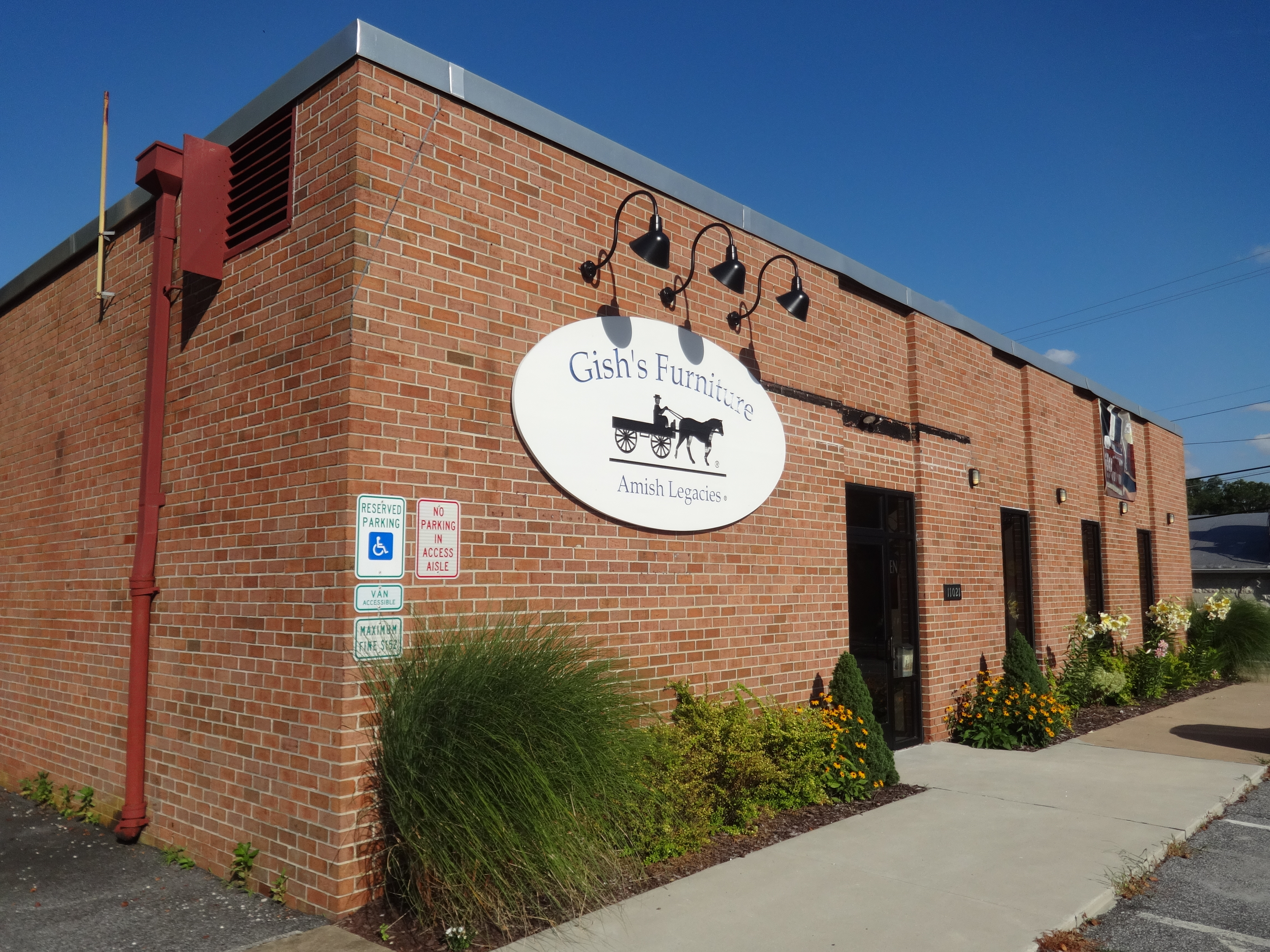
Gish's Furniture Amish Legacies, a store in Cockeysville that sells Amish-made furniture, July 2015.

The Amish in Maryland maintain a small but well-established population. There have been four Amish communities in the history of Maryland, three of which currently exist. The three Amish communities of Maryland are located in Western Maryland, Southern Maryland, and on the Eastern Shore. Historically, an Amish community also existed in rural Baltimore County, but had disappeared by the 1950s. The Amish communities of Maryland are all inhabited by the descendants of Amish migrants from Pennsylvania. In 2018, Maryland had an Amish population of around 1,575 people.

== Amish communities ==
=== Eastern Shore ===
The town of Cecilton on Maryland's Eastern Shore is home to a small Amish community that was founded in 1999. Amish families moved to the area from Lancaster County, Pennsylvania because of increasing costs and the declining amount of farmland there.

=== Southern Maryland Dutch Country ===
The communities of Mechanicsville and Charlotte Hall in Southern Maryland are home to the largest Amish population in Maryland. The community is well known for its agriculture and its large farmers' market/flea market. The Amish community in the Mechanicsville/Charlotte Hall area consists of 8 church districts and about 1,000 people. The Amish first came to the area in 1939-1940 after some members left the Amish community in Lancaster County, Pennsylvania over a conflict with schooling. The Amish in St. Mary's County maintain dairy and produce farms along with small Amish businesses. There is also an Old Order Mennonite community in the Mechanicsville area. In recent years, increasing development has threatened the Amish community.

=== Western Maryland ===
The town of Oakland in Western Maryland is home to an Amish community that consists of a church district of about 70 homes. The Amish community dates back to 1850 and is Maryland's oldest Amish community. The community has become associated with the New Order Amish, with electricity permitted inside of homes. The Amish community in Oakland has a small number of converts to the Amish faith, known as "Seekers", a rarity in the Amish world. There are only between 150 and 200 Amish converts in the United States out of a population around 200,000. The Lancaster County, Pennsylvania Amish have not had a successful convert in over 100 years.

=== Historic community in Long Green ===
The unincorporated community of Long Green in Baltimore County was once home to a small Amish community. The Amish community in Long Green was founded in 1833 and lasted for 120 years, before disappearing in the 1950s. The community was founded by Amish from Lancaster County, Pennsylvania, but few settlers moved to the area because Maryland was a slave state at the time. Few Amish people crossed the Mason–Dixon line, due to the Amish opposition to slavery. An Amish meetinghouse was constructed in 1899, but the community never grew large. The community dwindled in size over time, with the last Amish person dying in 1953.

== Population ==
=== Counties by percentage ===
Data from 2010 according to "Association of Religion Data Archives" (ARDA) and from 2020 according to the "US Religion Census" report. Data are only shown for Old Order Amish and exclude related groups such as Beachy Amish-Mennonite Churches, Maranatha Amish-Mennonite, Amish-Mennonites and Mennonites in general.

| County | Adherents (2010) | Adherents (2020) | Change 2010-20 | % 2010 | % 2020 |
|---|---|---|---|---|---|
| Garrett | 261 | 322 | ▲23.4% | 0.86% | 1.12% |
| St. Mary's | 610 | 549 | ▼10.0% | 0.58% | 0.48% |
| Charles | 489 | 769 | ▲57.2% | 0.33% | 0.46% |
| Cecil | 152 | 208 | ▲36.8% | 0.15% | 0.20% |

== See also ==
- Mennonites in Maryland
