= List of lynchings in Texas in 1922 =

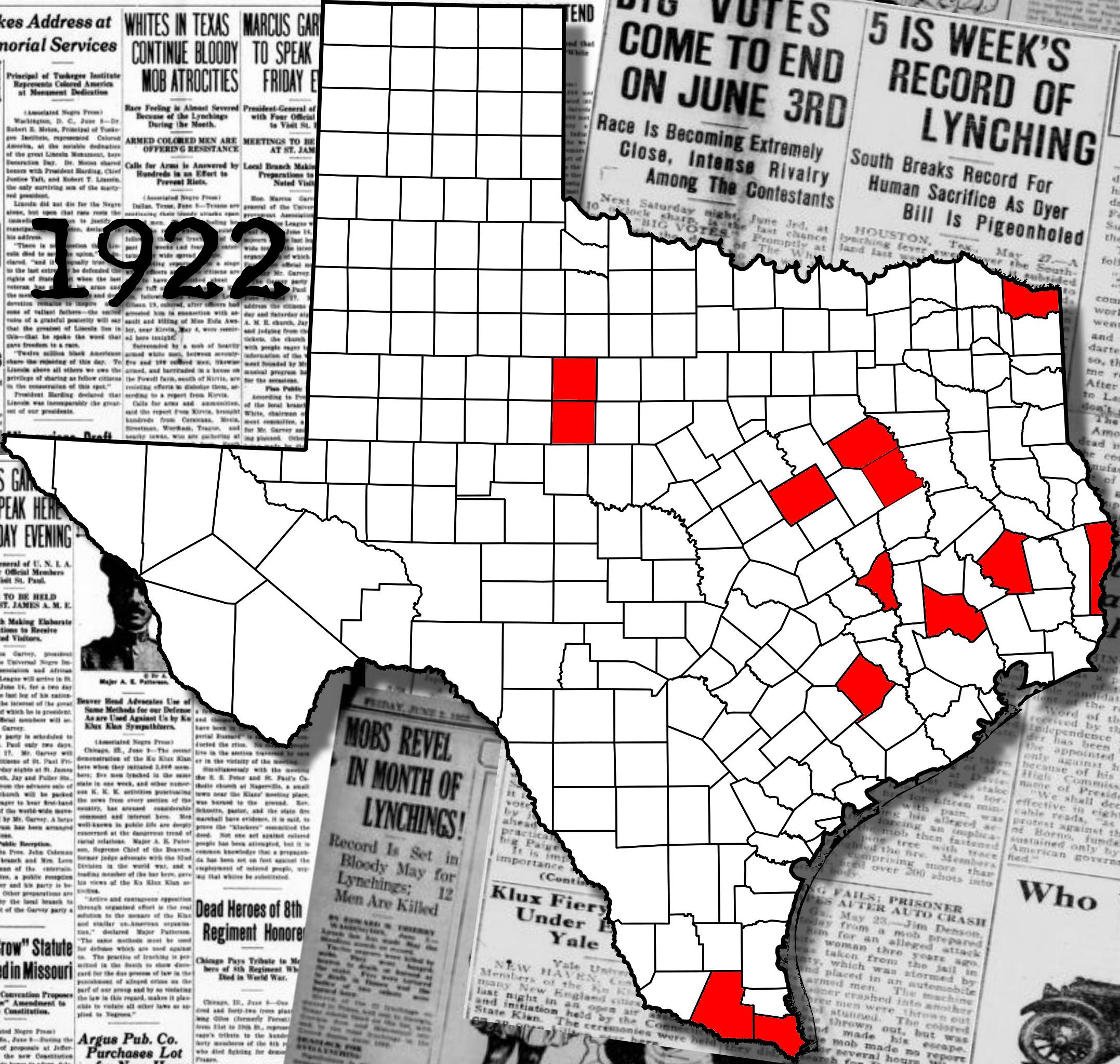
The county location of lynchings in 1922 on a Map of Texas

In 1922 there were 13 lynchings in the American state of Texas. Of these 13 attacks, there were 15 people killed. Montgomery County, Texas had the most lynching with three, Thomas Early (May 17, 1922); Joe Winters (May 20, 1922); Warren Lewis (June 23, 1922).

Texarkana is a city that is bisected down the middle by the state borders of Texas and Arkansas. The west of the city is in Bowie County, Texas and the east is in Miller County, Arkansas. There was a lynching on the Arkansas side of Texarkana, when P. Norman was killed on February 11, 1922. The people involved most likely involved in the lynch mob came from the Texas side.

In 1922 United States there were 61 lynchings of which Texas had the most followed by Georgia (11) and Mississippi (8). In 1921 there were 64 people lynched in the United States with the top three states being Georgia (14), Mississippi (13), and Texas & Arkansas both having six lynching incidents.

The lynchings in 1922 Texas ranged from single incidents to the deaths of multiple people at the hands of the mob, like the Lynching in Kirvin, Texas where four people were killed. Some lynch mobs burnt their victims alive, others riddled their bodies with bullets or strung them up and hanged them from trees or lamposts.

African Americans weren't the only minority group in American impacted by lynchings. Texas was a very hostile place towards Mexicans after World War I. According to Lawrence A. Cardoso, right after World War I ended one Mexican national was lynched per week in the state of Texas.

== Lynching in 1922 Texas ==
This table is from a report by the United States Senate Committee on the Judiciary.

No.	Name	Age	Race	Date	Place	Method of lynching	Alleged Crime
1	Manuel Duarte		Hispanic	February 2, 1922	Cameron County, Texas	Shot	Refusing to leave the farm
2	Snap Curry	23	African-American	May 6, 1922	Kirvin, Freestone County, Texas	Burned	Assault and murder of white woman
3	H. Varney (or Johnnie Cornish)	19	African-American	May 6, 1922	Kirvin, Freestone County, Texas	Burned	Assault and murder of white woman
4	Mose Jones	46	African-American	May 6, 1922	Kirvin, Freestone County, Texas	Burned	Assault and murder of white woman
5	Tom Cornish		African-American	May 8, 1922	Kirvin, Freestone County, Texas	Burned	Assault and murder of white woman
6	Thomas Early	25~	African-American	May 17, 1922	Conroe, Montgomery County, Texas	Burned	Assault of a white woman
7	Hullen Owens		African-American	May 19, 1922	Texarkana, Bowie County, Texas	Hanged (body burned)	Murder
8	Joe Winters	20	African-American	May 20, 1922	Conroe, Montgomery County, Texas	Burned	Assault of a white woman
9	Mose Bozier	60	African-American	May 20, 1922	Alleyton, Colorado County, Texas	Hanged	Assault of a white woman
10	Gilbert Wilson		African-American	May 23, 1922	Bryan, Brazos County, Texas	Beaten to death	Stealing cattle
11	Jesse Thomas	23	African-American	May 26, 1922	Waco, McLennan County, Texas	Shot (body burned)	Murder, assault
12	Warren Lewis	17	African-American	June 23, 1922	New Dacus, Montgomery County, Texas	Hanged	Assault of a white woman (Note: Forced to give speech to other Blacks, telling them to stay in their place and be good workers)
13	O.J. Johnson		African-American	September 7, 1922	Newton, Newton County, Texas	Hanged (Note: Hung from tree and body riddled with bullets)	Murder (Note: Johnson was twice tried with killing a Turpentine camp foreman four years ago.)
14	Grover C. Everett		African-American	September 9, 1922	Abilene, Taylor and Jones Counties	Shot	Unknown (Note: Four masked men walked into his hotel room, shot him and left)
15	Elias Villarael Zarate	22	Hispanic	November 11, 1922	Weslaco, Hidalgo County, Texas	Shot	Assault on white co-worker
16	George Gay	25	African-American	December 11, 1922	Streetman in Freestone and Navarro	Hanged	Assault of a white woman

== See also ==
- List of lynching victims in the United States

== Bibliography ==
Notes

References

- "Aged Texas Negro is lynched by mob". Arizona Republican. Phoenix, Maricopa, Arizona: Republican Pub. Co. May 21, 1922. pp. 1–34. ISSN 2157-135X. OCLC 2612512.
- "Masked Men Kill Negro At Abilene". Austin American-Statesmen. September 11, 1922. ISSN 1553-8451. OCLC 45162983.
- "Negro, 60, Lynched". Bisbee Daily Review. Bisbee, Cochise, Arizona: W.B. Kelly. May 21, 1922. pp. 1–12. ISSN 2157-3255. OCLC 11363144.
- Cardoso, Lawrence A. (1980). Mexican Emigration to the United States, 1897–1931 - Chapter (pp. 96-118) 6 Mexican Policies and Attitudes in the 1920s: New Urgency. University of Arizona Press. JSTOR j.ctvss3xzr.10. - Total pages: 23
- "Mob Lynches Texas Negro". Casper Daily Tribune. Casper, Natrona, Wyoming: J.E. Hanway. September 7, 1922. pp. 1–10. OCLC 14909902.
- "Another Lynching". The Chicago Whip. Chicago, Cook County, Illinois: Whip Pub. Co. September 16, 1922. ISSN 2694-099X. OCLC 15192974.
- "Asks for match is given rope and death instead". The Chicago Whip. Chicago, Cook County, Illinois: Whip Pub. Co. July 1, 1922. pp. 1–16. ISSN 2694-099X. OCLC 15192974.
- "Slaying of Negro is "deplorable tragedy"". The Daily Ardmoreite. Ardmore, Carter, Oklahoma: John F. Easley. September 22, 1922. pp. 1–10. ISSN 1065-7894. OCLC 12101538.
- "3 Black Burned by mob in Texas". The Morning Tulsa Daily World. Tulsa, Oklahoma: World Pub. Co. May 7, 1922. pp. 1–74. ISSN 2163-4637. OCLC 12228935.
- "La Justicia obra activamente para fijar la responsabilidad de la muerte de Manuel Duarte". La Prensa. San Antonio, Bexar, Texas. March 2, 1922. pp. 1–8. ISSN 2577-3321. OCLC 9505681.
- "Mobs revel in months of lynchings". The Seattle Star. Seattle, King, Washington: E.H. Wells & Co. June 2, 1922. pp. 1–20. ISSN 2159-5577. OCLC 17285351.
- "Charge of Mexican to Twenty Texans". The Topeka State Journal. Topeka, Shawnee, Kansas. February 28, 1922. pp. 1–10. ISSN 2377-7117. OCLC 9124974.
- "Advises, on scaffold". The Topeka State Journal. Topeka, Shawnee, Kansas. June 24, 1922. pp. 1–16. ISSN 2377-7117. OCLC 9124974.
- United States Senate Committee on the Judiciary (1926). "To Prevent and Punish the Crime of Lynching: Hearings Before the United States Senate Committee on the Judiciary, Subcommittee on S. 121, Sixty-Ninth Congress, First Session, on Feb. 16, 1926". United States Government Publishing Office.
- "Bloody May marks fight over Anti-lynching Bill". The West Virginian. Fairmont, Marion, West Virginia: Fairmont Printing and Publishing Company. June 2, 1922. pp. 1–16. ISSN 2576-6228. OCLC 14450054.

Number	Name	Date	Place	Method of lynching	Number of victims
1	Bill McAllister	January 8, 1922	Williamsburg, S.C.	Shot	1
2	Lincoln Hickson	January 8, 1922	Williamsburg, S.C.	Shot	1
3	Willie Jenkins	January 10, 1922	Eufaula, Alabama	Shot	1
4	Jake Brooks	January 14, 1922	Oklahoma City, Oklahoma	Hanged	1
5	Charles Strong	January 17, 1922	Mayo, Florida	Hanged	1
6	Will Bell	January 29, 1922	Pontotoc, Mississippi	Shot	1
7	Unidentified	January 29, 1922	Pontotoc, Mississippi	Shot	
8	Drew Conner (White)	January 28, 1922	Bolinger, Alabama	Burned	1
9	Will Thrasher	February 1, 1922	Crystal Springs, Mississippi	Hanged	1
10	Harry Harrison	February 2, 1922	Malvern, Arkansas	Shot	1
11	Manuel Duarte	February 2, 1922	Cameron County, Texas	Shot	1
12	P. Norman	February 11, 1922	Texarkana, Arkansas	Shot	1
13	Will Jones	February 13, 1922	Ellaville, Georgia	Shot	1
14	William Baker	March 8, 1922	Aberdeen, Mississippi	Hanged	1
15	Alfred Williams	March 12, 1922	Harlem, Georgia	Hanged	1
16	Brown Culpepper (White)	March 13, 1922	Holly Grove, Louisiana	Shot	1
17	Jerry Ingram	March 17, 1922	Crawford, Mississippi	Shot	1
18	Unidentified (white)	March 19, 1922	Okay, Oklahoma	Drowned	1
19	Alexander Smith	March 22, 1922	Gulfport, Mississippi	Hanged	1
20	Snap Curry	May 6, 1922	Kirvin, Texas	Burned	1
21	H. Varney (or Johnnie Cornish)	May 6, 1922	Kirvin, Texas	Burned	1
22	Mose Jones	May 6, 1922	Kirvin, Texas	Burned	1
23	Tom Cornish	May 8, 1922	Kirvin, Texas	Hanged	1
24	Thomas Early	May 17, 1922	Conroe, Texas	Burned	1
25	Charles Atkins	May 18, 1922	Davisboro, Georgia	Burned	1
26	Hullen Owens	May 19, 1922	Texarkana, Texas	Hanged (body burned)	1
27	Joe Winters	May 20, 1922	Conroe, Texas	Burned	1
28	Mose Bozier	May 20, 1922	Alleyton, Texas	Hanged	1
29	Gilbert Wilson	May 23, 1922	Bryan, Texas	Beaten to death	1
30	Jesse Thomas	May 26, 1922	Waco, Texas	Shot (body burned)	1
31	William Byrd	May 28, 1922	Brentwood, Georgia	Shot (body burned)	1
32	Robert Collins	June 20, 1922	Summit, Mississippi	Hanged	1
33	Warren Lewis	June 23, 1922	New Dacus, Texas	Hanged	1
34	James Harvey	July 1, 1922	Lanes Bridge, Georgia	Hanged	1
35	Joe Jordan	July 1, 1922	Lanes Bridge, Georgia	Hanged	1
36	Philip Tankard	July 5, 1922	Belhaven, North Carolina	Shot	1
37	Joe Pemberton	July 7, 1922	Benton, Louisiana	Hanged	1
38	Jake "Shake" Davis	July 14, 1922	Miller County, Georgia	Hanged	1
39	Oscar Mack	July 18, 1922	Orange County, Florida	Hanged (False report, Oscar Mack survived)	1
40	Will Anderson	July 24, 1922	Allentown, Georgia	Shot	1
41	John West	July 28, 1922	Guernsey, Arkansas	Shot	1
42	Gilbert Harris	August 1, 1922	Hot Springs, Arkansas	Hanged	1
43	John Glover	August 1, 1922	Holton,	Shot	1
44	Bayner Blackwell	August 6, 1922	Swansboro, North Carolina	Shot	1
45	John Steelman	August 23, 1922	Lambert, Mississippi	Burned	1
46	Thomas Rivers	August 30, 1922	Bossier Parish, Louisiana	Hanged	1
47	F. Watt Daniels (White)	August 1922	Mer Rouge, Louisiana	Ku-Klux Klan	1
48	Thomas F. Richards (White)	August 1922	Mer Rouge, Louisiana	Ku-Klux Klan	1
49	Jim Reed Long	September 2, 1922	Winder, Georgia	Ku-Klux Klan	1
50	O.J. Johnson	September 7, 1922	Newton, Texas	Hanged	1
51	Jim Johnston	September 28, 1922	Sandersville, Georgia	Hanged	1
52	Grover C. Everett	September 28, 1922	Abilene, Texas	Shot	1
53	John Brown	October 3, 1922	Montgomery, Alabama	Shot	1
54	Ed Hartley (white)	October 20, 1922	Camden, Tennessee	Shot	1
55	George Hartley (white)	October 20, 1922	Camden, Tennessee	Shot	1
56	Elias V. Zarate	November 11, 1922	Weslaco, Texas	Shot	1
57	Cupid Dickson / Cubrit Dixon	December 5, 1922	Madison, Florida	Shot	1
58	Charles Wright	December 8 ,1922	Perry, Florida	Burned	1
59	Less Smith	December 9, 1922	Morrilton, Arkansas	Burned	1
60	George Gay	December 11, 1922	Streetman, Texas	Hanged	1
61	Arthur Young	December 11, 1922	Perry, Florida	Hanged	1
