= Lynching of George Gay =

1922 lynching death in Texas, United States

- Part of Jim Crow Era
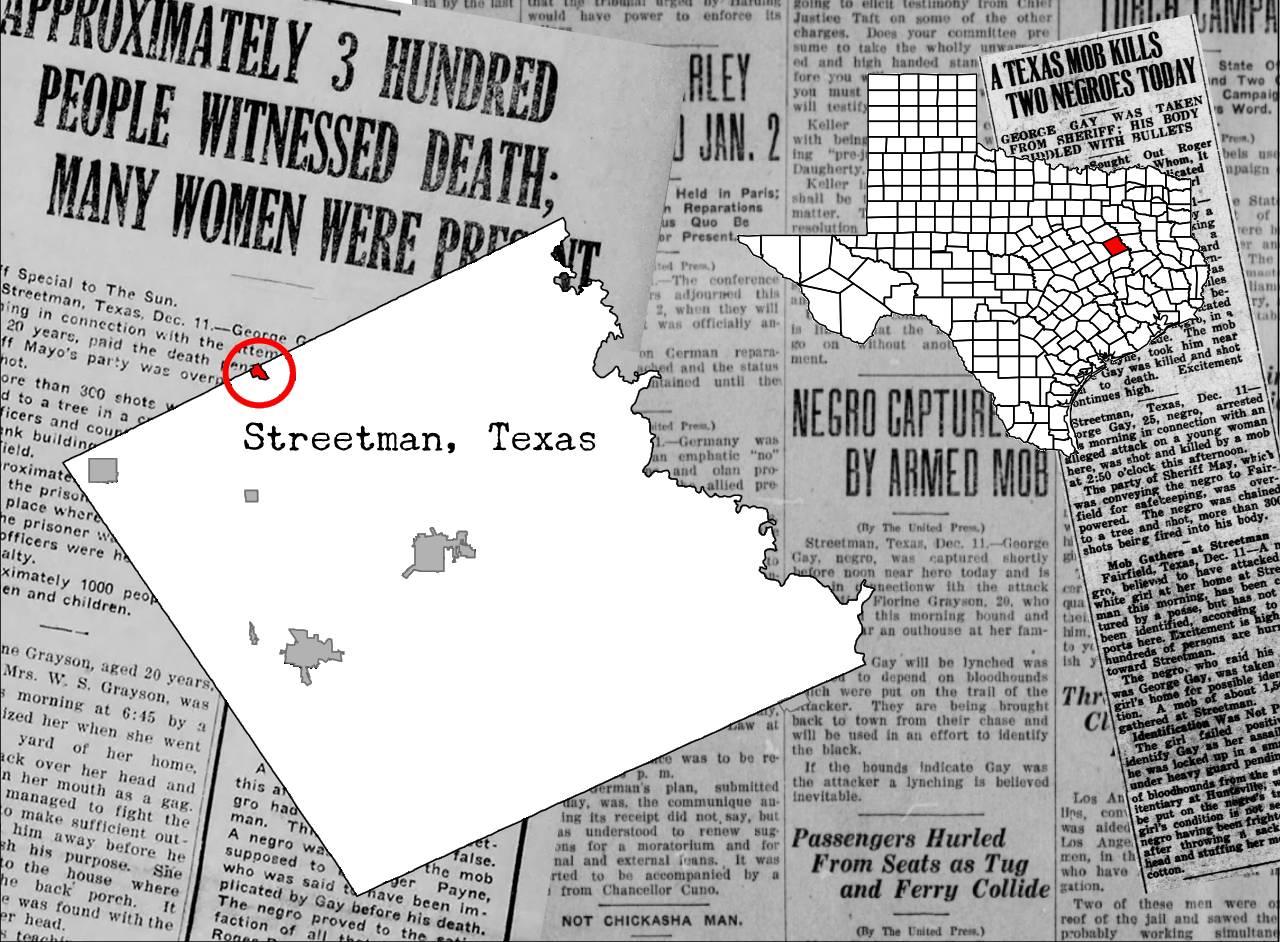
- News coverage of the Lynching of George Gay in Streetman, Texas in 1922
- Date: December 11, 1922
- Location: Streetman a town that straddles the border of Freestone and Navarro counties in Texas
- Participants: A white mob of Kirvin, Texas 2,000 strong
- Deaths: George Gay

On December 11, 1922, George Gay was lynched in Streetman, a town that straddles the border of Freestone and Navarro counties in Texas. He allegedly assaulted a young girl. According to the United States Senate Committee on the Judiciary, it was the 60th of 61 lynchings during 1922 in the United States.

== Background ==
Tensions in the region were very high as a number of Black men had been lynched in the area. On May 6, 1922, 8 miles (13 km) away from Streetman, three Black men were lynched in Kirvin, Texas, for allegedly murdering 17-year-old Eula Ausley. In Waco, Texas, 60 miles (97 km) away from Streetman, Jesse Thomas was lynched on May 26, 1922. All were killed with little to no evidence.

In Streetman, the daughter of Mrs. W.S. Grayson, 20-year-old Miss Florine Grayson, was a teacher at Birdston school. On Monday, December 11, 1922, someone attacked her at 6:45 AM when they threw a sack over her head and stuffed her mouth with a cloth (some reports say mouth stuffed with cotton). She was able to free herself and yell loudly enough to quickly beckon for help.

George Gay was a 25-year-old Black man that lived 200 yards (180 m) from the Grayson house. At 10:45 AM, he was seized upon and seemed to have another piece of cloth that matched the cloth used as a gag in the attack. He was brought before Florine Grayson, but she couldn't positively identify him as the attacker. Bloodhounds were asked to be brought in from Huntsville in order to find the attacker.

== Lynching ==
Word had spread throughout the region, and a crowd some 2,000 strong had gathered demanding justice. Sensing that the situation was getting out of his control, Sheriff Horace Mayo of Freestone County tried to move George Gay to a safer location. Before Gay could be moved, an estimated 250 vehicles blocked the sheriff, and the mob seized George Gay. At 2:50 PM, George Gay was chained to a tree and shot over 300 times.

== Aftermath ==
A second man, Roger Payne, was implicated in the attack. A separate Black man was almost lynched when he was mistaken by the mob as he was Sentenced to 3 months in prison

== National memorial ==
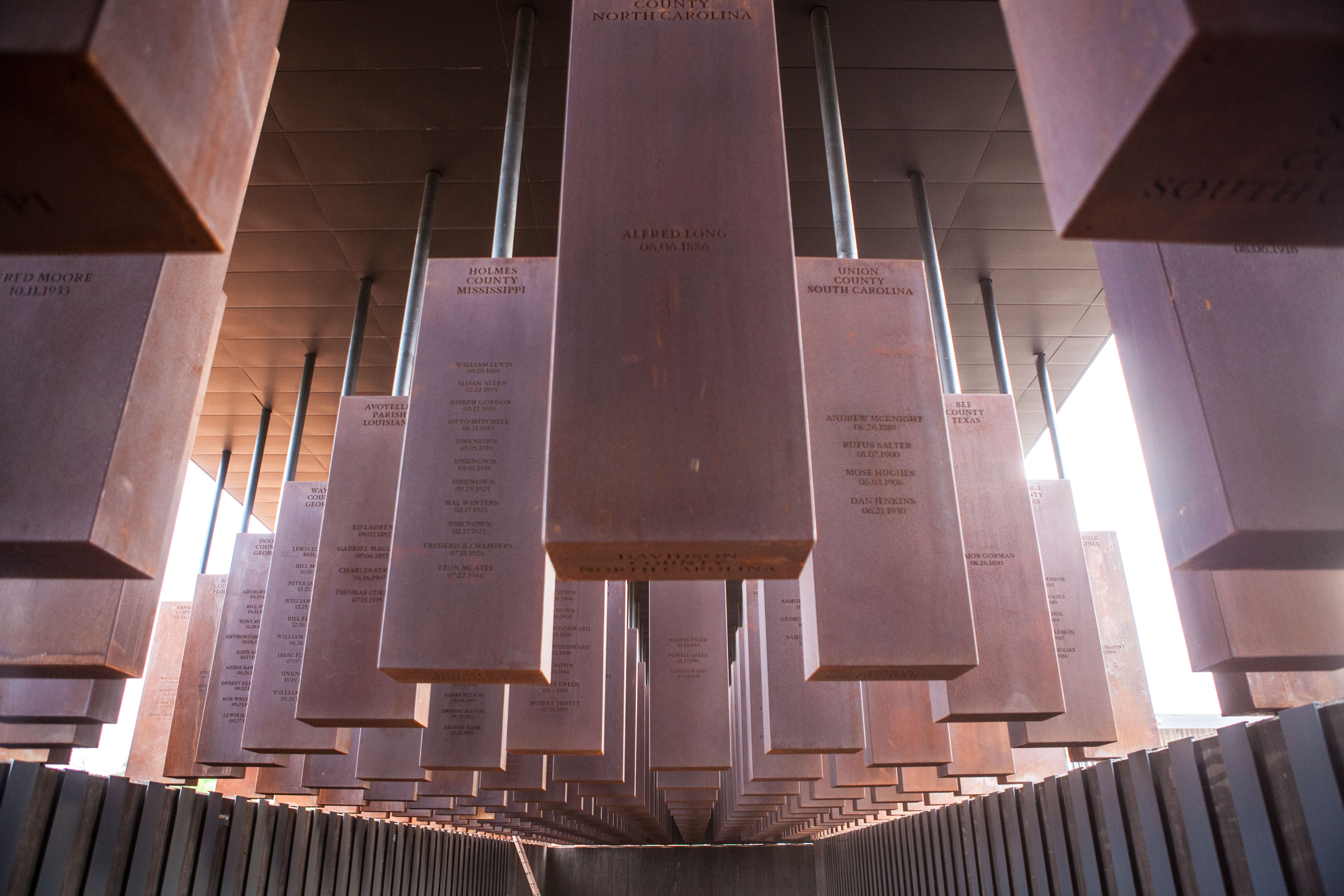
Memorial Corridor, National Memorial for Peace and Justice

The National Memorial for Peace and Justice, in Montgomery, Alabama, displays 805 hanging steel rectangles, each representing the counties in the United States where a documented lynching took place and, for each county, the names of those lynched. The memorial organizers hope that communities, like Freestone or Navarro where George Gay was lynched, will take their slab and install it in their own community.

== Bibliography ==
Notes

References

- Caldwell, Clifford R.; DeLord, Ron (2016). Eternity at the End of a Rope: Executions, Lynchings and Vigilante Justice in Texas, 1819-1923. Sunstone Press. ISBN 9781632930880. - Total pages: 668
- "Negro captured by armed mob". The Chickasha Daily Express. Chickasha, Grady, Oklahoma: A.M. Dawson. December 11, 1922. pp. 1–8. ISSN 2470-6752. OCLC 15045329.
- "A Texas Mob Kills Two Negros Today". The Coffeyville Daily Journal. Coffeyville, Kansas. December 11, 1922. OCLC 12257894.
- "Approximately 300 People Witnessed Death; Many Women Were Present". Corsicana Daily Sun. Corsicana, Texas. December 11, 1922. ISSN 8750-2518. OCLC 11173414.
- Robertson, Campbell (April 25, 2018). "A Lynching Memorial Is Opening. The Country Has Never Seen Anything Like It". The New York Times.
- United States Senate Committee on the Judiciary (1926). "To Prevent and Punish the Crime of Lynching: Hearings Before the United States Senate Committee on the Judiciary, Subcommittee on S. 121, Sixty-Ninth Congress, First Session, on Feb. 16, 1926". United States Government Publishing Office.

Number	Name	Date	Place	Method of lynching	Number of victims
1	Bill McAllister	January 8, 1922	Williamsburg, S.C.	Shot	1
2	Lincoln Hickson	January 8, 1922	Williamsburg, S.C.	Shot	1
3	Willie Jenkins	January 10, 1922	Eufaula, Alabama	Shot	1
4	Jake Brooks	January 14, 1922	Oklahoma City, Oklahoma	Hanged	1
5	Charles Strong	January 17, 1922	Mayo, Florida	Hanged	1
6	Will Bell	January 29, 1922	Pontotoc, Mississippi	Shot	1
7	Unidentified	January 29, 1922	Pontotoc, Mississippi	Shot	
8	Drew Conner (White)	January 28, 1922	Bolinger, Alabama	Burned	1
9	Will Thrasher	February 1, 1922	Crystal Springs, Mississippi	Hanged	1
10	Harry Harrison	February 2, 1922	Malvern, Arkansas	Shot	1
11	Manuel Duarte	February 2, 1922	Cameron County, Texas	Shot	1
12	P. Norman	February 11, 1922	Texarkana, Arkansas	Shot	1
13	Will Jones	February 13, 1922	Ellaville, Georgia	Shot	1
14	William Baker	March 8, 1922	Aberdeen, Mississippi	Hanged	1
15	Alfred Williams	March 12, 1922	Harlem, Georgia	Hanged	1
16	Brown Culpepper (White)	March 13, 1922	Holly Grove, Louisiana	Shot	1
17	Jerry Ingram	March 17, 1922	Crawford, Mississippi	Shot	1
18	Unidentified (white)	March 19, 1922	Okay, Oklahoma	Drowned	1
19	Alexander Smith	March 22, 1922	Gulfport, Mississippi	Hanged	1
20	Snap Curry	May 6, 1922	Kirvin, Texas	Burned	1
21	H. Varney (or Johnnie Cornish)	May 6, 1922	Kirvin, Texas	Burned	1
22	Mose Jones	May 6, 1922	Kirvin, Texas	Burned	1
23	Tom Cornish	May 8, 1922	Kirvin, Texas	Hanged	1
24	Thomas Early	May 17, 1922	Conroe, Texas	Burned	1
25	Charles Atkins	May 18, 1922	Davisboro, Georgia	Burned	1
26	Hullen Owens	May 19, 1922	Texarkana, Texas	Hanged (body burned)	1
27	Joe Winters	May 20, 1922	Conroe, Texas	Burned	1
28	Mose Bozier	May 20, 1922	Alleyton, Texas	Hanged	1
29	Gilbert Wilson	May 23, 1922	Bryan, Texas	Beaten to death	1
30	Jesse Thomas	May 26, 1922	Waco, Texas	Shot (body burned)	1
31	William Byrd	May 28, 1922	Brentwood, Georgia	Shot (body burned)	1
32	Robert Collins	June 20, 1922	Summit, Mississippi	Hanged	1
33	Warren Lewis	June 23, 1922	New Dacus, Texas	Hanged	1
34	James Harvey	July 1, 1922	Lanes Bridge, Georgia	Hanged	1
35	Joe Jordan	July 1, 1922	Lanes Bridge, Georgia	Hanged	1
36	Philip Tankard	July 5, 1922	Belhaven, North Carolina	Shot	1
37	Joe Pemberton	July 7, 1922	Benton, Louisiana	Hanged	1
38	Jake "Shake" Davis	July 14, 1922	Miller County, Georgia	Hanged	1
39	Oscar Mack	July 18, 1922	Orange County, Florida	Hanged (False report, Oscar Mack survived)	1
40	Will Anderson	July 24, 1922	Allentown, Georgia	Shot	1
41	John West	July 28, 1922	Guernsey, Arkansas	Shot	1
42	Gilbert Harris	August 1, 1922	Hot Springs, Arkansas	Hanged	1
43	John Glover	August 1, 1922	Holton,	Shot	1
44	Bayner Blackwell	August 6, 1922	Swansboro, North Carolina	Shot	1
45	John Steelman	August 23, 1922	Lambert, Mississippi	Burned	1
46	Thomas Rivers	August 30, 1922	Bossier Parish, Louisiana	Hanged	1
47	F. Watt Daniels (White)	August 1922	Mer Rouge, Louisiana	Ku-Klux Klan	1
48	Thomas F. Richards (White)	August 1922	Mer Rouge, Louisiana	Ku-Klux Klan	1
49	Jim Reed Long	September 2, 1922	Winder, Georgia	Ku-Klux Klan	1
50	O.J. Johnson	September 7, 1922	Newton, Texas	Hanged	1
51	Jim Johnston	September 28, 1922	Sandersville, Georgia	Hanged	1
52	Grover C. Everett	September 28, 1922	Abilene, Texas	Shot	1
53	John Brown	October 3, 1922	Montgomery, Alabama	Shot	1
54	Ed Hartley (white)	October 20, 1922	Camden, Tennessee	Shot	1
55	George Hartley (white)	October 20, 1922	Camden, Tennessee	Shot	1
56	Elias V. Zarate	November 11, 1922	Weslaco, Texas	Shot	1
57	Cupid Dickson / Cubrit Dixon	December 5, 1922	Madison, Florida	Shot	1
58	Charles Wright	December 8 ,1922	Perry, Florida	Burned	1
59	Less Smith	December 9, 1922	Morrilton, Arkansas	Burned	1
60	George Gay	December 11, 1922	Streetman, Texas	Hanged	1
61	Arthur Young	December 11, 1922	Perry, Florida	Hanged	1
