= Lynching of Mr. Norman =

Lynching in Texarkana, Arkansas
- Part of Jim Crow Era
- Date: February 11, 1922
- Location: Texarkana, Miller County, Arkansas
- Participants: Four masked men claiming they were not the KKK
- Deaths: Mr. Norman

Mr. Norman (referred to as P. Norman and N. Norman) was an African-American man who was lynched in Texarkana, Miller County, Arkansas by masked men on February 11, 1922. According to the 1926 report of the United States Senate Committee on the Judiciary, this was the 12th of 61 lynchings during 1922 in the United States.

== Background ==
Texarkana is a city that straddles the state border of Texas and Arkansas. The west of the city is in Bowie County, Texas and the east is in Miller County, Arkansas. It was developed at a 19th-century junction of two major railroads.

In February 1922, Deputy Sheriff J.R. Jordan of Texarkana was allegedly held at gunpoint by Norman and forced to drive several miles. At some point later, Norman was arrested and held at Ashdown, Arkansas.

== Lynching ==
Deputy Sheriff Will T. Jordan had driven to Ashdown, Arkansas to pick up Mr. Norman from their jail. On February 11, 1922, while returning to Texarkana, his car was stopped by masked men, near Spring Lake Park. They seized Norman from the car and took him away. The next day Norman's body was found with four gunshot wounds, left on a country road.

In addition to the lynching, a newspaper reported that "five white men were flogged, one white man seized and warned, and one negro notified in a note signed KKK to leave the city as a big clean-up was in progress.”

== Aftermath ==
After the lynching, deputy sheriff Will T. Jordan and J.R. Johnson was indicted for murder of Norman by the Bowie County grand jury. Both were released on bond. Jordan was released on a $3,000 ($46,500 in 2022) bond. The charges against them were dropped in 1923.

On February 21, 1922, at 10:00 PM in the Four States Pressroom, four masked men burst in armed with guns. They handed a note to the men working there, Charles Nutter, Robert Lusk and the news editor. It read, "We are the four men who took the negro away from Mr. Jordan. We are citizens of Texarkana and intend to stay here. Find us. We are not K.K.K."

== National memorial ==
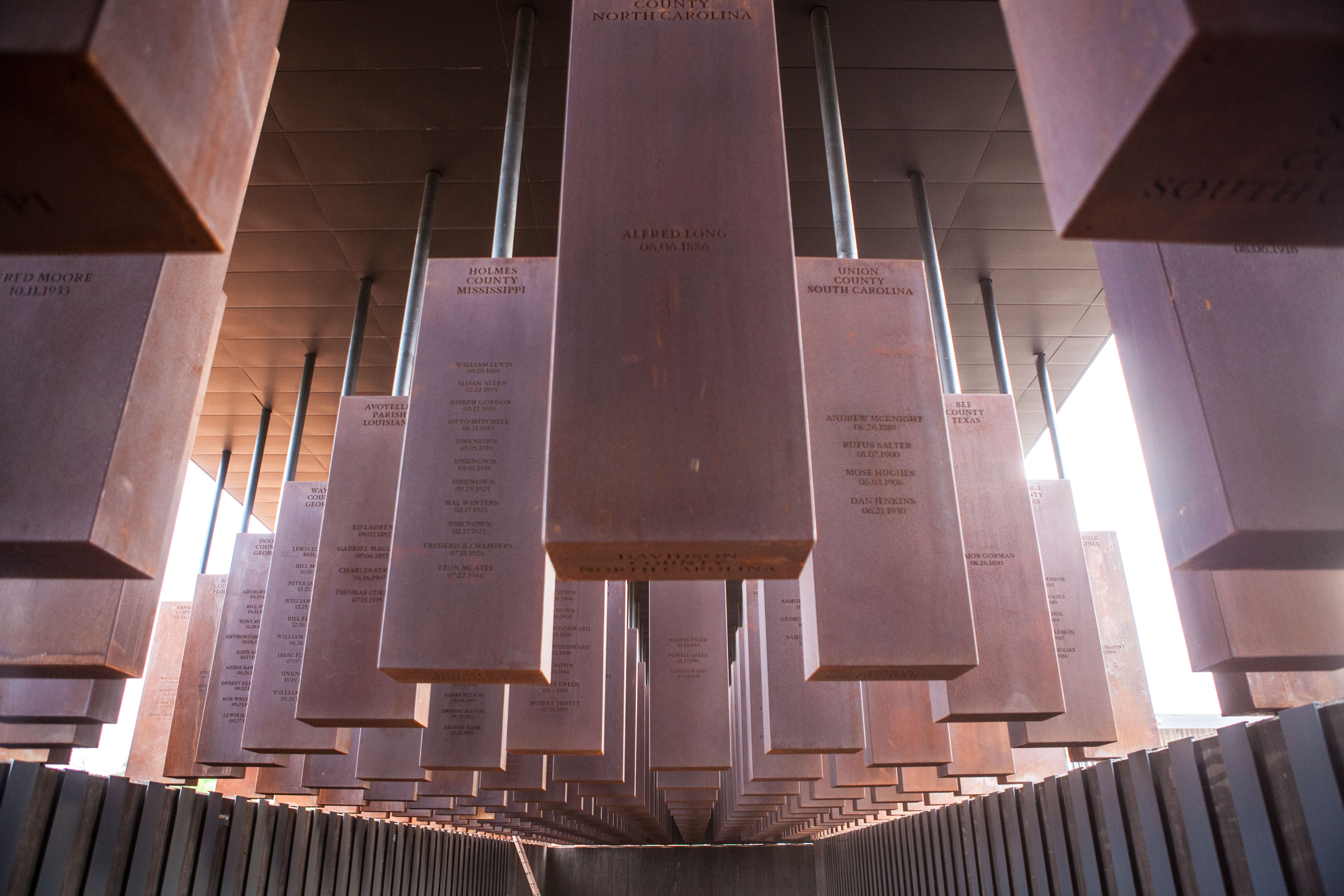
Memorial Corridor, National Memorial for Peace and Justice

The National Memorial for Peace and Justice opened in Montgomery, Alabama, on April 26, 2018. It is devoted to the history of lynchings in the United States and memorializing the victims. The Memorial Corridor features 805 hanging steel rectangles, each representing a county where a documented lynching has taken place. Each rectangle is incised with the names of lynching victims in that county. The memorial hopes that communities, like Miller County, Arkansas where Mr. Norman was lynched, will take these slabs and install them in their own communities.

== See also ==
- Lynching of Hullen Owens - Texarkana, Texas

Number	Name	Date	Place	Method of lynching	Number of victims
1	Bill McAllister	January 8, 1922	Williamsburg, S.C.	Shot	1
2	Lincoln Hickson	January 8, 1922	Williamsburg, S.C.	Shot	1
3	Willie Jenkins	January 10, 1922	Eufaula, Alabama	Shot	1
4	Jake Brooks	January 14, 1922	Oklahoma City, Oklahoma	Hanged	1
5	Charles Strong	January 17, 1922	Mayo, Florida	Hanged	1
6	Will Bell	January 29, 1922	Pontotoc, Mississippi	Shot	1
7	Unidentified	January 29, 1922	Pontotoc, Mississippi	Shot	
8	Drew Conner (White)	January 28, 1922	Bolinger, Alabama	Burned	1
9	Will Thrasher	February 1, 1922	Crystal Springs, Mississippi	Hanged	1
10	Harry Harrison	February 2, 1922	Malvern, Arkansas	Shot	1
11	Manuel Duarte	February 2, 1922	Cameron County, Texas	Shot	1
12	P. Norman	February 11, 1922	Texarkana, Arkansas	Shot	1
13	Will Jones	February 13, 1922	Ellaville, Georgia	Shot	1
14	William Baker	March 8, 1922	Aberdeen, Mississippi	Hanged	1
15	Alfred Williams	March 12, 1922	Harlem, Georgia	Hanged	1
16	Brown Culpepper (White)	March 13, 1922	Holly Grove, Louisiana	Shot	1
17	Jerry Ingram	March 17, 1922	Crawford, Mississippi	Shot	1
18	Unidentified (white)	March 19, 1922	Okay, Oklahoma	Drowned	1
19	Alexander Smith	March 22, 1922	Gulfport, Mississippi	Hanged	1
20	Snap Curry	May 6, 1922	Kirvin, Texas	Burned	1
21	H. Varney (or Johnnie Cornish)	May 6, 1922	Kirvin, Texas	Burned	1
22	Mose Jones	May 6, 1922	Kirvin, Texas	Burned	1
23	Tom Cornish	May 8, 1922	Kirvin, Texas	Hanged	1
24	Thomas Early	May 17, 1922	Conroe, Texas	Burned	1
25	Charles Atkins	May 18, 1922	Davisboro, Georgia	Burned	1
26	Hullen Owens	May 19, 1922	Texarkana, Texas	Hanged (body burned)	1
27	Joe Winters	May 20, 1922	Conroe, Texas	Burned	1
28	Mose Bozier	May 20, 1922	Alleyton, Texas	Hanged	1
29	Gilbert Wilson	May 23, 1922	Bryan, Texas	Beaten to death	1
30	Jesse Thomas	May 26, 1922	Waco, Texas	Shot (body burned)	1
31	William Byrd	May 28, 1922	Brentwood, Georgia	Shot (body burned)	1
32	Robert Collins	June 20, 1922	Summit, Mississippi	Hanged	1
33	Warren Lewis	June 23, 1922	New Dacus, Texas	Hanged	1
34	James Harvey	July 1, 1922	Lanes Bridge, Georgia	Hanged	1
35	Joe Jordan	July 1, 1922	Lanes Bridge, Georgia	Hanged	1
36	Philip Tankard	July 5, 1922	Belhaven, North Carolina	Shot	1
37	Joe Pemberton	July 7, 1922	Benton, Louisiana	Hanged	1
38	Jake "Shake" Davis	July 14, 1922	Miller County, Georgia	Hanged	1
39	Oscar Mack	July 18, 1922	Orange County, Florida	Hanged (False report, Oscar Mack survived)	1
40	Will Anderson	July 24, 1922	Allentown, Georgia	Shot	1
41	John West	July 28, 1922	Guernsey, Arkansas	Shot	1
42	Gilbert Harris	August 1, 1922	Hot Springs, Arkansas	Hanged	1
43	John Glover	August 1, 1922	Holton,	Shot	1
44	Bayner Blackwell	August 6, 1922	Swansboro, North Carolina	Shot	1
45	John Steelman	August 23, 1922	Lambert, Mississippi	Burned	1
46	Thomas Rivers	August 30, 1922	Bossier Parish, Louisiana	Hanged	1
47	F. Watt Daniels (White)	August 1922	Mer Rouge, Louisiana	Ku-Klux Klan	1
48	Thomas F. Richards (White)	August 1922	Mer Rouge, Louisiana	Ku-Klux Klan	1
49	Jim Reed Long	September 2, 1922	Winder, Georgia	Ku-Klux Klan	1
50	O.J. Johnson	September 7, 1922	Newton, Texas	Hanged	1
51	Jim Johnston	September 28, 1922	Sandersville, Georgia	Hanged	1
52	Grover C. Everett	September 28, 1922	Abilene, Texas	Shot	1
53	John Brown	October 3, 1922	Montgomery, Alabama	Shot	1
54	Ed Hartley (white)	October 20, 1922	Camden, Tennessee	Shot	1
55	George Hartley (white)	October 20, 1922	Camden, Tennessee	Shot	1
56	Elias V. Zarate	November 11, 1922	Weslaco, Texas	Shot	1
57	Cupid Dickson / Cubrit Dixon	December 5, 1922	Madison, Florida	Shot	1
58	Charles Wright	December 8 ,1922	Perry, Florida	Burned	1
59	Less Smith	December 9, 1922	Morrilton, Arkansas	Burned	1
60	George Gay	December 11, 1922	Streetman, Texas	Hanged	1
61	Arthur Young	December 11, 1922	Perry, Florida	Hanged	1
