= Lynching of Elias Zarate =

1922 lynching in Weslaco, Texas, U.S.

Lynching in Weslaco, Texas
- Part of Vigilante Justice
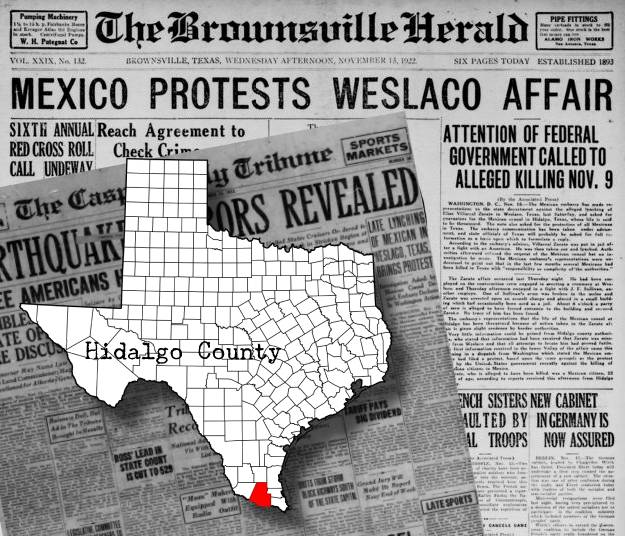
- News coverage of the Lynching of Elias Zarate
- Date: November 11, 1922 (Note: Two dates are given for the lynching: November 9, 1922 and November 11, 1922)
- Location: Weslaco, Hidalgo County, Texas
- Participants: 15 men
- Deaths: Elias Villarael Zarate

Elias Villarael Zarate was a 22-year-old, Mexican immigrant who was lynched in Weslaco, Hidalgo County, Texas by a white mob, his body then being discovered on November 11, 1922. The lynching of Zarate (also known as the Weslaco Affair) was the 15th lynching in Texas. According to the United States Senate Committee on the Judiciary it was the 56th of 61 lynchings during 1922 in the United States.

== Background ==
Texas was a very hostile place towards Mexicans after World War I. According to Lawrence A. Cardoso right after World War I ended, one Mexican national was lynched a week in the state of Texas.

On Thursday, November 9, 1922, Elias V. Zarate was part of a crew erecting a creamery at Weslaco. A fight broke out after a co-worker, J.L. Sullivan, got Zarate fired when Sullivan complained about the quality of his work. In the fight, Sullivan's arm was broken and Zarate was arrested by Weslaco police. Zarate was placed into an unguarded building that was sometimes used as a jail.

== Lynching ==
At 8:00 PM, Thursday, November 9, 1922, a mob of 8-15 (Note: The size of the mob is given as eight strong by one source and 15 strong by another) people were able to break the lock to the temporary jail and forced Zarate at gunpoint into a car. It was hours before the absence was noticed by police. He was never seen alive again and Zarate's body was found on a road 5 miles (8.0 km) from Weslaco on November 11, 1922.

== Aftermath ==
After the lynching, anti-minority sentiment in some Texas cities and towns peaked with large white mobs roaming the streets demanding Blacks and Mexicans leave their areas. On November 16, 1922, hundreds of whites marched through the streets of Breckenridge, Texas. Mexican Consul General Eduardo Ruiz complained to Governor Pat Morris Neff about the lynching and anti-Mexican protests. When this got no response he lodged a complaint with Secretary of State Charles Evans Hughes. Hughes then ordered Governor Neff to act and the Governor rushed extra police to Weslaco who improved the conditions for Mexicans living in the region.

== Annotations ==
Number	Name	Date	Place	Method of lynching	Number of victims
1	Bill McAllister	January 8, 1922	Williamsburg, S.C.	Shot	1
2	Lincoln Hickson	January 8, 1922	Williamsburg, S.C.	Shot	1
3	Willie Jenkins	January 10, 1922	Eufaula, Alabama	Shot	1
4	Jake Brooks	January 14, 1922	Oklahoma City, Oklahoma	Hanged	1
5	Charles Strong	January 17, 1922	Mayo, Florida	Hanged	1
6	Will Bell	January 29, 1922	Pontotoc, Mississippi	Shot	1
7	Unidentified	January 29, 1922	Pontotoc, Mississippi	Shot	
8	Drew Conner (White)	January 28, 1922	Bolinger, Alabama	Burned	1
9	Will Thrasher	February 1, 1922	Crystal Springs, Mississippi	Hanged	1
10	Harry Harrison	February 2, 1922	Malvern, Arkansas	Shot	1
11	Manuel Duarte	February 2, 1922	Cameron County, Texas	Shot	1
12	P. Norman	February 11, 1922	Texarkana, Arkansas	Shot	1
13	Will Jones	February 13, 1922	Ellaville, Georgia	Shot	1
14	William Baker	March 8, 1922	Aberdeen, Mississippi	Hanged	1
15	Alfred Williams	March 12, 1922	Harlem, Georgia	Hanged	1
16	Brown Culpepper (White)	March 13, 1922	Holly Grove, Louisiana	Shot	1
17	Jerry Ingram	March 17, 1922	Crawford, Mississippi	Shot	1
18	Unidentified (white)	March 19, 1922	Okay, Oklahoma	Drowned	1
19	Alexander Smith	March 22, 1922	Gulfport, Mississippi	Hanged	1
20	Snap Curry	May 6, 1922	Kirvin, Texas	Burned	1
21	H. Varney (or Johnnie Cornish)	May 6, 1922	Kirvin, Texas	Burned	1
22	Mose Jones	May 6, 1922	Kirvin, Texas	Burned	1
23	Tom Cornish	May 8, 1922	Kirvin, Texas	Hanged	1
24	Thomas Early	May 17, 1922	Conroe, Texas	Burned	1
25	Charles Atkins	May 18, 1922	Davisboro, Georgia	Burned	1
26	Hullen Owens	May 19, 1922	Texarkana, Texas	Hanged (body burned)	1
27	Joe Winters	May 20, 1922	Conroe, Texas	Burned	1
28	Mose Bozier	May 20, 1922	Alleyton, Texas	Hanged	1
29	Gilbert Wilson	May 23, 1922	Bryan, Texas	Beaten to death	1
30	Jesse Thomas	May 26, 1922	Waco, Texas	Shot (body burned)	1
31	William Byrd	May 28, 1922	Brentwood, Georgia	Shot (body burned)	1
32	Robert Collins	June 20, 1922	Summit, Mississippi	Hanged	1
33	Warren Lewis	June 23, 1922	New Dacus, Texas	Hanged	1
34	James Harvey	July 1, 1922	Lanes Bridge, Georgia	Hanged	1
35	Joe Jordan	July 1, 1922	Lanes Bridge, Georgia	Hanged	1
36	Philip Tankard	July 5, 1922	Belhaven, North Carolina	Shot	1
37	Joe Pemberton	July 7, 1922	Benton, Louisiana	Hanged	1
38	Jake "Shake" Davis	July 14, 1922	Miller County, Georgia	Hanged	1
39	Oscar Mack	July 18, 1922	Orange County, Florida	Hanged (False report, Oscar Mack survived)	1
40	Will Anderson	July 24, 1922	Allentown, Georgia	Shot	1
41	John West	July 28, 1922	Guernsey, Arkansas	Shot	1
42	Gilbert Harris	August 1, 1922	Hot Springs, Arkansas	Hanged	1
43	John Glover	August 1, 1922	Holton,	Shot	1
44	Bayner Blackwell	August 6, 1922	Swansboro, North Carolina	Shot	1
45	John Steelman	August 23, 1922	Lambert, Mississippi	Burned	1
46	Thomas Rivers	August 30, 1922	Bossier Parish, Louisiana	Hanged	1
47	F. Watt Daniels (White)	August 1922	Mer Rouge, Louisiana	Ku-Klux Klan	1
48	Thomas F. Richards (White)	August 1922	Mer Rouge, Louisiana	Ku-Klux Klan	1
49	Jim Reed Long	September 2, 1922	Winder, Georgia	Ku-Klux Klan	1
50	O.J. Johnson	September 7, 1922	Newton, Texas	Hanged	1
51	Jim Johnston	September 28, 1922	Sandersville, Georgia	Hanged	1
52	Grover C. Everett	September 28, 1922	Abilene, Texas	Shot	1
53	John Brown	October 3, 1922	Montgomery, Alabama	Shot	1
54	Ed Hartley (white)	October 20, 1922	Camden, Tennessee	Shot	1
55	George Hartley (white)	October 20, 1922	Camden, Tennessee	Shot	1
56	Elias V. Zarate	November 11, 1922	Weslaco, Texas	Shot	1
57	Cupid Dickson / Cubrit Dixon	December 5, 1922	Madison, Florida	Shot	1
58	Charles Wright	December 8 ,1922	Perry, Florida	Burned	1
59	Less Smith	December 9, 1922	Morrilton, Arkansas	Burned	1
60	George Gay	December 11, 1922	Streetman, Texas	Hanged	1
61	Arthur Young	December 11, 1922	Perry, Florida	Hanged	1
