= Lynching of Jesse Thomas =

1922 lynching in Waco, Texas, U.S.

Lynching in Texarkana, Texas
- Part of Jim Crow Era
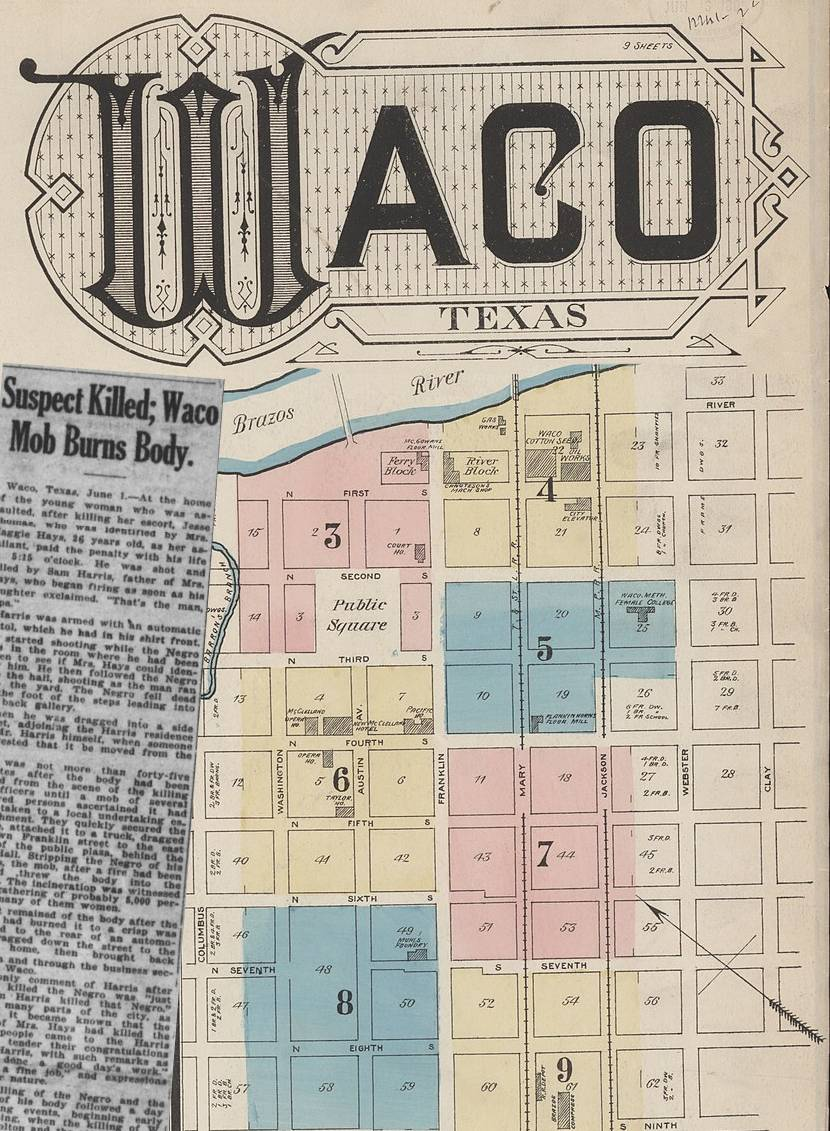
- Location of Franklin Ave where Jesse Thomas body was dragged and the public square where his body was burnt
- Date: May 26, 1922
- Location: Waco, McLennan County, Texas
- Participants: Sam Harris shot Jesse, then a large mob some 6,000 strong burnt the body
- Deaths: Jesse Thomas

Jesse Thomas was a 23-year-old, African-American man who was murdered in Waco, McLennan County, Texas by Sam Harris on May 26, 1922. A large mob then seized the body from the undertaker and burnt it in Waco's public square. The lynching of Jesse Thomas was the 10th lynching in 20-days in Texas and according to the United States Senate Committee on the Judiciary it was the 30th of 61 lynchings during 1922 in the United States.

Thomas was later proven innocent, with the actual perpetrator of the crimes he was accused of being serial killer Roy Mitchell.

== Background ==
Jesse Thomas was a service car driver, married and lived in South Waco.

On early Friday, May 26, 1922, 25-years-old, W. Harry Bolton was driving with, 26-years-old, Mrs. Maggie Hays. (Note: Sometimes spelled as Hayes) During their drive a man carjacked, and murdered Bolton. Maggie Hays told investigators that the assailant was going to shoot her too but his gun jammed. The man then told Maggie the attack was in revenge for the 9 lynchings of African-Americans in Texas in the last 20 days. The man then left the scene by jumping on a passing cargo train. Maggie Hays went to police and gave them a description of her assailant. Due to the extreme nature of the crime, Waco Chief of Police Jenkins deputized a number of citizens to help out in the investigation.

== Killing of Jesse Thomas ==
E.L. McClure, a telegraph operator, was one of those who had been deputized as an officer of the law. He was driving with his wife when he saw Jesse Thomas, who he thought met the description of the person who attacked Bolton and Maggie Hays. To get him in the car, McClure told Jesse Thomas that he had some work cutting grass. Once Jesse Thomas was in McClure's car, on his own initiative, McClure took Jesse to the home of Maggie Hays. When Maggie saw Jesse she shouted to her father Sam Harris, "That's the man, papa." At 5:15 PM, in a fit of rage, Harris shot Jesse Thomas seven times as Thomas desperately tried to escape the house. Thomas with multiple bullet wounds died on the house's steps to the backyard. The body was then taken to the local undertaker.

== Burning of the body ==
News of the shooting had quickly spread throughout the region and thousands began pouring into the downtown area. A mob of 6,000 people pushed their way into the funeral parlour where Jesse's body was sent after being killed by Sam Harris. The corpse was yanked out of the funeral parlour, tied to a truck and dragged through Waco on Franklin Ave. Some of the mob had prepared a large pyre, of cordwood, in the public square, behind the City Hall. When the truck dragging the corpse arrived they threw the body on the pyre and lit it on fire. After the fire died down they again tied the corpse to a truck and dragged it through the Black part of town. As the burnt body was being tied to the truck members of the white mob scrambled to break off fingers and other appendages from the charred skeleton as souvenirs.

== Aftermath ==
Earlier in the day, Constable Leslie Stegall had arrested a Black man that met the description of the attacker given by Maggie Hays, Sank Johnson. Chief of Police Jenkins thought that Johnson was guilty of the crime as his shoes matched the imprints left at the crime scene. In addition to Johnson there were four other men in the jail that matched the description given by Maggie. The Texas Rangers were called in to protect these suspects from the lynch mob.

The family of Jesse Thomas proclaimed his innocence and presented compelling evidence that he was at home with them at the time of the carjacking and assault of Maggie Hays. Thomas was later proven innocent, with the actual killer of W. Harry Bolton and rapist of Maggie Hays being serial killer Roy Mitchell.

Sam Harris, the man who publicly claimed to have shot Jesse Thomas, offered to surrender to the authorities, but they refused to press charges for the murder of Jesse Thomas.

== National memorial ==
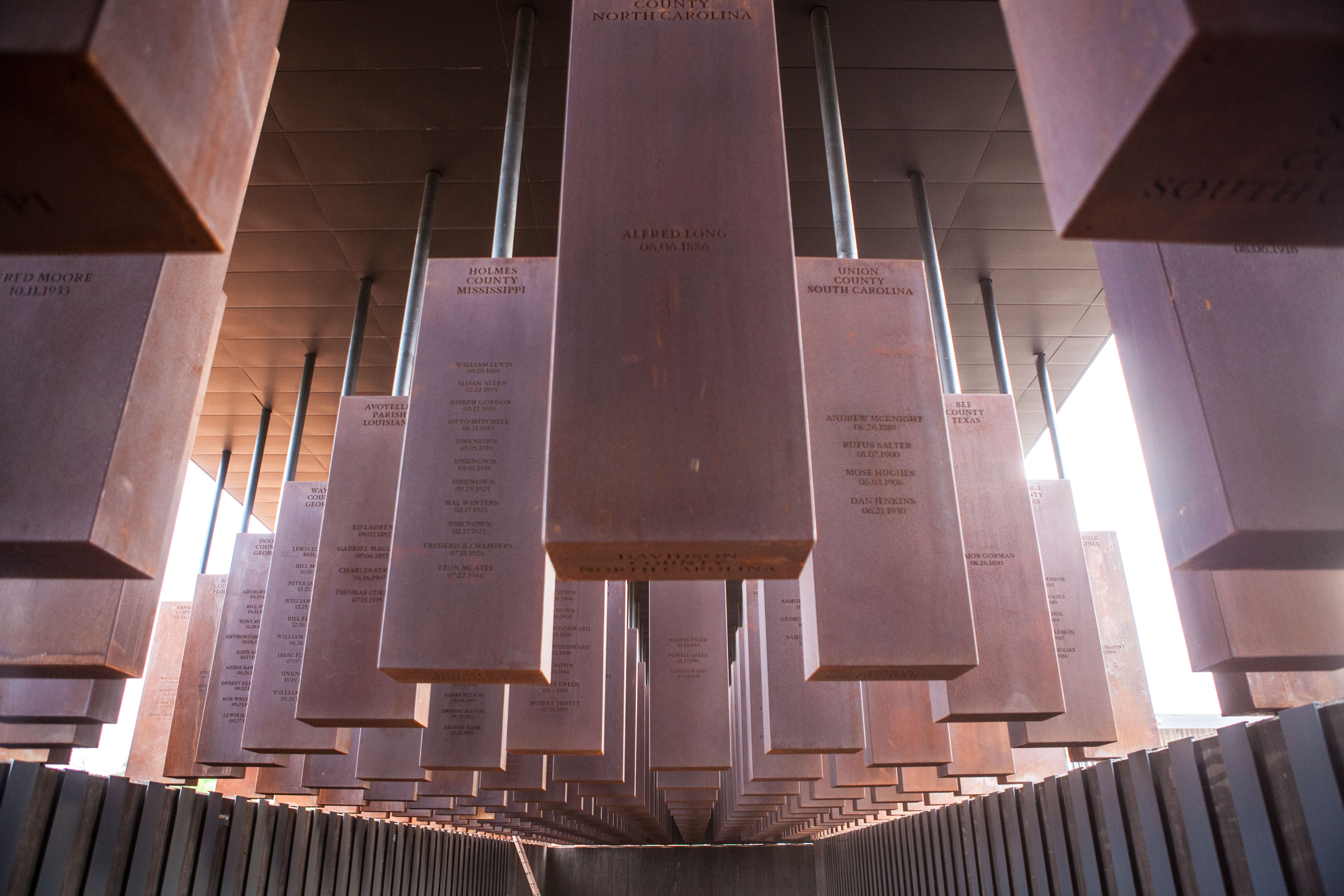
Memorial Corridor, National Memorial for Peace and Justice

The National Memorial for Peace and Justice, in Montgomery, Alabama, displays 805 hanging steel rectangles, each representing the counties in the United States where a documented lynching took place and, for each county, the names of those lynched. The memorial hopes that communities, like McLennan County, Texas where Jesse Thomas was lynched, will take their slab and install it in their own community.

== Annotations ==
Number	Name	Date	Place	Method of lynching	Number of victims
1	Bill McAllister	January 8, 1922	Williamsburg, S.C.	Shot	1
2	Lincoln Hickson	January 8, 1922	Williamsburg, S.C.	Shot	1
3	Willie Jenkins	January 10, 1922	Eufaula, Alabama	Shot	1
4	Jake Brooks	January 14, 1922	Oklahoma City, Oklahoma	Hanged	1
5	Charles Strong	January 17, 1922	Mayo, Florida	Hanged	1
6	Will Bell	January 29, 1922	Pontotoc, Mississippi	Shot	1
7	Unidentified	January 29, 1922	Pontotoc, Mississippi	Shot	
8	Drew Conner (White)	January 28, 1922	Bolinger, Alabama	Burned	1
9	Will Thrasher	February 1, 1922	Crystal Springs, Mississippi	Hanged	1
10	Harry Harrison	February 2, 1922	Malvern, Arkansas	Shot	1
11	Manuel Duarte	February 2, 1922	Cameron County, Texas	Shot	1
12	P. Norman	February 11, 1922	Texarkana, Arkansas	Shot	1
13	Will Jones	February 13, 1922	Ellaville, Georgia	Shot	1
14	William Baker	March 8, 1922	Aberdeen, Mississippi	Hanged	1
15	Alfred Williams	March 12, 1922	Harlem, Georgia	Hanged	1
16	Brown Culpepper (White)	March 13, 1922	Holly Grove, Louisiana	Shot	1
17	Jerry Ingram	March 17, 1922	Crawford, Mississippi	Shot	1
18	Unidentified (white)	March 19, 1922	Okay, Oklahoma	Drowned	1
19	Alexander Smith	March 22, 1922	Gulfport, Mississippi	Hanged	1
20	Snap Curry	May 6, 1922	Kirvin, Texas	Burned	1
21	H. Varney (or Johnnie Cornish)	May 6, 1922	Kirvin, Texas	Burned	1
22	Mose Jones	May 6, 1922	Kirvin, Texas	Burned	1
23	Tom Cornish	May 8, 1922	Kirvin, Texas	Hanged	1
24	Thomas Early	May 17, 1922	Conroe, Texas	Burned	1
25	Charles Atkins	May 18, 1922	Davisboro, Georgia	Burned	1
26	Hullen Owens	May 19, 1922	Texarkana, Texas	Hanged (body burned)	1
27	Joe Winters	May 20, 1922	Conroe, Texas	Burned	1
28	Mose Bozier	May 20, 1922	Alleyton, Texas	Hanged	1
29	Gilbert Wilson	May 23, 1922	Bryan, Texas	Beaten to death	1
30	Jesse Thomas	May 26, 1922	Waco, Texas	Shot (body burned)	1
31	William Byrd	May 28, 1922	Brentwood, Georgia	Shot (body burned)	1
32	Robert Collins	June 20, 1922	Summit, Mississippi	Hanged	1
33	Warren Lewis	June 23, 1922	New Dacus, Texas	Hanged	1
34	James Harvey	July 1, 1922	Lanes Bridge, Georgia	Hanged	1
35	Joe Jordan	July 1, 1922	Lanes Bridge, Georgia	Hanged	1
36	Philip Tankard	July 5, 1922	Belhaven, North Carolina	Shot	1
37	Joe Pemberton	July 7, 1922	Benton, Louisiana	Hanged	1
38	Jake "Shake" Davis	July 14, 1922	Miller County, Georgia	Hanged	1
39	Oscar Mack	July 18, 1922	Orange County, Florida	Hanged (False report, Oscar Mack survived)	1
40	Will Anderson	July 24, 1922	Allentown, Georgia	Shot	1
41	John West	July 28, 1922	Guernsey, Arkansas	Shot	1
42	Gilbert Harris	August 1, 1922	Hot Springs, Arkansas	Hanged	1
43	John Glover	August 1, 1922	Holton,	Shot	1
44	Bayner Blackwell	August 6, 1922	Swansboro, North Carolina	Shot	1
45	John Steelman	August 23, 1922	Lambert, Mississippi	Burned	1
46	Thomas Rivers	August 30, 1922	Bossier Parish, Louisiana	Hanged	1
47	F. Watt Daniels (White)	August 1922	Mer Rouge, Louisiana	Ku-Klux Klan	1
48	Thomas F. Richards (White)	August 1922	Mer Rouge, Louisiana	Ku-Klux Klan	1
49	Jim Reed Long	September 2, 1922	Winder, Georgia	Ku-Klux Klan	1
50	O.J. Johnson	September 7, 1922	Newton, Texas	Hanged	1
51	Jim Johnston	September 28, 1922	Sandersville, Georgia	Hanged	1
52	Grover C. Everett	September 28, 1922	Abilene, Texas	Shot	1
53	John Brown	October 3, 1922	Montgomery, Alabama	Shot	1
54	Ed Hartley (white)	October 20, 1922	Camden, Tennessee	Shot	1
55	George Hartley (white)	October 20, 1922	Camden, Tennessee	Shot	1
56	Elias V. Zarate	November 11, 1922	Weslaco, Texas	Shot	1
57	Cupid Dickson / Cubrit Dixon	December 5, 1922	Madison, Florida	Shot	1
58	Charles Wright	December 8 ,1922	Perry, Florida	Burned	1
59	Less Smith	December 9, 1922	Morrilton, Arkansas	Burned	1
60	George Gay	December 11, 1922	Streetman, Texas	Hanged	1
61	Arthur Young	December 11, 1922	Perry, Florida	Hanged	1
