= Kirvin, Texas =

- Town
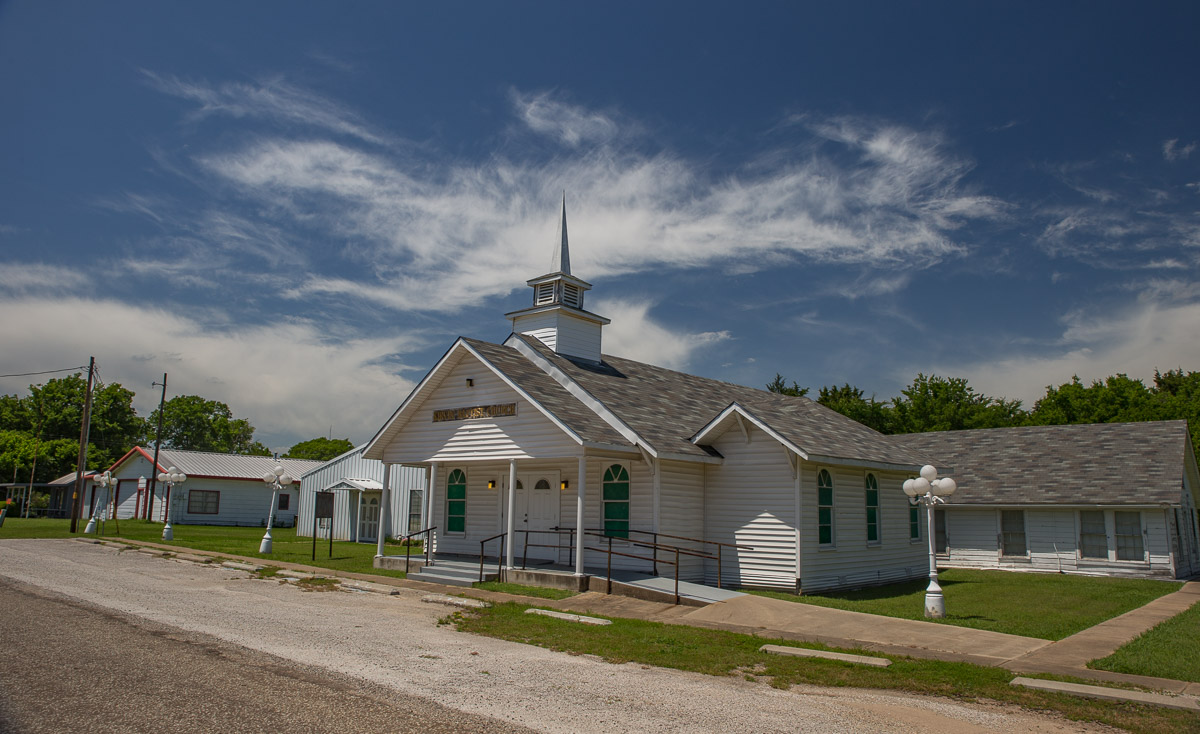
- Kirvin Baptist Church

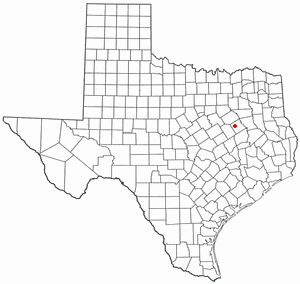
- Location of Kirvin, Texas

- Coordinates: 31°46′02″N 96°19′48″W
- Country: United States
- State: Texas
- County: Freestone

Area
  - Total: 0.40 sq mi (1.04 km^{2})
  - Land: 0.40 sq mi (1.04 km^{2})
  - Water: 0 sq mi (0.00 km^{2})
- Elevation: 459 ft (140 m)

Population (2020)
  - Total: 101
  - Density: 252/sq mi (97.1/km^{2})
- Time zone: UTC-6 (Central (CST))
  - Summer (DST): UTC-5 (CDT)
- ZIP code: 75848
- Area code: 254
- FIPS code: 48-39520
- GNIS feature ID: 2412841

Kirvin is a town in Freestone County, Texas, United States. The population was 101 at the 2020 census.

== History ==
On May 6, 1922, three local African-American men were lynched in Kirvin by being mutilated and then burned alive for the alleged murder of a 17-year-old white girl, Eula Ausley. Their names were Snap Curry, Mose Jones and Johnny Cornish. Some 500 local Kirvin townsfolk, including the victim's grandfather, took part in the killings. Evidence now points to the innocence of at least two of the three victims. During the next month, there were several more instances of lynching by hanging of other black men in the area. Ausley is buried in the Shanks Memorial Cemetery in Kirvin, on 950 just east of FM 80. A book by Monte Akers titled Flames After Midnight: Murder, Vengeance, and the Desolation of a Texas Community was written about the incident. Two white men who were suspects in the Ausley killing were never charged-despite bloody tracks from the murder scene to their house.

== Geography ==
Kirvin is located in northwestern Freestone County and is 10 miles (16 km) northwest of Fairfield, the county seat, and 8 miles (13 km) east of Wortham.

According to the United States Census Bureau, the town of Kirvin has a total area of 0.40 square miles (1.04 km^{2}), all land.

== Demographics ==
Historical population
Census	Pop.	Note	%±
1920	288		—
1930	238		−17.4%
1940	231		−2.9%
1950	152		−34.2%
1960	81		−46.7%
1970	65		−19.8%
1980	107		64.6%
1990	107		0.0%
2000	122		14.0%
2010	129		5.7%
2020	101		−21.7%
U.S. Decennial Census; 2020 Census

As of the census of 2000, there were 122 people, 41 households, and 28 families residing in the town. The population density was 303.0 inhabitants per square mile (117.0/km^{2}). There were 51 housing units at an average density of 126.6 per square mile (48.9/km^{2}). The racial makeup of the town was 85.25% White, 8.20% African American, 4.92% from other races, and 1.64% from two or more races. Hispanic or Latino of any race were 4.92% of the population.

There were 41 households, out of which 43.9% had children under the age of 18 living with them, 48.8% were married couples living together, 9.8% had a female householder with no husband present, and 31.7% were non-families. 29.3% of all households were made up of individuals, and 17.1% had someone living alone who was 65 years of age or older. The average household size was 2.98 and the average family size was 3.64.

In the town, the population was spread out, with 33.6% under the age of 18, 13.1% from 18 to 24, 24.6% from 25 to 44, 16.4% from 45 to 64, and 12.3% who were 65 years of age or older. The median age was 27 years. For every 100 females, there were 96.8 males. For every 100 females age 18 and over, there were 88.4 males.

The median income for a household in the town was $36,250, and the median income for a family was $42,500. Males had a median income of $35,625 versus $13,125 for females. The per capita income for the town was $12,320. There were 3.6% of families and 5.8% of the population living below the poverty line, including 5.0% of under eighteens and 14.3% of those over 64.

== Education ==
Kirvin is served by the Wortham Independent School District.
