= Lynching in Kirvin, Texas =

- Part of Jim Crow Era
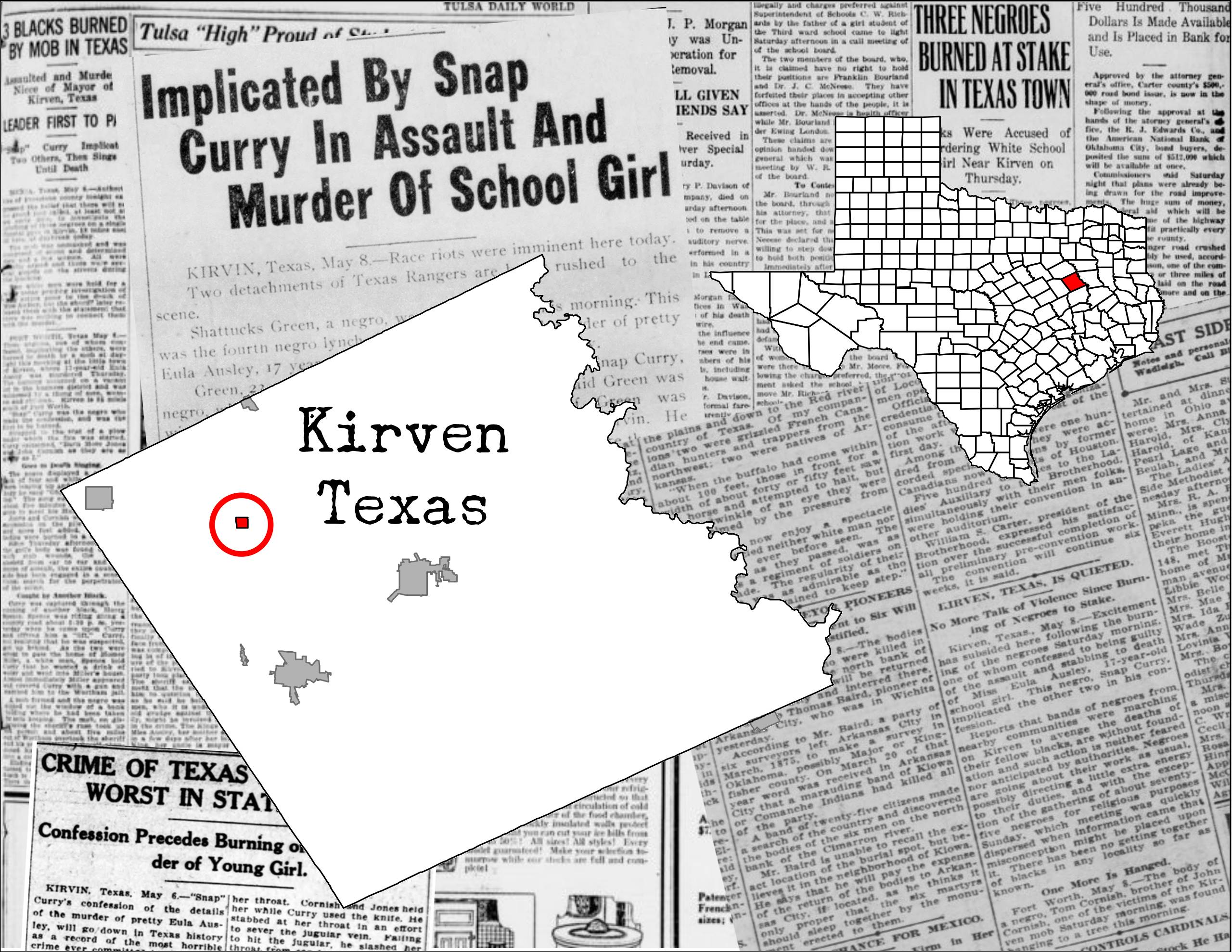
- Kirvin Lynching news coverage
- Date: May 6, 1922
- Location: Kirvin, Texas, US
- Participants: A white mob of Kirvin, Texas, lynched three Black men
- Deaths: McKinley "Snap" Curry (23); Johnny Cornish (19); Mose Jones (46)

Three Black men were lynched in Kirvin, Texas for allegedly murdering a young girl. According to the United States Senate Committee on the Judiciary it was the 19th of 61 lynchings during 1922 in the United States.

== Background ==
On May 4, 1922, on the last day of school in Kirvin, Texas, 17-year-old Eula Ausley was on her way home from school when she was grabbed from her horse, sexually assaulted and then mutilated. Her absence was noticed and a search party was sent out. They came across the body and the search party turned into a posse of 1,000 men armed with whatever weapon they had. Eula Ausley's family was in a feud with another family and the local Sheriff Horace Mayo already had two white suspects of that family in custody when the wife of McKinley "Snap" Curry told the Sheriff that he had suspiciously come home with blood on his clothes. The Sheriff changed the course of the investigation and arrested Curry. Under interrogation, he implicated two other men, Johnny Cornish (19) and Mose Jones (46). The three were arrested and held in jail.

== Lynching ==
At midnight of May 6, the mob forced its way into the prison and dragged the three men out of the jail. The men were tortured on a lot between the old Baptist Church and the Methodist Church in Kirvin. Some reports state that they were castrated but at least two were burned alive. The victims were forced to watch as the others were tied to a plow, had wood stacked around them, doused with gasoline and lit on fire.

One paper reported that Tom Cornish was hanged from a tree.

== Aftermath ==
The two white men, Claude and Audey Prowell, who were initially arrested, were released and the sheriff released a statement that they were not involved in the murder of Eula Ausley. Author Monte Akers in his book Flames After Midnight: Murder, Vengeance and the Desolation of a Texas Community, concluded that McKinley "Snap" Curry conspired with Claude and Audey Prowell to kill Eula Ausley and that Mose Jones and Johnny Cornish were innocent.

== Bibliography ==
Notes

References

- Akers, Monte (2011). Flames After Midnight: Murder, Vengeance and the Desolation of a Texas Community. University of Texas Press. ISBN 9780292726338. - Total pages: 274
- "3 Black Burned by mob in Texas". The Morning Tulsa Daily World. Tulsa, Oklahoma: World Pub. Co. May 7, 1922. pp. 1–74. ISSN 2163-4637. OCLC 12228935.
- "Kirven, Texas is Quieted". The Topeka State Journal. Topeka, Shawnee, Kansas. May 8, 1922. pp. 1–10. ISSN 2377-7117. OCLC 9124974.
- United States Senate Committee on the Judiciary (1926). "To Prevent and Punish the Crime of Lynching: Hearings Before the United States Senate Committee on the Judiciary, Subcommittee on S. 121, Sixty-Ninth Congress, First Session, on Feb. 16, 1926". United States Government Publishing Office.

| Number | Name | Date | Place | Method of lynching | Number of victims |
|---|---|---|---|---|---|
| 1 | Bill McAllister | January 8, 1922 | Williamsburg, S.C. | Shot | 1 |
| 2 | Lincoln Hickson | January 8, 1922 | Williamsburg, S.C. | Shot | 1 |
| 3 | Willie Jenkins | January 10, 1922 | Eufaula, Alabama | Shot | 1 |
| 4 | Jake Brooks | January 14, 1922 | Oklahoma City, Oklahoma | Hanged | 1 |
| 5 | Charles Strong | January 17, 1922 | Mayo, Florida | Hanged | 1 |
| 6 | Will Bell | January 29, 1922 | Pontotoc, Mississippi | Shot | 1 |
| 7 | Unidentified | January 29, 1922 | Pontotoc, Mississippi | Shot | |
| 8 | Drew Conner (White) | January 28, 1922 | Bolinger, Alabama | Burned | 1 |
| 9 | Will Thrasher | February 1, 1922 | Crystal Springs, Mississippi | Hanged | 1 |
| 10 | Harry Harrison | February 2, 1922 | Malvern, Arkansas | Shot | 1 |
| 11 | Manuel Duarte | February 2, 1922 | Cameron County, Texas | Shot | 1 |
| 12 | P. Norman | February 11, 1922 | Texarkana, Arkansas | Shot | 1 |
| 13 | Will Jones | February 13, 1922 | Ellaville, Georgia | Shot | 1 |
| 14 | William Baker | March 8, 1922 | Aberdeen, Mississippi | Hanged | 1 |
| 15 | Alfred Williams | March 12, 1922 | Harlem, Georgia | Hanged | 1 |
| 16 | Brown Culpepper (White) | March 13, 1922 | Holly Grove, Louisiana | Shot | 1 |
| 17 | Jerry Ingram | March 17, 1922 | Crawford, Mississippi | Shot | 1 |
| 18 | Unidentified (white) | March 19, 1922 | Okay, Oklahoma | Drowned | 1 |
| 19 | Alexander Smith | March 22, 1922 | Gulfport, Mississippi | Hanged | 1 |
| 20 | Snap Curry | May 6, 1922 | Kirvin, Texas | Burned | 1 |
| 21 | H. Varney (or Johnnie Cornish) | May 6, 1922 | Kirvin, Texas | Burned | 1 |
| 22 | Mose Jones | May 6, 1922 | Kirvin, Texas | Burned | 1 |
| 23 | Tom Cornish | May 8, 1922 | Kirvin, Texas | Hanged | 1 |
| 24 | Thomas Early | May 17, 1922 | Conroe, Texas | Burned | 1 |
| 25 | Charles Atkins | May 18, 1922 | Davisboro, Georgia | Burned | 1 |
| 26 | Hullen Owens | May 19, 1922 | Texarkana, Texas | Hanged (body burned) | 1 |
| 27 | Joe Winters | May 20, 1922 | Conroe, Texas | Burned | 1 |
| 28 | Mose Bozier | May 20, 1922 | Alleyton, Texas | Hanged | 1 |
| 29 | Gilbert Wilson | May 23, 1922 | Bryan, Texas | Beaten to death | 1 |
| 30 | Jesse Thomas | May 26, 1922 | Waco, Texas | Shot (body burned) | 1 |
| 31 | William Byrd | May 28, 1922 | Brentwood, Georgia | Shot (body burned) | 1 |
| 32 | Robert Collins | June 20, 1922 | Summit, Mississippi | Hanged | 1 |
| 33 | Warren Lewis | June 23, 1922 | New Dacus, Texas | Hanged | 1 |
| 34 | James Harvey | July 1, 1922 | Lanes Bridge, Georgia | Hanged | 1 |
| 35 | Joe Jordan | July 1, 1922 | Lanes Bridge, Georgia | Hanged | 1 |
| 36 | Philip Tankard | July 5, 1922 | Belhaven, North Carolina | Shot | 1 |
| 37 | Joe Pemberton | July 7, 1922 | Benton, Louisiana | Hanged | 1 |
| 38 | Jake "Shake" Davis | July 14, 1922 | Miller County, Georgia | Hanged | 1 |
| 39 | Oscar Mack | July 18, 1922 | Orange County, Florida | Hanged (False report, Oscar Mack survived) | 1 |
| 40 | Will Anderson | July 24, 1922 | Allentown, Georgia | Shot | 1 |
| 41 | John West | July 28, 1922 | Guernsey, Arkansas | Shot | 1 |
| 42 | Gilbert Harris | August 1, 1922 | Hot Springs, Arkansas | Hanged | 1 |
| 43 | John Glover | August 1, 1922 | Holton, | Shot | 1 |
| 44 | Bayner Blackwell | August 6, 1922 | Swansboro, North Carolina | Shot | 1 |
| 45 | John Steelman | August 23, 1922 | Lambert, Mississippi | Burned | 1 |
| 46 | Thomas Rivers | August 30, 1922 | Bossier Parish, Louisiana | Hanged | 1 |
| 47 | F. Watt Daniels (White) | August 1922 | Mer Rouge, Louisiana | Ku-Klux Klan | 1 |
| 48 | Thomas F. Richards (White) | August 1922 | Mer Rouge, Louisiana | Ku-Klux Klan | 1 |
| 49 | Jim Reed Long | September 2, 1922 | Winder, Georgia | Ku-Klux Klan | 1 |
| 50 | O.J. Johnson | September 7, 1922 | Newton, Texas | Hanged | 1 |
| 51 | Jim Johnston | September 28, 1922 | Sandersville, Georgia | Hanged | 1 |
| 52 | Grover C. Everett | September 28, 1922 | Abilene, Texas | Shot | 1 |
| 53 | John Brown | October 3, 1922 | Montgomery, Alabama | Shot | 1 |
| 54 | Ed Hartley (white) | October 20, 1922 | Camden, Tennessee | Shot | 1 |
| 55 | George Hartley (white) | October 20, 1922 | Camden, Tennessee | Shot | 1 |
| 56 | Elias V. Zarate | November 11, 1922 | Weslaco, Texas | Shot | 1 |
| 57 | Cupid Dickson / Cubrit Dixon | December 5, 1922 | Madison, Florida | Shot | 1 |
| 58 | Charles Wright | December 8 ,1922 | Perry, Florida | Burned | 1 |
| 59 | Less Smith | December 9, 1922 | Morrilton, Arkansas | Burned | 1 |
| 60 | George Gay | December 11, 1922 | Streetman, Texas | Hanged | 1 |
| 61 | Arthur Young | December 11, 1922 | Perry, Florida | Hanged | 1 |
