= Lynching of Alex Smith =

- Part of Jim Crow Era
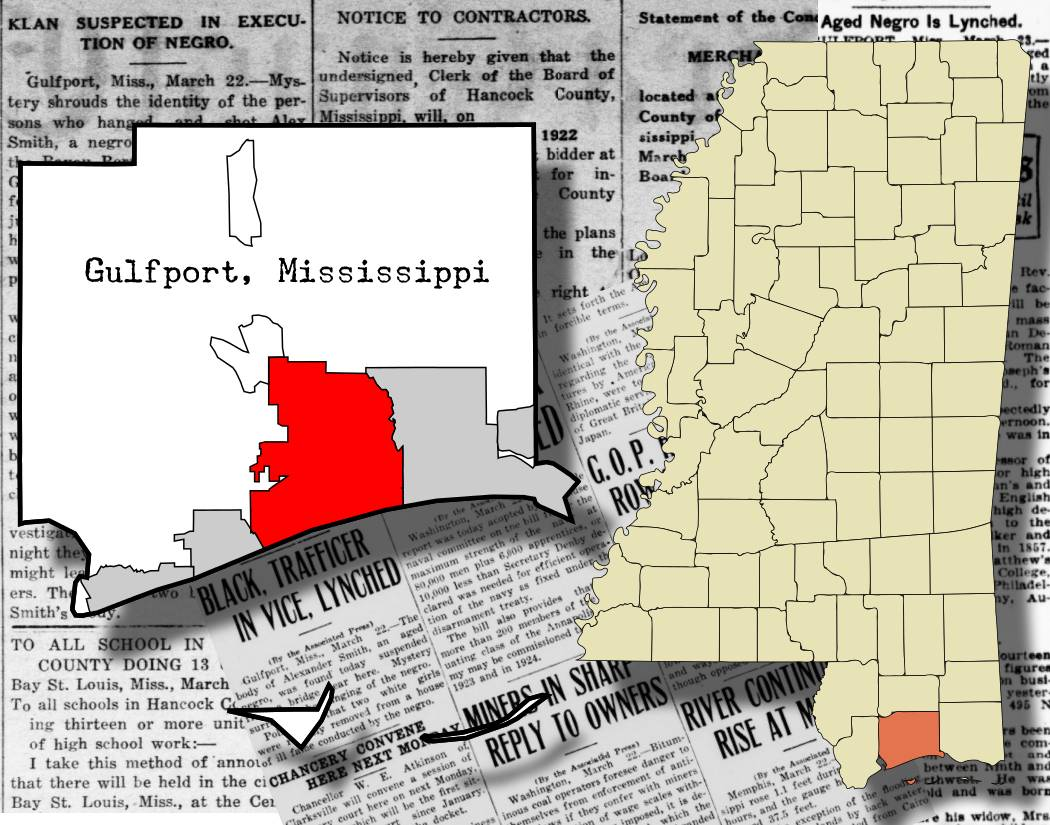
- News coverage of the Lynching of Alex Smith in Gulfport, 1922
- Date: March 22, 1922
- Location: Gulfport, Harrison County, Mississippi
- Participants: Suspected members of the Klan

Alex Smith was a 60-year-old African-American man who was lynched in Gulfport, Harrison County, Mississippi by unknown attackers on March 22, 1922. According to the United States Senate Committee on the Judiciary it was the 19th of 61 lynchings during 1922 in the United States.

== Background ==
Alex or Alexander Smith, from the Bayou Bernard bridge area, allegedly ran "a house of ill fame" that was raided early 1922 on the fringes of Gulfport. News reports at the time state that inside, "white girls and young white men" were found. He was released and under bond to appear for his trial.

== Lynching ==
Smith was seized and the coroner's report stated that he "came to his death by strangulation and pistol wounds at the hands of unknown persons" on March 22, 1922. His body was found hanging from a bridge with multiple bullet wounds. Newspapers at the time stated that the Ku Klux Klan was rumored to have had a "party" to execute Smith.

== See also ==
- Will Bell was lynched on January 29, 1922, in Pontotoc, Mississippi.
- Will Thrasher was lynched on February 1, 1922, in Crystal Springs, Mississippi.
- William Baker was lynched on March 8, 1922, in Aberdeen, Mississippi.
- Robert Collins was lynched on June 20, 1922, Summit, Mississippi.
- John Steelman was lynched on August 23, 1922, in Lambert, Mississippi.

== Bibliography ==
Notes

References

- "Black, trafficer in vice, lynched". The Log Cabin Democrat. Conway, Faulkner, Arkansas: Conway Print. Co. March 22, 1922. pp. 1–4. ISSN 2692-9090. OCLC 12956845.
- "Klan suspected in execution of Negro". The Sea Coast Echo. Bay Saint Louis, Hancock, Mississippi: Charles G. Moreau. April 1, 1922. pp. 1–4. ISSN 2576-7976. OCLC 14470132.
- United States Senate Committee on the Judiciary (1926). "To Prevent and Punish the Crime of Lynching: Hearings Before the United States Senate Committee on the Judiciary, Subcommittee on S. 121, Sixty-Ninth Congress, First Session, on Feb. 16, 1926". United States Government Publishing Office.
- "Aged Negro is lynched". The Washington Times. Washington, District of Columbia: William Randolph Hearst. March 23, 1922. pp. 1–24. ISSN 1941-0697. OCLC 10630160.

Number	Name	Date	Place	Method of lynching	Number of victims
1	Bill McAllister	January 8, 1922	Williamsburg, S.C.	Shot	1
2	Lincoln Hickson	January 8, 1922	Williamsburg, S.C.	Shot	1
3	Willie Jenkins	January 10, 1922	Eufaula, Alabama	Shot	1
4	Jake Brooks	January 14, 1922	Oklahoma City, Oklahoma	Hanged	1
5	Charles Strong	January 17, 1922	Mayo, Florida	Hanged	1
6	Will Bell	January 29, 1922	Pontotoc, Mississippi	Shot	1
7	Unidentified	January 29, 1922	Pontotoc, Mississippi	Shot	
8	Drew Conner (White)	January 28, 1922	Bolinger, Alabama	Burned	1
9	Will Thrasher	February 1, 1922	Crystal Springs, Mississippi	Hanged	1
10	Harry Harrison	February 2, 1922	Malvern, Arkansas	Shot	1
11	Manuel Duarte	February 2, 1922	Cameron County, Texas	Shot	1
12	P. Norman	February 11, 1922	Texarkana, Arkansas	Shot	1
13	Will Jones	February 13, 1922	Ellaville, Georgia	Shot	1
14	William Baker	March 8, 1922	Aberdeen, Mississippi	Hanged	1
15	Alfred Williams	March 12, 1922	Harlem, Georgia	Hanged	1
16	Brown Culpepper (White)	March 13, 1922	Holly Grove, Louisiana	Shot	1
17	Jerry Ingram	March 17, 1922	Crawford, Mississippi	Shot	1
18	Unidentified (white)	March 19, 1922	Okay, Oklahoma	Drowned	1
19	Alexander Smith	March 22, 1922	Gulfport, Mississippi	Hanged	1
20	Snap Curry	May 6, 1922	Kirvin, Texas	Burned	1
21	H. Varney (or Johnnie Cornish)	May 6, 1922	Kirvin, Texas	Burned	1
22	Mose Jones	May 6, 1922	Kirvin, Texas	Burned	1
23	Tom Cornish	May 8, 1922	Kirvin, Texas	Hanged	1
24	Thomas Early	May 17, 1922	Conroe, Texas	Burned	1
25	Charles Atkins	May 18, 1922	Davisboro, Georgia	Burned	1
26	Hullen Owens	May 19, 1922	Texarkana, Texas	Hanged (body burned)	1
27	Joe Winters	May 20, 1922	Conroe, Texas	Burned	1
28	Mose Bozier	May 20, 1922	Alleyton, Texas	Hanged	1
29	Gilbert Wilson	May 23, 1922	Bryan, Texas	Beaten to death	1
30	Jesse Thomas	May 26, 1922	Waco, Texas	Shot (body burned)	1
31	William Byrd	May 28, 1922	Brentwood, Georgia	Shot (body burned)	1
32	Robert Collins	June 20, 1922	Summit, Mississippi	Hanged	1
33	Warren Lewis	June 23, 1922	New Dacus, Texas	Hanged	1
34	James Harvey	July 1, 1922	Lanes Bridge, Georgia	Hanged	1
35	Joe Jordan	July 1, 1922	Lanes Bridge, Georgia	Hanged	1
36	Philip Tankard	July 5, 1922	Belhaven, North Carolina	Shot	1
37	Joe Pemberton	July 7, 1922	Benton, Louisiana	Hanged	1
38	Jake "Shake" Davis	July 14, 1922	Miller County, Georgia	Hanged	1
39	Oscar Mack	July 18, 1922	Orange County, Florida	Hanged (False report, Oscar Mack survived)	1
40	Will Anderson	July 24, 1922	Allentown, Georgia	Shot	1
41	John West	July 28, 1922	Guernsey, Arkansas	Shot	1
42	Gilbert Harris	August 1, 1922	Hot Springs, Arkansas	Hanged	1
43	John Glover	August 1, 1922	Holton,	Shot	1
44	Bayner Blackwell	August 6, 1922	Swansboro, North Carolina	Shot	1
45	John Steelman	August 23, 1922	Lambert, Mississippi	Burned	1
46	Thomas Rivers	August 30, 1922	Bossier Parish, Louisiana	Hanged	1
47	F. Watt Daniels (White)	August 1922	Mer Rouge, Louisiana	Ku-Klux Klan	1
48	Thomas F. Richards (White)	August 1922	Mer Rouge, Louisiana	Ku-Klux Klan	1
49	Jim Reed Long	September 2, 1922	Winder, Georgia	Ku-Klux Klan	1
50	O.J. Johnson	September 7, 1922	Newton, Texas	Hanged	1
51	Jim Johnston	September 28, 1922	Sandersville, Georgia	Hanged	1
52	Grover C. Everett	September 28, 1922	Abilene, Texas	Shot	1
53	John Brown	October 3, 1922	Montgomery, Alabama	Shot	1
54	Ed Hartley (white)	October 20, 1922	Camden, Tennessee	Shot	1
55	George Hartley (white)	October 20, 1922	Camden, Tennessee	Shot	1
56	Elias V. Zarate	November 11, 1922	Weslaco, Texas	Shot	1
57	Cupid Dickson / Cubrit Dixon	December 5, 1922	Madison, Florida	Shot	1
58	Charles Wright	December 8 ,1922	Perry, Florida	Burned	1
59	Less Smith	December 9, 1922	Morrilton, Arkansas	Burned	1
60	George Gay	December 11, 1922	Streetman, Texas	Hanged	1
61	Arthur Young	December 11, 1922	Perry, Florida	Hanged	1
