= Lynching of Will Bell =

1922 lynching in Mississippi, United States

- Part of Jim Crow Era
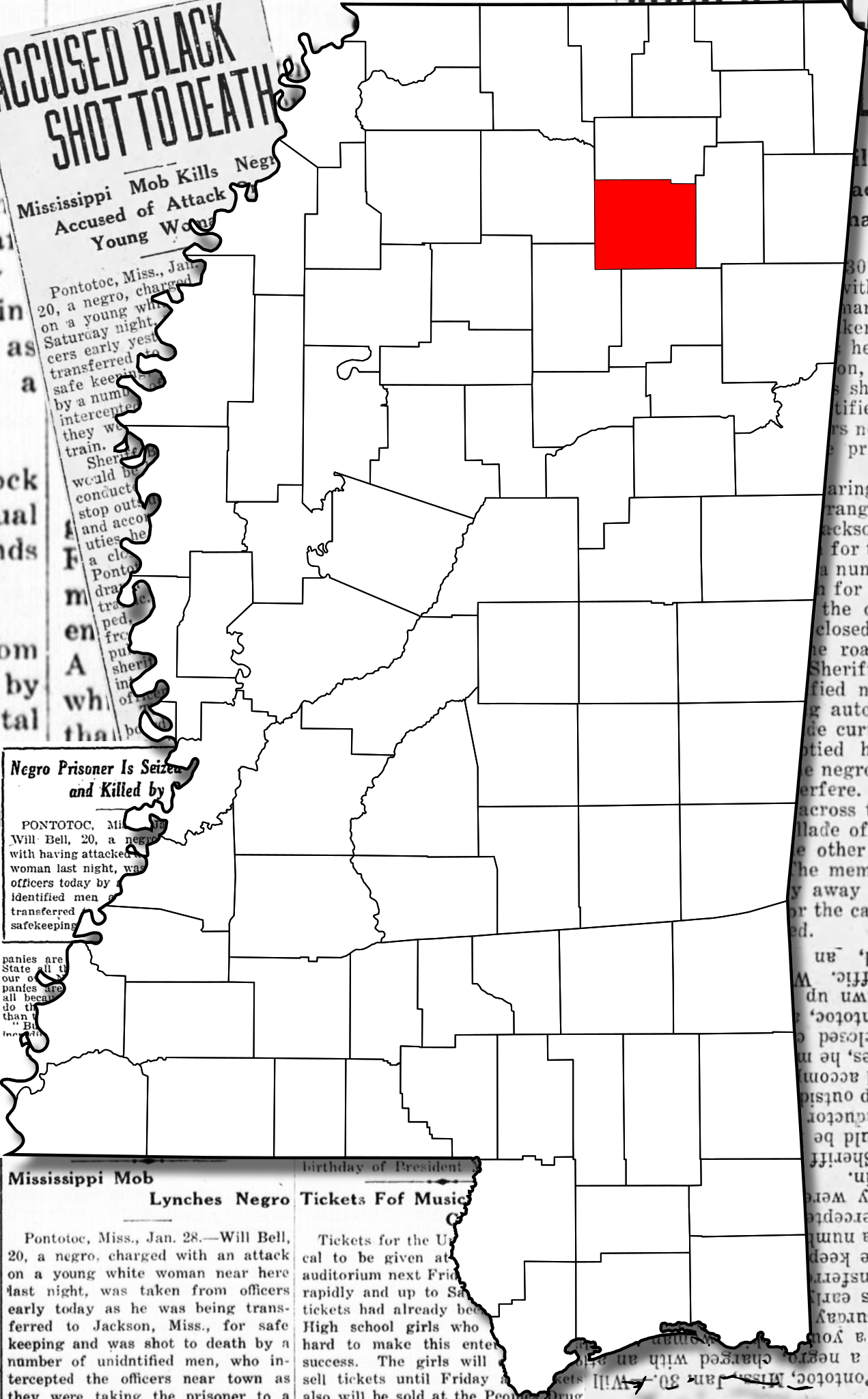
- News coverage of the Lynching of Will Bell
- Date: January 29, 1922
- Location: Pontotoc County, Mississippi
- Participants: A white mob shoots Will Bell
- Deaths: 1

Will Arthur Bell was lynched by a mob in Pontotoc County, Mississippi as the local sheriff tried to move him to prevent the lynching. According to the United States Senate Committee on the Judiciary it was the 6th of 61 lynchings during 1922 in the United States.

== Alleged attack ==
On Saturday, January 28, 1922, a young white woman was allegedly attacked by a Black man.

== Arrest and lynching ==
Local police arrested 20-year-old Will Bell and Sheriff Blalock feared that he would be lynched before his trial. He made plans to secretly move Will Bell to the capital of Mississippi, Jackson. Early Sunday morning of January 29, 1922, the sheriff and his deputies made a desperate drive to get Bell to the departing night train but their car was stopped by a mob who used another vehicle to stop the police car. A man jumped out, pulled out a revolver and emptied it into Bell. After he dropped dead other members of the mob fired more shots into him.

== Bibliography ==
Notes

References

- The New York Times (January 30, 1922). "Negro Prisoner Is Seized and Killed by Bullets". The New York Times. New York, NY. ISSN 1553-8095. OCLC 1645522.
- Robertson, Campbell (April 25, 2018). "A Lynching Memorial Is Opening. The Country Has Never Seen Anything Like It". The New York Times.
- "Accused Black Shot To Death". Times-Journal. Selma, Alabama: Frazier Titus Raiford. January 30, 1922. OCLC 1080316481.
- "Mississippi Mob Lynches Negro". The Union Daily Times. Union, South Carolina. January 30, 1922. pp. 1–4. ISSN 2471-0563. OCLC 13088988.
- United States Senate Committee on the Judiciary (1926). "To Prevent and Punish the Crime of Lynching: Hearings Before the United States Senate Committee on the Judiciary, Subcommittee on S. 121, Sixty-Ninth Congress, First Session, on Feb. 16, 1926". United States Government Publishing Office.

Number	Name	Date	Place	Method of lynching	Number of victims
1	Bill McAllister	January 8, 1922	Williamsburg, S.C.	Shot	1
2	Lincoln Hickson	January 8, 1922	Williamsburg, S.C.	Shot	1
3	Willie Jenkins	January 10, 1922	Eufaula, Alabama	Shot	1
4	Jake Brooks	January 14, 1922	Oklahoma City, Oklahoma	Hanged	1
5	Charles Strong	January 17, 1922	Mayo, Florida	Hanged	1
6	Will Bell	January 29, 1922	Pontotoc, Mississippi	Shot	1
7	Unidentified	January 29, 1922	Pontotoc, Mississippi	Shot	
8	Drew Conner (White)	January 28, 1922	Bolinger, Alabama	Burned	1
9	Will Thrasher	February 1, 1922	Crystal Springs, Mississippi	Hanged	1
10	Harry Harrison	February 2, 1922	Malvern, Arkansas	Shot	1
11	Manuel Duarte	February 2, 1922	Cameron County, Texas	Shot	1
12	P. Norman	February 11, 1922	Texarkana, Arkansas	Shot	1
13	Will Jones	February 13, 1922	Ellaville, Georgia	Shot	1
14	William Baker	March 8, 1922	Aberdeen, Mississippi	Hanged	1
15	Alfred Williams	March 12, 1922	Harlem, Georgia	Hanged	1
16	Brown Culpepper (White)	March 13, 1922	Holly Grove, Louisiana	Shot	1
17	Jerry Ingram	March 17, 1922	Crawford, Mississippi	Shot	1
18	Unidentified (white)	March 19, 1922	Okay, Oklahoma	Drowned	1
19	Alexander Smith	March 22, 1922	Gulfport, Mississippi	Hanged	1
20	Snap Curry	May 6, 1922	Kirvin, Texas	Burned	1
21	H. Varney (or Johnnie Cornish)	May 6, 1922	Kirvin, Texas	Burned	1
22	Mose Jones	May 6, 1922	Kirvin, Texas	Burned	1
23	Tom Cornish	May 8, 1922	Kirvin, Texas	Hanged	1
24	Thomas Early	May 17, 1922	Conroe, Texas	Burned	1
25	Charles Atkins	May 18, 1922	Davisboro, Georgia	Burned	1
26	Hullen Owens	May 19, 1922	Texarkana, Texas	Hanged (body burned)	1
27	Joe Winters	May 20, 1922	Conroe, Texas	Burned	1
28	Mose Bozier	May 20, 1922	Alleyton, Texas	Hanged	1
29	Gilbert Wilson	May 23, 1922	Bryan, Texas	Beaten to death	1
30	Jesse Thomas	May 26, 1922	Waco, Texas	Shot (body burned)	1
31	William Byrd	May 28, 1922	Brentwood, Georgia	Shot (body burned)	1
32	Robert Collins	June 20, 1922	Summit, Mississippi	Hanged	1
33	Warren Lewis	June 23, 1922	New Dacus, Texas	Hanged	1
34	James Harvey	July 1, 1922	Lanes Bridge, Georgia	Hanged	1
35	Joe Jordan	July 1, 1922	Lanes Bridge, Georgia	Hanged	1
36	Philip Tankard	July 5, 1922	Belhaven, North Carolina	Shot	1
37	Joe Pemberton	July 7, 1922	Benton, Louisiana	Hanged	1
38	Jake "Shake" Davis	July 14, 1922	Miller County, Georgia	Hanged	1
39	Oscar Mack	July 18, 1922	Orange County, Florida	Hanged (False report, Oscar Mack survived)	1
40	Will Anderson	July 24, 1922	Allentown, Georgia	Shot	1
41	John West	July 28, 1922	Guernsey, Arkansas	Shot	1
42	Gilbert Harris	August 1, 1922	Hot Springs, Arkansas	Hanged	1
43	John Glover	August 1, 1922	Holton,	Shot	1
44	Bayner Blackwell	August 6, 1922	Swansboro, North Carolina	Shot	1
45	John Steelman	August 23, 1922	Lambert, Mississippi	Burned	1
46	Thomas Rivers	August 30, 1922	Bossier Parish, Louisiana	Hanged	1
47	F. Watt Daniels (White)	August 1922	Mer Rouge, Louisiana	Ku-Klux Klan	1
48	Thomas F. Richards (White)	August 1922	Mer Rouge, Louisiana	Ku-Klux Klan	1
49	Jim Reed Long	September 2, 1922	Winder, Georgia	Ku-Klux Klan	1
50	O.J. Johnson	September 7, 1922	Newton, Texas	Hanged	1
51	Jim Johnston	September 28, 1922	Sandersville, Georgia	Hanged	1
52	Grover C. Everett	September 28, 1922	Abilene, Texas	Shot	1
53	John Brown	October 3, 1922	Montgomery, Alabama	Shot	1
54	Ed Hartley (white)	October 20, 1922	Camden, Tennessee	Shot	1
55	George Hartley (white)	October 20, 1922	Camden, Tennessee	Shot	1
56	Elias V. Zarate	November 11, 1922	Weslaco, Texas	Shot	1
57	Cupid Dickson / Cubrit Dixon	December 5, 1922	Madison, Florida	Shot	1
58	Charles Wright	December 8 ,1922	Perry, Florida	Burned	1
59	Less Smith	December 9, 1922	Morrilton, Arkansas	Burned	1
60	George Gay	December 11, 1922	Streetman, Texas	Hanged	1
61	Arthur Young	December 11, 1922	Perry, Florida	Hanged	1
