= 1968 Chicago riots =

Rioting and looting event (April 5–7)

1968 Chicago Riots
- Part of the King assassination riots
- Date: April 5–7, 1968
- Location: Chicago, Illinois, United States; 41°52′N 87°44′W
- Caused by: Assassination of Martin Luther King, Jr.
- Methods: Rioting, race riots, protests, looting, attacks

Parties
United States government; 1st Armored Division; 5th Infantry Division; Government of Illinois; Illinois Army National Guard; City of Chicago; Chicago Police Department	Rioters, protesters

Casualties
- Deaths: 11
- Injuries: 500
- Arrested: 2,150+

The 1968 Chicago riots, in the United States, were sparked in part by the assassination of Martin Luther King Jr. on April 4, 1968. Rioting and looting followed, with people flooding out onto the streets of major cities, primarily in black urban areas. Over 100 major U.S. cities suffered such disturbances, resulting in roughly $50 million in damage.

King had led a march for open housing in Chicago; whites responded violently. He said, "I've been in many demonstrations all across the South, but I can say that I have never seen, even in Mississippi and Alabama, mobs as hostile and as hate-filled as I'm seeing in Chicago." The riots after his death were particularly aggressive by both rioters and police, resulting in severe damage. Of the 39 people who died in the nationwide disturbances, 34 were black.

Chicago, Baltimore, and Washington, D.C. underwent some of the worst riots following King's assassination. In Chicago itself, more than 48 hours of rioting left 11 Chicago citizens dead, 48 wounded by police gunfire, 90 policemen injured, and 2,150 people arrested. Three miles of East Garfield Park and West Garfield Park on West Madison Street were left in a state of rubble.

Later the same year, around the Democratic National Convention, Chicago would once again be a place for political protest and clashes with the authorities.

== Events ==
=== April 5 ===
On April 5, 1968, violence sparked on the West side of Chicago, gradually expanding to consume a 28-block stretch of West Madison Street and leading to additional damage on Roosevelt Road. The Austin and Lawndale neighborhoods on the West Side, and the Woodlawn neighborhood on the South Side experienced the majority of the destruction and chaos. The rioters broke windows, looted stores, and set buildings (both abandoned and occupied) on fire. Firefighters quickly flooded the neighborhood, and Chicago's off-duty firefighters were told to report to work. There were 36 major fires reported between 4:00 pm and 10:00 pm alone. The next day, Mayor Richard J. Daley imposed a curfew on anyone under the age of 21, closed the streets to automobile traffic, and halted the sale of guns or ammunition.

=== April 6 ===
Approximately 10,500 police were sent in, and by April 6, more than 6,700 Illinois National Guard troops had arrived in Chicago with 5,000 soldiers from the 1st Armored and 5th Infantry Divisions being ordered into the city by President Johnson. The general in charge declared that no one was allowed to have gatherings in the riot areas and authorized the use of tear gas. Mayor Richard J. Daley gave police the authority "to shoot to kill any arsonist or anyone with a Molotov cocktail in his hand ... and ... to shoot, to maim, or cripple anyone looting any stores in our city."

The South Side had escaped the major chaos mainly because the two large street gangs, the Blackstone Rangers and the East Side Disciples, cooperated to control their neighborhoods. Many gang members did not participate in the rioting, due in part to King's direct involvement with these groups in 1966.

== Aftermath ==
Film shot by Daspo Conus on April 9, 1968, of Chicago after the riots

Federal troops were requested to restore order, and the President invoked the Insurrection Act of 1807 on April 7.

=== Rumors and investigation ===
Rumors circulated that the riots had been organized by Black Panther activists and on April 10, a Chicago Tribune editorial claimed that "Black Power groups" had been the driving force behind the violence through a "conspiracy to riot." No evidence was produced to support the argument that it was a planned riot. During the summer of 1968, Mayor Richard J. Daley appointed the Chicago Riot Study Committee. The committee was led by judges, business leaders, lawyers, and politicians, and staffed by volunteers from law offices. The Committee interviewed hundreds of black residents and white business owners in the area, as well as police officers, fire fighters, and local activists, but no evidence of a conspiracy was produced. The final Riot Study concluded, "Some of the rioters may have discussed specific acts of violence, but for the majority of blacks, the riot was a spontaneous overflow of pent-up aggressions." The Committee also concluded that the majority of first rioters were high school students who began taking their frustration out on white business owners. Once the riots started, however, witnesses said that the riots expanded and multiple adults joined the teenage rioters. No evidence was found that concluded anyone intentionally set fire to a black-owned business or residence.

=== Damages and shortages ===
The riots resulted in over 125 fires and 210 buildings being damaged, totaling $10 million worth of damages. Power lines and telephone lines all around the city were knocked out. In the first two days of rioting, police reported multiple civilian deaths but were unable to determine whether they were caused by the riots or other crimes. No official death toll was given for the riots, although published accounts say 9 to 11 people died as a result. Over 2,000 people were arrested, and a thousand people were left homeless. The destruction was mostly on the west side. However, there was some damage on the south side, the near north side and as far north as Old Town.

Following the riots, Chicago experienced a food shortage, and the city's needs were barely met by volunteers bringing food to the area. Results of the riots include the increase in pace of the area's ongoing deindustrialization and public and private disinvestment. Bulldozers moved in to clean up after the rioters, leaving behind vacant lots, some rebuilt but many of which remain today.

== See also ==
- List of incidents of civil unrest in the United States
