= Alice Clement =

American police officer

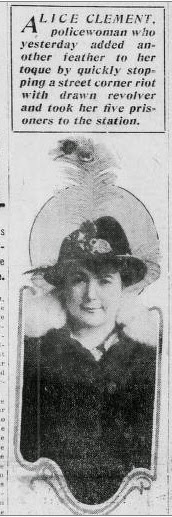
- Alice Clement in the Chicago examiner in 1915
- Born: Alice Bush; 1878; Milwaukee
- Died: 1926 (age 49)
- Resting place: Bronswood Cemetery Oak Brook, DuPage County, Illinois, USA
- Years active: 1909 - 1926

Alice Clement (1878–1926) was a detective with the Chicago police department. She was the first female police detective in Chicago.

== Personal life ==
Clement was born Alice Bush in Milwaukee, Wisconsin in 1878. In 1895 she married Leonard Clement, she eventually divorced him in 1914 on the grounds of "desertion and intemperance". In 1918 she married a barber named Albert Faubel.

== Career ==
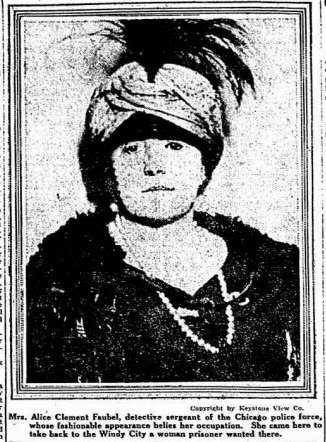
An article about Alice Clement. (Image isn't of Alice Clement, but of a prisoner Clement took back to Chicago)

Clement began working for the Chicago Police Department in 1909, patrolling department stores in search of pickpockets. In 1913, she became a detective, and soon after she was talked about in several newspapers such as the Chicago Tribune and Variety. On May 21, 1922 she appeared in the New York Evening Telegram. In 1919, Clement wrote, produced, and starred in a movie called Dregs of the City, where she played as herself.

One of her most famous cases was "The Dulcimer", which involved the murder of a young woman who was most likely a prostitute gravely ill with typhoid. The male detectives on the force assumed that she'd simply succumbed to her "lifestyle" but Clement remained unconvinced. Further investigation revealed that the woman had, in fact, acquired typhoid as part of a murder plot.

== Sickness and death ==
In mid-1926 Clement was demoted from the detective bureau to the West Chicago police station and was later forced into a medical leave in 1926 due to complications from diabetes, which she had hidden adeptly throughout her entire career. She died the same year the day after Christmas in 1926 at the age of 49.
