= Citizen Law Enforcement Analysis and Reporting =

Citizen Law Enforcement Analysis and Reporting, also known as CLEAR, is a system of relational databases used by the Chicago Police Department (CPD) in Chicago, Illinois. These databases allow law enforcement officials to easily cross-reference available information in investigations and to analyze crime patterns using a geographic information system (GIS). CLEAR includes a network of remotely operated cameras that exhibit a small amount of artificial intelligence, in that they can sense gunshots, loiterers, and suspicious activity, and alert the CPD.

== Uses ==
The unified CLEAR system is used for a wide variety of tasks:

- Checking driver's licenses
- Checking names or addresses
- Checking for outstanding arrest warrants
- Communication between police officers
- Entering evidence into an electronic tracking database
- Retrieving information for a mission
- Checking investigative reports

== Origins ==
In the 1990s, the Chicago Police Department developed the Criminal History Records Information System (CHRIS). This system was immediately unpopular with officers – so much so that a detective's newsletter warned that the IT employees who had developed the system had better "watch out" on the streets. The Police Department soon teamed with Oracle Corporation to create CLEAR, a set of web-based applications to increase the functionality and usability of the CHRIS system. CHRIS remains as a backbone, but CLEAR serves as the user interface.

== Criticisms ==
A number of groups have expressed concerns about CLEAR, particularly regarding privacy and discrimination. Critics have charged that the system uses racial profiling, and that constant electronic monitoring evokes images of a Big Brother–like world.

Some individuals have raised concerns about the cameras used in the CLEAR system. Designed to be visible so as to deter criminal activities, the cameras sit in large checkered boxes with flashing blue lights. Neighbors have complained that these boxes flash light into their bedrooms at night, scare away customers from local businesses, and stigmatize the local community.
