= Jack Muller =

Chicago Police Detective

- Born: May 15, 1923; Chicago, Illinois, USA
- Died: March 11, 2005 (aged 81); Evanston, Illinois, USA
- Occupation: Detective for the Chicago Police Department
- Spouse: Janet Kasten Muller
- Children: Kurt Muller

Jack Muller (1923-2005) was a Chicago Police Detective.

== History ==
=== Early life ===
Muller was born in Chicago, Illinois to Hungarian and Polish immigrants. He attended Marshall High School, then the University of Michigan on a football scholarship. He dropped out of university to enlist in the U.S. Navy and spent World War II serving in the Pacific theatre aboard the USS Sheldrake as a mine sweeping specialist. On January 18, 1946 Muller received a hardship discharge and returned home to help care for his dying father. Four weeks later, he took the Chicago Police exam and passed.

As a police officer, Jack gained notoriety for his "prodigious ticket writing". The first parking ticket Jack wrote was for an illegally parked car on Argyle Street; as he was tucking the ticket under the wiper blade, the man who owned the car ran up and tried to persuade him to tear it up. He was a small political figure in the city, and when the court case came up, the judge threw it out. This incident had a profound impact on Muller and set the stage for fighting with corrupt city officials for the rest of his career.

In 1953 Muller was assigned traffic duty on Rush Street, a narrow night club–lined street. There was never enough parking, and keeping the lanes open and cars moving was a big job. He soon became a familiar sight, patrolling the street on his motorcycle. On August 7, 1954, Muller observed a Cadillac going east down the westbound lane of Oak Street. The car was driven by the wife of chief judge of the Superior Court of Cook County Samuel B. Epstein, and the judge was in the passenger seat. Eyewitnesses reported that as the officer was taking his ticket book out of his pocket, the judge's wife jumped out of the car, slapping his face and kicking him in the shin. The judge got out and ran around the car and jumped on Muller's back. After he had the couple under control and called for backup, the judge's wife said she had been hit by the officer and wanted to go to the hospital. The judge was taken into the station, where he received a $6 traffic fine and was sent away. The next day, as a reprimand, Muller lost his two-wheel motorcycle and was issued a three-wheeler instead. Muller made no secret of the fact he didn't like the three-wheeler, and many of the Rush Street crowd started calling it "the Mullercycle". Jack Muller was starting to become famous for ticketing anyone that deserved it, politicians, celebrities; no one was immune. Jack arrested Cubs broadcaster Jack Brickhouse, towed the car of Illinois Governor William Stratton and ticketed Chicago Mayor Richard J. Daley. On October 24, 1955, Life Magazine reported that Officer Muller wrote 15,000 traffic tickets a year.

In October 1967, while assigned to an auto theft unit of the Chicago Police, Muller discovered that other officers were selling tires that had been seized in police raids. He reported his findings to his commander, who in turn relayed the report to the Commander of the Auto Theft Division. Five days later, after seeing there was no further investigation, Muller submitted his charges to the Superintendent of the Chicago Police. Three weeks later, Muller was interviewed on television concerning his charges, where he told of the corruption within the Department. When asked by the reporter why Muller hadn't made his complaints to the Internal Investigation Unit, he replied, "The IID is like a big washing machine, all the dirty cops that go in, come out clean."
