= Chicago Police Department =

Principal law enforcement agency of Chicago, Illinois, US

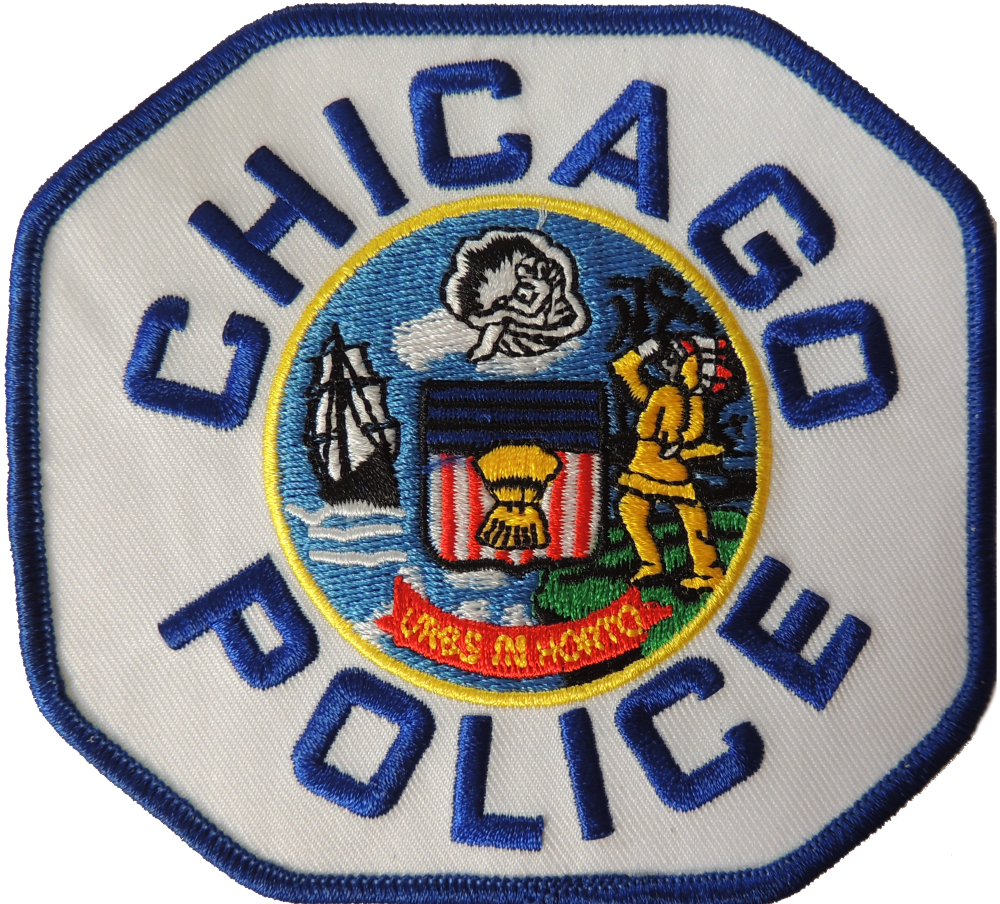
- Patch

- Seal

- Badge
- Common name: Chicago P.D.
- Abbreviation: CPD
- Motto: We Serve and Protect

Agency overview
- Formed: December 20, 1835; 190 years ago
- Employees: 13,086 (2020)
- Annual budget: $1.7 billion (2020)

Jurisdictional structure
- Operations jurisdiction: Chicago, Illinois, U.S.
- Jurisdictional area
- Area: 237 sq mi (610 km^{2})
- Population: 2,746,388 (2020)
- Legal jurisdiction: As per operations jurisdiction
- Governing body: Chicago City Council
- General nature: Local civilian police

Operational structure
- Headquarters: 3510 S. Michigan Ave; Chicago, Illinois, U.S.
- Police officers: ▼12,000 of 13,500 (2025)
- Civilian employees: 948 (2020)
- Mayor of Chicago responsible: Brandon Johnson
- Agency executive: Larry Snelling, Superintendent
- Bureaus: 6: Bureau of Patrol; Bureau of Detectives; Bureau of Organized Crime; Bureau of Organizational Development; Bureau of Technical Services; Bureau of Internal Affairs

Facilities
- Districts: 22: 001: Central; 002: Wentworth; 003: Grand Crossing; 004: South Chicago; 005: Calumet; 006: Gresham; 007: Englewood; 008: Chicago Lawn; 009: Deering; 010: Ogden; 011: Harrison; 012: Near West; 014: Shakespeare; 015: Austin; 016: Jefferson Park; 017: Albany Park; 018: Near North; 019: Town Hall; 020: Lincoln; 022: Morgan Park; 024: Rogers Park; 025: Grand Central

Website
- chicagopolice.org

The Chicago Police Department (CPD) is the primary law enforcement agency of the city of Chicago, Illinois, United States, under the jurisdiction of the Chicago City Council. It is the second-largest municipal police department in the United States, behind the New York City Police Department. As of 2025, the CPD had 11,554 sworn officers on duty, and has 124 units. Tracing its roots to 1835, the Chicago Police Department is one of the oldest modern police departments in the world.

== Department structure ==
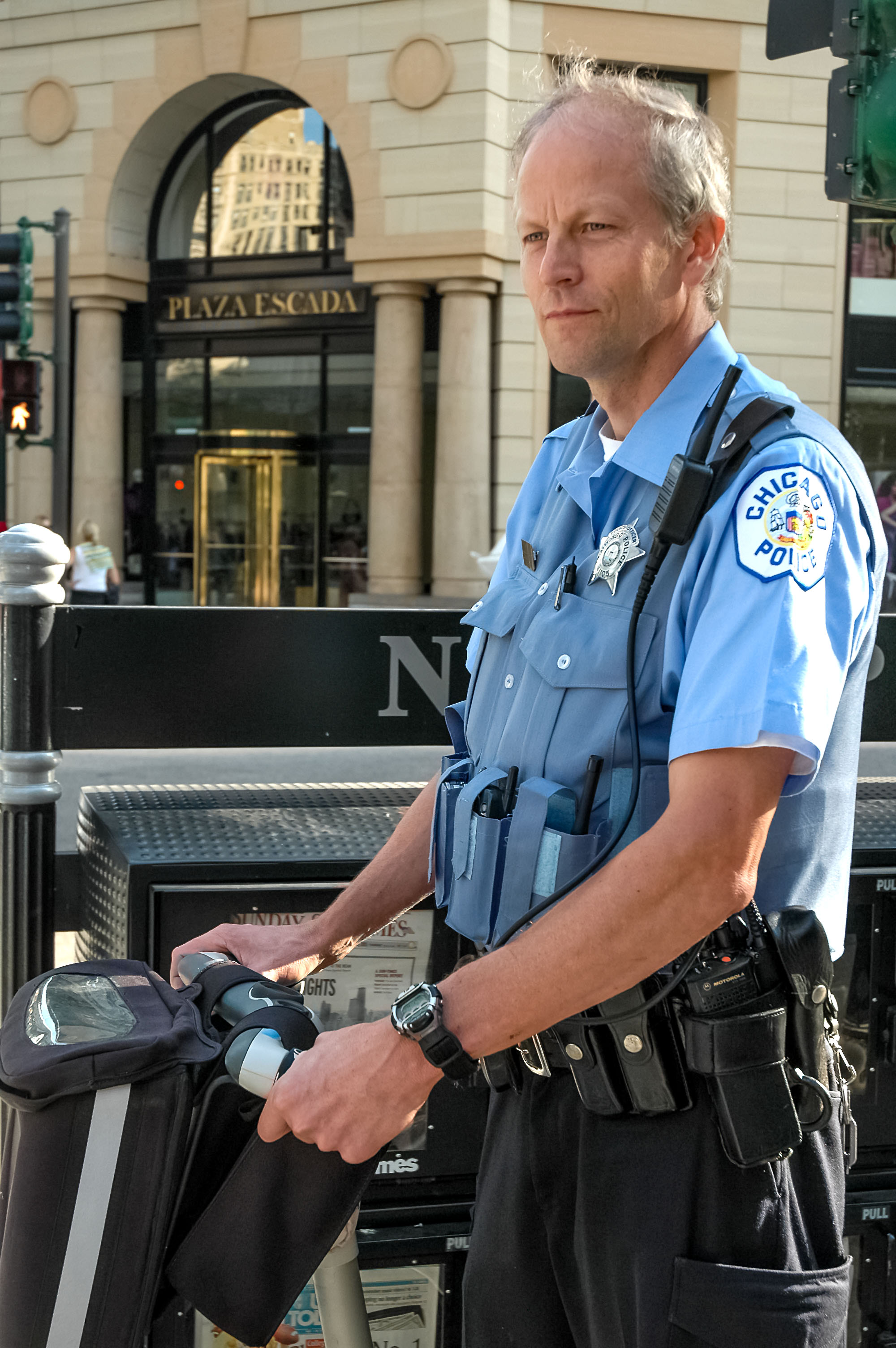
Chicago police officer

=== Office of the Superintendent ===
The Superintendent of Police leads the Chicago Police Department.

In 1960, the municipal government created a five-member police board charged with nominating a superintendent to be the chief authority over police officers, drafting and adopting rules and regulations governing the police system, submitting budget requests to the city council, and hearing and deciding disciplinary cases involving police officers. Criminologist O. W. Wilson was brought on as Superintendent of Police, and served until 1967 when he retired. This position, in its current iteration, has existed as the head of the Chicago Police Department since 1960.

=== Salary ===
Starting salary for Chicago police officers in 2025 is $61,782, which is increased to $93,186 after 18 months. Promotions to specialized or command positions also increase an officer's base pay. Salaries were supplemented with a $2,920 annual duty availability and an $1,800 annual uniform allowance.

=== Demographics ===
In 2017, the composition of the department's sworn personnel by gender was 77% male and 23% female. The highest ranked woman in Chicago police history was Barbara West, who was appointed to the department's third-highest rank (the deputy superintendent) in 2020.

In 2017, the racial composition of the department's sworn personnel was:

- 50% non-Hispanic White
- 25% Hispanic (of any race)
- 21% African American
- 3% Asian American/Pacific Islander
- 1% other

=== Union ===
The Chicago Police Department became unionized at the end of 1980. Chicago police officers are represented by the Fraternal Order of Police. In 2020, Officer John Catanzara was elected as the head of the union. Catanzara has faced multiple complaints throughout his career and has made controversial remarks about Muslims and the January 6th Capitol Attack.

== Oversight ==
Five government agencies are charged with various aspects of police oversight in Chicago: a set of 22 Police District Councils, the Community Commission for Public Safety and Accountability, the Chicago Police Board, the Civilian Office of Police Accountability, and the Deputy Inspector General for Public Safety. Most of these bodies were created by ordinances passed in 2016 and 2021, and their membership is determined through a mix of appointments by the Mayor of Chicago, confirmations by the Chicago City Council, and elections.

== History ==
According to historian Sam Mitrani, the Chicago Police Department professionalized and grew in size during the 19th century in order to quell labor unrest. City policymakers cooperated with business elites in terms of structuring the police department. The Chicago Police Department remained beset by vast corruption well into the 20th century.

=== 19th century ===
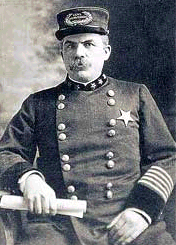
Chicago Police Chief Francis O'Neill 1901–1905

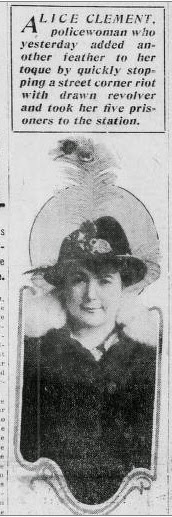
CPD Detective Alice Clement 1915

In 1825, prior to the creation of Cook County, what would later become the village of Chicago was then located in Putnam County. Archibald Clybourn was appointed to be Constable of the area between the DuPage River and Lake Michigan. Clybourn went on to become an important citizen of the city, and the diagonal Clybourn Avenue is named after him.

Chicago was given authorization to establish a police force on January 31, 1835, and it was formally established on August 15, with Orsemus Morrison as its first constable. The Municipal Court of Chicago was created in 1837. The title of the leader of the department, Head Constable, was changed to City Marshall in 1841, with Orson Smith being the first to hold it.

Cyrus P. Bradley, who was appointed chief of police on May 26, 1855, reorganized the department in 1855, with the day and night watches being combined and its size increasing by sixfold. Chicago was divided into three police divisions and districts. Uniforms were instituted in 1858, as prior to this officers wore plain clothes. In 1855, the newly elected city council passed ordinances to formally establish the Chicago Police Department. Chicago was divided into three police precincts, each served by a station house. Station No. 1 was located in a building on State Street between Lake and Randolph streets. Station No. 2 was on West Randolph Street near Des Plaines Street. Station No. 3 was on Michigan Street (since then renamed Hubbard Street) near Clark Street. Political connections were important to joining the force; formal requirements were few, until 1895. After 1856, the department hired many foreign-born recruits, especially unskilled, but English-speaking, Irish immigrants.

There were 67 total police officers in 1860, compared to the over 100,000 inhabitants of Chicago. In 1860, the detective forces were established. In 1861, the state legislature created the Chicago Police Commission (abolished in 1875). Mayor John Wentworth, an opponent of the state's control over the police, fired the city's entire police force on March 27, 1861. Most of these men were rehired by the police board within a few hours.

James L. Shelton became the department's first black officer in 1871. In 1875, the Illinois General Assembly found that the police commissioners were unable to control rampant corruption within the Chicago Police Department. The legislature passed a new law returning power over the police to the mayor. The mayor was allowed to appoint a single police commissioner with the advice and consent of the city council.

In 1896, a parade of Chicago police officers was the subject of the first film ever to be shot in Chicago.

Women entered the force in 1885, as matrons, caring for female prisoners. Marie Owens is believed to have been the first female police officer in the U.S., joining the Chicago Police Department in 1891, retiring in 1923. Holding the rank of Sergeant, Owens enforced child labor and welfare laws.

Despite centralized policies and practices, the captains who ran the precincts or districts were relatively independent of headquarters, owing their jobs to neighborhood politicians. Decentralization meant that police could respond to local concerns, but graft often determined which concerns got the most attention. In 1895, Chicago adopted civil service procedures, and written tests became the basis for hiring and promotion. Standards for recruits rose, though policing remained political.

=== 20th century ===
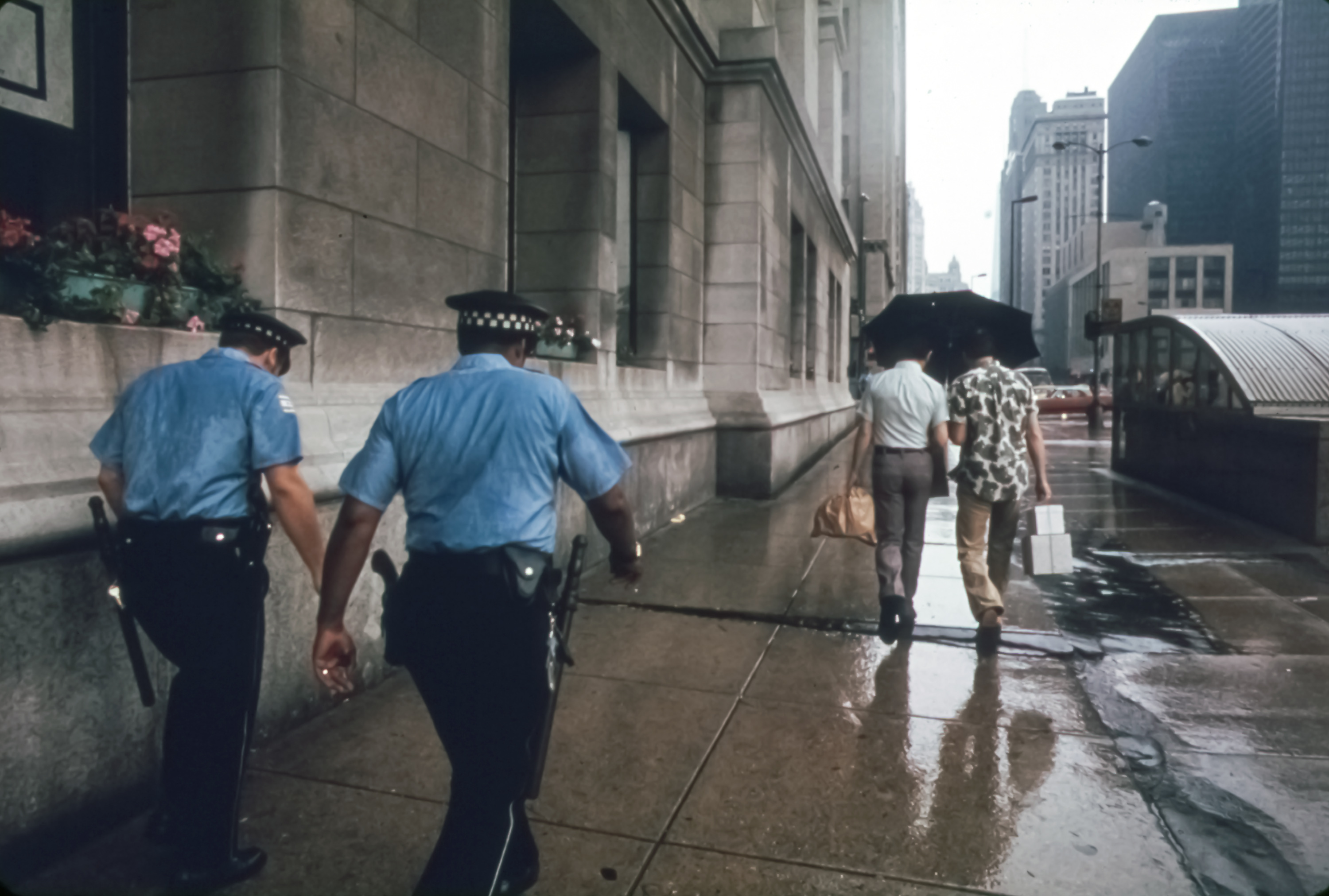
Chicago Police in the rain in 1973 on Michigan Avenue

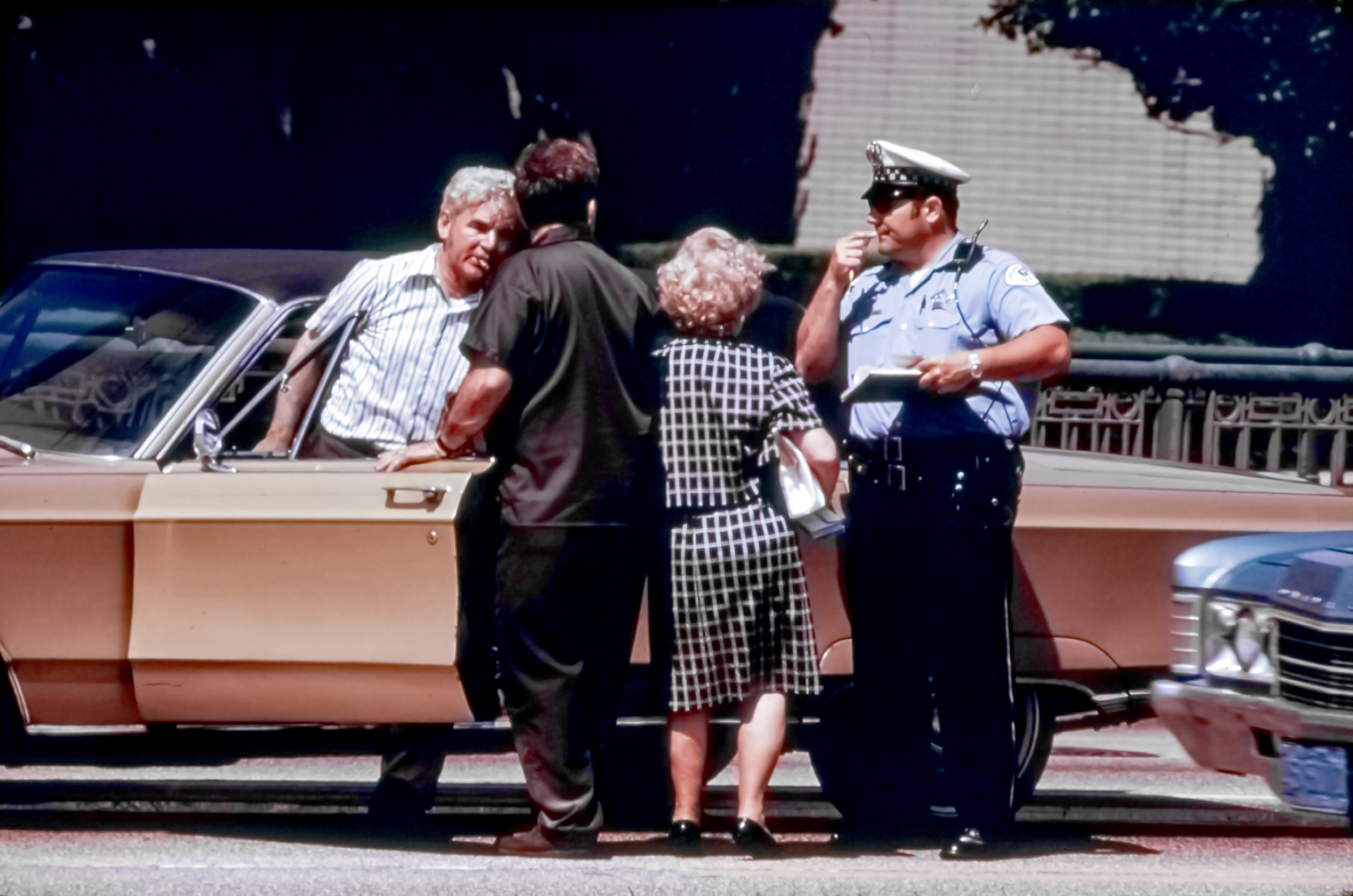
Chicago Police officer in 1973 inquiring about a traffic accident

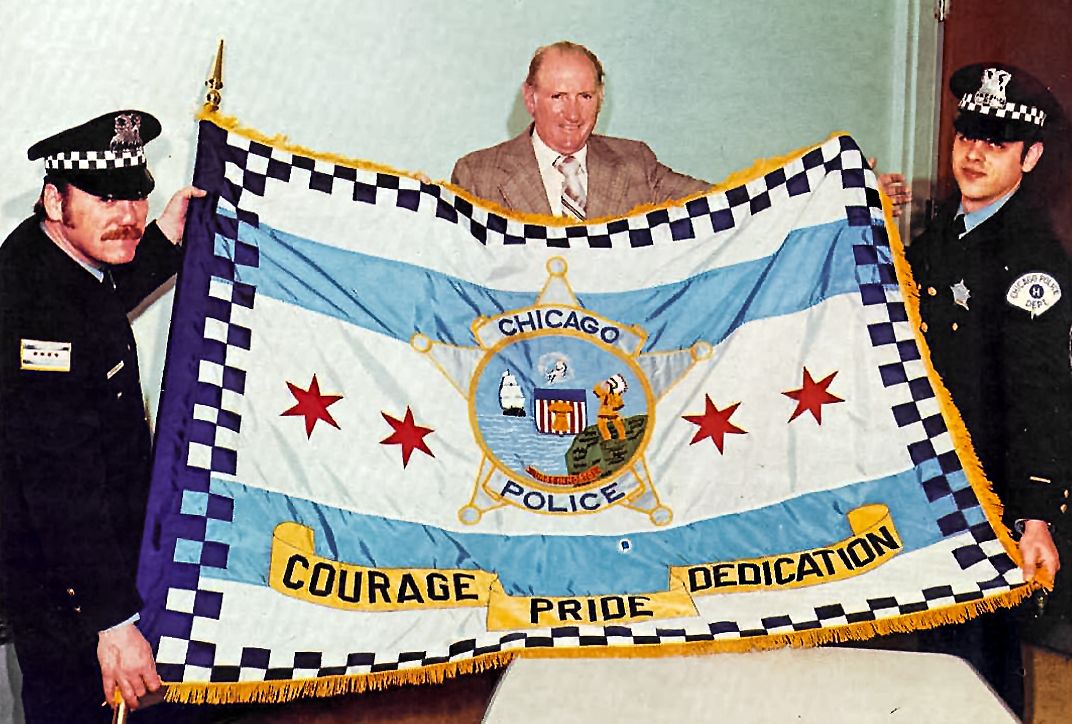
CPD policemen unveiling the flag of the Chicago PD in 1977

In 1906, the Department's Mounted Patrol was created to provide crowd control, and in 1908, the force was granted its first three motor cars, expanding in 1910 to motorbikes and boats. Female officers were formally appointed beginning on August 13, 1913, starting with ten officers that included Alice Clement. In 1918, Grace Wilson, possibly the first black female police officer in United States history, joined the force. In 1913, Clement became the first female police detective for the Chicago Police Department.

In 1917, the Chicago Police Reserves were formed, organized on a regimental basis. They were used to assist or replace regular officers in high-crowd events, such as Memorial Day, and during the 1918 flu pandemic, worked for two weeks to enforce stringent health regulations.

The Saint Valentine's Day Massacre led to the creation of the United States' first crime laboratory at Northwestern University, purchased by the Department in 1938.

Orlando W. Wilson, the first civilian superintendent, was appointed by the mayor in 1960. A former dean of criminology, Wilson introduced major reforms to the Department, including a new and innovative communications center, the reduction of police stations, a fairer promotion process, and an emphasis on motorized patrol over foot patrol. Vehicles were painted blue and white and given blue lightbars, introducing the familiar Sillitoe tartan headbands, and the official motto, 'We Serve And Protect'. In 1963, the Cadet Program was also introduced.

The 1968 Democratic National Convention in Grant Park led to major criticism of the Chicago Police's crowd control methods, with the Walker Report criticizing both the Department and the National Guard for use of excessive force, and called the events a police riot.

The Department's Mounted Patrol was disbanded in 1948. The Department's Mounted Patrol was re-established in 1974, renamed simply as the Mounted Unit.

In April 1977, the CPD adopted a flag.

In August 1983, the Chicago Police Department's first black superintendent, Fred Rice Jr., was appointed by Mayor Harold Washington, the city's first black mayor. The first Hispanic superintendent, Matt L. Rodriguez, was appointed by Mayor Richard M. Daley in 1992.

In 1993, the Chicago Alternative Policing Strategy (CAPS) was first rolled out, expanding to all areas by 1995.

=== 21st century ===
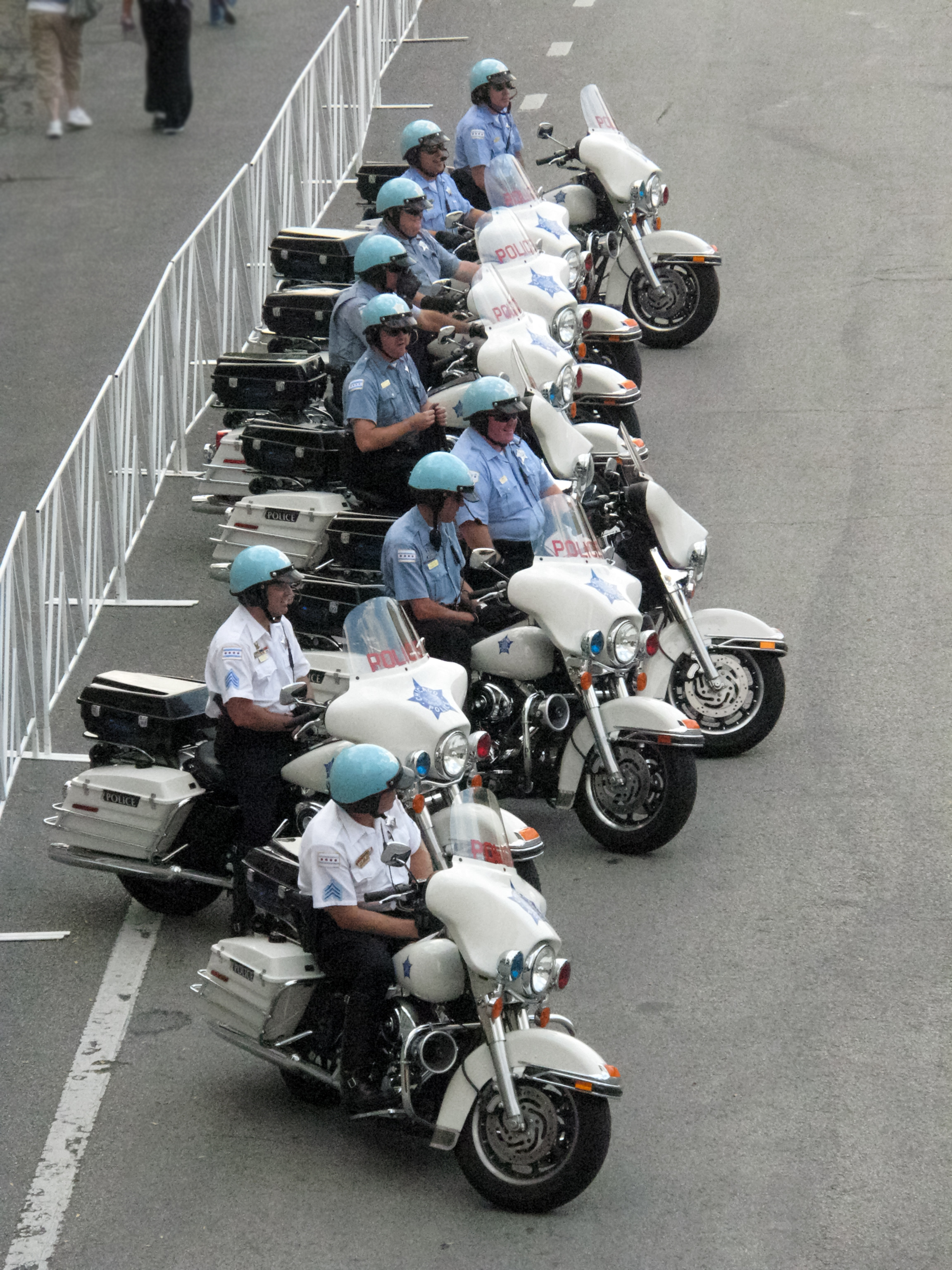
Chicago Police 2007

The new Chicago Police Department Headquarters was opened on June 3, 2000, replacing an extremely aged and outdated building located at 1121 South State Street.

In 2018, the Chicago PD began a “narcotics arrest diversion program” to help individuals without violent crime records who are habitual narcotic users. Working with Chicago-based Thresholds, an addiction recovery agency, the police give those suffering from substance abuse disorder one final chance: If they enter the program, charges against them are dropped. In 2020, three African Americans, David Brown, Eric Carter and Barbara West, were appointed to the Chicago PD's three highest ranking positions, marking the first time in history that the department's Superintendent, 1st Deputy Superintendent and Deputy Superintendent were African American.

In 2021, during the COVID-19 pandemic, the largest union for the CPD compared vaccine requirements for police to the Holocaust. The union head encouraged CPD officers not to get vaccinated.

In August 2022, the number of sworn officers was 11,611, which was down 1,742 officers from its peak four years prior.

==== 2017 Department of Justice report and agreement for enforcement ====
Following the McDonald shooting, Illinois attorney general Lisa Madigan requested that the Department of Justice (DOJ) conduct a civil rights investigation of the department. The agency released a report in January 2017, announcing an agreement with the city to work on improvements under court supervision. The report strongly criticized the police for a culture of excessive violence, especially against minority suspects and the community, and said that there was insufficient and poor training and a lack of true oversight.

The lack of training was one of the main targets of the DOJ report. The DOJ criticized the department for "check the box" training that relied heavily on PowerPoint presentations and included poorly executed training exercises in the field. The DOJ also observed recruits falling asleep during training.

In the aftermath of the investigation, Chicago mayor Rahm Emanuel approved the construction of a new training facility for the police and fire departments. The new building cost an estimated $95 million.

== Controversies ==
The Chicago Police Department has a history of scandals, police misconduct, corruption, police brutality, and other controversies. Since 2019, the CPD has been subject to a consent decree requiring the department to enact reforms in discipline, supervision, training and recruiting of its police officers. This was in the wake of a 2017 Department of Justice report which found that the CPD had a history of civil rights violations by officers, including a "pattern and practice" of police brutality and abuse.

=== Summerdale scandals ===
The Chicago Police Department did not face large-scale reorganization efforts until 1960 under Mayor Richard J. Daley. That year, eight officers from the Summerdale police district on Chicago's North Side were accused of operating a large-scale burglary ring. The Summerdale case dominated the local press, and became the biggest police-related scandal in the city's history at the time. Mayor Daley appointed a committee to make recommendations for improvements to the police department. The action resulted in the creation of a five-member board charged with nominating a superintendent to be the chief authority over police officers, enacting rules and regulations governing the police system, submitting budget requests to the city council, and overseeing disciplinary cases involving officers. Criminologist O.W. Wilson was brought on as Superintendent of Police, and served until 1967 when he retired.

=== 1968 Democratic National Convention ===
Film shot by DASPO of the protests and Chicago police and military response to the protests

Both Daley and the Chicago Police Department faced a great deal of criticism for the department's actions during the 1968 Democratic National Convention, which was held in Chicago from August 26 to 29, 1968.

The convention was the site of a series of protests, mainly over the war in Vietnam. Despite the poor behavior of some protesters, there was widespread criticism that the Chicago Police and National Guard used excessive force. Time published an article stating:

With billy clubs, tear gas and Mace, the blue-shirted, blue-helmeted cops violated the civil rights of countless innocent citizens and contravened every accepted code of professional police discipline. No one could accuse the Chicago cops of discrimination. They savagely attacked hippies, yippies, New Leftists, revolutionaries, dissident Democrats, newsmen, photographers, passers-by, clergymen and at least one handicapped. Winston Churchill's journalist grandson got roughed up. Even Dan Rather (the future CBS News anchor) who was on the floor doing a report during the convention got roughed up by the Chicago Police Department. Playboy's Hugh Hefner took a whack on the backside. The police even victimized a member of the British Parliament, Mrs. Anne Kerr, a vacationing Laborite who was maced outside the Conrad Hilton and hustled off to the lockup.

Subsequently, the Walker Report to the U.S. National Commission on the Causes and Prevention of Violence called the police response a "police riot", assigning blame for the mayhem in the streets to the Chicago Police.

Nevertheless, "[p]olls taken immediately after the convention showed that the majority of Americans – 56 percent – sympathized with the police, not with the bloodied demonstrators or the press." A poll taken for The New York Times "showed an 'overwhelming' majority respondents supported the police in Chicago." CBS reported that 10 times as many people had written to them disapproving of their coverage of the events as had written in approval.

=== The Black Panther raid ===
On December 4, 1969, Black Panther Party leaders Fred Hampton and Mark Clark were shot and killed by officers working for the Cook County state's attorney, Edward Hanrahan. Though the police claimed they had been attacked by heavily armed Panthers, a subsequent investigation showed that all but one of the bullets fired came from police weapons. Relatives of the two dead men eventually won a multimillion-dollar judgment against the city. For many African Americans, the incident symbolized prejudice and lack of restraint among the largely white police. The incident led to growing black voter disaffection with the Democratic machine.

=== Ryan Harris murder ===
On July 28, 1998, an 11-year-old girl, Ryan Harris, was found raped and murdered in a vacant lot in the city's Englewood neighborhood. The homicide caught the nation's attention when, 12 days after Ryan's body was found, authorities, with the blessing of police command, charged a 7-year-old boy and 8-year-old boy with the murder, making them the youngest murder suspects in the nation at the time. Semen found at the scene and subsequent DNA tests totally cleared the boys of the crime and pointed to convicted sex offender Floyd Durr. The boys each filed lawsuits against the city, which were eventually settled for millions of dollars. Durr, who had already been serving a 125 year sentence for other sex-related crimes, pleaded guilty to the rape of Harris as part of a plea deal and was sentenced to life in prison with an additional 30 years.

=== Russ/Haggerty shootings ===
In the summer of 1999, two unarmed black motorists, Robert Russ and LaTanya Haggerty, were fatally shot in separate incidents involving the Chicago Police. In the first incident, Russ, an honor student and star football player for Northwestern University, was shot in his car. This followed a high-speed chase and what the police claim was a struggle with the officer who shot him. In the second, Haggarty, a computer analyst, was shot by a female officer. Charges of racism against the CPD persisted. Both shootings resulted in lawsuits and Haggerty's family reached an $18 million settlement with the city.

In Canadian journalist Malcolm Gladwell's book on the cognitive function of snap judgments, Blink, well-known criminologist and police administrator James Fyfe said that Chicago police instructions in cases such as Russ's were "very detailed". He said that the record shows that the officers involved all broke procedure and let the situation become unnecessarily deadly for the suspect. For instance, after claiming to see Russ drive erratically, the officers engaged in a driving pursuit. The pursuit, labeled "high-speed", did not exceed 70 miles per hour, but Fyfe contends that the adrenaline rush of the chase, coupled with the officers' reliance in their numbers, led to their ignoring impulses to maintain rational thinking in a potentially non-deadly situation. They speeded up a process that both allowed and required taking things more slowly and methodically. Russ's car spun out on the Ryan Expressway, at which point several officers quickly approached his vehicle. According to Gladwell, the false safety of numbers gave the three officers "the bravado to rush the car". Fyfe adds, "The lawyers [for the police] were saying that this was a fast-breaking situation. But it was only fast-breaking because the cops let it become one. He was stopped. He wasn't going anywhere."

Fyfe describes appropriate police procedure and contrasts the events that contributed to Russ's death thus:

[According to police instructions] You are not supposed to approach the car. You are supposed to ask the driver to get out. Well, two of the cops ran up ahead and opened the passenger side door. The other [officer] was on the other side, yelling at Russ to open the door. But Russ just sat there. I don't know what was going through his head. But he didn't respond. So this cop smashe[d] the left rear window of his car and fire[d] a single shot, and it hit Russ in the hand and chest. The cop says that he said, 'Show me your hands, show me your hands,' and he's claiming now that Russ was trying to grab his gun. I don't know if that was the case. I have to accept the cop's claim. But it's beside the point. It's still an unjustified shooting because he shouldn't have been anywhere near the car, and he shouldn't have broken the window.

Gladwell also notes that the Russ and Haggerty killings occurred on the same night.

=== Joseph Miedzianowski ===
In April 2001, Joseph Miedzianowski was convicted of racketeering and drug conspiracy during much of his 22-year career with the department. In January 2003 he was sentenced to life without the possibility of parole. His partner John Galligan and 24 other drug dealers were also arrested as part of the same investigation.

=== William Hanhardt ===
In October 2001, Deputy Superintendent William Hanhardt pled guilty to running a nationwide jewel-theft ring that over twenty years may have stolen five million dollars' worth of diamonds and other gems. He had served with the department for 33 years and was sentenced to twelve years in federal custody.

=== Eddie C. Hicks ===
In December 2001, Sergeant Eddie C. Hicks was indicted for operating a gang with other CPD officers. The group would raid drug houses, taking the contraband for resale. Hicks skipped a court appearance on June 9, 2003, and was placed on the FBI's most-wanted list. Hicks was arrested in Detroit on September 12, 2017, nearly 15 years after he fled on the eve of trial on federal drug conspiracy charges. Hicks, 68, has been the subject of an international manhunt since 2003, according to the FBI. In 2020 he was sentenced to 13 years in federal prison by U.S. District Judge Joan Humphrey Lefkow.

=== Jon Burge torture allegations ===
Since the early 1980s, official investigations have responded to numerous allegations against former Commander Jon Burge, who has been accused of abusing more than two-hundred mostly African-American men from 1972 to 1991 in order to coerce confessions to crimes. Alleged victims claimed that Burge and his crew of detectives had them beaten, suffocated, burned, and treated with electric shock. In 1993, Burge was fired from the department, and collected his police pension until his death in 2018. In summer 2006, special prosecutors completing a four-year investigation concluded that they had enough evidence to prove crimes against Burge and others, but "regrettably" could not bring charges because the statute of limitations had passed. In January 2008, the City Council approved a $19.8 million settlement with four men who claimed abuse by Burge and his men.

In October 2008, Patrick J. Fitzgerald, United States Attorney for the Northern District of Illinois, had Burge arrested on charges of obstruction of justice and perjury in relation to a civil suit regarding the torture allegations against him. Burge was eventually convicted on all counts on June 28, 2010, and was sentenced to four and one-half years in federal prison on January 21, 2011.

On May 6, 2015, Chicago City Council approved "reparations" of $5.5 million to victims of the torture, after spending $100 million in previous legal settlements. In addition, an apology was offered, and a promise to teach school children about these historical events.

According to a 2020 study, torture was used against 125 black suspects (many of whom were found to be innocent) over the years 1972 to 1991. In 2009, the Illinois state government created the Illinois Torture Inquiry and Relief Commission to investigate torture by police.

=== Nurse arrests ===
On November 19, 2002, Rachelle Jackson, a registered nurse, was on her way to work when she witnessed a vehicle accident involving a patrol car, in which Officer Kelly Brogan was dazed and her partner was unconscious. Fearing an explosion, Jackson removed both officers from the vehicle, and voluntarily went to the police station under the assumption of giving a statement after being informed that Brogan's service weapon was stolen. Instead, she was interrogated for two days with little food or sleep and no access to a bathroom. She was coerced into signing a statement that she had battered Brogan and taken her gun. She was jailed for 10 months before the charges were dismissed. Jackson was awarded $7.9 million by a jury in her lawsuit against Brogan and the city. In 2009, the amount was reduced to $1.9 million. More than half the original verdict was awarded for "intentional infliction of emotional distress."

=== Skullcap Crew ===
Skullcap Crew is a nickname given to a group of five Chicago Police officers in a gang tactical unit who have been the subject of abuse complaints by citizens. They have also won praise within the Chicago Police Department. They have been involved in more than 20 federal lawsuits.

=== Bar attack ===
Bartender being punched and kicked by off duty Chicago Police officer Anthony Abbate.

In 2007, security camera footage surfaced of an intoxicated off-duty police officer, Anthony Abbate, punching and kicking a female bartender, Karolina Obrycka. This occurred at Jesse's Shortstop Inn on February 19, 2007, after Obrycka refused to serve him any more alcohol. Abbate was later arrested, charged with felony battery, and stripped of police powers after TV news stations aired the footage. The Chicago Police soon terminated Abbate from the force, but questions remained over the city's handling of the case.

Abbate was allowed to enter his courtroom hearing through a side door, in order to shield himself from the press. This generated controversy, and allegations surfaced that the police ticketed the vehicles of news organizations and threatened reporters with arrest. Superintendent Cline announced that he would demote the Captain who gave the orders, and launched investigations into the actions of the other officers involved.

On April 27, 2007, 14 additional charges against Abbate were announced. These included official misconduct, conspiracy, intimidation, and speaking with a witness. Abbate pleaded not guilty to all 15 charges during a brief hearing on May 16, 2007.

Referring to Abbate, Superintendent Phil Cline stated, "He's tarnished our image worse than anybody else in the history of the department." The video of the attack has been viewed worldwide on 24-hour news channels and has garnered more than 100,000 views on YouTube. In the wake of this scandal and a similar scandal related to another videotaped police beating at a bar, Cline announced his retirement on April 2, 2007. While both men have denied it, some believe that Cline retired under pressure from Mayor Richard M. Daley. Daley has since announced a plan to create an independent police review authority to replace the current Office of Professional Standards (OPS), which is under the jurisdiction of the police department.

On April 30, 2007, attorneys representing Obrycka filed a lawsuit in the United States District Court for the Northern District of Illinois against the city of Chicago and Abbate and several other individuals. On November 13, 2012, a federal jury found that a "widespread code of silence" within the Chicago Police Department had allowed Abbate to feel that he could attack Obrycka without fear of reprisal. They also found that Abbate participated in a conspiracy to cover up the attack. The jury awarded Obrycka $850,000 in damages.

Abbate was convicted of aggravated battery, a felony, on June 2, 2009. Cook County Circuit Judge John J. Fleming rejected Abbate's claims that he had acted in self-defense. However, since Obrycka testified that Abbate had not identified himself as an officer during the attack Abbate was acquitted of official misconduct charges. Abbate faced up to five years in prison for the attack. On June 23, 2009, Abbate was sentenced to two years probation, including a curfew between 8:00 p.m. and 6:00 a.m., mandatory attendance at anger management classes, and 130 hours of community service.

On December 15, 2009, Abbate was officially fired from the Chicago Police Department after a mandatory review by the Chicago Civilian Police Board. The firing was a formality, as the Chicago Police Department does not allow convicted felons to serve on the force.

=== Jerome Finnigan ===
Chicago Police Officers Jerome Finnigan, Keith Herrera, Carl Suchocki, and Thomas Sherry were indicted in September 2007 for robbery, kidnapping, home invasion, and other charges. They were alleged to have robbed drug dealers and ordinary citizens of money, drugs, and guns. The officers were all part of Special Operations Sections (SOS). The officers had allegedly victimized citizens for years; however, allegations of their misconduct were not investigated until 2004. According to the State's Attorney, the officers repeatedly missed court dates and allowed alleged drug dealers to go free. Several lawsuits alleging misconduct on behalf of Finnigan and his team have been filed in federal court. Since the original indictments, Jerome Finnigan has also been charged with attempting to have several fellow officers killed. Since the scandal involving Finnigan, SOS has been disbanded.

On February 11, 2009, charges against Chicago Police Department officers Tom Sherry and Carl Suchocki were dropped. A Cook County judge dismissed all criminal charges accusing them of robbery and home invasion after some evidence was proven to be false, and witnesses in the case against Sherry and Suchocki were unable to place the officers at the scene of the crime. Charges against Herrera and Finnigan, however, are still pending. As of September 25, 2009, seven former SOS officers have pleaded guilty to charges relating to the scandal. The investigation is ongoing as police officers continue to come forward and cooperate with the state and federal investigation.

=== Shooting of Flint Farmer ===
On June 7, 2011, Flint Farmer was fatally shot three times in the back by Chicago Police Officer Gildardo Sierra. Sierra and a partner had responded to a domestic disturbance call allegedly involving Farmer. When confronted by the police, Farmer fled. Sierra shot at Farmer multiple times, hitting him in the leg and abdomen. Publicly available police video shows Sierra circle the prone Farmer as three bright flashes emit from approximately waist level. The coroner who performed the autopsy on Farmer reported that Farmer could have survived the shots to the leg and abdomen, but any of the three shots through the back would have been fatal. Officer Sierra had been involved in two other shootings in 2011. Although the Chicago police department ruled the shooting justified, by October 23, 2011, Sierra had been stripped of his police powers and the FBI had opened an investigation into the incident. Eventually, no charges were brought against the officers. The city settled the civil case with Farmer's family for $4.1 million but did not admit fault.

=== Richard Zuley ===
Richard Zuley was a police detective who retired from the Chicago Police Department in 2007. After his retirement, multiple inquiries into overturned convictions that had relied on confessions he coerced triggered the Conviction Integrity Unit of the Cook County State's Attorney's Office to plan to subpoena Zuley's entire complaint history.

Zuley faces multiple lawsuits from individuals who claim he framed them, or beat confessions from them. Lathierial Boyd was exonerated and freed in 2013 after serving 23 years in prison, based on evidence from Zuley and suppression of exculpatory evidence. He filed a federal civil rights lawsuit, as well as suing the city, saying that Zuley framed him for a murder and attempted murder outside a nightclub in 1990. Anthony Garrett, who received a 100-year sentence for killing a seven-year-old boy, alleged Zuley beat his confession out of him.

On February 18, 2015, Spencer Ackerman, reporting in The Guardian, covered Zuley's alleged involvement in the torture and forced confessions of several homicide cases in Chicago. He said several inmates claimed abuse by Zuley.

In addition, he revealed additional details of Zuley's participation as a US Navy Reserve lieutenant from late 2002 to 2004 in the interrogation and torture of Guantanamo captive Mohamedou Ould Slahi. Slahi was among several men classified by the US as high-value detainees, for whom the Secretary of Defense authorized enhanced interrogation techniques, since characterized as torture.

Jason Meisner, writing in the Chicago Tribune, reported that The Guardian characterized Zuley's use of torture as "brutal and ineffective". Memos Zuley wrote, quoted in the Senate Intelligence Committee's report on the CIA's use of torture, described him using "stress positions"—the shackling of interrogation subjects in painful postures for extended periods of time. Zuley currently faces lawsuits in Chicago for using these techniques against American civilians.

=== Homan Square ===
The Guardian reported in February 2015 that the Chicago Police Department "operates an off-the-books interrogation compound, rendering Americans unable to be found by family or attorneys while locked inside what lawyers say is the domestic equivalent of a CIA black site." The Guardian added that the facility, the Homan Square Police Warehouse at 1011 S. Homan Ave in Chicago (41.8684°N 87.71°W), "has long been the scene of secretive work by special police units." The Guardian said that interviews with local attorneys and one protester "describe operations that deny access to basic constitutional rights ... The secretive warehouse ... trains its focus on Americans, most often poor, black and brown ... Witnesses, suspects or other Chicagoans who end up inside do not appear to have a public, searchable record entered into a database indicating where they are, as happens when someone is booked at a precinct. Lawyers and relatives insist there is no way of finding their whereabouts. Those lawyers who have attempted to gain access to Homan Square are most often turned away, even as their clients remain in custody inside."

After The Guardian published the story, the Chicago Police provided a statement saying, without specifics, that there is nothing improper taking place at what it called the "sensitive" location, home to undercover units. The statement said "CPD [Chicago Police Department] abides by all laws, rules and guidelines pertaining to any interviews of suspects or witnesses, at Homan Square or any other CPD facility. If lawyers have a client detained at Homan Square, just like any other facility, they are allowed to speak to and visit them." The Guardian said several attorneys and one Homan Square arrestee have denied this. The CPD statement continued by saying "There are always records of anyone who is arrested by CPD, and this is not any different at Homan Square." The Guardian said the Chicago Police statement did not address how long after an arrest or detention those records are generated or their availability to the public, and that a department spokesperson did not respond to a detailed request for clarification.

In October 2015, The Guardian reported a number of statistics they were able to uncover about the operation of the Homan Square site. They said that between August 2004 and June 2015, more than 7,000 people had been detained there (more than 6,000 of whom were black, a rate more than twice that of the city's population). Only 68 of those were given access to an attorney, there were no known instances in which the public was notified about a detention while the person was being held there, and those held there were not given access to telephones. Despite police directives to rapidly complete the booking process for detainees, there was no booking facility at the site and no such records had been generated there, and some detainees had been kept there for days. The statistics included only people who were eventually charged with a crime, as the police did not release information about those held there without being charged, saying it would be too difficult to provide that information. David Gaeger, an attorney who had represented clients taken to the facility, said "Try finding a phone number for Homan to see if anyone's there. You can't, ever. If you're laboring under the assumption that your client's at Homan, there really isn't much you can do as a lawyer. You're shut out. It's guarded like a military installation." and "That place was and is scary. There's nothing about it that resembles a police station."

=== Laquan McDonald ===
On October 20, 2014, 17-year-old Laquan McDonald was fatally shot by Officer Jason Van Dyke. The murder sparked protests and calls for the mayor to resign. A video was released which revealed McDonald walking down a street, carrying a knife. McDonald was walking parallel to the two police cars when he was shot 16 times. A criminal complaint filed in Cook County Circuit Court revealed that Van Dyke was the only officer to shoot, and the complaint also said that McDonald was on PCP at the time of his death. Protesters were frustrated that the video took 13 months to be released. A freelance journalist sued to have the footage released as it was a public record, and a judge found in the reporter's favor and the video became public in November 2015.

Van Dyke was charged with six counts of first-degree murder and one count of official misconduct. He remained on desk duty after the shooting. Van Dyke had a history of complaints in his career but was cleared in a majority of the cases. He pleaded not guilty on December 29, 2015, to the charges against him. After his arraignment, his attorney, Daniel Herbert, said that he would be looking for evidence to clear his client's name. On October 5, 2018, Van Dyke was found guilty of second-degree murder and 16 counts of aggravated battery with a firearm, but was found not guilty of official misconduct. On January 18, 2019, Van Dyke was sentenced to 6.75 years in prison for the second-degree murder conviction alone.

=== Raiding wrong addresses ===
Due to errors or acting on bad or faulty tips without double-checking information, Chicago police have raided incorrect addresses with no-knock warrants more than once in recent years. This has adversely affected goodwill towards officers in the community and costs the city in legal settlements. While new search warrant policies have been implemented by the CPD, including mandatory pre-checks and additional supervisors, one victim said she still believes the police department has a long way to go, and is "traumatizing Black Chicagoans in the process".

== Fallen officers ==
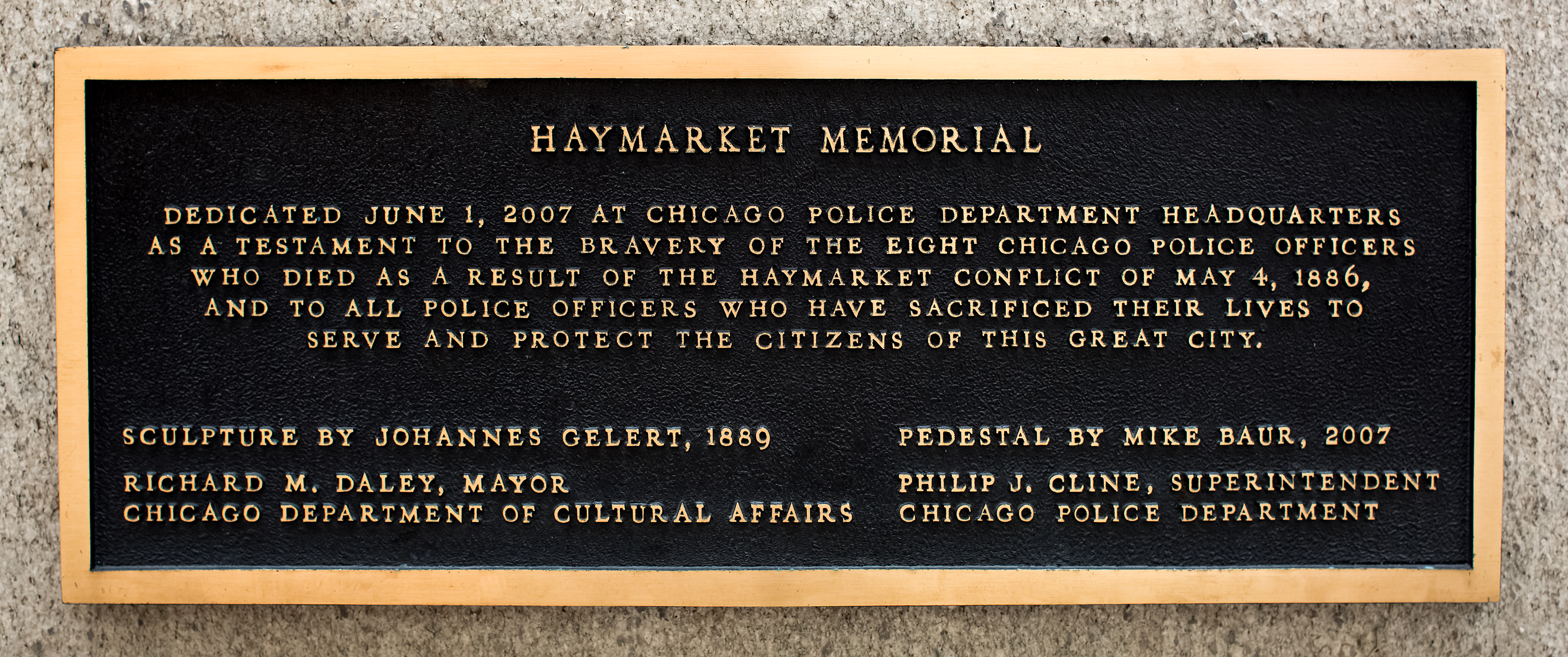
Marker under the Haymarket monument at Chicago Police headquarters

On December 5, 1853, James Quinn became the first Chicago police officer killed while on duty. 8 officers were killed and 59 were wounded during the Haymarket affair. Dorelle C. Brandon was killed on January 25, 1984, the first female officer to die on duty.

Since 1853, the Chicago Police Department has lost 571 officers in the line of duty. 40% of these deaths occurred between 1920 and 1939. By custom, the department retires the stars of fallen officers and mounts them in a display case at Police Headquarters.

== In popular culture ==
- The 1957–1960 television series M Squad centered on a squad of Chicago Police detectives. The episode "The Jumper" featured an officer taking bribes. It was reportedly this depiction that prompted then-Mayor Richard J. Daley to thereafter discourage motion picture and television location filming in the city for the rest of his administration and its aftermath. John Landis' successful 1980 musical comedy motion picture The Blues Brothers (see more below) marked the reversal of that policy by Mayor Jane Byrne.
- Two notable exceptions to Daley's ban were made for films released in 1975. In Brannigan, John Wayne portrays Chicago Police Lieutenant Jim Brannigan. Cooley High (set in 1964) was filmed entirely in Chicago and features a car chase through Navy Pier's warehouse buildings (since demolished), in which the pursuing Chicago police are repeatedly outmaneuvered by the joyriding teens.
- The Chicago Police Department and Illinois State Police are featured in the climactic car chase in 1980's The Blues Brothers in which a Chicago Police dispatcher matter-of-factly advises responding officers that "The use of unnecessary violence in the apprehension of the Blues Brothers has been approved." Reportedly in response to their portrayal in The Blues Brothers, the Chicago Police Department banned the use of the "Chicago Police" name and insignia in films until the early 2000s, resulting in several films and television shows replacing "Chicago Police" with "Metro Police" and other faux names, even if the films received technical assistance from the department, such as The Fugitive and The Negotiator.
- In the 1988 movie Child's Play, Chicago police officer Mark Norris (played by Chris Sarandon) and his colleague chase criminals Charles Lee Ray and Frank. In other scenes, there are various other CPD officers.
- Robert De Niro portrays a former Chicago police officer turned bounty hunter in the 1988 film Midnight Run. Numerous references are made to the CPD as well as corruption within the department. There are also a number of scenes directly involving the CPD.
- The Chicago Police Department played a major role in 1993's The Fugitive, showing them in a semi-brutal fashion after Kimble is incorrectly believed to have killed an on-duty police officer. The use of actual Chicago Police Department vehicles and uniforms is extensive and can be seen throughout the film. CPD can be seen again in its 1998 sequel, U.S. Marshals.
- In the 1998 film The Negotiator, the Chicago Police played a major role within the film. The real Chicago Police Department provided technical support for the movie's SWAT teams. The actors' shoulder sleeve insignia were similar to the Chicago Police Department's octagonal patches, albeit with "Chicago" replaced with "Metropolitan."
- Chicago police officers are routinely depicted on the television series ER.
- The Chicago police are portrayed in the 2011 Fox Network series The Chicago Code. Unlike most depictions of Chicago police, the actors' uniforms and insignia appear to be identical to their real-world counterparts, with the series being filmed on-location in the city.
- In The Lincoln Lawyer, Mickey Haller tells Detective Lankford that Frank Levin had been ex-Chicago PD to encourage him to investigate Levin's murder.
- The Terra Nova character Jim Shannon said he was a detective with the department's narcotics squad.
- The Chicago P.D. TV series is set inside the Chicago Police Department.
- The Chicago police appear in Square Enix's title Hitman: Absolution, where they hunt the player.
- The Chicago Police Department is featured in Ubisoft's action-thriller video-game, Watch Dogs.
- In the Netflix series Sense8, character Will Gorski is suspended from the Chicago Police Department.
- CBS's The Good Wife takes place in Chicago, and its characters frequently interact with officers of the Chicago Police Department. In the Season 6 finale of the show, protagonist Alicia Florrick's client is detained at Homan Square, and she eventually has his admission while detained at the facility dismissed by a judge.
- Mike & Molly, television comedy series (2010 to 2016), was based on an overweight couple; the lead character was a Chicago police officer. Melissa McCarthy and Billy Gardell star.
- The Power Book IV: Force TV series is set Chicago, and its characters frequently interact with a corrupt officer of the Chicago Police Department.

== Notable former officers ==
- Leonard Baldy, flying helicopter officer/traffic reporter for WGN
- Edward Allen Bernero, television writer and producer (Third Watch, Criminal Minds)
- Jon Burge, commander/detective, Area 2 (1970s–1993); accused of torturing suspects to coerce confessions
- Alderman Edward M. Burke (patrolman 1965–1968), longest-serving member of the Chicago City Council 1969 to 2023; past chairman of the Finance Committee; past chairman of the city council Police and Fire Committee
- Don Cornelius, creator, producer, and former host of Soul Train
- Willie Cochran (patrolman/sergeant 1975–2003), former alderman, Chicago City Council 2007–2019
- Johnny Dollar, Chicago blues guitarist, singer and songwriter
- Dennis Farina, actor
- Terrance Gainer, former Sergeant at Arms for the United States Senate
- Jack Muller, author of I, Pig and Motorcycle Cop
- Sergio Oliva, professional bodybuilder—Mr Olympia
- Allan Pinkerton, first detective in department history; founder of both the Pinkerton Detective Agency and the Union Intelligence Service (predecessor of the United States Secret Service)
- Charles H. Ramsey, Police Commissioner, Philadelphia P.D.; former Chief of Police, Washington, D.C.
- Renault Robinson, co-founder of the CPD's Afro-American Patrolman's League.
- Steve Wilkos, talk show host and former head of The Jerry Springer Show security team
- Richard Zuley, Chicago detective and later Guantánamo interrogator; accused of torture

== Tactics, software and equipment ==
=== Community policing ===
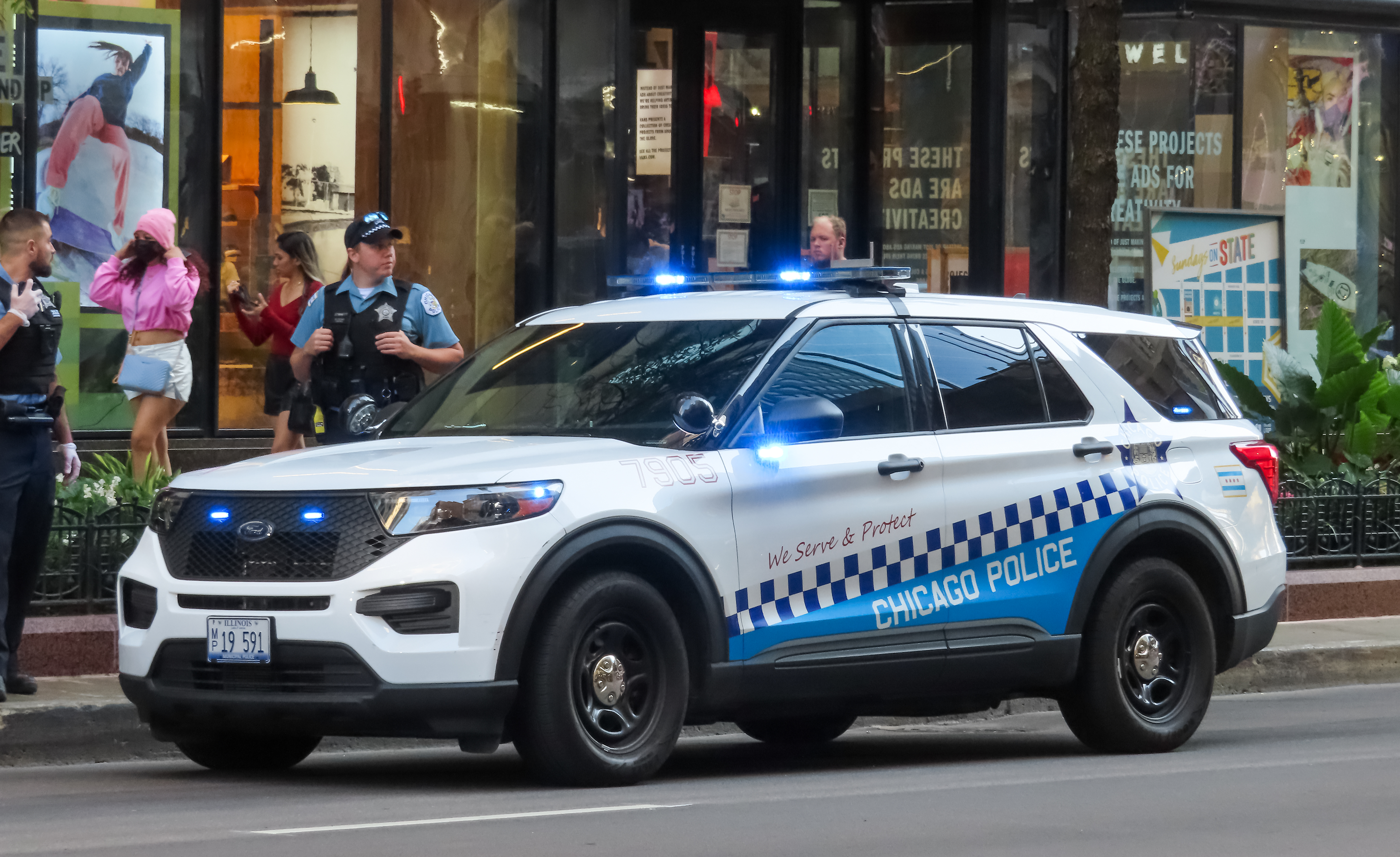
Chicago Police Department Ford Interceptor Utility

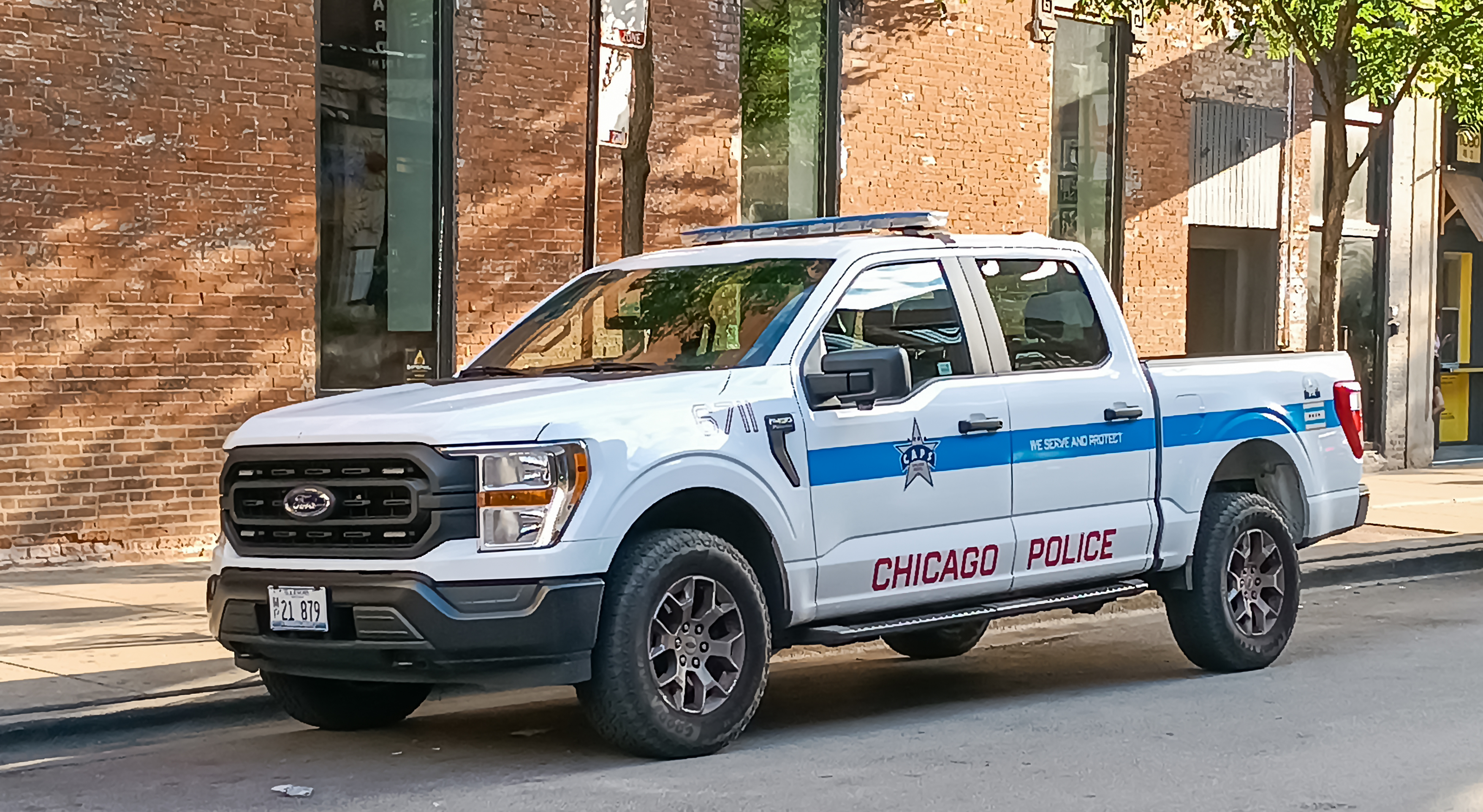
Ford F-150 of the CPD

The Chicago Police Department does community policing through the Chicago Alternative Policing Strategy program. It was established in 1992 and implemented in 1993 by then-Chicago Police Superintendent Matt L. Rodriguez. The program entails increasing police presence in individual communities with a force of neighborhood-based beat officers. Beat Community Meetings are held regularly for community members and police officials to discuss potential problems and strategies.

Under CAPS, 9-10 beat officers are assigned to each of Chicago's 279 police beats. The officers patrol the same beat for over a year, allowing them to get to know community members, residents, and business owners and to become familiar with community attitudes and trends. The system also allows for those same community members to get to know their respective officers and learn to be comfortable in approaching them for help when needed.

=== Strategic Subject List (SSL) ===
The Strategic Subject List (SSL) is a list of individuals generated by computer using a customized implementation of an algorithm developed by the Illinois Institute of Technology. The SSL algorithm calculates the propensity of individuals either committing or being targeted by gun violence. Now in its fourth iteration, the SSL has become a helpful indicator of the likelihood of murder, according to former Superintendent of Police Eddie Johnson. The algorithm looks at an individual's past criminal activities whilst specifically excluding biasing variables like race, gender, ethnicity, and location, according to Illinois Institute of Technology professor Miles Wernick, and assigns scores to individuals based on criminal record, known gang affiliation, and other variables.

As of 2016, the CPD created a list of 1,400 "strategic subjects" that has proven to be reliable and helpful to the department. By the end of 2016, more than 70 percent of firearm victims and 80 percent of the shooters appeared on the SSL. Moreover, of the 140 individuals who were arrested during a citywide gang raid performed that same year, 117 of them (83.6%) were on the list according to the CPD.

The SSL is also used by social workers and community leaders.

=== Equipment ===
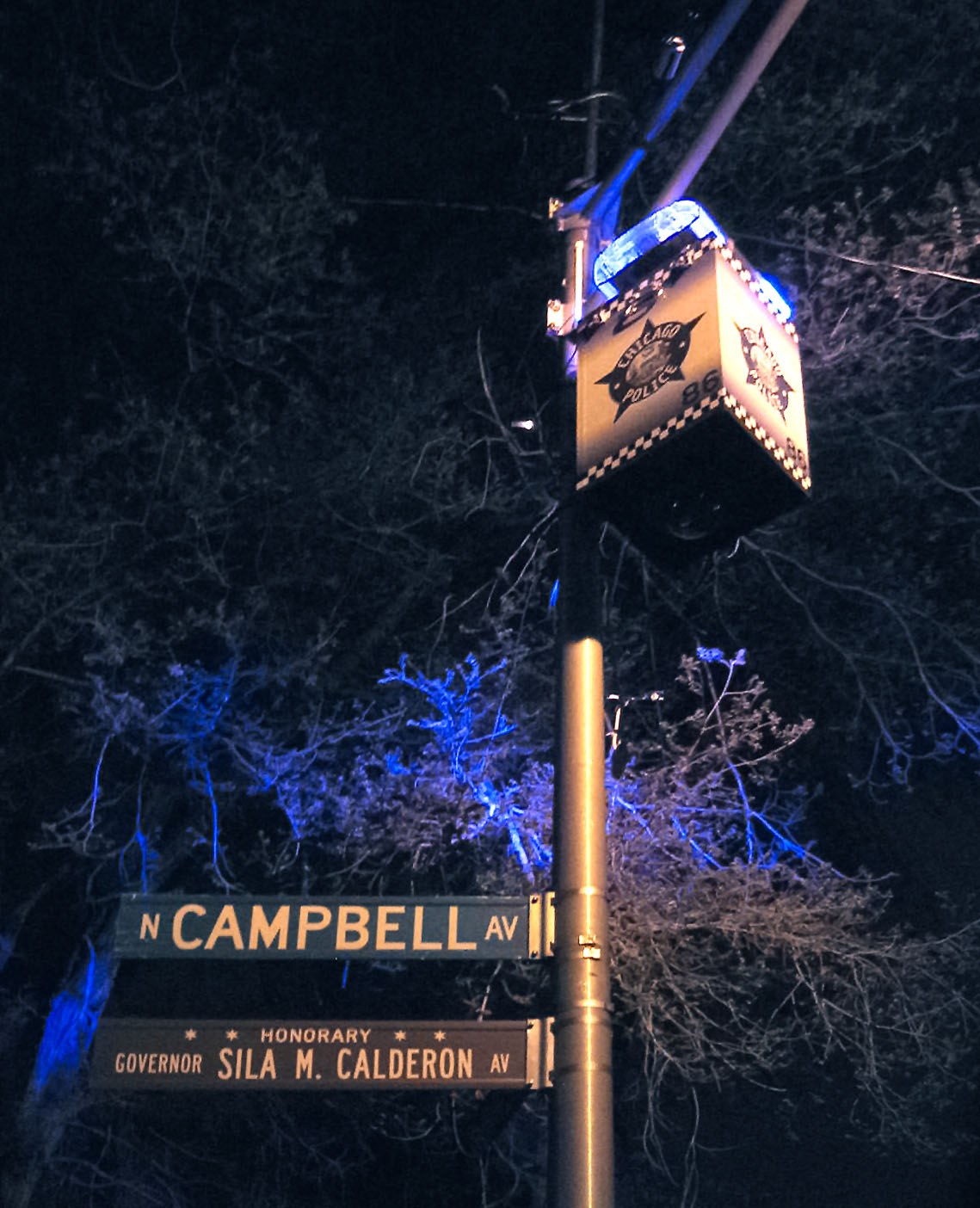
Chicago Police camera in 2006

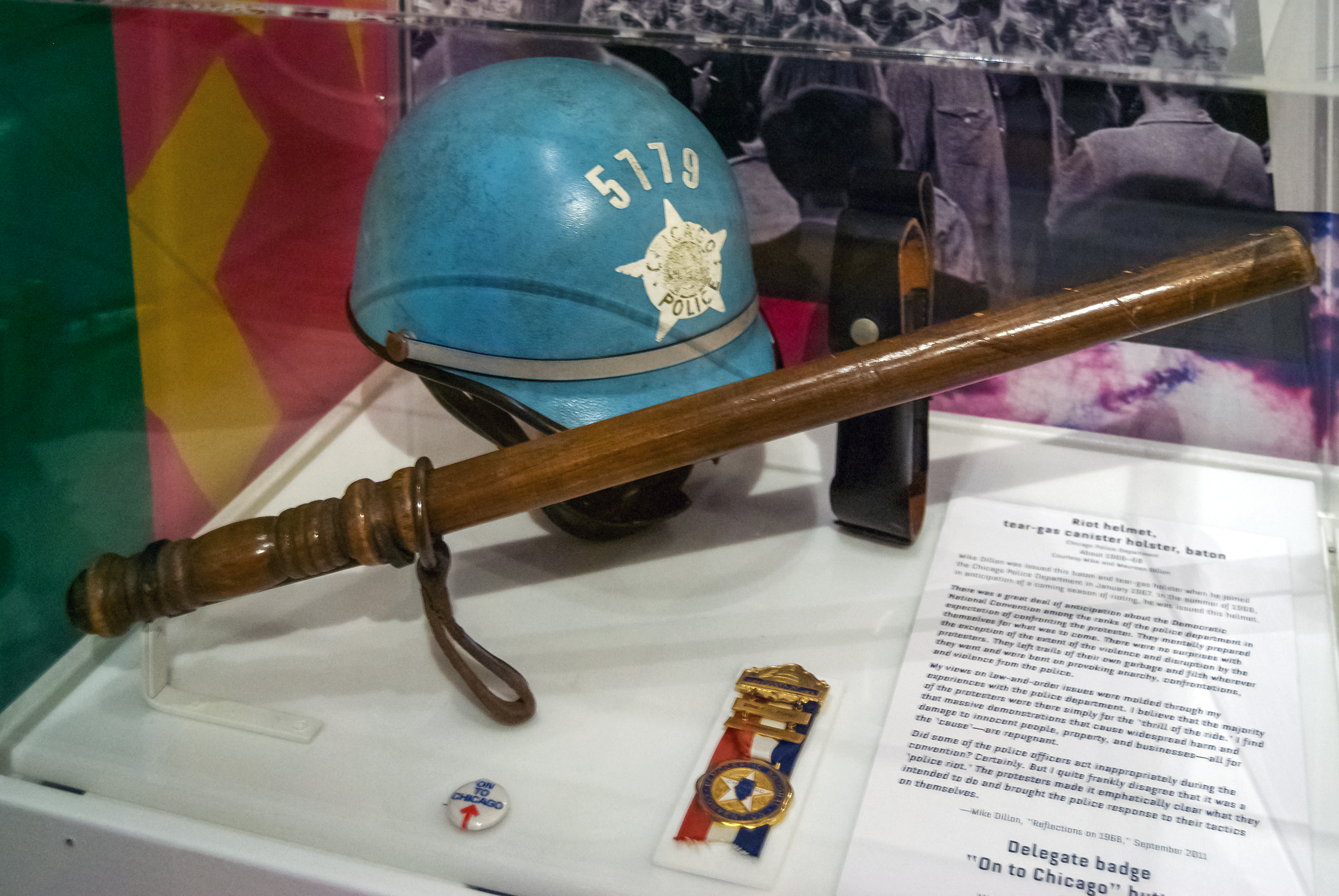
Chicago Police helmet & billy-club circa 1968

Chicago police officers are required to buy their own duty equipment (except Taser x2 and Motorola radio Motorola phone). All field officers must also be qualified to carry a Taser. Some officers choose to carry a backup weapon as well, which must meet certain specifications and requires annual qualification.

The prescribed semiautomatic pistol must meet the following requirements:

- Be manufactured by Beretta, SIG, Glock, Ruger, Smith & Wesson, or Springfield Armory.
- Be chambered in 9mm, .40 S&W, or .45 ACP.
- Be double-action only, hammer or striker-fired.

Officers who were hired on or before 1 December 1991 may keep their older double-action/single-action pistols, as well as their 4"-barrel Smith & Wesson, Ruger or Colt revolvers in .38 Special or .357 Magnum. Recruits hired on or after 28 August 2015 must choose from Springfield Armory, Smith & Wesson, or Glock striker-fired 9mm pistols. Officers hired before 19 May 2008 may continue to use the Double Action Only (DAO) Beretta, Ruger, SIG Sauer, and S&W pistols for duty use.

It was reported in June 2018 that the agency would allow the authorization of the SIG Sauer P320 as another service pistol to be chosen by officers to carry. Shortly after the P320 appeared on the authorized firearms list.

Patrol vehicles contain long gun racks. Remington 870 12-gauge shotguns are available in the event that additional firepower is needed. Officers must complete five days of training to carry an AR-15 type rifle and have the option to purchase their own or use a department-provided one.

== Ranks ==
Title	Insignia	Information
Superintendent		The Superintendent is in charge of running the entire police department. The Superintendent is Appointed by the Mayor of Chicago. This is the highest rank in the Chicago Police Department.
First Deputy Superintendent		The First Deputy Superintendent is appointed by the Superintendent of Police. This is the second highest rank in the Chicago Police Department.
Chief		Chiefs are typically in command of a bureau.
Deputy Chief		Deputy Chiefs are Second-in-Command of a bureau in some cases, or commander of an area in others.
Commander		Commanders are typically in charge of a district or a division.
Captain		Captains are typically executive officers of districts.
Lieutenant		Lieutenants are in charge of a unit or section.
Sergeant		Sergeants are supervisors of a group of Officers.
Field Training Officer		Field training officers wear one chevron over one rocker, with "FTO" in the center of the insignia but are not considered ranking officers.
Police Officer/assigned as: Detective/Youth Officer/Gang Specialist/Police Agent/Major Accident Investigator/etc.	No insignia	Chicago detectives are not considered ranking officers, but rather officers assigned to specialized units, e.g. violent crimes, robbery, gang and narcotics (NAGIS), Internal Affairs Division (IAD), Major Accident Investigation Section (MAIS), etc. (Unless they hold the rank of sergeant or above.)
Police Officer	No insignia	Police officers are the first ranking officers. They are dispatched to radio assignments, conduct patrol, and respond to other emergencies as needed.

== See also ==
- Chicago Police Accountability Task Force
- Citizen Law Enforcement Analysis and Reporting
- Crime in Chicago
- Cook County Sheriff's Office
- List of law enforcement agencies in Illinois

== Works cited ==
- Merriner, James (2004). Grafters and Goo Goos: Corruption and Reform in Chicago, 1833-2003. Southern Illinois University Press. ISBN 0809325713.
- "History". Chicago Police Department. Archived from the original on December 13, 2024.
