= Department of the Army Special Photographic Office =

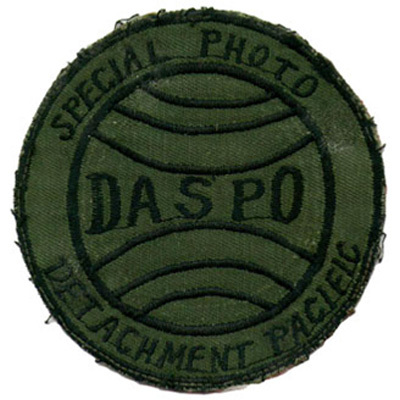
- DASPO Pacific insignia
- Active: 1962 – 1974
- Allegiance: United States

Department of the Army Special Photographic Office (DASPO) was a unit of the United States Department of the Army from 1962 to 1974. The unit provided numerous images of the Vietnam War.

== Unit history ==
DASPO was authorized by President John F. Kennedy in 1962. Col. Arthur A. Jones was tasked with providing documentary films to the United States Army, the staff at the Pentagon, Joint Chiefs of Staff, and United States Congress. DASPO had three sections: DASPO CONUS (Continental United States), DASPO Panama, and DASPO Pacific.

On assignment, DASPO teams captured photographs and videos of combat action, military movements, and military equipment. The officers assigned to the unit coordinated activities. Enlisted personnel assigned to the unit served on the front lines to provide the photography.

DASPO photographers operated with nearly unlimited access and took direct orders from the Army Chief of Staff.

=== DASPO CONUS ===
DASPO CONUS (Continental United States) was headed by SFC Jack Yamuguchi. Unlike DASPO Pacific and DASPO Panama, DASPO CONUS was stationed in the United States and was capable of being sent anywhere in the world.

In April 1965, civil unrest broke out in the Dominican Republic and President Lyndon Johnson sent U.S. troops to secure peace. Shortly after, the DASPO office at the Pentagon lost contact with the DASPO Panama Detachment. A team working for DASPO CONUS at the time was assigned to cover the invasion in the Dominican Republic and was led by First Lieutenant Carl Conn.

This DASPO CONUS team was to document the military operation in the Dominican Republic as U.S. troops came under sniper fire in an urban environment. Early on in the invasion, the civilian press was invited to a press tour hosted by the rebel group. The DASPO team disguised themselves in civilian clothes and accompanied civilian journalist on the press tour, filming the rebels' equipment and combat positions along the way. Later, Lieutenant Conn and other members of the DASPO CONUS team were awarded the Combat Army Commendation Medal for their service in the Dominican Republic.

=== DASPO Panama ===
The Panama Detachment was based in Corozal within the Panama Canal Zone and provided photographic and video coverage documenting political activity in Central and South America. DASPO Panama was the smallest of the three DASPO unites. It was authorized for seven members and a single commanding officer. In 1971, this was unofficially augmented with an individual serving as a clerk and supply NCO.

DASPO Panama covered many historical events, including the Panama Riots of 1964, the interrogation of Che Guevara after his capture, the inauguration and later overthrow of President Arnulfo Arias Madrid, and U.S. relief efforts following national disasters. They also documented the training of U.S. troops in the Panama Canal Zone and other areas of Central and South America.

=== DASPO Pacific ===
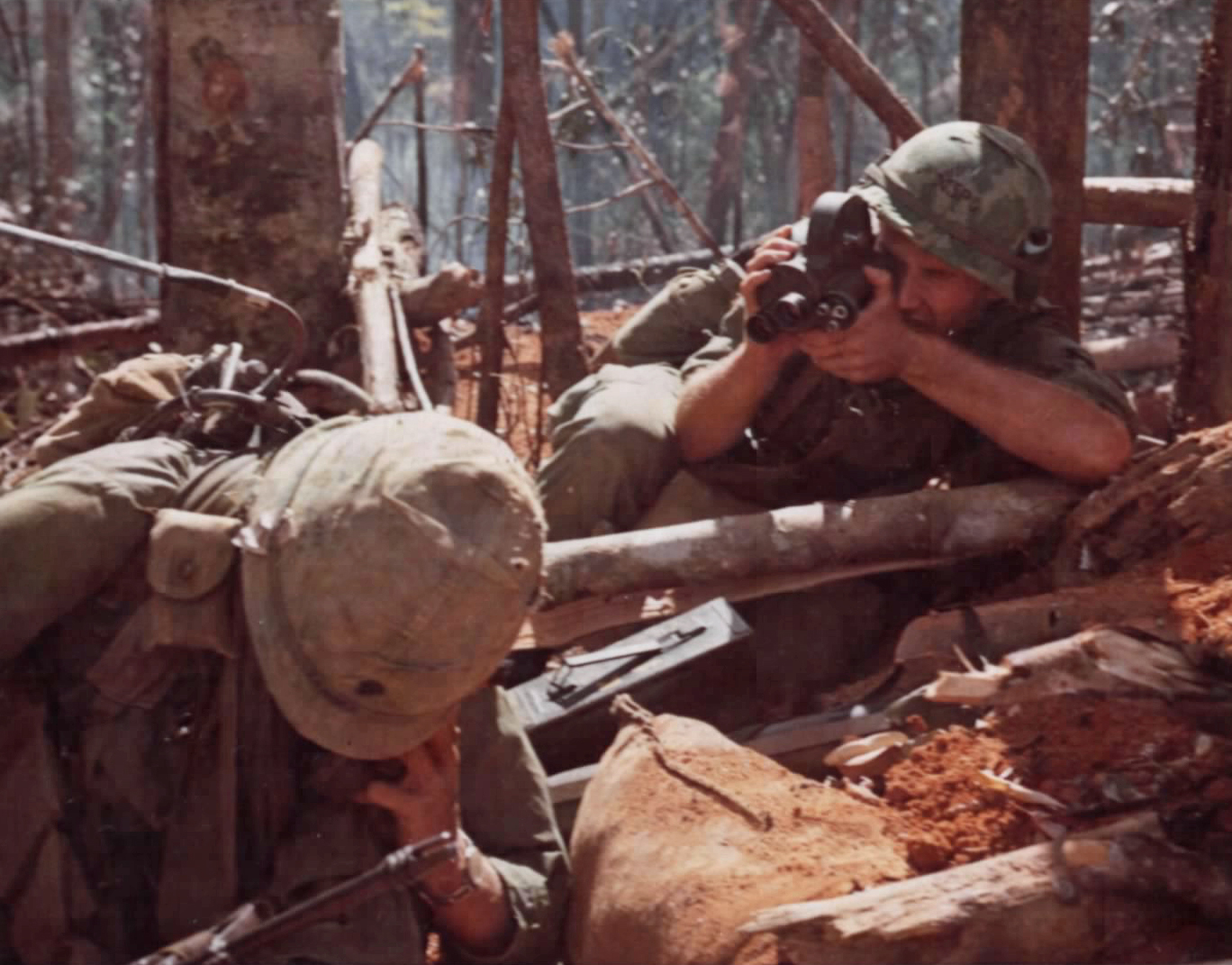
DASPO cameraman PFC Burt Peterson films a member of the 4th Battalion, 173rd Airborne Brigade, during the assault on Hill 875, November 1967

The Pacific Detachment, nicknamed "Team Charlie" by its members, was the most active of the DASPO sections due to its coverage of Vietnam War combat operations. It was based in Fort Schafter in Hawaii. DASPO Pacific sent rotating teams of photographers into Vietnam for three-month tours of duty. Although other military departments and press organizations sent their own photographers into the war zones, DASPO was considered "the Army's elite photographic unit."

The Vietnam teams usually consisted of a commanding officer, a non-commissioned officer, and 10-18 enlisted sound specialists, motion picture cameramen, and still photographers. From their base in Saigon, DASPO photographers would follow combat units through swamps and jungles, capturing the soldiers' experiences. In his book Vietnam: Images from Combat Photographers, author C. Douglas Elliott writes that DASPO Pacific "showed soldiers--often teenagers--coping as best they could with unrelenting heat and humidity, heavy packs, heavy guns, and an invisible enemy whose mines, booby traps, and snipers could cut life short without a moment's warning."

The DASPO photographers put themselves at personal risk and suffered many of the same hardships as the soldiers that they documented.

== "Faces of War" exhibit ==
On September 24, 2015, the exhibit "Faces of War: Documenting the Vietnam War from the Front Lines" opened at the Pritzker Military Museum and Library in Chicago, Illinois. The exhibit was largely planned by DASPO veterans Bill San Hamel, Dick Durrance, and Ted Acheson. They raised more than $30,000 from members and supporters of the DASPO organization to cover operating costs of the exhibit, and raised additional funds through a Kickstarter campaign.

San Hamel, president of the DASPO Combat Photographers Association, said: "I’m proud of the men of DASPO with whom I’ve served, and we are grateful to the Pritzker Military Museum & Library for supporting us and giving us the opportunity to inform the American public about who we were as combat photographers and what we and our fellow veterans went through."

The exhibit ran until May 2016.

== Legacy ==
The photographs and videos captured by DASPO document the Vietnam War and are now historical artifacts of this period. The purpose of DASPO was to inform the Pentagon and the Department of the Army, but their photos also often accompanied news reports and introduced the American public to the realities of the faraway war. These special operations photographers produced "some of the most iconic and important images from the conflict."

DASPO members established the DASPO Archive and a scholarship fund at Texas Tech University. The scholarship funds the preservation of images and audio recordings and is in the names of Kermit H. Yoho and Charles "Rick" F. Rein, DASPO members who were killed in action in Vietnam.

== Veterans' association ==
The unit has an active veterans' association.
