= History of the United Kingdom =

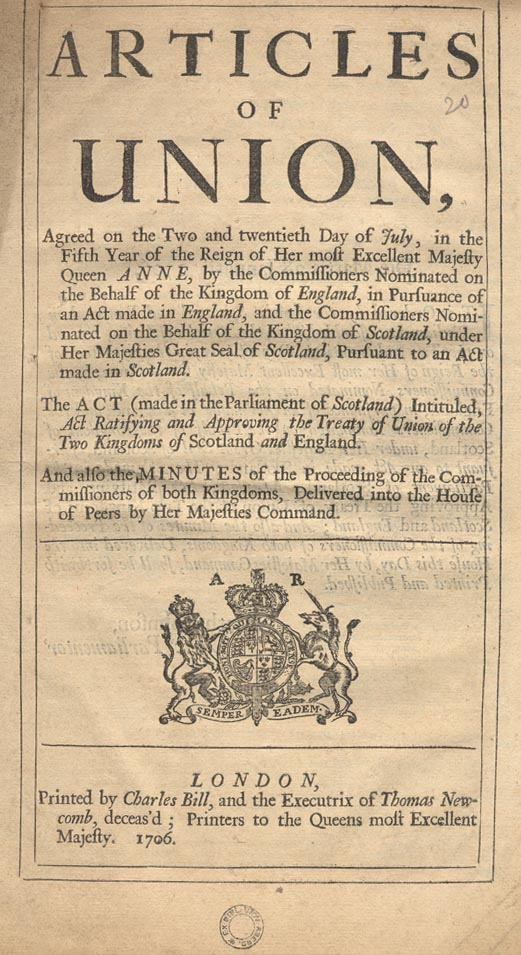
A published version of the Treaty of Union agreement, which led to the creation of the Kingdom of Great Britain in 1707

The history of the United Kingdom begins in 1707 with the Treaty of Union and Acts of Union. The core of the United Kingdom as a unified state came into being with the political union of the kingdoms of England and Scotland, into a new unitary state called Great Britain. (Note: The terms One Kingdom, United Kingdom and United Kingdom of Great Britain were used as descriptions in the Treaty of Union. However, the actual name of the new state was Great Britain. The name Great Britain (then sometimes spelled Great Brittaine) was first used by James VI/I in October 1604, who indicated that henceforth he and his successors would be viewed as Kings of Great Britain, not Kings of England and Scotland. However the name was not applied to a new state; both England and Scotland continued to be governed independently. Its validity as a name of the Crown is also questioned, given that monarchs continued using separate ordinals (e.g., James VI/I, James VII/II) in England and Scotland. To avoid confusion historians generally avoid using the term King of Great Britain until 1707 and instead to match the ordinal usage call the monarchs kings or queens of England and Scotland. Separate ordinals were abandoned when the two states merged in accordance with the Acts of Union, with subsequent monarchs using ordinals clearly based on English not Scottish history. One example is Queen Elizabeth II of the United Kingdom, who is referred to as being "the Second" even though there never was an Elizabeth I of Scotland or Great Britain. Thus the term Great Britain is generally used from 1707.)

The first decades were marked by Jacobite risings which ended with defeat for the Stuart cause at the Battle of Culloden in 1746. In 1763, victory in the Seven Years' War led to the growth of the First British Empire. With defeat by the US, France and Spain in the War of American Independence, Great Britain lost its 13 American colonies and rebuilt a Second British Empire based in Asia and Africa. Politically the central event was the French Revolution and its Napoleonic aftermath from 1793 to 1815, which British elites saw as a profound threat, and worked energetically to form multiple coalitions that finally defeated Napoleon in 1815. The Acts of Union 1800 added the Kingdom of Ireland to create the United Kingdom of Great Britain and Ireland.

The Tories, who came to power in 1783, remained in power until 1830. Forces of reform opened decades of political reform that broadened the ballot, and opened the economy to free trade. The outstanding political leaders of the 19th century included Palmerston, Disraeli, Gladstone, and Salisbury. Culturally, the Victorian era was a time of prosperity and dominant middle-class virtues when Britain dominated the world economy and maintained a generally peaceful century from 1815 to 1914. The First World War, with Britain in alliance with France, Russia and the US, was a furious but ultimately successful total war with Germany. The resulting League of Nations was a favourite project in Interwar Britain. In 1922, 26 counties of Ireland seceded to become the Irish Free State; a day later, Northern Ireland seceded from the Free State and returned to the United Kingdom. In 1927, the United Kingdom changed its formal title to the United Kingdom of Great Britain and Northern Ireland, usually shortened to Britain, United Kingdom or UK. While the Empire remained strong, as did the London financial markets, the British industrial base began to slip behind Germany and the US. Sentiments for peace were so strong that the nation supported appeasement of Hitler's Germany in the 1930s, until the Nazi invasion of Poland in 1939 started the Second World War. In the Second World War, the Soviet Union and the US joined the UK as the main Allied powers.

After the war, Britain was no longer a military or economic superpower, as seen in the Suez Crisis of 1956. Britain granted independence to almost all its possessions. The new states typically joined the Commonwealth of Nations. The postwar years saw great hardships, alleviated somewhat by large-scale financial aid from the US. Prosperity returned in the 1950s. Meanwhile, from 1945 to 1950, the Labour Party built a welfare state, nationalised many industries, and created the National Health Service. The UK took a strong stand against Communist expansion after 1945, playing a major role in the Cold War and the formation of NATO as an anti-Soviet military alliance with West Germany, France, the US, Italy, Canada and smaller countries. The UK has been a leading member of the United Nations since its founding, as well as other international organisations. In the 1990s, neoliberalism led to the privatisation of nationalised industries and significant deregulation of business affairs. London's status as a world financial hub grew. Since the 1990s, large-scale devolution movements in Northern Ireland, Scotland and Wales have decentralised political decision-making. Britain has moved back and forth on its economic relationships with Western Europe. It joined the European Economic Community in 1973, thereby weakening economic ties with its Commonwealth. However, the Brexit referendum in 2016 committed the UK to leave the European Union, which it did in 2020.

== 18th century ==
=== Birth of the Union ===
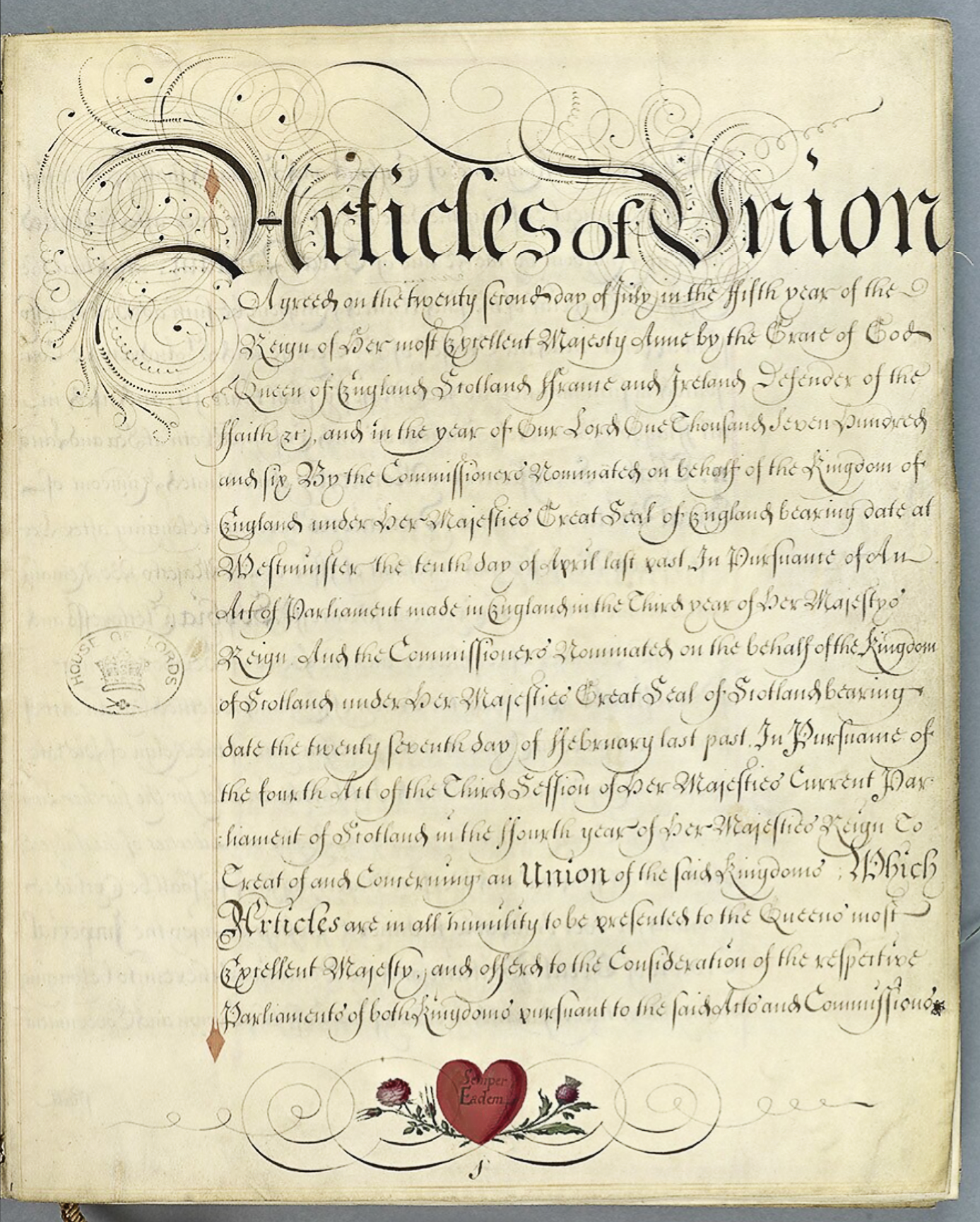
"Articles of Union with Scotland", 1707

The Kingdom of Great Britain came into being on 1 May 1707, as a result of the political union of the Kingdom of England (which included Wales) and the Kingdom of Scotland under the Treaty of Union. This combined the two kingdoms into a single kingdom and merged the two parliaments into a single parliament of Great Britain. Queen Anne became the first monarch of the new Great Britain. Although now a single kingdom, certain institutions of Scotland and England remained separate, such as Scottish and English law; and the Presbyterian Church of Scotland and the Anglican Church of England. England and Scotland each continued to have their own system of education.

Meanwhile, the War of the Spanish Succession against France was underway. It see-sawed back and forth until the treaties of Utrecht and Rastadt ended the war. Historian G. M. Trevelyan argues:

That Treaty [of Utrecht], which ushered in the stable and characteristic period of Eighteenth-Century civilization, marked the end of danger to Europe from the old French monarchy, and it marked a change of no less significance to the world at large,—the maritime, commercial and financial supremacy of Great Britain.

=== Hanoverian kings ===
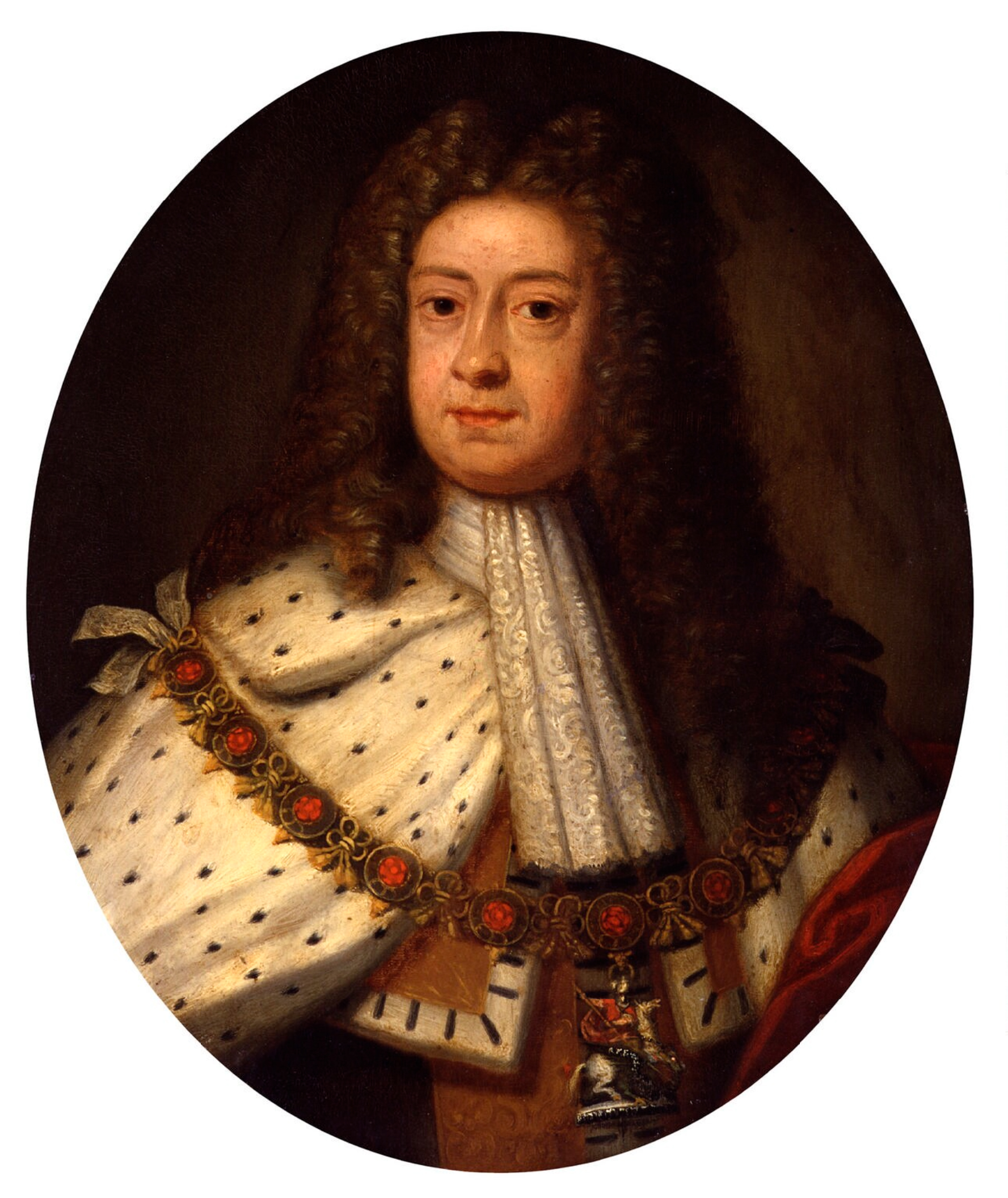
George I in 1714, by Godfrey Kneller

The Stuart line died with Anne in 1714, although a die-hard faction with French support supported pretenders. The Elector of Hanover became king as George I. He paid more attention to Hanover and surrounded himself with Germans, making him an unpopular king. He did, however, build up the army and created a more stable political system in Britain and helped bring peace to northern Europe. Jacobite factions seeking a Stuart restoration remained strong; they instigated a revolt in 1715–1716. The son of James II planned to invade England, but before he could do so, John Erskine, Earl of Mar, launched an invasion from Scotland, which was easily defeated.

George II enhanced the stability of the constitutional system, with a government run by Robert Walpole during the period 1730–42. He built up the First British Empire, strengthening the colonies in the Caribbean and North America. In coalition with the rising power Prussia, the United Kingdom defeated France in the Seven Years' War, and won full control of Canada.

George III never visited Hanover, and spoke English as his first language. Reviled by Americans as a tyrant and the instigator of the American War of Independence, he was often insane after 1788, and his eldest son served as regent. He was the last king to dominate government and politics, and his long reign is noted for losing the first British Empire in the American Revolutionary War (1783). The reign was notable for the building of a second empire based in India, Asia and Africa, the beginnings of the Industrial Revolution that made Britain an economic powerhouse, and the life and death struggle with the French, in the French Revolutionary Wars, which ended inconclusively with a short truce, and the epic Napoleonic Wars, which ended with the decisive defeat of Napoleon.

=== South Sea Bubble ===
Entrepreneurs extended the range of their business around the globe. The South Sea Bubble was a business enterprise that exploded in scandal. The South Sea Company was a joint-stock company in London. Its ostensible object was to grant trade monopolies in South America; but its actual purpose was to renegotiate previous high-interest government loans amounting to £31 million through market manipulation and speculation. It raised money four times in 1720 by issuing stock, which was purchased by about 8,000 investors. The share price kept increasing, from £130 a share to £1,000, with insiders making huge paper profits. The Bubble collapsed overnight, ruining speculators. Investigations showed bribes had reached into high places—even to the king. Robert Walpole wound it down with minimal political and economic damage.

=== Robert Walpole ===
Robert Walpole is now generally regarded as the first Prime Minister, from, 1721–42. The term was applied to him by friends and foes alike by 1727. Historian Clayton Roberts summarizes his new functions:

He monopolized the counsels of the King, he closely superintended the administration, he ruthlessly controlled patronage, and he led the predominant party in Parliament. Walpole was a master of the effective use of patronage, as were his two disciples who succeeded him as prime minister, Henry Pelham and Pelham's brother the Duke of Newcastle.

=== Moralism and hypocrisy ===
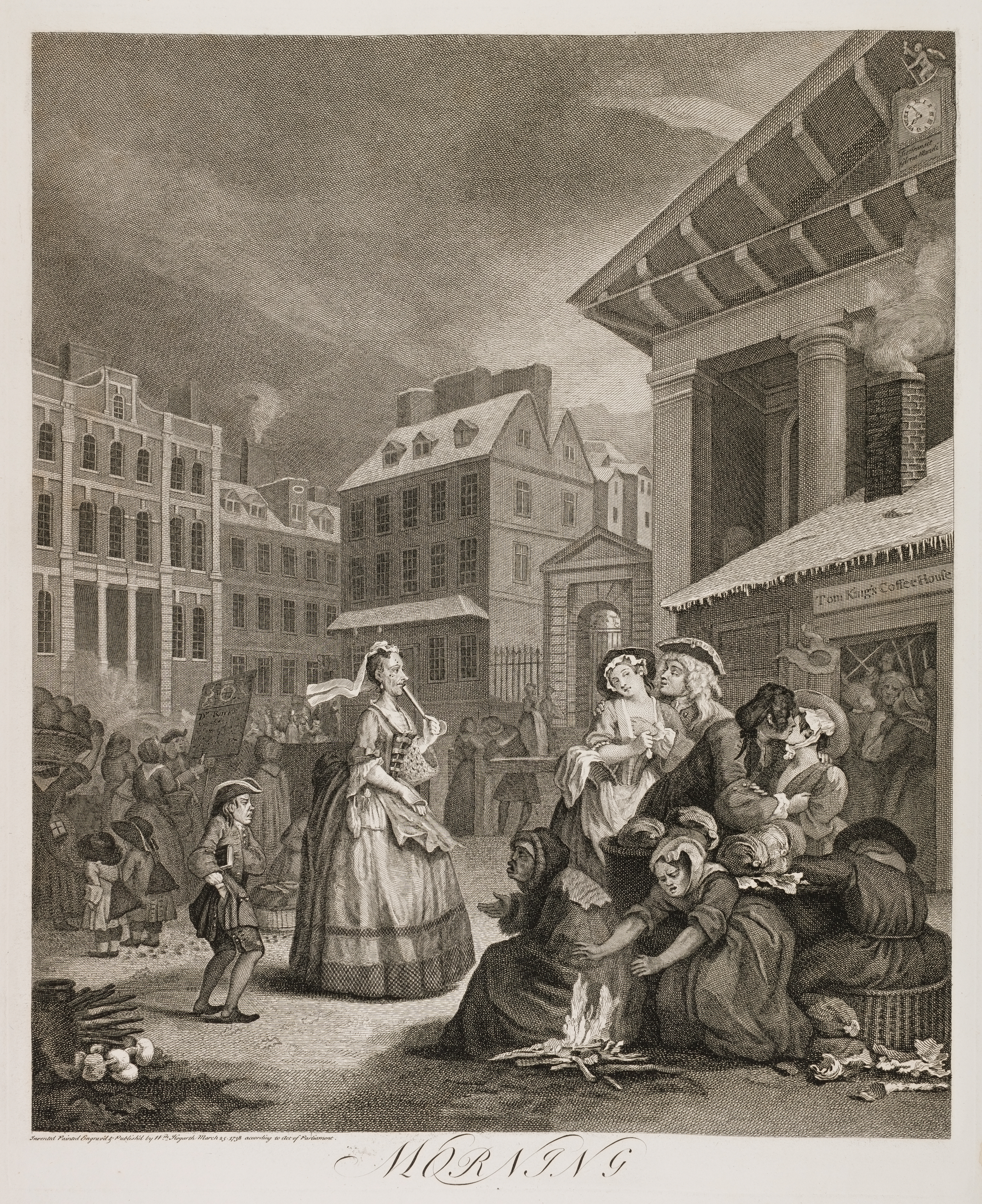
18th-century London by William Hogarth

Hypocrisy became a major topic in political history in the early 18th century. The Toleration Act 1688 allowed for rights for religious minorities, but Protestant Nonconformists were still deprived of important rights, such as the right to hold office. Nonconformists who wanted to hold office ostentatiously took the Anglican sacrament once a year to avoid the restrictions. High Church Anglicans were outraged, and outlawed "occasional conformity" with the Occasional Conformity Act 1711. Using sermons, speeches, and pamphlet wars, high churchmen and Nonconformists attacked their opponents as insincere and hypocritical, as well as dangerously zealous. Historian Mark Knights argues that by its ferocity, the debate may have led to more temperate and less hypercharged political discourse. "Occasional conformity" was restored by the Whigs when they returned to power in 1719.

English author Bernard Mandeville's famous "The Fable of the Bees" explored the nature of hypocrisy in contemporary European society. He argued that the efforts of self-seeking entrepreneurs are the basis of emerging commercial and industrial society, a line of thought that influenced Adam Smith and 19th-century Utilitarianism. A tension arose between these two approaches concerning the relative power of norms and interests, the relationship between motives and behaviour, and the historical variability of human cultures.

From around 1750 to 1850, Whig aristocrats in England boasted of their special benevolence for the common people. They claimed to be guiding reform initiatives to prevent the discontent that caused instability and revolution across Europe. However Tory and radical critics accused the Whigs of hypocrisy—alleging they were deliberately using the slogans of reform and democracy to boost themselves into power. Historian L.G. Mitchell defends the Whigs, pointing out that thanks to them radicals always had friends at the centre of the elite, and thus did not feel as marginalised as in most of Europe. Meanwhile, a stream of observers from the Continent commented on the British political culture. Liberal and radical observers noted the servility of the lower classes, the obsession everyone had with rank and title, the extravagance of the aristocracy, and a pervasive hypocrisy that extended into such areas as social reform. There were not so many conservative visitors. They praised the stability of English society, its ancient constitution, and reverence for the past; they ignored the negative effects of industrialisation.

Historians have explored crimes and vices of England's upper classes, especially duelling, suicide, adultery and gambling. They were tolerated by the same courts that executed thousands of poor men for lesser offenses. No aristocrat was punished for killing someone in a duel. However the emerging popular press specialised in sensationalistic stories about upper-class vice.

=== Warfare and finance ===
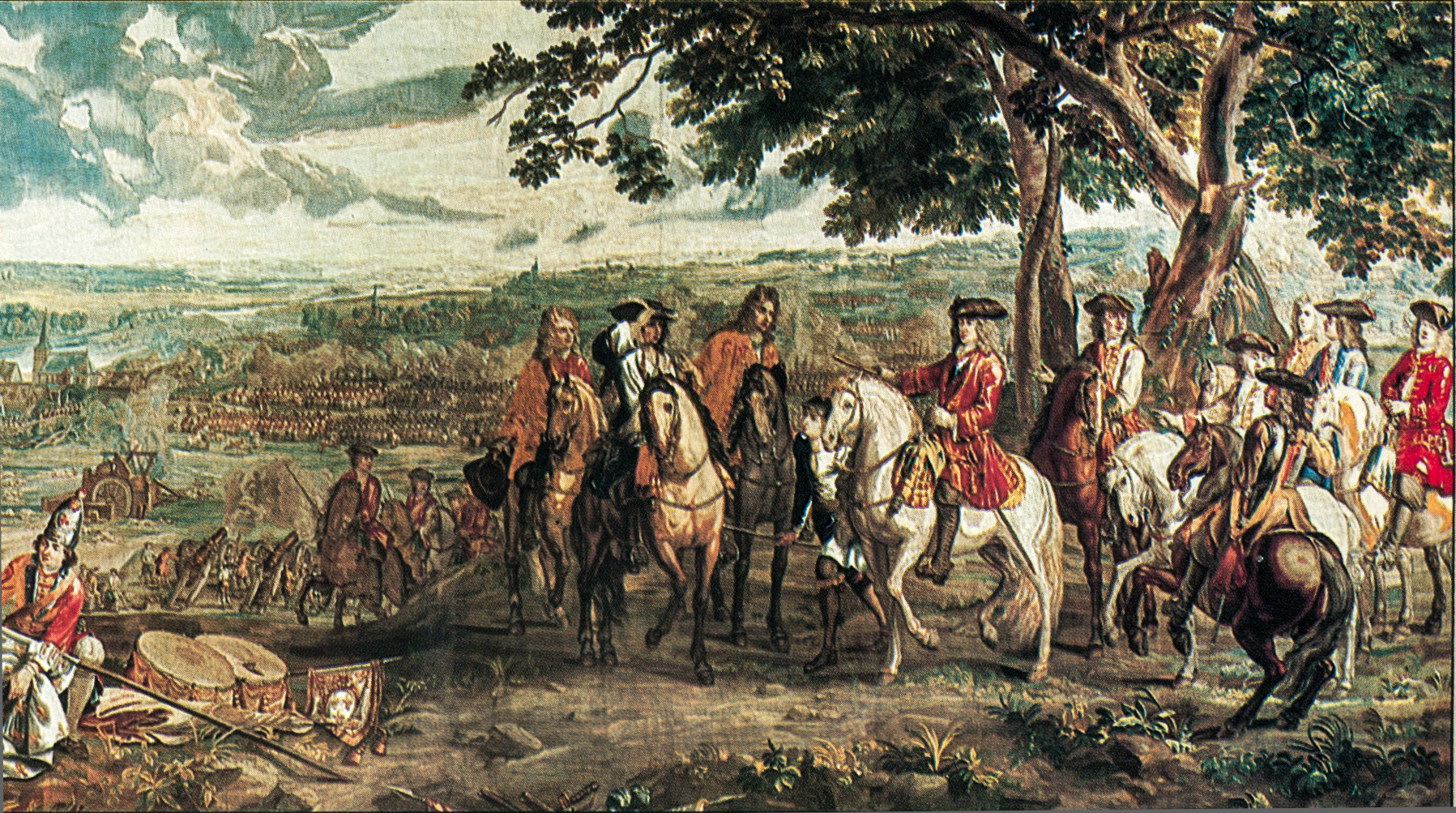
John Churchill, Duke of Marlborough accepts the French surrender at Blenheim, 1704.

From 1700 to 1850, Britain was involved in 137 wars or rebellions. It maintained a relatively large and expensive Royal Navy, along with a small standing army. When the need arose for soldiers it hired mercenaries or financed allies who fielded armies. The rising costs of warfare forced a shift in sources of government financing, from the income from royal agricultural estates and special imposts and taxes to reliance on customs and excise taxes; and, after 1790, an income tax. Working with bankers in the city, the government raised loans during wartime and paid them off in peacetime. The rise in taxes amounted to 20% of national income, but the private sector benefited from the increase in economic growth. The demand for war supplies stimulated the industrial sector, particularly naval supplies, munitions and textiles, which gave Britain an advantage in international trade during the postwar years.

The French Revolution polarised British political opinion in the 1790s, with conservatives outraged at the killing of the king, the expulsion of the nobles, and the Reign of Terror. Britain was at war against France almost continuously from 1793 until the final defeat of Napoleon in 1815. Conservatives castigated radical opinion in Britain as "Jacobin" (in reference to the leaders of the Terror), warning that radicalism threatened an upheaval of society. The Anti-Jacobin sentiment, well expressed by Edmund Burke and many popular writers was strongest among the landed gentry and upper classes.

=== British Empire ===
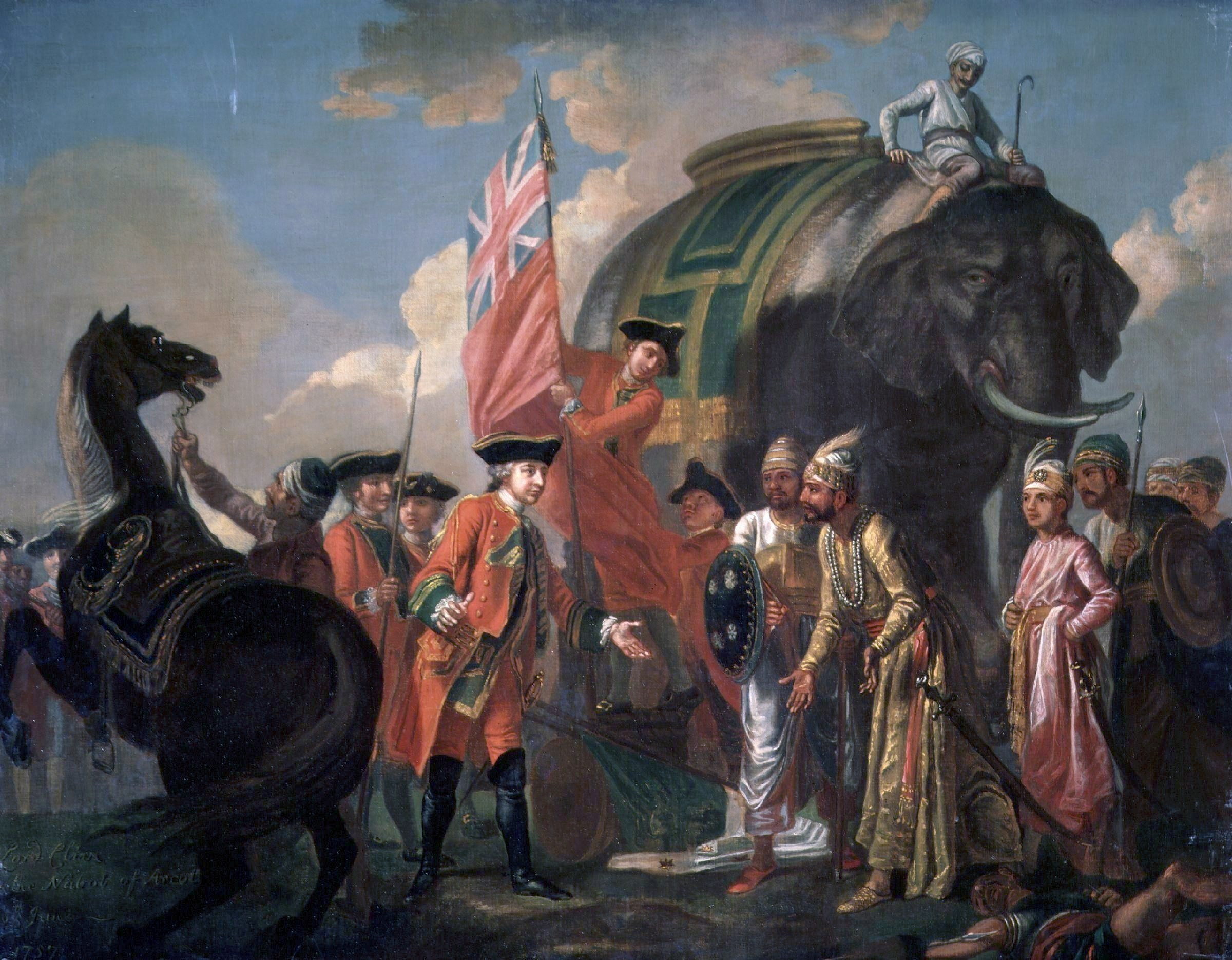
Lord Clive meeting with Mir Jafar after the Battle of Plassey, by Francis Hayman (c. 1762)

The Seven Years' War, which began in 1756, was the first waged on a global scale, fought in Europe, India, North America, the Caribbean, the Philippines and coastal Africa. Britain was the big winner as it enlarged its empire at the expense of France and others. France lost its role as a colonial power in North America. It ceded New France to Britain, Spain ceded Florida. In India, the Carnatic war had left France still in control of its small enclaves but with military restrictions and an obligation to support British client states, effectively leaving the future of India to Britain. The British victory over France in the Seven Years' War left Britain as the world's dominant colonial power.

==== American Revolution ====
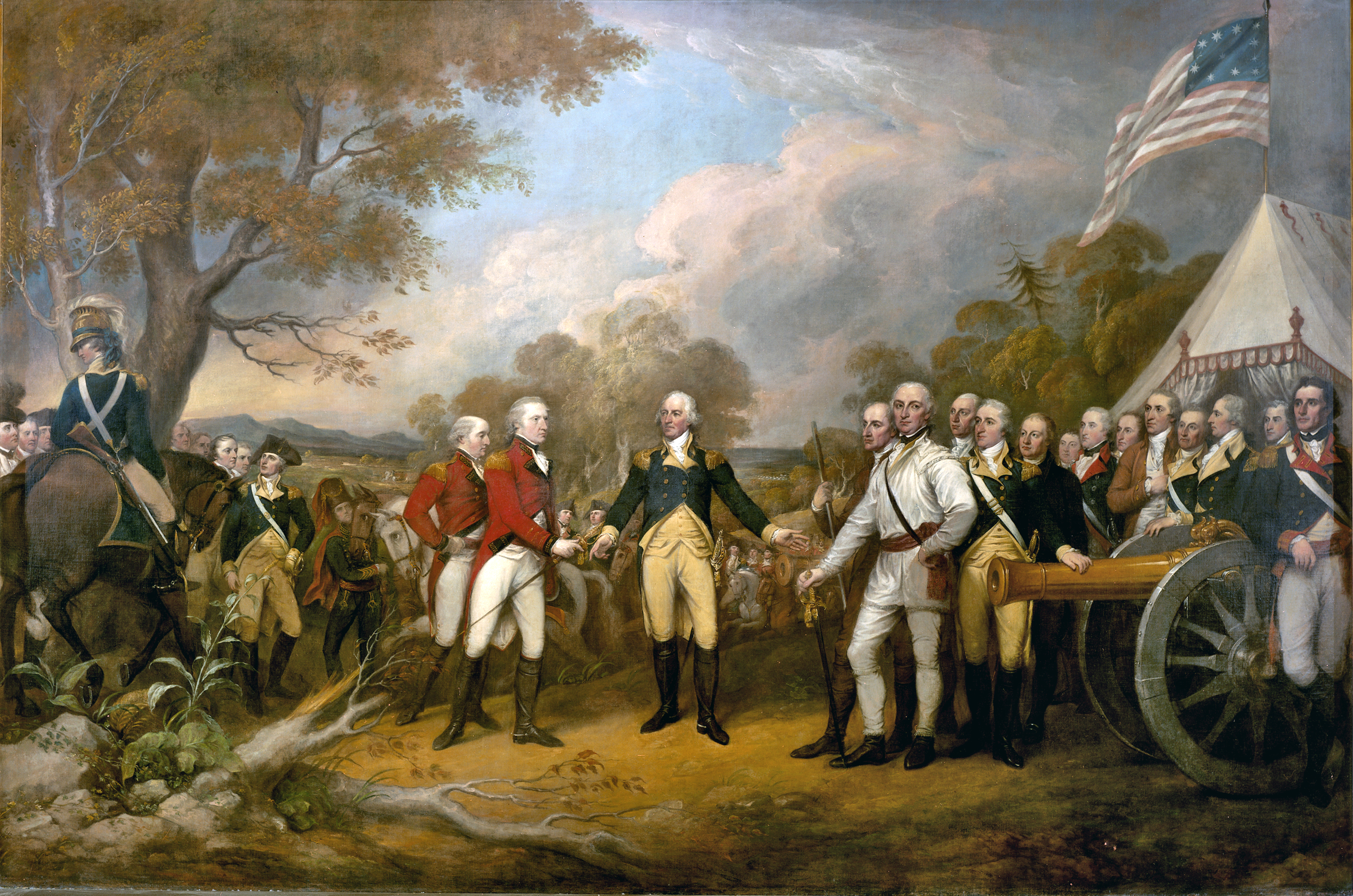
British general John Burgoyne shown surrendering at Saratoga (1777), Surrender of General Burgoyne painting by John Trumbull, 1822

During the 1760s and 1770s, relations between the Thirteen Colonies and Britain became strained, primarily because of anger against Parliament's attempts to tax American colonists without their consent. The Americans readied their large militias, but were short of gunpowder and artillery. The British assumed they could easily suppress Patriot resistance. In 1775 the American Revolutionary War began. In 1776 the Patriots expelled royal officials and declared the independence of the United States of America. After capturing a British invasion army in 1777, the new nation formed an alliance with France, equalizing the military and naval balance and putting Britain at risk of invasion from France. The British army controlled only a handful of coastal cities in the U.S. 1780–81 was a low point for Britain. Taxes and deficits were high, government corruption was pervasive, and the war in America was entering its sixth year with no end in sight. The Gordon Riots erupted in London during the spring of 1780, in response to increased concessions to Catholics by Parliament. In October 1781 Lord Cornwallis surrendered his army at Yorktown, Virginia. The Treaty of Paris was signed in 1783, formally terminating the war and recognising the independence of the US. The peace terms were generous to the new nation, which London hoped correctly would become a major trading partner.

==== Second British Empire ====
The loss of the Thirteen Colonies, at the time Britain's most populous, marked the transition between the "first" and "second" empires, in which Britain shifted its attention to Asia, the Pacific and later Africa. Adam Smith's The Wealth of Nations, published in 1776, had argued colonies were redundant, and free trade should replace the mercantilist policies of the first period of colonial expansion. The growth of trade between the newly independent United States and Britain after 1783 confirmed Smith's view that political control was not necessary for economic success.

During its first 100 years of operation, the focus of the British East India Company had been trade, not the building of an empire in India. Company interests turned from trade to territory during the 18th century as the Mughal Empire declined in power and the Company struggled with its French counterpart, the French East India Company, during the Carnatic wars of the 1740s and 1750s. The British, led by Robert Clive, defeated the French and their Indian allies in the Battle of Plassey, leaving the Company in control of Bengal and a major military and political power in India. It gradually increased the size of the territories under its control, either ruling directly or indirectly via local puppet rulers under the threat of force of the Indian Army, 80% of which was composed of native Indian sepoys.

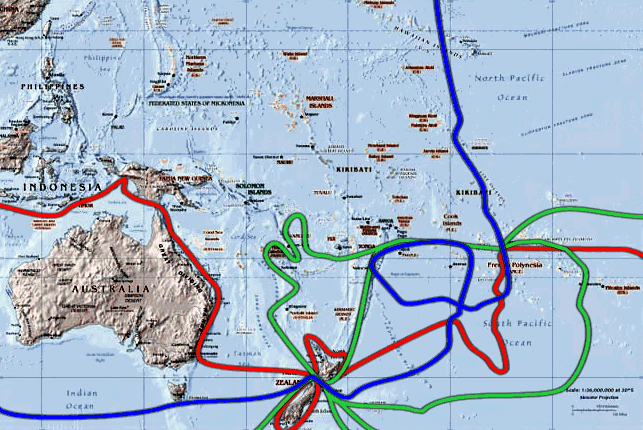
Voyages of the explorer James Cook

On 22 August 1770, James Cook discovered the eastern coast of Australia while on a scientific voyage to the South Pacific. In 1778, Joseph Banks, Cook's botanist on the voyage, presented evidence to the government on the suitability of Botany Bay for the establishment of a penal settlement, and in 1787 the first shipment of convicts set sail, arriving in 1788.

== 1800 to 1837 ==
=== Union with Ireland ===
The Flag of the United Kingdom is based on the flags of England, Scotland and the saltire of the Order of St Patrick (not the flag of Ireland).

On 1 January 1801, the Great Britain and Ireland joined to form the United Kingdom of Great Britain and Ireland. The legislative union of Great Britain and Ireland was brought about by the Act of Union 1800, creating the "United Kingdom of Great Britain and Ireland". The Act was passed in both the Parliament of Great Britain and the Parliament of Ireland, dominated by the Protestant Ascendancy and lacking representation of the catholic population. Substantial majorities were achieved, and this was assisted by bribery in the form of the awarding of peerages and honours to opponents to gain their votes.

Under the terms of the merger, the separate Parliaments of Great Britain and Ireland were abolished, and replaced by a united Parliament of the United Kingdom. Ireland thus became an integral part of the United Kingdom, sending around 100 MPs to the House of Commons at Westminster and 28 Irish representative peers to the House of Lords, elected by the Irish peers themselves, except that catholic peers were not permitted to take their seats in the Lords. Part of the trade-off for the Irish Catholics was to be the granting of Catholic emancipation, which had been fiercely resisted by the all-Anglican Irish Parliament. However, this was blocked by King George III, who argued that emancipating the Roman Catholics would breach his Coronation Oath. The Roman Catholic hierarchy had endorsed the Union. However the decision to block Catholic Emancipation fatally undermined the appeal of the Union.

=== Napoleonic wars ===
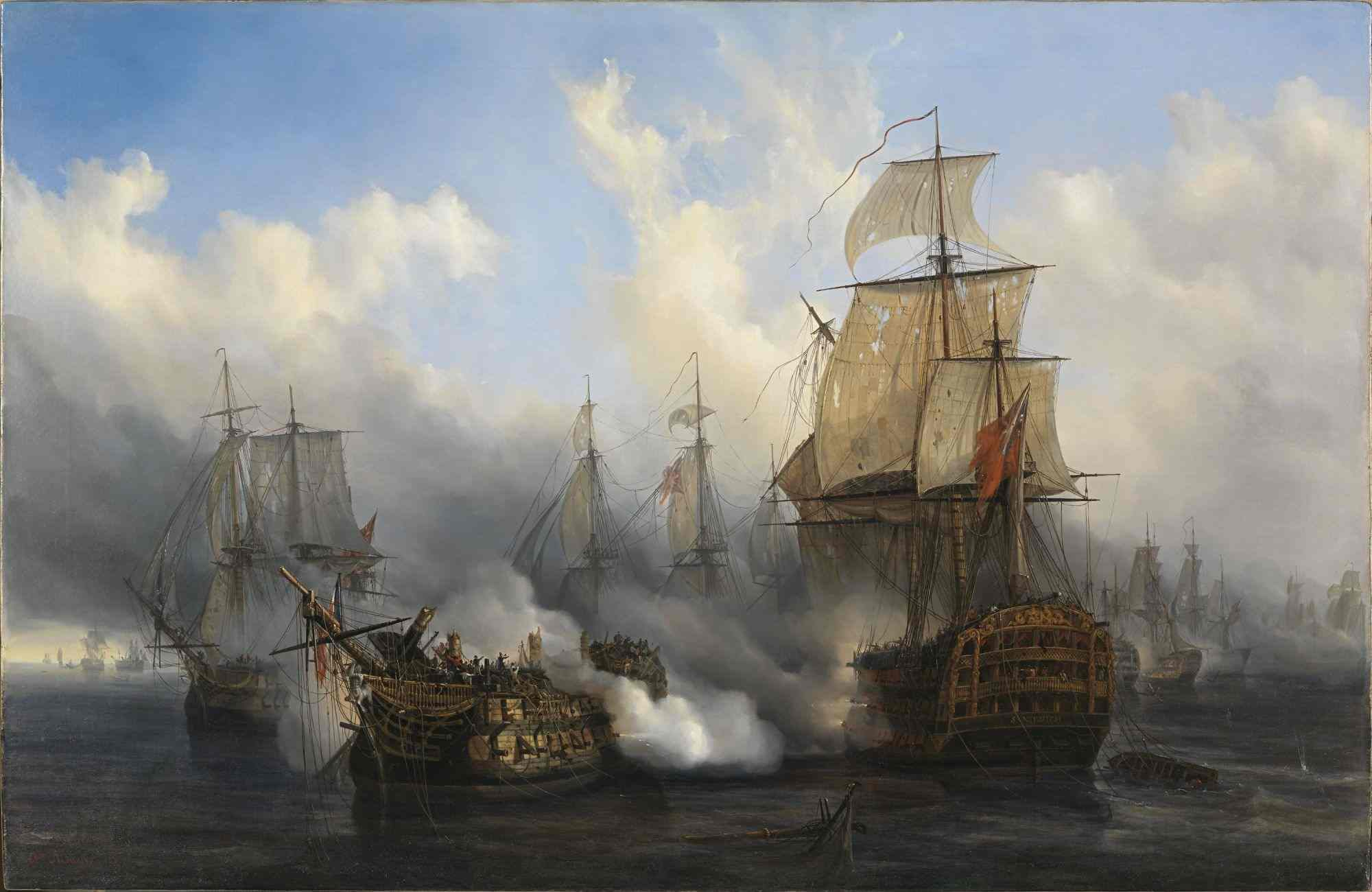
The British HMS Sandwich fires at the French flagship Bucentaure (completely dismasted) during the Battle of Trafalgar. The Bucentaure also fights HMS Victory (behind her) and HMS Temeraire (left side of the picture). In fact, HMS Sandwich never fought at Trafalgar; a mistake by Auguste Mayer, the painter.

At the start of the 19th century, Britain was challenged again by France under Napoleon, in a struggle that, unlike previous wars, represented a contest of ideologies between the two nations: the constitutional monarchy of Great Britain versus the liberal principles of the French Revolution ostensibly championed by the Napoleonic empire. It was not only Britain's position on the world stage that was threatened: Napoleon threatened invasion of Britain, and with it, a fate similar to the countries of continental Europe that his armies had overrun.

During the War of the Second Coalition, Britain occupied most of the French and Dutch colonies, but tropical diseases claimed the lives of over 40,000 troops. When the Treaty of Amiens created a pause, Britain was forced to return most of the colonies. In May 1803, war was declared again. Napoleon's plans to invade Britain failed due to the inferiority of his navy, and in 1805, Nelson's fleet decisively defeated the French and Spanish at Trafalgar, which was the last significant naval action of the Napoleonic Wars.

In 1806, Napoleon issued the series of Berlin Decrees, which brought into effect the Continental System. This policy aimed to weaken the British export economy closing French-controlled territory to its trade. Napoleon hoped that isolating Britain from the Continent would end its economic dominance. It never succeeded in its objective. There was some damage to Britain, but its control of the oceans helped ameliorate the damage. Even more damage was done to the economies of France and its allies, which lost a useful trading partner. Angry governments gained an incentive to ignore the Continental System, which led to the weakening of Napoleon's coalition. Britain possessed the greatest industrial capacity in Europe, and its mastery of the seas allowed it to build up economic strength through trade to its possessions from its rapidly expanding new Empire. Britain's naval supremacy meant that France could never enjoy the peace necessary to consolidate its control over Europe, and it could threaten neither the home islands nor the main British colonies.

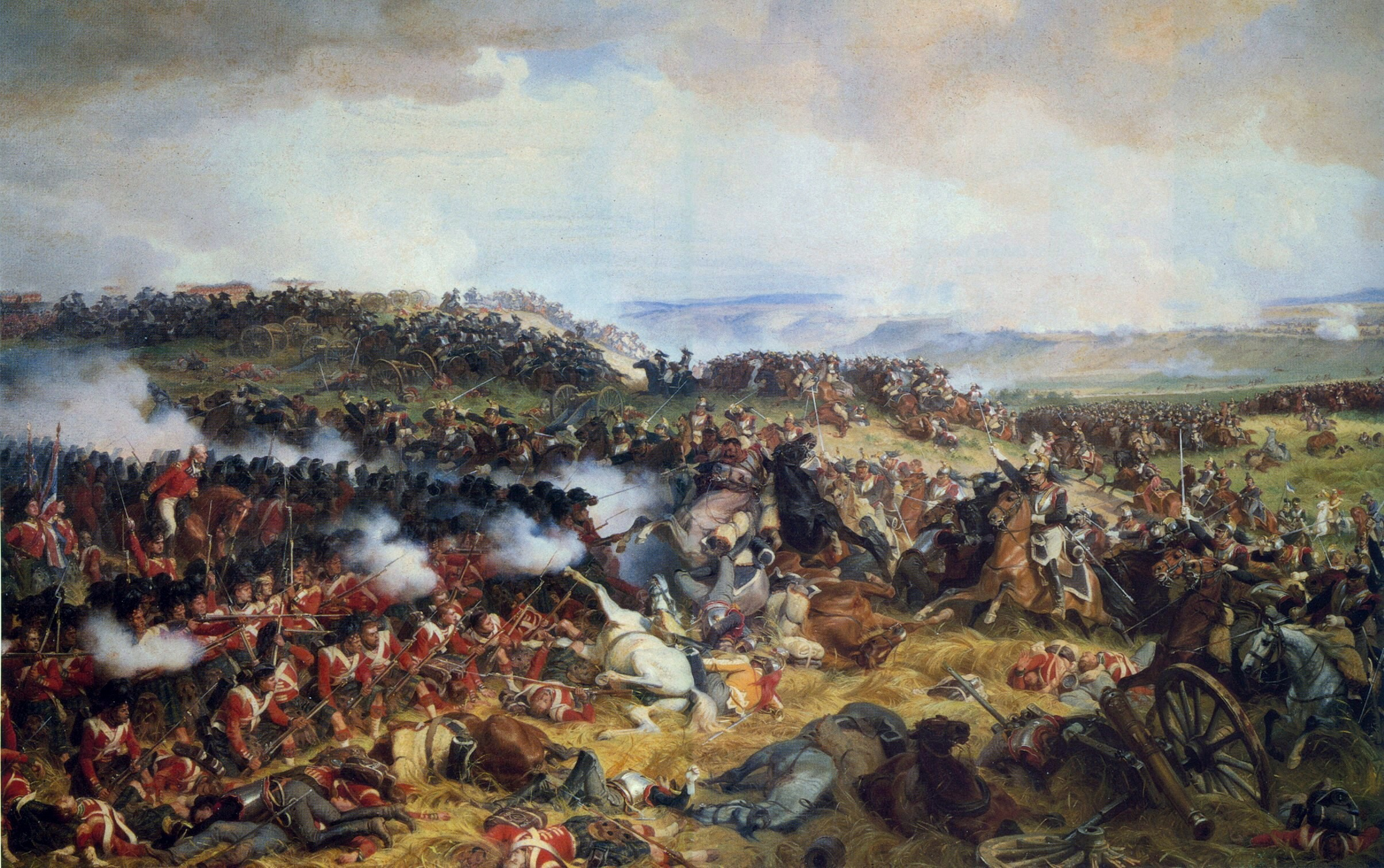
The charge of the French Cuirassiers at the Battle of Waterloo against a British infantry square

The Dos de Mayo Uprising permitted Britain to gain a foothold on the Continent. The Duke of Wellington and his army of British and Portuguese pushed the French out of Spain and in early 1814, as Napoleon was being driven back in the east by the Prussians, Austrians, and Russians, Wellington invaded southern France. After Napoleon's surrender and exile to the island of Elba, peace appeared to have returned, but when he escaped back into France in 1815, the British and their allies had to fight him again. The armies of Wellington and von Blücher defeated Napoleon once and for all at Waterloo.

==== Financing the war ====
A key element in British success was its ability to mobilize industrial and financial resources and apply them to defeating France. With a population of 16 million Britain was barely half the size of France with 30 million. In terms of soldiers the French numerical advantage was offset by British subsidies that paid for a large proportion of the Austrian and Russian soldiers, peaking at about 450,000 in 1813. Most important, the British national output remained strong and the well-organised business sector channeled products into what the military needed. The system of smuggling finished products into the continent undermined French efforts to ruin the British economy by cutting off markets. The British budget in 1814 reached £66 million, including £10 million for the Navy, £40 million for the Army, £10 million for the Allies, and £38 million as interest on the national debt. The national debt soared to £679 million, more than double the GDP. It was supported by hundreds of thousands of investors and tax payers, despite the higher taxes on land and a new income tax. The cost of the war came to £830 million. By contrast the French financial system was inadequate and Napoleon had to rely in part on requisitions from conquered lands.

==== War of 1812 with United States ====
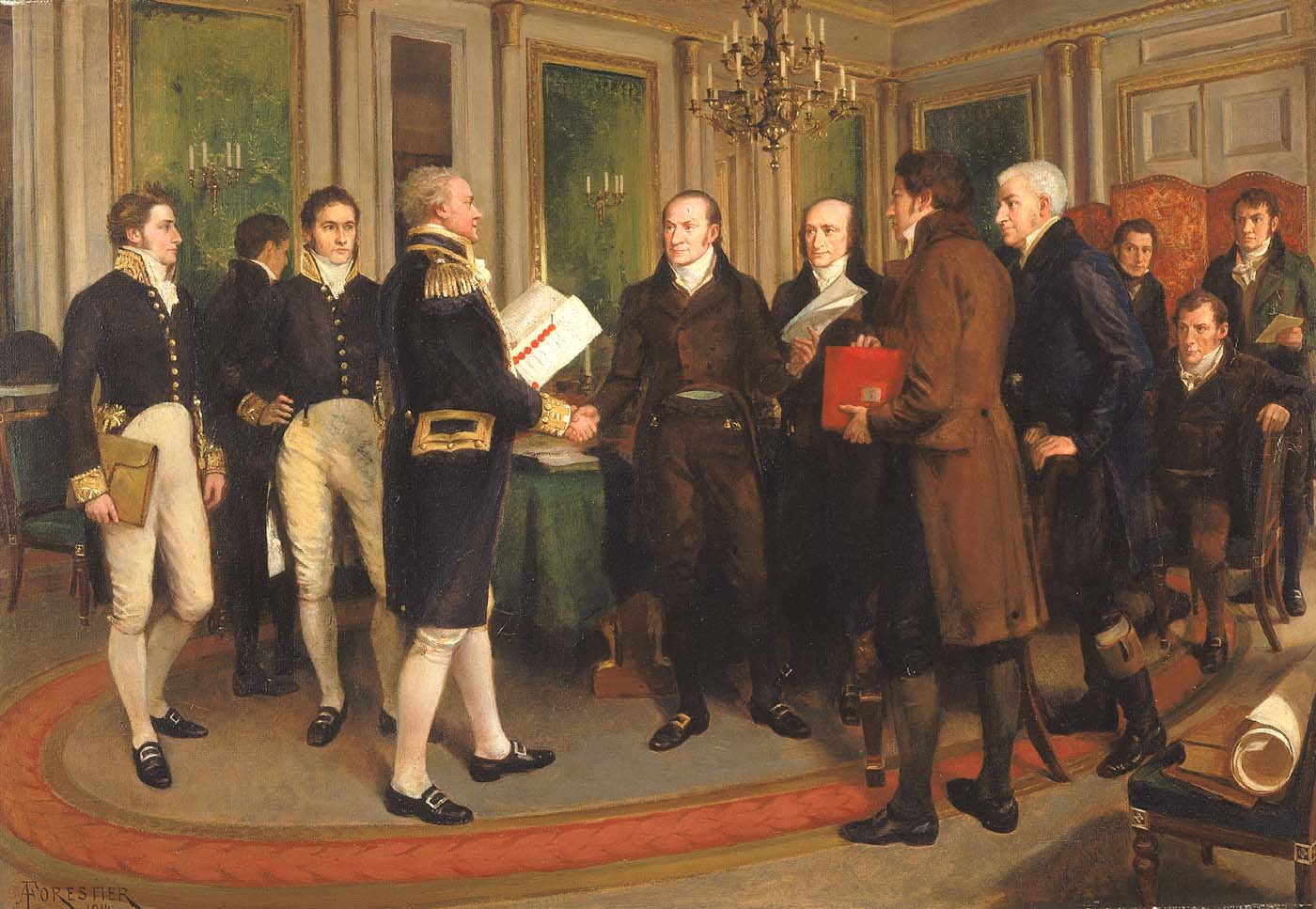
Signing of the Treaty of Ghent (December 1814) with the U.S. diplomats

Simultaneous with the Napoleonic Wars, trade disputes and British impressment of American sailors led to the War of 1812. This was the "Second War of Independence" for the Americans, though it was never about British efforts to conquer the former colonies, but the conquest of the Canadian colonies by the Americans. The British could devote few resources to the conflict until the fall of Napoleon in 1814. American frigates inflicted defeats on the British navy, which was short on manpower due to the conflict in Europe. A stepped-up war effort brought about some successes such as the burning of Washington, but many influential voices such as the Duke of Wellington argued that an outright victory over the US was impossible.

Peace was agreed to at the end of 1814, but Andrew Jackson, unaware of this, won a great victory over the British at the Battle of New Orleans in January 1815. Ratification of the Treaty of Ghent ended the war in February 1815. The major result was the permanent defeat of the Indian allies the British had counted upon. The US-Canada border was demilitarised by both countries, and peaceful trade resumed, although worries of an American conquest of Canada persisted.

=== Postwar repression by reactionary landed elites ===
The postwar era was a time of economic depression, poor harvests, growing inflation, and high unemployment among returning soldiers. As industrialisation progressed, Britain was more urban and less rural, and power shifted accordingly. The dominant Tory leadership, based in the declining rural sector, was fearful, reactionary and repressive. Tories feared the emergence of radicals conspiring to emulate the dreaded French Revolution. In reality the violent radical element was small and weak; there were small conspiracies involving men with few followers and careless security; they were quickly suppressed. Techniques of repression included the suspension of Habeas Corpus in 1817 (allowing the government to hold suspects without cause or trial). Sidmouth's Gagging Acts of 1817 heavily muzzled the opposition newspapers; the reformers switched to pamphlets and sold 50,000 a week. In reaction to the Peterloo Massacre of 1819, the Liverpool government passed the "Six Acts" in 1819. They prohibited drills and military exercises; facilitated warrants for the search for weapons; outlawed public meetings of more than 50 people; put heavy penalties on blasphemous and seditious publications; imposing a fourpenny stamp act on many pamphlets to cut down the flow on criticism. Offenders could be harshly punished including exile to Australia. The laws were designed to deter troublemakers and reassure conservatives; they were not often used. By the end of the 1820s, along with an economic recovery, many of these repressive laws were repealed.

=== Weak monarchs ===
George IV was a weak ruler as regent (1811–1820) and king (1820–1830). He let his ministers take full charge of government affairs, playing a far lesser role than George III. The principle now became established that the king accepts as prime minister the person who wins a majority in the House of Commons, whether the king personally favours them. His governments, with little help from the king, presided over victory in the Napoleonic Wars, negotiated the peace settlement, and attempted to deal with the social and economic malaise that followed. His brother William IV ruled 1830-37, but was little involved in politics. His reign saw reforms: the poor law was updated, child labour restricted, slavery abolished in nearly all the British Empire, and, most important, the Reform Act 1832 refashioned the British electoral system.

=== Foreign affairs ===
There were no major wars until the Crimean War of 1853–56. While Prussia, Austria, and Russia, as absolute monarchies, tried to suppress liberalism wherever it might occur, the British came to terms with new ideas. Britain intervened in Portugal in 1826 to defend a constitutional government there and recognising the independence of Spain's American colonies in 1824. British merchants and financiers, and later railway builders, played major roles in the economies of Latin American nations. The British intervened in 1827 on the side of the Greeks, who had been waging the Greek War of Independence against the Ottoman Empire since 1821.

=== Whig reforms of the 1830s ===
The Whig Party recovered its strength and unity by supporting moral reforms, especially of the electoral system, the abolition of slavery and emancipation of the Catholics. Catholic emancipation was secured in the Roman Catholic Relief Act 1829, which removed the most substantial restrictions on Roman Catholics in Britain.

The Whigs became champions of Parliamentary reform. They made Lord Grey prime minister 1830–34, and the Reform Act 1832 became their signature measure. It broadened the franchise slightly and ended the system of rotten and pocket boroughs (where elections were controlled by powerful families), and gave seats to new industrial centres. The aristocracy continued to dominate the government, the Army and Royal Navy, and high society. After parliamentary investigations demonstrated the horrors of child labour, limited reforms were passed in 1833.

Chartism emerged after the 1832 Reform Act failed to give the vote to the working class. Activists denounced the 'betrayal' and the 'sacrificing' of their interests by the 'misconduct' of the government. In 1838, Chartists issued the People's Charter demanding manhood suffrage, equal sized election districts, voting by ballots, payment of MPs (so poor men could serve), annual Parliaments, and abolition of property requirements. The Chartists were unable to force serious constitutional debate. Historians see Chartism as a continuation of the 18th-century fight against corruption and a new stage in demands for democracy in an industrial society. In 1832, Parliament abolished slavery in the Empire with the Slavery Abolition Act 1833. The government purchased the slaves for £20,000,000, and freed the slaves, especially those in the Caribbean sugar islands.

== Victorian era ==
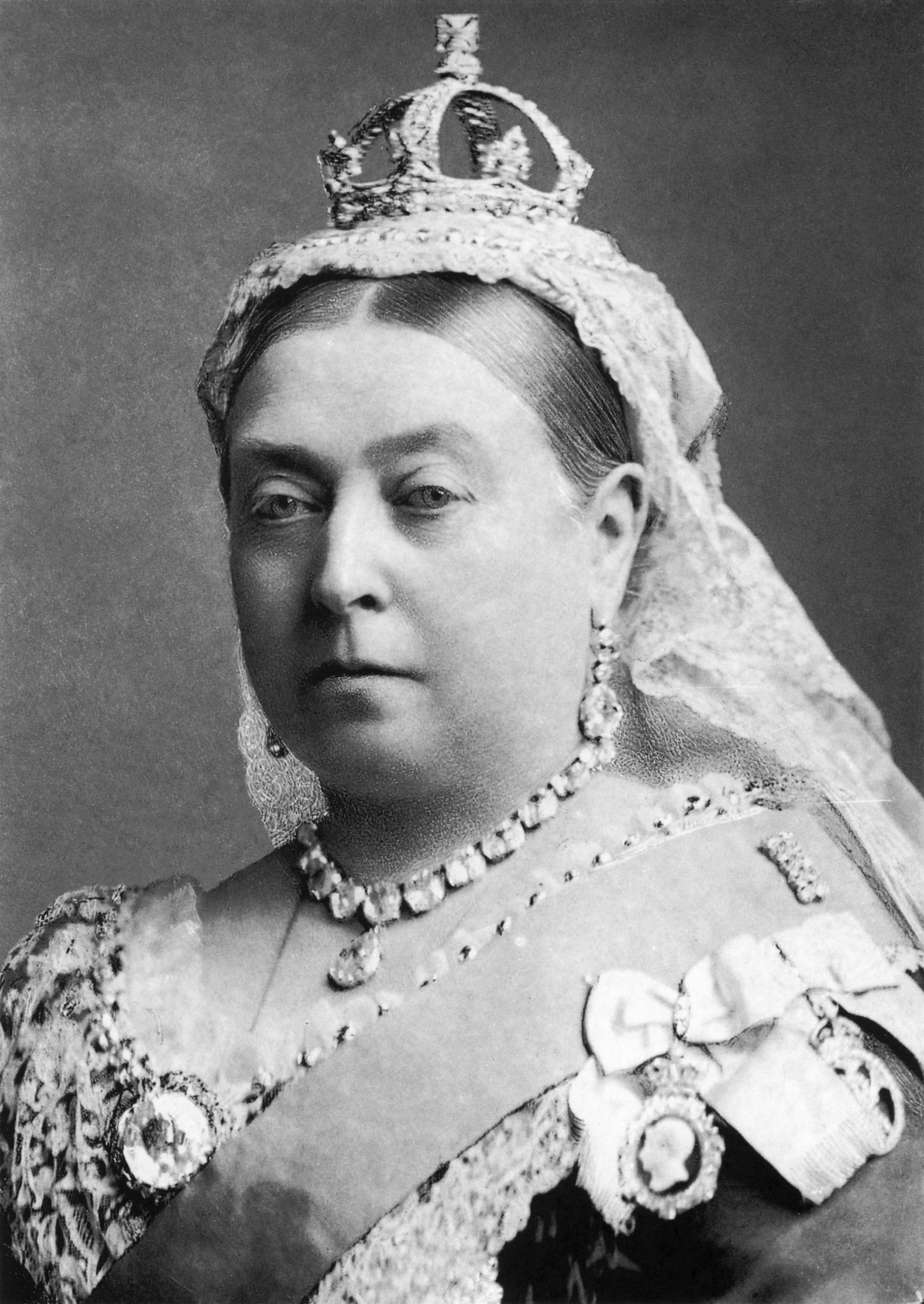
Queen Victoria (1837–1901)

Queen Victoria ascended the throne in 1837, aged 18. Her long reign until 1901 saw Britain reach the zenith of its economic and political power. Exciting new technologies such as steam ships, railways, photography, and telegraphs appeared, making the world faster-paced. Britain remained mostly inactive in Continental politics, and it was not affected by the wave of revolutions in 1848. The Victorian era saw the fleshing out of the second British Empire. The era was preceded by the Georgian era and succeeded by the Edwardian era.

Historians like Bernard Porter have characterised the mid-Victorian era, (1850–1870) as Britain's 'Golden Years'. There was peace and prosperity, as the national income per person grew by half. Much of the prosperity was due to the increasing industrialisation, especially in textiles and machinery, as well as to the worldwide network of trade and engineering that produce profits for British merchants and experts from across the globe. There was peace abroad, and social peace at home. Reforms in industrial conditions were set by Parliament. The Mines and Collieries Act 1842 banned employment of girls and boys under ten years old from working underground in coal mines. The Chartist movement, peaked as a democratic movement among the working class in 1848; its leaders moved to other pursuits, such as trade unions and cooperative societies. The working class ignored foreign agitators like Karl Marx in their midst, and joined in celebrating the new prosperity. Employers typically were paternalistic, and generally recognised the trade unions. Companies provided their employees with welfare services ranging from housing, schools and churches, to libraries, baths, and gymnasia. Middle-class reformers did their best to assist the working classes aspire to middle-class norms of 'respectability.'

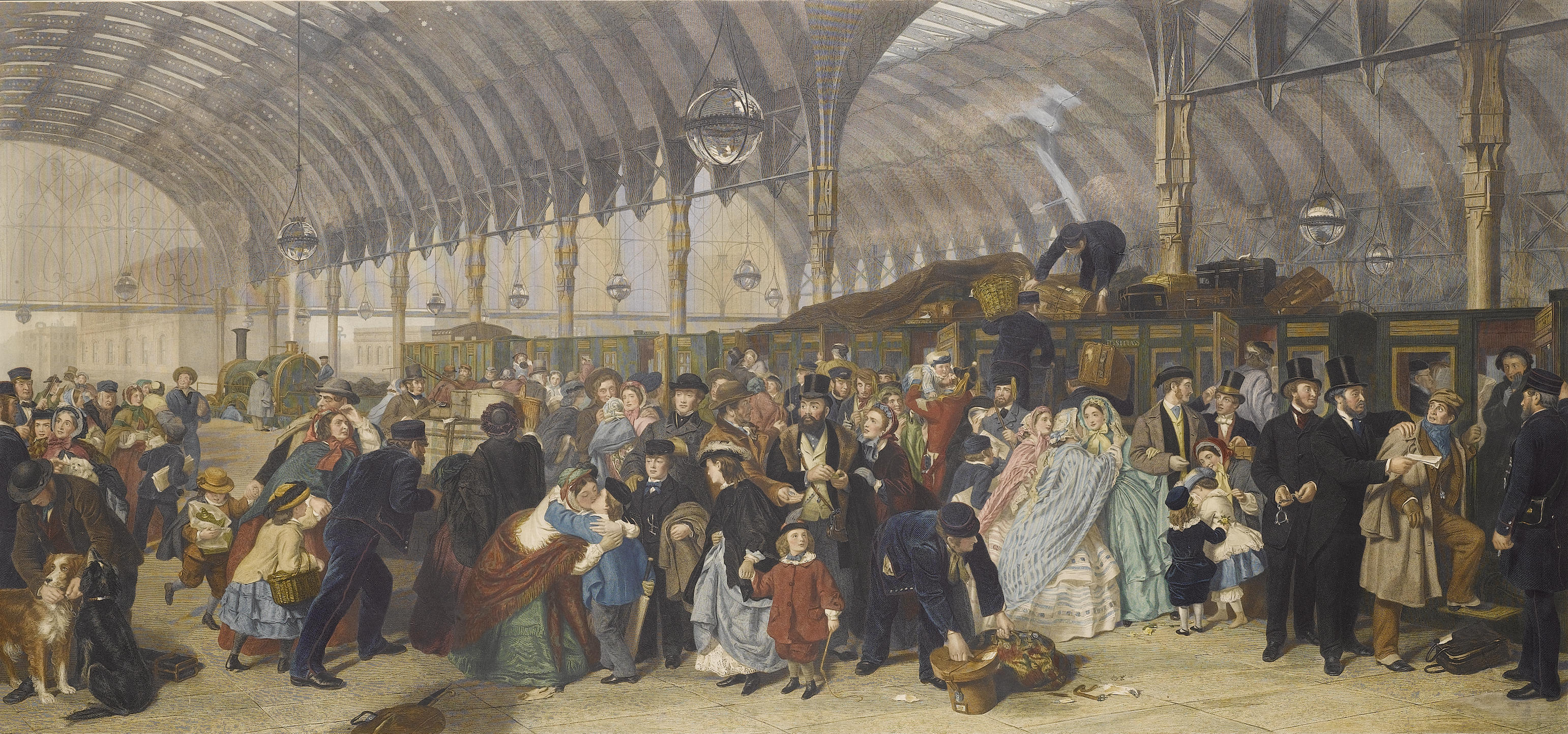
Frith's depiction of Paddington railway station in London

Taxes were very low, and government restrictions were minimal. There were still problem areas, such as riots, especially those motivated by anti-Catholicism. Society was still ruled by the aristocracy and the gentry, which controlled high government offices, both houses of Parliament, the church, and the military. Becoming a rich businessman was not as prestigious as inheriting a title and owning a landed estate. Literature was doing well, but the fine arts languished as the Great Exhibition of 1851 showcased Britain's industrial prowess rather than its sculpture, painting or music. The educational system was mediocre. Historian Llewellyn Woodward has concluded:

For leisure or work, for getting or spending, England was a better country in 1879 than in 1815. The scales were less weighted against the weak, against women and children, and against the poor. There was greater movement, and less of the fatalism of an earlier age. The public conscience was more instructed, and the content of liberty was being widened to include something more than freedom from political constraint.... Yet England in 1871 was by no means an earthly paradise. The housing and conditions of life of the working class in town & country were still a disgrace to an age of plenty.

According to historians David Brandon and Alan Brooke, the new system of railways after 1830 brought into being our modern world:

Excelling in the bulk movement of coal, they provided the fuel for the furnaces of industry and for domestic fireplaces. Millions of people were able to travel who had scarcely ever travelled before. Railways enabled mail, newspapers, periodicals and cheap literature to be distributed easily, quickly and cheaply allowing a much wider and faster dissemination of ideas and information. They had a significant impact on improving diet... They employed huge quantities of labour both directly and indirectly. They helped Britain to become the 'Workshop of the World' by reducing transport costs not only of raw materials but of finished goods, large amounts of which were exported.... Today's global corporations originated with the great limited liability railway companies.... By the third quarter of the nineteenth century, there was scarcely any person living in Britain whose life had not been altered in some way by the coming of the railways. Railways contributed to the transformation of Britain from a rural to a predominantly urban society.

=== Foreign policy ===
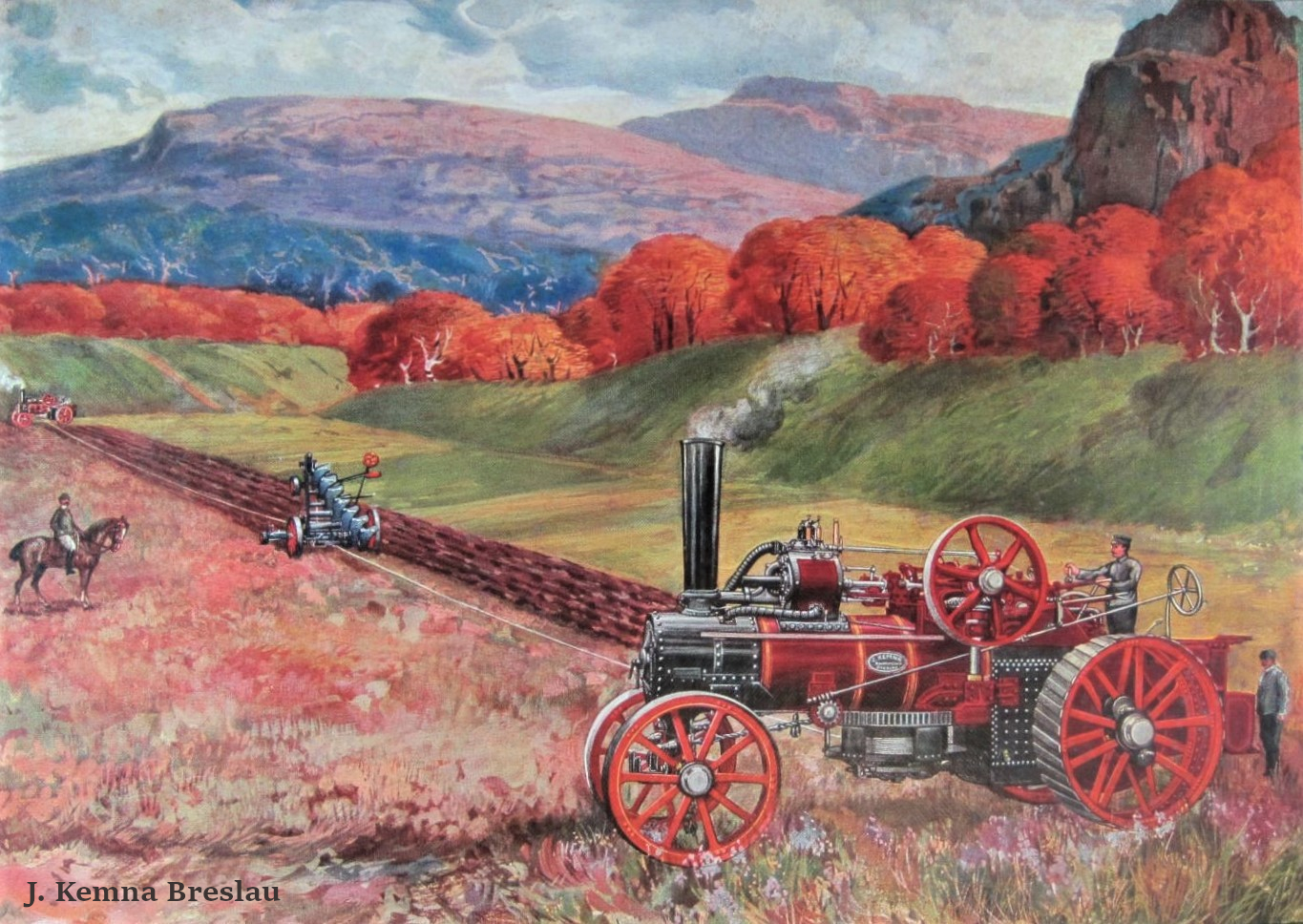
Many European companies, such as steam-machine producer J. Kemna, modeled themselves on English industry.

The Great London Exhibition of 1851 clearly demonstrated Britain's dominance in engineering and industry; that lasted until the rise of the US and Germany in the 1890s. Using the imperial tools of free trade and financial investment, it exerted major influence on many countries outside Europe, especially in Latin America and Asia. Thus Britain had both a formal Empire based on British rule and an informal one based on the British pound.

In 1867, Britain united most of its North American colonies as Canada, giving it self-government. Britain handled foreign policy and defence. The second half of the 19th century saw a major expansion of Britain's colonial empire in Asia and Africa as well as the Pacific. In the "Scramble for Africa", the boast was having the Union Jack flying from "Cairo to Cape Town." Britain defended its empire with the world's dominant navy, and a small professional army. It was the only power in Europe to have no conscription. The rise of the German Empire after 1871 posed a new challenge, for it threatened to take Britain's place as the world's foremost industrial power.

=== Ireland and Home Rule ===
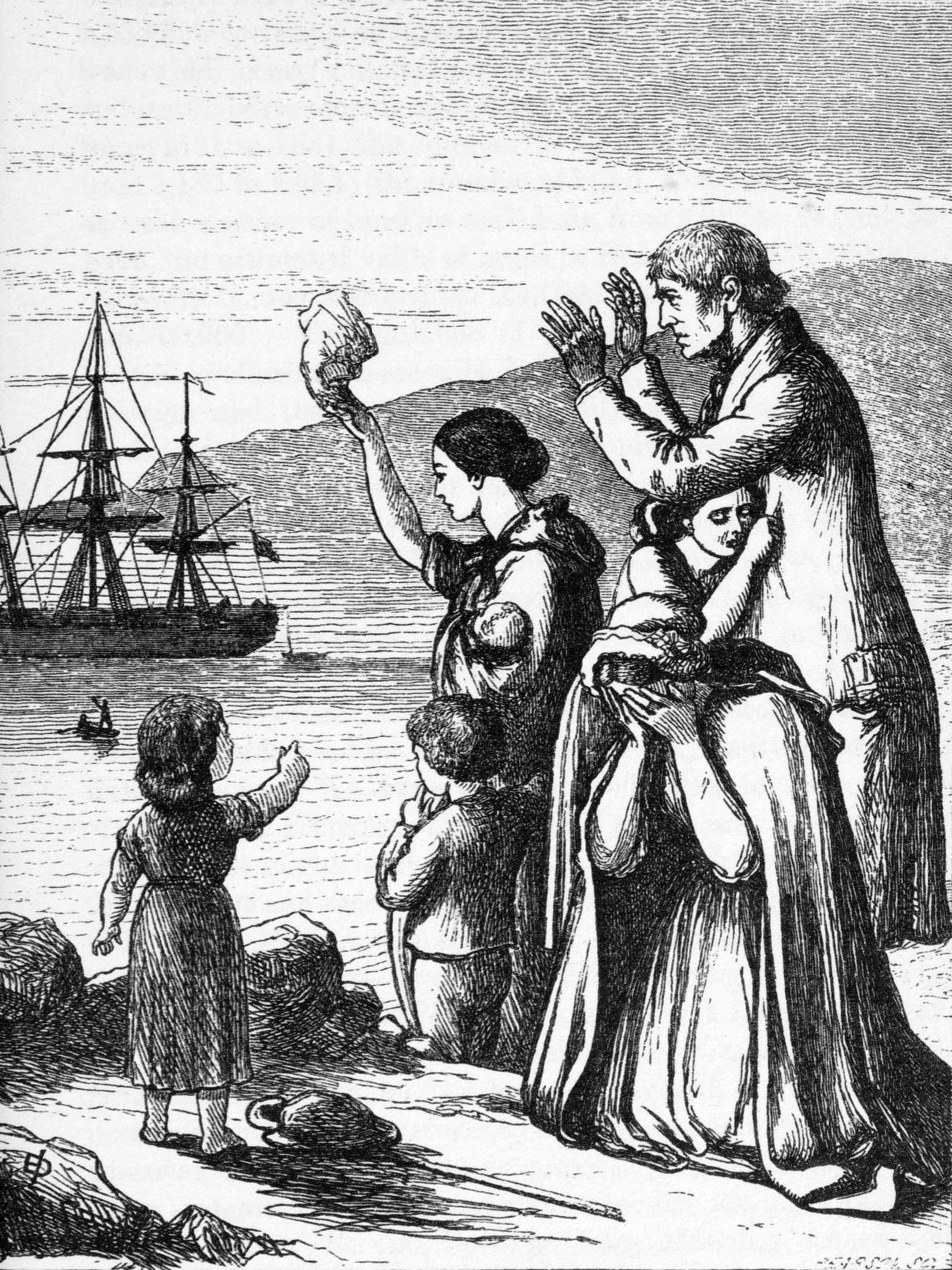
Emigrants Leave Ireland depicting the emigration to America following the Great Famine in Ireland

Part of the agreement which led to the Acts of Union 1800 stipulated that the Penal Laws in Ireland were to be repealed and Catholic emancipation granted. However, King George III blocked emancipation. A campaign under Daniel O'Connell led to the concession of Catholic Emancipation in 1829, allowing Catholics to sit in Parliament.

When potato blight hit Ireland in 1846, much of the rural population was left without food. Relief efforts were inadequate and hundreds of thousands died in the Great Hunger. Millions more migrated to England, or to North America. In the 1870s new moderate nationalist movement was formed. As the Irish Parliamentary Party it became a major factor in parliament under Charles Stewart Parnell. Home Rule Bills introduced by Liberal Prime Minister Gladstone failed of passage, and split the Liberals. A significant unionist minority, opposed Home Rule, fearing that a Catholic-Nationalist parliament in Dublin would discriminate against them and hurt its industry.

=== Leadership ===
Historically, the aristocracy was divided between Conservatives and Liberals. However, when Gladstone committed to home rule for Ireland, Britain's upper classes largely abandoned the Liberal party, giving the Conservatives a large permanent majority in the House of Lords. High Society in London, following the Queen, largely ostracised home rulers, and Liberal clubs were badly split. Joseph Chamberlain took a major element of upper-class supporters out of the Party and into a third party, the Liberal Unionists, which collaborated with and eventually merged into the Conservative party. The Gladstonian liberals in 1891 adopted the Newcastle Programme that included home rule for Ireland, disestablishment of the Church of England in Wales and Scotland, tighter controls on the sale of liquor, major extension of factory regulation, and democratic political reforms. The Programme had a strong appeal to the Nonconformist middle-class Liberal element, which felt liberated by the departure of the aristocracy.

== Early 20th century (1901–1918) ==
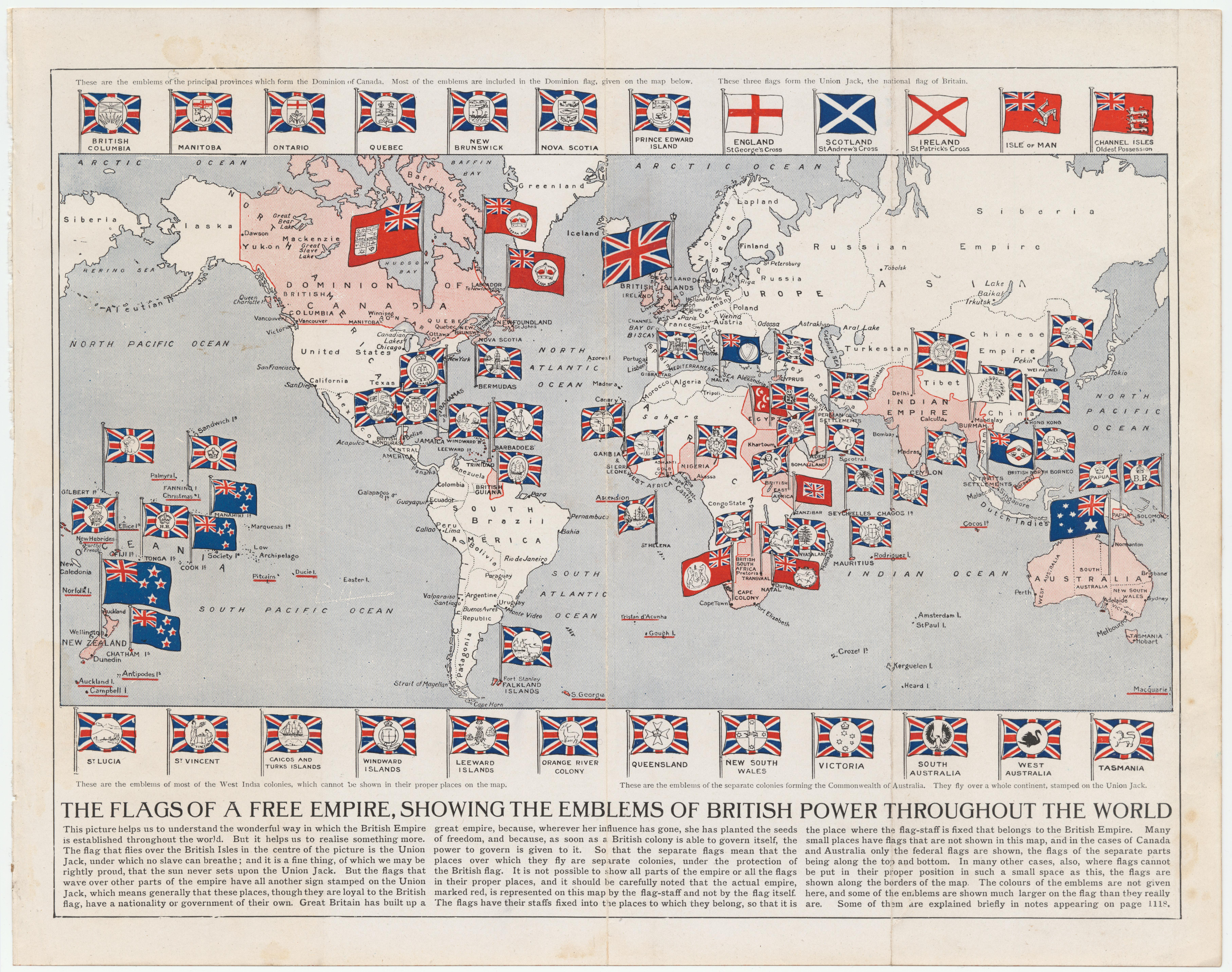
During the 19th and early 20th centuries, the United Kingdom was a superpower.

The Liberal Party was in power from 1906 to 1915, when it formed a wartime coalition. It passed the welfare reforms that created a basic British welfare state. It weakened the veto power of Lords, blocked woman suffrage. In 1914 it apparently "solved" the problem of Irish Home Rule, but when the war broke out the solution was shelved. H. H. Asquith was Liberal Prime Minister between 1908 and 1916, followed by David Lloyd George, 1916–1922. Although Asquith was the Party leader, the dominant Liberal was Lloyd George. Asquith was overwhelmed by the wartime role of coalition prime minister, and Lloyd George replaced him as the coalition prime minister in 1916 but Asquith remained Liberal party leader. The two fought for years over control of the party, badly weakening it in the process. Historian Martin Pugh in The Oxford Companion to British History argues that Lloyd George:

made a greater impact on British public life than any other 20th-century leader, thanks to his pre-war introduction of Britain's social welfare system (especially medical insurance, unemployment insurance, and...pensions...paid for by taxes on high incomes and on the land). ...he played a leading role in winning the First World War, redrawing the map of Europe at the peace conference, and partitioning Ireland.

=== Edwardian era 1901–1914 ===
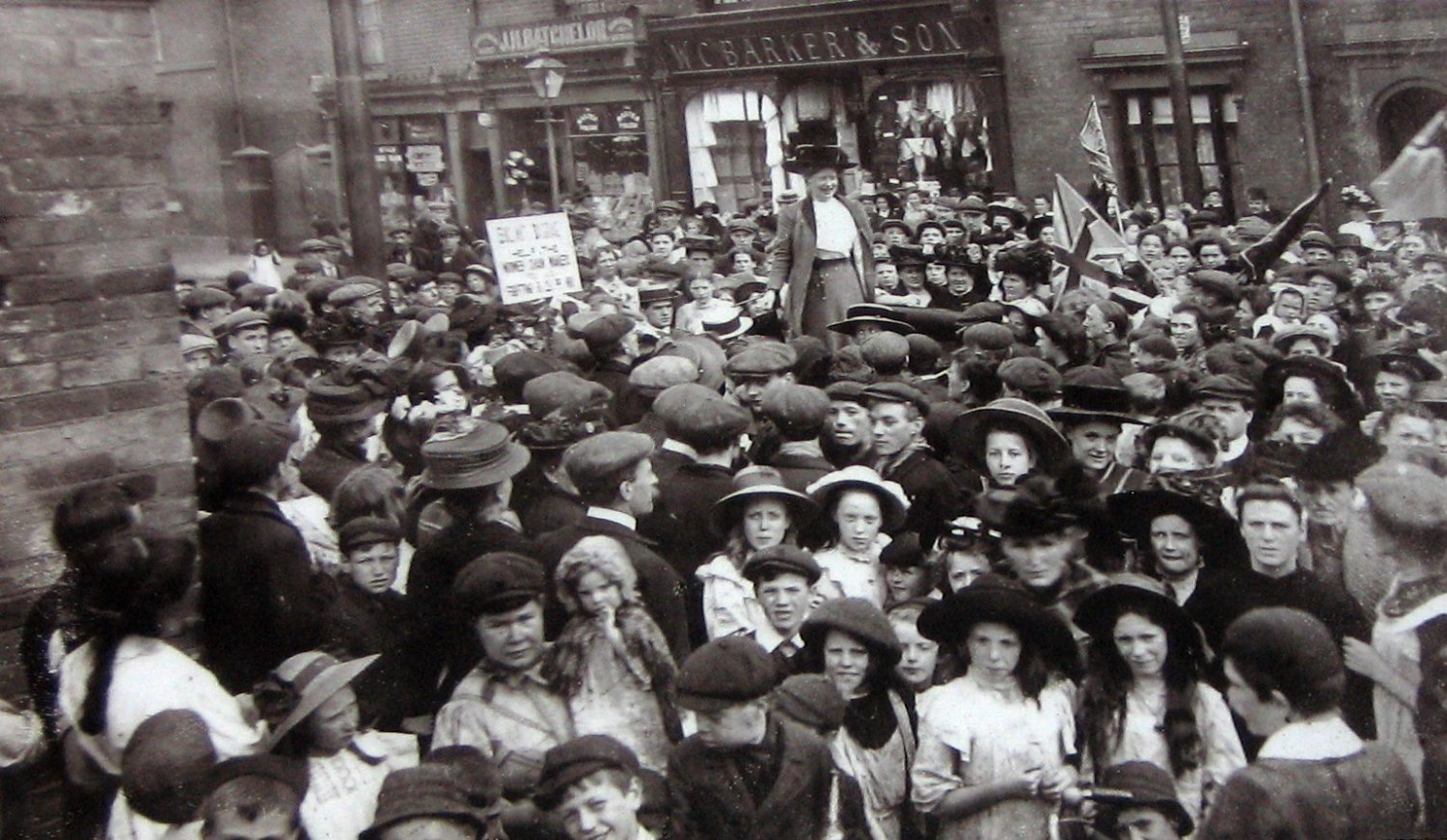
Mary Macarthur addressing the crowds during the chain makers' strike, Cradley Heath, 1910

Queen Victoria died in 1901 and her son Edward VII became king, inaugurating the Edwardian Era, which was characterised by ostentatious displays of wealth in contrast to the sombre Victorian Era. With the advent of the 20th century, things such as motion pictures, automobiles, and aeroplanes were coming into use. The new century was characterised by a feeling of optimism. The social reforms of the last century continued with the Labour Party being formed in 1900. Edward died in 1910, to be succeeded by George V, who reigned 1910–1936. Scandal-free, hard working and popular, George V was the British monarch who, with Queen Mary, established the modern pattern of conduct for British royalty, based on middle-class values and virtues.

The era was prosperous but political crises were escalating out of control. George Dangerfield (1935) identified the "strange death of liberal England" as the multiple crises that hit in 1910–1914 with serious social and political instability arising from the Irish crisis, labour unrest, the women's suffrage movements, and partisan and constitutional struggles in Parliament. At one point it even seemed the Army might refuse orders dealing with Northern Ireland. No solution appeared, when the unexpected outbreak of the Great War in 1914 put domestic issues on hold. Ross McKibbin argues that the political party system of the Edwardian era was in delicate balance on the eve of the war. The Liberals were in power with a progressive alliance of Labour and, off and on, Irish Nationalists. The coalition was committed to free trade (as opposed to the high tariffs the Conservatives sought), free collective bargaining for trades unions, an active social policy that was forging the welfare state, and constitutional reform to reduce the power of the House of Lords. The coalition lacked a long-term plan, because it was cobbled together. The sociological basis was non-Anglican religion and non-English ethnicity rather than the emerging class conflict emphasised by Labour.

=== First World War ===
In August 1914, Britain declared war on Germany and Austria. The cabinet's reasons focused on a commitment to France and avoidance of splitting the Liberal Party. Top Liberals led by Prime Minister H. H. Asquith and Foreign Secretary Edward Grey threatened to resign if the cabinet refused to support France. That would split the party and mean loss of control of the government to a coalition or Unionist (i.e. Conservative) opposition. However, the large antiwar element among Liberals, with David Lloyd George as spokesperson, would support the war to honour the Treaty of London (1839) that guaranteed Belgian neutrality. So Belgium rather than France was the public reason given.

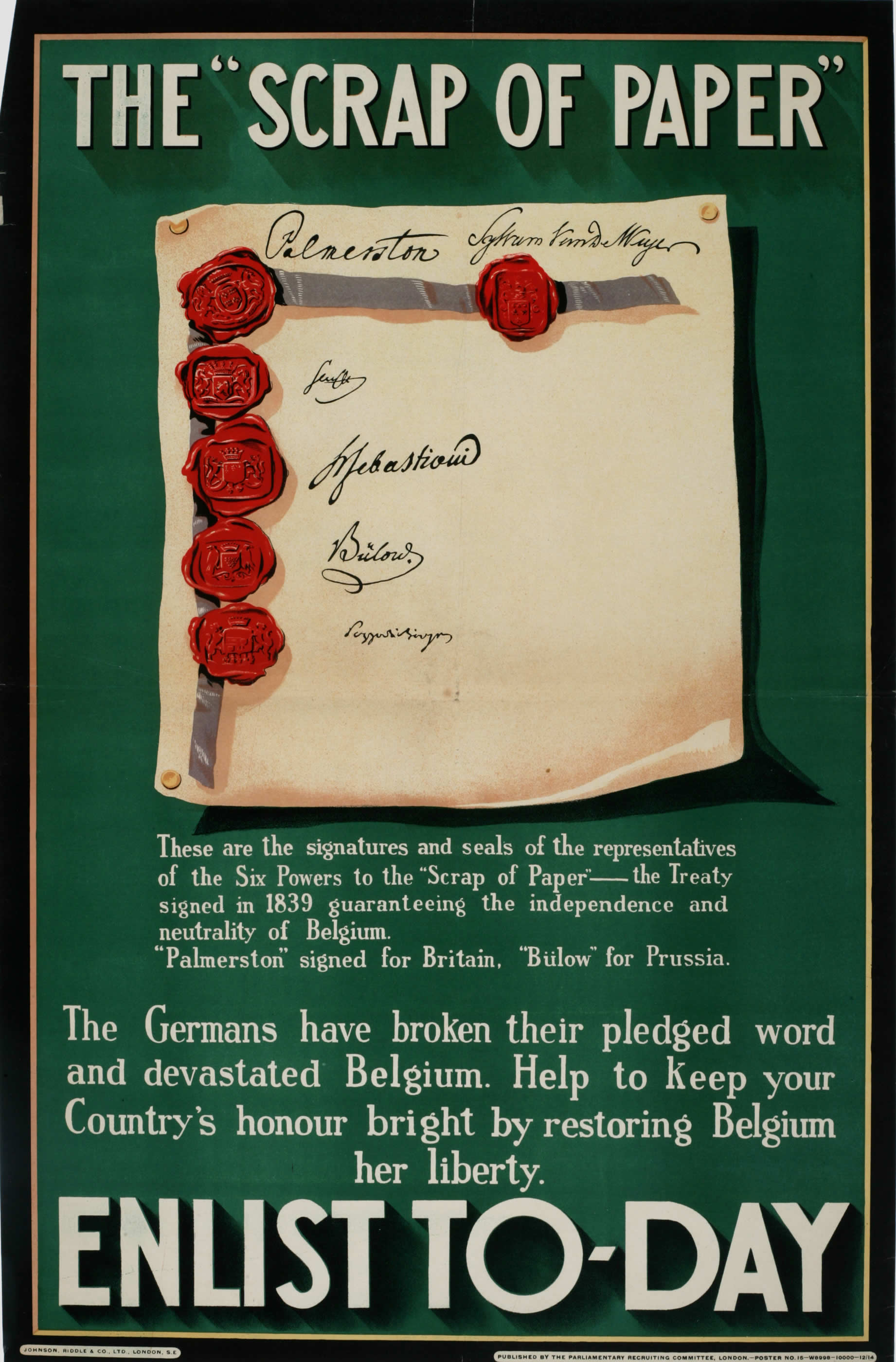
"The Scrap of Paper – Enlist Today", a 1914 British propaganda poster, emphasizes German contempt for the 1839 treaty that guaranteed Belgian neutrality as merely a "scrap of paper" that Germany would ignore.

France had entered to support Russia, which in turn had entered to support Serbia. Britain became part of the Triple Entente with France and Russia, which fought the Central Powers of Germany, Austria and the Ottoman Empire. The Western Front turned into a killing ground in which millions died but no army made a large advance. The main British contribution was financial—loans and grants helped Russia, Italy and smaller allies afford the war.

The stalemate required extensive supply of men and munitions. By 1916, volunteering fell off, the government imposed conscription (but not in Ireland) to keep up the strength of the Army. With his slow start and mobilisation of resources, Asquith had proven inadequate. Asquith was replaced in December 1916 with the more effective David Lloyd George. He had strong support from Unionists and considerable backing of Labour, as well as a majority of his Liberal Party. Lloyd George answered the demands for a more decisive government by setting up a small war cabinet, a cabinet secretariat under Maurice Hankey, and a secretariat of private advisors in 'The Garden Suburb'.

Irish Nationalist opinion was divided: some served in the British Army, but the Irish Republican Brotherhood plotted an Easter Rising in 1916. It quickly failed but the brutal repression that followed turned that element against Britain, as did failed plans to introduce conscription in Ireland in 1917.

The nation mobilised its population, industry, finances, Empire and diplomacy, in league with France and the US, to defeat the Central Powers. The British Army had never been a large employer, with the regular army standing at 250,000 at the start of the war. By 1918, there were about five million in the army and the fledgling Royal Air Force, was about the same size of the pre-war army. The economy grew 14% from 1914 to 1918 despite the absence of so many men in the services; by contrast the German economy shrank 27%. The war saw a decline of civilian consumption, with a major reallocation to munitions. The government share of GDP soared from 8% in 1913 to 38% in 1918. Britain used up financial reserves and borrowed from the US.

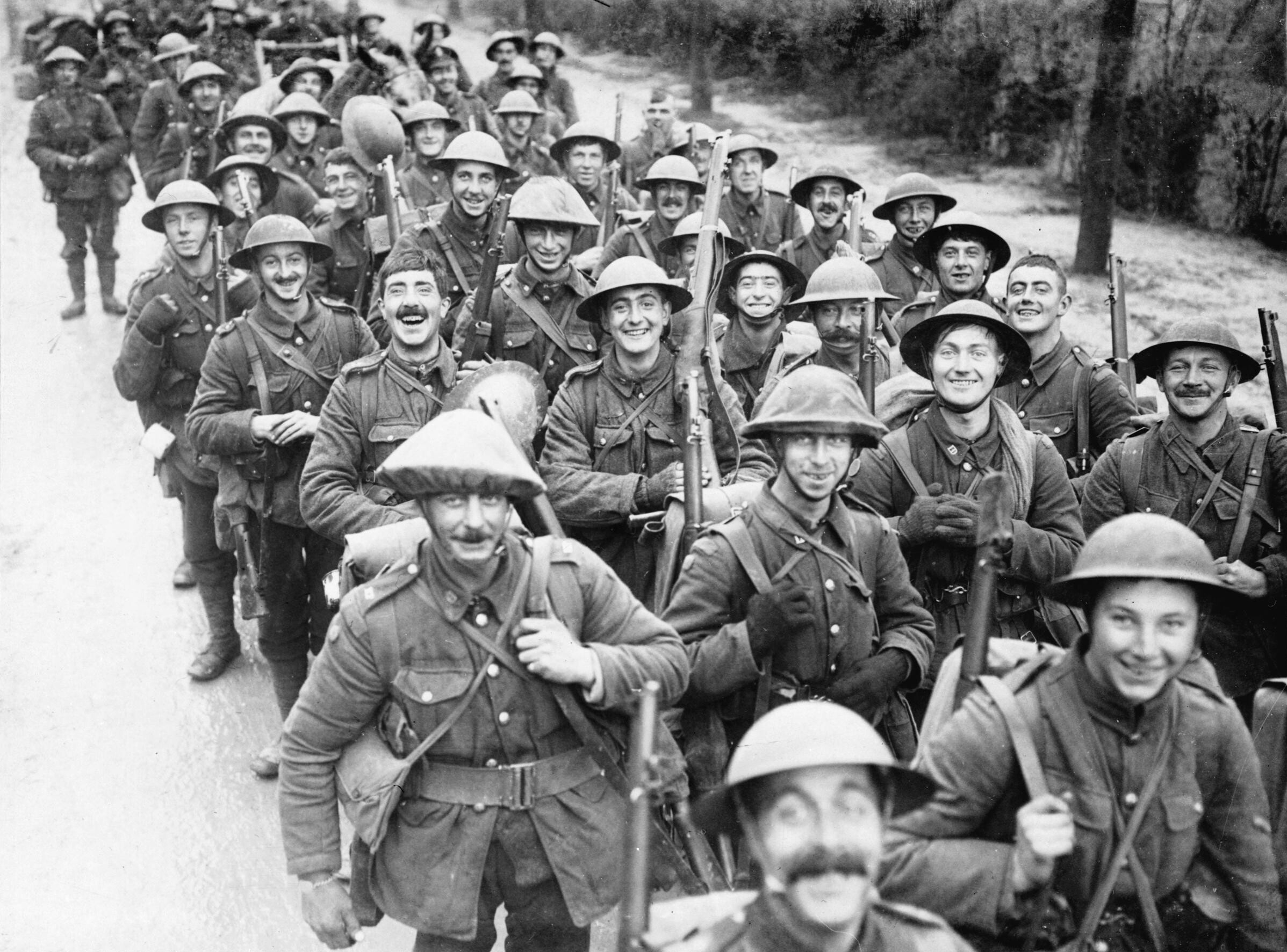
Royal Fusiliers (City of London Regiment) in November 1916

The Royal Navy dominated the seas, defeating the smaller German fleet. Germany's naval strategy increasingly turned towards use of U-boats to strike back, despite the risk of triggering war with the powerful, hitherto neutral, US. In 1915, a U-boat, without warning, torpedoed the British passenger liner Lusitania, drowning over 1000 civilians, including 100 Americans. Protests by President Woodrow Wilson forced Berlin to abandon unrestricted submarine warfare. Planning a spring offensive in 1918, Germany resumed the sinking of all merchant ships, even if they were flying the American flag. The US entered the war alongside the Allies, and provided the needed money and supplies to sustain the Allies' efforts. The British, French, Australians, and Japanese seized Germany's colonies. Britain fought the Ottoman Empire, suffering defeats in the Gallipoli campaign and in Mesopotamia (Iraq). The Germans tried to win in spring 1918 before Americans arrived. They failed, were overwhelmed by August and accepted an Armistice on 11 November 1918, that amounted to a surrender.

British society and government were radically transformed by the repeated calls for manpower, employment of women, dramatic increase in industrial production and munitions, price controls and rationing, and the wide and deep emotional patriotism dedicated to winning the war. Parliament took a backseat, as new departments, bureaus, committees and operations were created, experts consulted, and the prime minister's Orders in Council replaced the slow legislative process. Even after peace arrived, the new size and dynamism had permanently transformed the British government.

Victorian attitudes and ideals that had continued into 20th century, changed during the First World War. The three million casualties were known as the "Lost Generation", and left society scarred. The lost generation felt its sacrifice was little regarded in Britain, with poems like Siegfried Sassoon's Blighters criticising the ill-informed jingoism of the home front. The lost generation was politically inert, and never had its chance to make a generational change in political power. The young men who governed Britain in 1914 were the same old men who governed Britain in 1939.

=== Postwar settlement ===
The war had been won by Britain and its allies, but at a terrible human and financial cost, creating a sentiment that wars should never be fought again. The League of Nations was founded with the idea that nations could resolve their differences peacefully, but these hopes were unfulfilled. The harsh peace settlement imposed on Germany would leave it embittered and seeking revenge.

At the Paris Peace Conference of 1919, Lloyd George, American President Woodrow Wilson and French premier Georges Clemenceau made all the major decisions. They sliced up the losers territories to form new nations in Europe, and divided up the German colonies and Ottoman holdings outside Turkey. They imposed what appeared to be heavy financial reparations. They humiliated Germany by forcing it to declare its guilt for starting the war, a policy that caused deep resentment in Germany and helped fuel Nazism. Britain gained the German colony of Tanganyika and part of Togoland in Africa, while its dominions added other colonies. Britain gained League of Nations mandates over Palestine, which had been partly promised as a homeland for Jewish settlers, and Iraq. Egypt, which had been a British protectorate since 1882, became independent in 1922.

=== Irish independence and partition ===
In 1912 the House of Commons passed a new Home Rule bill. Under the Parliament Act 1911 the House of Lords retained the power to delay legislation up to two years, so it was enacted as the Government of Ireland Act 1914, but suspended for the duration of the war. Civil war threatened when the Protestant-Unionists of Northern Ireland refused to be placed under Catholic-Nationalist control. Semi-military units were formed ready to fight—the Unionist Ulster Volunteers opposed to the Act and their Nationalist counterparts, the Irish Volunteers supporting the Act. The outbreak of World War I put the crisis on hold. A disorganised Easter Rising in 1916 was brutally suppressed by the British, which had the effect of galvanizing Nationalist demands for independence. Prime Minister Lloyd George failed to introduce Home Rule in 1918 and in the General Election Sinn Féin won a majority of Irish seats. Its MPs refused to take their seats at Westminster, instead choosing to sit in the First Dáil parliament in Dublin. A declaration of independence was ratified by Dáil Éireann, the self-declared Republic's parliament in January 1919. An Anglo-Irish War was fought between Crown forces and the Irish Republican Army between January 1919 and June 1921. The war ended with the Anglo-Irish Treaty of December 1921 that established the Irish Free State. Six northern, predominantly Protestant counties became Northern Ireland and have remained part of the United Kingdom ever since, despite demands of the Catholic minority to unite with the Republic of Ireland. Britain officially adopted the name "United Kingdom of Great Britain and Northern Ireland" by the Royal and Parliamentary Titles Act 1927.

== Interwar era 1918–1939 ==
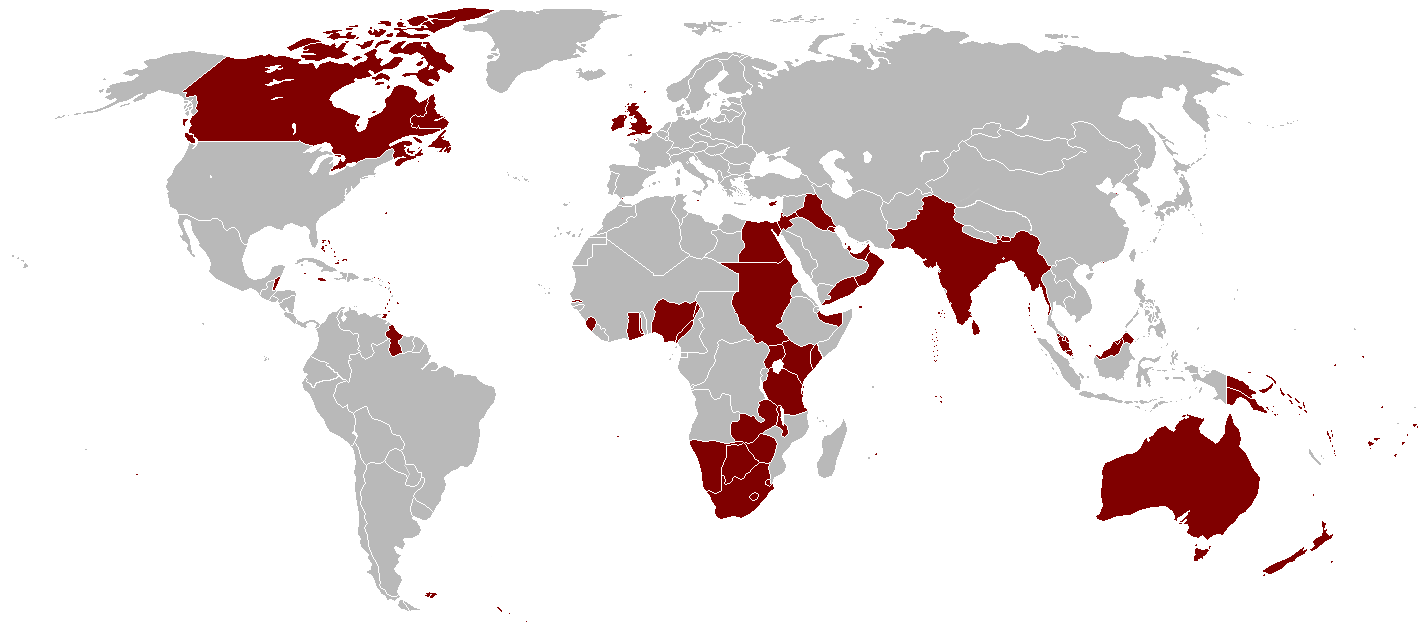
British Empire at its height in 1921

Historian Arthur Marwick sees a radical transformation of British society resulting from the Great War, that swept away many old attitudes and brought in a more equalitarian society. He sees the famous literary pessimism of the 1920s as misplaced, arguing there were major positive long-term consequences of the war to British society. He points to an energised self-consciousness among workers that quickly built up the Labour Party, the coming of partial woman suffrage, and an acceleration of social reform and state control of the economy. He sees a decline of deference toward the aristocracy and established authority in general, and the weakening among youth of traditional restraints on individual moral behavior. The chaperone faded away; village druggists sold contraceptives. Marwick says that class distinctions softened, national cohesion increased, and British society became more equal.

=== Popular culture ===
As a leisure, literacy, wealth, ease of travel, and a broadened sense of community grew in Britain from the late 19th century onward, there was more time and interest in leisure activities of all sorts, on the part of all classes. The annual vacation became common. Tourists flocked to seaside resorts; Blackpool hosted 7 million visitors a year in the 1930s. Organised leisure was primarily a male activity, with middle-class women allowed in at the margins. There were class differences with upper-class clubs, and working-class and middle-class pubs. Heavy drinking declined; there were more competitions that attracted heavy betting. Participation in sports and all sorts of leisure activities increased for the average Englishman, and his interest in spectator sports increased dramatically. By the 1920s the cinema and radio attracted all classes, ages and genders in very large numbers, with young women taking the lead. Working-class men wearing flat caps and eating fish and chips were boisterous football spectators. They sang along at the music hall, fancied their pigeons, gambled on horse racing, and took the family to Blackpool in summer. The cartoon realisation of this life style Andy Capp began in 1957. Political activists complained that working-class leisure diverted men away from revolutionary agitation.

==== Cinema and radio ====
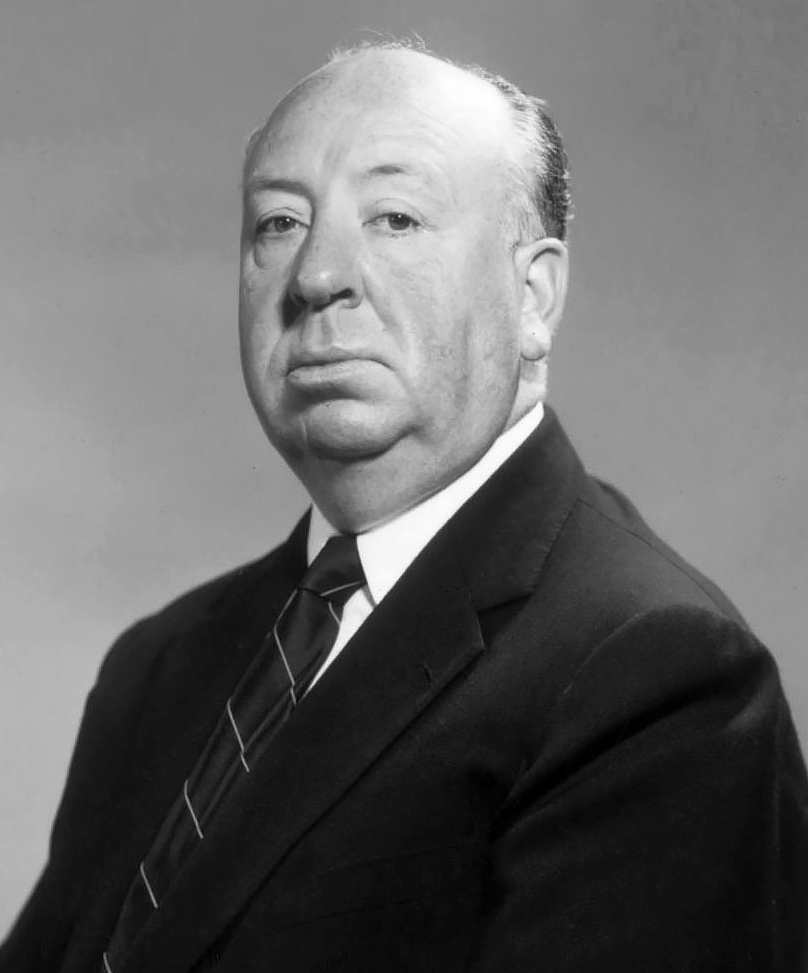
Film director Alfred Hitchcock, 1955

The British film industry emerged in the 1890s when cinemas in general broke through in the western world, and built heavily on the strong reputation of the London legitimate theatre for actors, directors and producers. The problem was that the American market was so much larger and richer. It bought up the top talent, especially when Hollywood came to the fore in the 1920s and produced over 80 per cent of the total world output. Efforts to fight back were futile—the government set a quota for British made films, but it failed. Hollywood furthermore dominated the lucrative Canadian and Australian markets. Bollywood (based in Bombay) dominated the huge Indian market. The most prominent directors remaining in London were Alexander Korda, an expatriate Hungarian, and Alfred Hitchcock. There was a revival of creativity in the 1933–1945 era, especially with the arrival of Jewish filmmakers and actors fleeing the Nazis. Meanwhile, giant palaces were built for the huge audiences that wanted to see Hollywood films. In Liverpool 40 per cent of the population attended one of the 69 cinemas once a week; 25 per cent went twice. Traditionalists grumbled about the American cultural invasion, but the permanent impact was minor.

In radio, British audiences had no choice apart from the upscale programming of the BBC, a government agency which had a monopoly on broadcasting. John Reith, an intensely moralistic engineer, was in full charge. His goal was to broadcast, "All that is best in every department of human knowledge, endeavour and achievement.... The preservation of a high moral tone is obviously of paramount importance."

==== Sports ====
The British showed a more profound interest in sports, and in greater variety, than any rival. They gave pride of place to such moral issues as sportsmanship and fair play. Football proved highly attractive to the urban working classes, which introduced the rowdy spectator to the sports world. New games became popular almost overnight, including golf, lawn tennis, cycling and hockey. Women were much more likely to enter these sports than the old established ones. The aristocracy and landed gentry, with their ironclad control over land rights, dominated hunting, shooting, fishing and horse racing. Cricket reflected the Imperial spirit throughout the Empire (except Canada). Test matches began by the 1870s; the most famous are those between Australia and England for The Ashes.

==== Reading ====
As literacy and leisure time expanded after 1900, reading became a popular pastime. New additions to adult fiction doubled during the 1920s, reaching 2800 new books a year by 1935. Libraries tripled their stock, and saw heavy demand for new fiction. A dramatic innovation was the inexpensive paperback, pioneered by Allen Lane at Penguin Books in 1935. The first titles included novels by Ernest Hemingway and Agatha Christie. They were sold cheap (usually sixpence) in a wide variety of inexpensive stores such as Woolworth's. Penguin aimed at an educated middle class "middlebrow" audience. It avoided the downmarket image of American paperbacks. The line signalled cultural self-improvement and political education. However the war years caused a shortage of staff for publishers and book stores, and a severe shortage of rationed paper, worsened by the air raid on Paternoster Square in 1940 that burned 5 million books in warehouses.

Romantic fiction was especially popular, with Mills & Boon the leading publisher. Romantic encounters were embodied in a principle of sexual purity that demonstrated not only social conservatism, but also how heroines could control their personal autonomy. Adventure magazines became quite popular, especially those published by DC Thomson; the publisher sent observers around the country to talk to boys and learn what they wanted to read about. The story line in magazines and cinema that most appealed to boys was the glamorous heroism of British soldiers fighting wars that were exciting and just.

=== Politics and economics of the 1920s ===
==== Expanding the welfare state ====
Two major programmes that permanently expanded the welfare state passed in 1919 and 1920 with surprisingly little debate, even as the Conservatives dominated parliament. The Housing, Town Planning, &c. Act 1919 set up a system of government housing that followed the 1918 campaign promises of "homes fit for heroes." This "Addison Act", named after the first Minister of Health, Christopher Addison, required local authorities to survey their housing needs and start building houses to replace slums. The Treasury subsidised the low rents. In England and Wales 214,000 houses were built, and the Ministry of Health became largely a ministry of housing.

The Unemployment Insurance Act 1920 passed at a time of very little unemployment. It set up the dole system that provided 39 weeks of unemployment benefits to practically the entire civilian working population except domestic service, farm workers, and civil servants. Funded in part by weekly contributions from both employers and employed, it provided weekly payments of 15s for unemployed men and 12s for unemployed women. Historian C. L. Mowat calls these two laws "Socialism by the back door", and notes how surprised politicians were when the costs to the Treasury soared during the high unemployment of 1921.

=== Conservative control ===
The Lloyd George ministry fell apart in 1922. Stanley Baldwin, as leader of the Conservative Party (1923–1937) and as Prime Minister (in 1923–1924, 1924–1929 and 1935–1937), dominated British politics. His mixture of strong social reforms and steady government proved a powerful election combination, with the result that the Conservatives governed Britain either by themselves or as the leading component of the National Government. He was the last party leader to win over 50% of the vote (in the general election of 1931). Baldwin's political strategy was to polarize the electorate so that voters would choose between the Conservatives on the right and the Labour Party on the left, squeezing out the Liberals in the middle. The polarisation did take place and while the Liberals remained active under Lloyd George, they won few seats and were a minor factor until they joined a coalition with the Conservatives in 2010. Baldwin's reputation soared in the 1920s and 1930s, but crashed after 1945 as he was blamed for the appeasement policies toward Germany, and as admirers of Churchill made him the Conservative icon. Since the 1970s Baldwin's reputation has recovered somewhat.

Labour won the 1923 election, but in 1924 Baldwin and the Conservatives returned with a large majority.

McKibbin finds that the political culture of the interwar period was built around an anti-socialist middle class, supported by the Conservative leaders, especially Baldwin.

=== Economics ===
Taxes rose sharply during the war and never returned to their old levels. A rich man paid 8% of his income in taxes before the war, and about a third afterwards. Much of the money went for the dole, the weekly unemployment benefits. About 5% of the national income every year was transferred from the rich to the poor. A. J. P. Taylor argues most people "were enjoying a richer life than any previously known in the history of the world: longer holidays, shorter hours, higher real wages."

The British economy was lackluster in the 1920s, with sharp declines and high unemployment in heavy industry and coal, especially in Scotland and Wales. Exports of coal and steel fell in half by 1939 and the business community was slow to adopt the new labour and management principles coming from the US, such as Fordism, consumer credit, eliminating surplus capacity, designing a more structured management, and using greater economies of scale. For over a century the shipping industry had dominated world trade, but it remained in the doldrums despite various stimulus efforts by the government. With the very sharp decline in world trade after 1929, its condition became critical.

Chancellor of the Exchequer Winston Churchill put Britain back on the gold standard in 1925, which many economists blame for the mediocre performance of the economy. Others point to a variety of factors, including the inflationary effects of the World War and supply-side shocks caused by reduced working hours after the war.

By the late 1920s, economic performance had stabilised, but the overall situation was disappointing, for Britain had fallen behind the United States as the leading industrial power. There also remained a strong economic divide between the north and south of England during this period, with the south of England and the Midlands fairly prosperous by the Thirties, while parts of south Wales and the industrial north of England became known as "distressed areas" due to particularly high rates of unemployment and poverty. Despite this, the standard of living continued to improve as local councils built new houses to let to families rehoused from outdated slums, with up to date facilities including indoor toilets, bathrooms and electric lighting now being included in the new properties. The private sector enjoyed a housebuilding boom during the 1930s.

==== Labour ====
During the war, trade unions were encouraged and their membership grew from 4.1 million in 1914 to 6.5 million in 1918. They peaked at 8.3 million in 1920 before relapsing to 5.4 million in 1923.

Coal was a sick industry; the best seams were being exhausted, raising the cost. Demand fell as oil began replacing coal for fuel. The 1926 general strike was a nine-day nationwide walkout of 1.3 million railwaymen, transport workers, printers, dockers, iron workers and steelworkers supporting the 1.2 million coal miners who had been locked out by the owners. The miners had rejected the owners' demands for longer hours and reduced pay in the face of falling prices. The Conservative government had provided a nine-month subsidy in 1925 but that was not enough to turn around a sick industry. To support the miners the Trades Union Congress (TUC), an umbrella organisation of all trades unions, called out certain critical unions. The hope was the government would intervene to reorganize and rationalize the industry, and raise the subsidy. The Conservative government had stockpiled supplies and essential services continued with middle class volunteers. All three major parties opposed the strike. The Labour Party leaders did not approve and feared it would tar the party with the image of radicalism, for the Comintern in Moscow had sent instructions for Communists to aggressively promote the strike. The general strike itself was largely non-violent, but the miners' lockout continued and there was violence in Scotland. It was the only general strike in British history, for TUC leaders such as Ernest Bevin considered it a mistake. Most historians treat it as a singular event with few long-term consequences, but Martin Pugh says it accelerated the movement of working-class voters to the Labour Party, which led to future gains. The Trade Disputes and Trade Unions Act 1927 made general strikes illegal and ended the automatic payment of union members to the Labour Party. That act was largely repealed in 1946. The coal industry used up the more accessible coal and as costs rose output fell from 2567 million tons in 1924 to 183 million in 1945. The Labour government nationalised the mines in 1947.

=== Great Depression ===
The Great Depression originated in the United States in late 1929 and quickly spread to the world. Britain had never experienced the boom that had characterised the US, Germany, Canada and Australia in the 1920s, so its bust appeared less severe. Britain's world trade fell in half (1929–1933), the output of heavy industry fell by a third, employment profits plunged in nearly all sectors. At the depth in summer 1932, registered unemployed numbered 3.5 million, and many more had only part-time employment. Experts tried to remain optimistic. John Maynard Keynes, who had not predicted the slump, said, "'There will be no serious direct consequences in London. We find the look ahead decidedly encouraging."

On the left figures such as Sidney and Beatrice Webb, J. A. Hobson, and G. D. H. Cole repeated the warnings they had been making for years about the imminent death of capitalism, only now far more people paid attention. Starting in 1935 the Left Book Club provided a new warning every month, and built up the credibility of Soviet-style socialism as an alternative.

Particularly hardest hit by economic problems were the north of England, Scotland, Northern Ireland and Wales; unemployment reached 70% in some areas at the start of the 1930s (with more than 3 million out of work nationally) and many families depended entirely on the dole.

In 1936, by which time unemployment was lower, 200 unemployed men made a highly publicised march from Jarrow to London in a bid to show the plight of the industrial poor. Although much romanticised by the Left, the Jarrow Crusade marked a deep split in the Labour Party and resulted in no government action. Unemployment remained high until the war absorbed all the job seekers. George Orwell's book The Road to Wigan Pier gives a bleak overview of the hardships of the time.

=== Appeasement ===
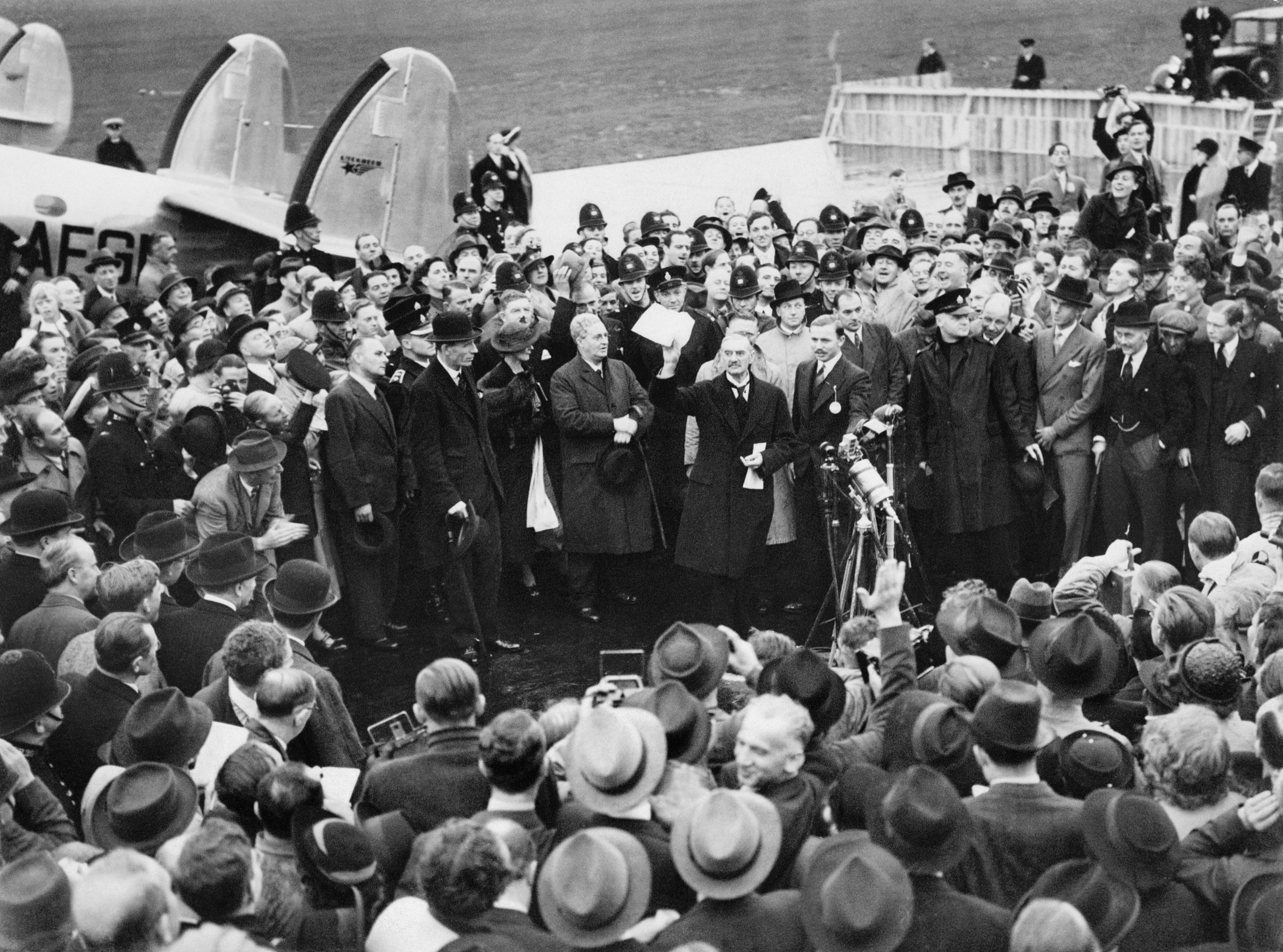
British Prime Minister Neville Chamberlain, landing at Heston Aerodrome on 30 September 1938 after his meeting with Hitler at Munich. In his hand he holds the peace agreement between Britain and Germany.

Chamberlain returns from Munich with Anglo-German Agreement

Vivid memories of the horrors and deaths of the World War made Britain and its leaders strongly inclined to pacifism in the interwar era. The challenge came from dictators, first Benito Mussolini of Italy, then Adolf Hitler of a much more powerful Nazi Germany. The League of Nations proved disappointing to its supporters; it was unable to resolve any of the threats posed by the dictators. British policy was to "appease" them in the hopes they would be satiated. By 1938 it was clear that war was looming, and that Germany had the world's most powerful military. The final act of appeasement came when Britain and France sacrificed Czechoslovakia to Hitler's demands at the Munich Agreement of 1938. Instead of satiation Hitler menaced Poland, and at last Prime Minister Neville Chamberlain dropped appeasement and stood firm in promising to defend Poland. Hitler however cut a deal with Joseph Stalin to divide Eastern Europe; when Germany did invade Poland in September 1939, Britain and France declared war; the British Commonwealth followed London's lead.

== World War II (1939–1945) ==
Prime Minister Neville Chamberlain announcing the beginning of the war on Nazi Germany

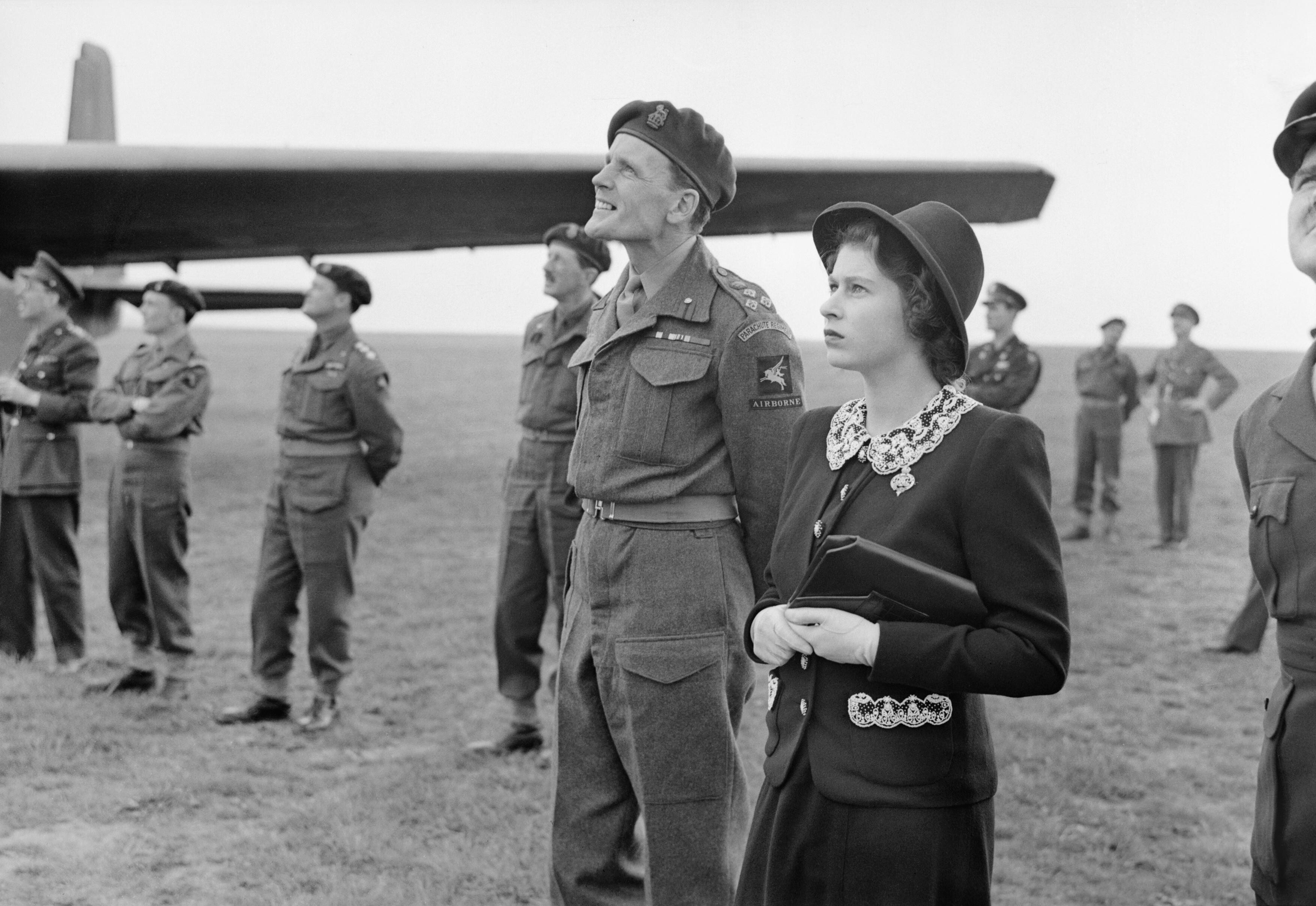
Princess Elizabeth watching parachutists dropping during a visit to airborne forces in England in the run-up to D-Day, 1944. Stood next to her is Brigadier James "Speedy" Hill, commander of the 3rd Parachute Brigade.

The King declared war on Nazi Germany in September 1939, after the German invasion of Poland. During the quiet period of "Phoney War", the British sent to France the most highly mechanised army in the world; together with France they had more tanks than Germany, but fewer warplanes. The smashing German victory in Spring 1940 was due entirely to "superior combat doctrine. Realistic training, imaginative battlefield leadership, and unparalleled initiative from generals down to sergeants." The British with the thinnest of margins rescued its main army from Dunkirk (as well as many French soldiers), leaving all their equipment and war supplies behind. Winston Churchill came to power, promising to fight the Germans to the very end. The Germans threatened an invasion—which the Royal Navy was prepared to repel. First the Germans tried to achieve air supremacy but were defeated by the Royal Air Force in the Battle of Britain in late summer 1940. Japan declared war in December 1941, and quickly seised Hong Kong, Malaya, Singapore, and Burma, and threatened Australia and India. Britain formed an alliance with the Soviet Union (starting in 1941) and very close ties to the United States (starting in 1940). The war was very expensive. It was paid for by high taxes, by selling off assets, and by accepting large amounts of Lend-Lease from the U.S. and Canada. The U.S. gave $30 billion in munitions; Canada also gave aid. (The American and Canadian aid did not have to be repaid, but there were also American loans that were repaid.)

Britain's total mobilisation during this period proved to be successful in winning the war, by maintaining strong support from public opinion. The war was a "people's war" that enlarged democratic aspirations and produced promises of a postwar welfare state.

The media called it a "people's war"—a term that caught on and signified the popular demand for planning and an expanded welfare state. The Royal family played major symbolic roles in the war. They refused to leave London during the Blitz and were indefatigable in visiting troops, munition factories, dockyards, and hospitals all over the country. All social classes appreciated how the royals shared the hopes, fears and hardships of the people.

=== Mobilisation of women ===
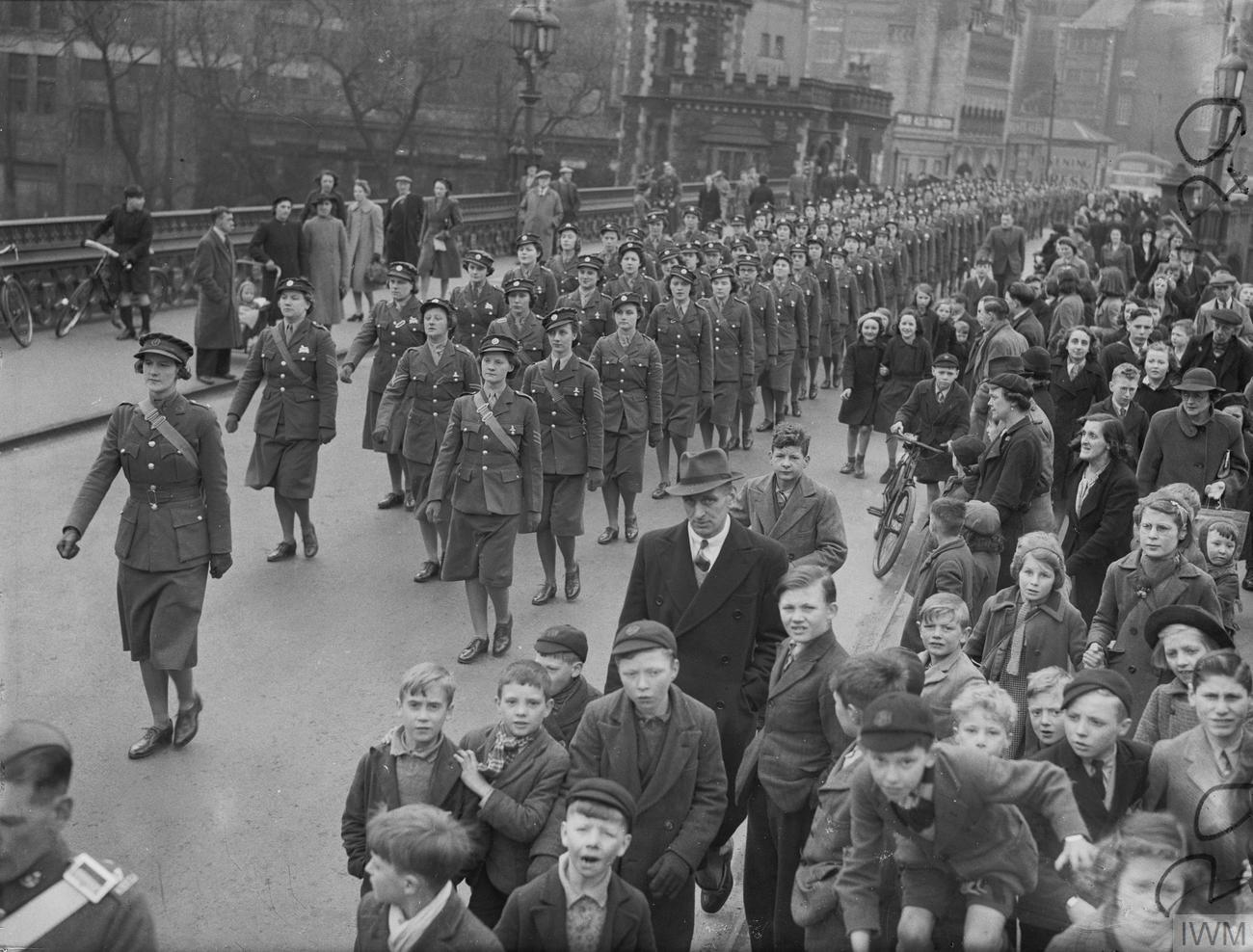
Auxiliary Territorial Service women in York

Historians credit Britain with mobilising the home front for the war effort, in terms of mobilising a large proportion of potential workers, maximising output, assigning skills to tasks, and maintaining the morale of the people.

Much of this success was due to the systematic planned mobilisation of women, as workers, soldiers and housewives, enforced after December 1941 by conscription. Women supported the war effort, and made the rationing of consumer goods a success. In some ways the government over-responded, evacuating too many children in the first days of the war, closing cinemas as frivolous then reopening them when the need for cheap entertainment became clear, sacrificing cats and dogs to save a little space on shipping pet food, only to discover an urgent need to keep rats and mice under control.

The British relied successfully on voluntarism. Munitions production rose dramatically, and the quality remained high. Food production was emphasised, in large part to free shipping for munitions. Farmers increased the area under cultivation from 12,000,000 to 18,000,000 acres (from about 50,000 to 75,000 km^{2}), and the farm labour force was expanded by a fifth, thanks especially to the Women's Land Army.

=== Welfare state ===
The success of the government in providing new services, such as hospitals and school lunches, as well as egalitarian spirit, contributed to widespread support for an enlarged welfare state. It was supported by the coalition government and all major parties. Welfare conditions, especially regarding food, improved during the war as the government imposed rationing and subsidised food prices. Conditions for housing, however, worsened with the bombing, and clothing was in short supply.

Equality increased dramatically, as incomes declined sharply for the wealthy and for white collar workers, as their taxes soared, while blue collar workers benefited from rationing and price controls.

People demanded an expansion of the welfare state as a reward to the people for their wartime sacrifices. The goal was operationalised in a famous report by William Beveridge. It recommended that the various income maintenance services that had grown-up piecemeal since 1911 be systematised and made universal. Unemployment benefits and sickness benefits were to be universal. There would be new benefits for maternity. The old-age pension system would be revised and expanded, and require that a person retired. A full-scale National Health Service would provide free medical care for everyone. All the major parties endorsed the principles and they were largely put into effect when peace returned.

== Postwar ==
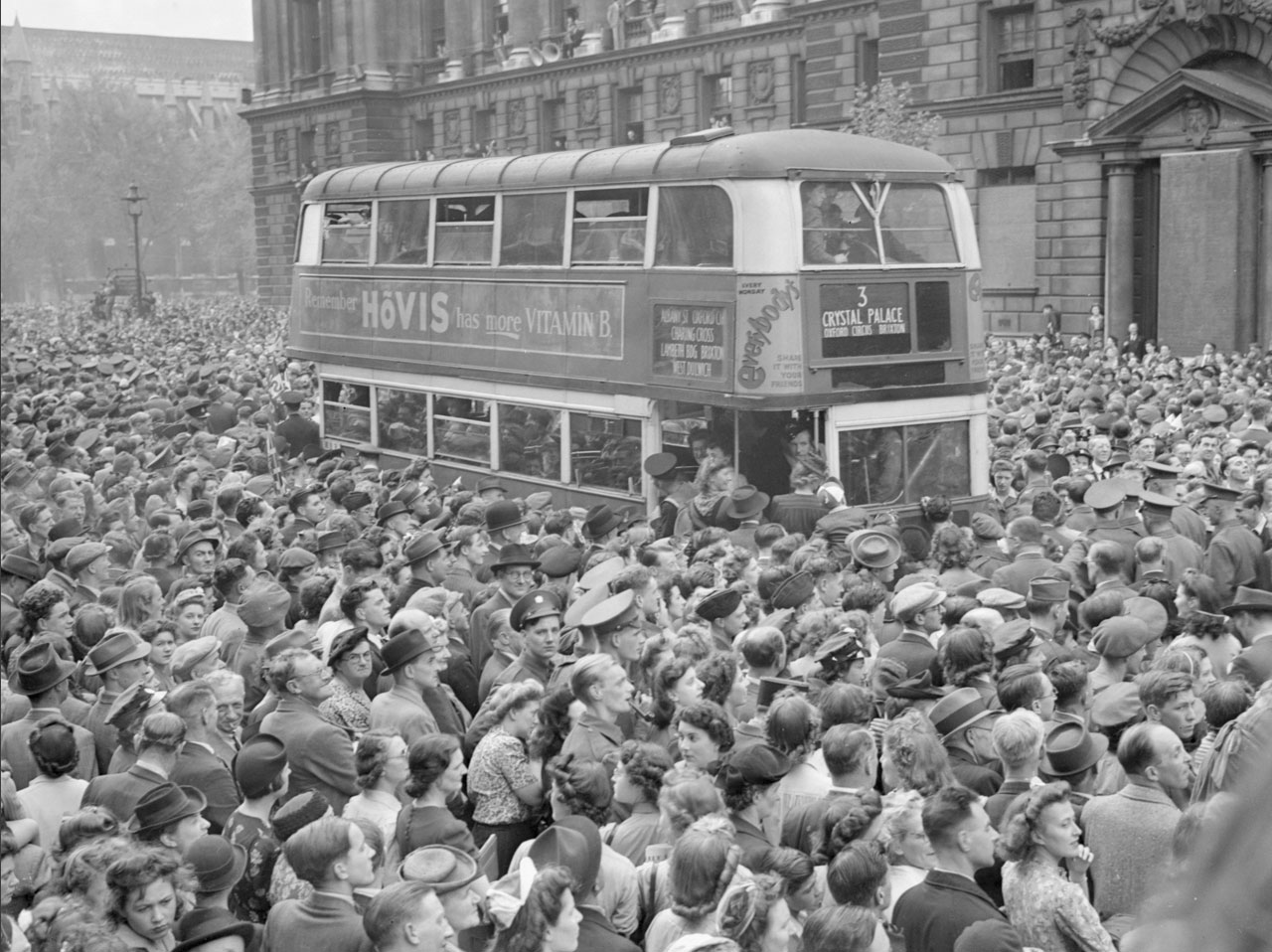
People gathered in Whitehall to hear Winston Churchill's victory speech and celebrate Victory in Europe, 8 May 1945.

Britain had won the war, but it lost India in 1947 and nearly all the rest of the Empire by the 1960s. It debated its role in world affairs and joined the United Nations in 1945, NATO in 1949, and became a close ally of the United States. Prosperity returned in the 1950s, and London remained a world centre of finance and culture, but the nation was no longer a major world power. In 1973, after a long debate and initial rejection, it joined the Common Market.

=== Austerity, 1945–1950 ===
The end of the war saw a landslide victory for Clement Attlee and the Labour Party. They were elected on a manifesto of greater social justice with left-wing policies such as the creation of a National Health Service, more council housing and nationalisation of several major industries. Britain faced a severe financial crisis, and responded by reducing her international responsibilities and by sharing the hardships of an "age of austerity". Large loans from the United States and Marshall Plan grants helped rebuild and modernise its infrastructure and business practices. Rationing and conscription dragged on well into the post war years, and the country suffered one of the worst winters on record. Nevertheless, morale was boosted by events such as the marriage of Princess Elizabeth in 1947 and the Festival of Britain in 1951.

==== Nationalisation ====
Labour Party leaders decided to act quickly to keep up the momentum of the 1945 electoral landslide. They began with the Bank of England, civil aviation, coal, and Cable & Wireless. Then came railways, canals, road haulage and trucking, electricity, and gas. Finally came iron and steel. Altogether, about one fifth of the economy was nationalised. Labour dropped its plans to nationalise farmlands. The procedure used was developed by Herbert Morrison, who as Lord President of the Council chaired the Committee on the Socialisation of Industries. He followed the model already used to establish public corporations such as the BBC (1927). In exchange for shares, the owners of the companies were given government bonds paying low rates of interest, and the government took full ownership of each affected company, consolidating it into a national monopoly. The management remained the same, but they were now effectively civil servants working for the government.

There was no money for modernisation, although the Marshall Plan, operated separately by American planners, did force many British businesses to adopt modern managerial techniques. Hardline socialists were disappointed, as the nationalised industries seemed identical to the old private corporations, and national planning was made virtually impossible by the government's financial constraints. Workers had long been motivated to support Labour by reports of mistreatment of workers by management. The managers were the same people as before, with much the same power over the workplace. There was no worker control of industry. The unions resisted government efforts to set wages. By the time of the general elections in 1950 and 1951, Labour seldom discussed nationalisation of industry. Instead it was the Conservatives who decried the inefficiency and mismanagement, and promised to reverse the takeover of steel and trucking.

=== Prosperity of the postwar years ===
As the country headed into the 1950s, rebuilding continued and immigrants from the remaining British Empire, mostly the Caribbean and Indian subcontinent, were invited to help rebuild. Britain lost its place as a superpower and could no longer maintain its empire. This led to decolonisation, and a withdrawal from almost all its colonies by 1970. Events such as the Suez Crisis showed the UK's status had fallen. The 1950s and 60s were however, prosperous, and saw modernisation of the UK, with the construction of its first motorways for example, and during the 1960s a cultural movement began which expanded across the world. Unemployment was low, new private and council housing development took place, and the number of slum properties diminished.

The postwar period witnessed a dramatic rise in the standard of living, as characterised by a 40% rise in average real wages from 1950 to 1965. The official workweek was reduced and reductions in income tax were made. Those in traditionally poorly paid semi-skilled and unskilled occupations saw a marked improvement in their wages and living standards. As summed up by R. J. Unstead,

Opportunities in life, if not equal, were distributed much more fairly than ever before and the weekly wage-earner, in particular, had gained standards of living that would have been almost unbelievable in the thirties.

Between 1955-67, the average earnings of weekly-paid workers increased by 96% and those of salaried workers by 95%, while prices rose by about 45%, enabling people to afford more consumer goods. Between 1964-68, the percentage of households with a television set rose from 81% to 86%, a washing machine from 54% to 63%, a refrigerator from 35% to 55%, a car from 38% to 49%, a telephone from 22% to 28%, and central heating from 13% to 23%. The rising affluence was underpinned by full employment. Economic growth remained at about 3%. Food rations were lifted in 1954, while hire-purchase controls were relaxed. Many of the working classes were able to participate in the consumer market for the first time.

As noted by Harriet Wilson,

National wealth has grown considerably, and although the shareout of this among the social classes has remained substantially of the same proportions, it has meant a considerable rise in the standard of living of all classes. It is estimated that in Britain at the turn of the century average earnings in industry sufficed merely to meet the essential needs of a two-child family, today average earnings allow the industrial wage-earner to spend a third of his income on things other than basic needs.

The significant real wage increases in the 1950s and 1960s contributed to a rapid increase in working-class consumerism, with British consumer spending rising by 45% between 1952 and 1964. Entitlement to benefits was improved. In 1955, 96% of manual labourers were entitled to two weeks' holiday with pay, compared with 61% in 1951. By the end of the 1950s, Britain had become one of the world's most affluent countries, and by the early Sixties, most Britons enjoyed a level of prosperity previously known only to a small minority. For the young and unattached, there was, for the first time in decades, spare cash for leisure, clothes, and luxuries. In 1959, Queen magazine declared that "Britain has launched into an age of unparalleled lavish living." Prime Minister Harold Macmillan claimed that "the luxuries of the rich have become the necessities of the poor." Levels of disposable income rose steadily, with the spending power of the average family rising by 50% between 1951 and 1979, and by the end of the Seventies, 6 out of 10 families owned a car.

As noted by Martin Pugh,

Keynesian economic management enabled British workers to enjoy a golden age of full employment which, combined with a more relaxed attitude towards working mothers, led to the spread of the two-income family. Inflation was around 4 per cent, money wages rose from an average of £8 a week in 1951 to £15 a week by 1961, home-ownership spread from 35 per cent in 1939 to 47 per cent by 1966, and the relaxation of credit controls boosted the demand for consumer goods.

As noted by John Burnett,

What was equally striking was that ownership of [consumer goods] had spread down the social scale and the gap between professional and manual workers had considerably narrowed.

A study of a slum area in Leeds (due for demolition) found 74% of the households had a television, 41% a vacuum, and 38% a washing machine. In another slum area, St Mary's in Oldham (where in 1970 few of the houses had fixed baths or a hot water supply and half shared outside toilets), 67% of the houses were comfortably furnished and a further 24% furnished luxuriously, with smart modern furniture, deep pile carpeting, and decorations. The provision of household amenities steadily improved during the second half of the twentieth century. From 1971 to 1983, households having the sole use of a fixed bath or shower rose from 88% to 97%, and those with an internal WC from 87% to 97%. Households with central heating almost doubled, from 34% to 64%. By 1983, 94% of all households had a refrigerator, 81% a colour television, 80% a washing machine, 57% a deep freezer, and 28% a tumble-drier.

Between 1950 and 1970, however, Britain was overtaken by most countries of the European Common Market in terms of telephones, refrigerators, televisions, cars, and washing machines per 100 of the population (though Britain remained high in terms of bathrooms and lavatories). Although the British standard of living was increasing, the standard of living in other countries increased faster. According to a 1968 study by Anthony Sampson, British workers:

In ten years, from having had a much higher standard of living than the continent, they have slipped right back. Taking the national income per head (a rough yardstick), the British by 1967 had sunk to eighth place among OECD countries, with an annual income of $1,910 compared with $2,010 for Germany, $2,060 for France and $2,480 for Switzerland: and Britain's falling position already shows itself in the lower proportion of new cars and new houses (though still leading with TV sets and washing machines)."

In 1950, the standard of living was higher than in any EEC country apart from Belgium. It was 50% higher than West Germany, and twice as high as Italy. In 1976, UK wages were amongst the lowest in Western Europe, being half of West German rates and two-thirds of Italian rates. In addition, while educational opportunities for working-class people had widened significantly since the end of the war, a number of developed countries came to overtake Britain in some educational indicators. By the early 1980s, some 80% to 90% of school leavers in France and West Germany received vocational training, compared with 40% in the UK. By the mid-1980s, over 80% of pupils in the US and West Germany and over 90% in Japan stayed in education until 18, compared with 33% of British pupils. In 1987, only 35% of 16- to 18-year-olds were in full-time education or training, compared with 80% in the US, 77% in Japan, 69% in France. There remained gaps between manual and non-manual workers in areas such as benefits and wages. In 1978 male full-time manual workers aged 21 and above averaged a gross weekly wage of £80, while the equivalent for male white collar workers stood at £100.

=== Empire to Commonwealth ===
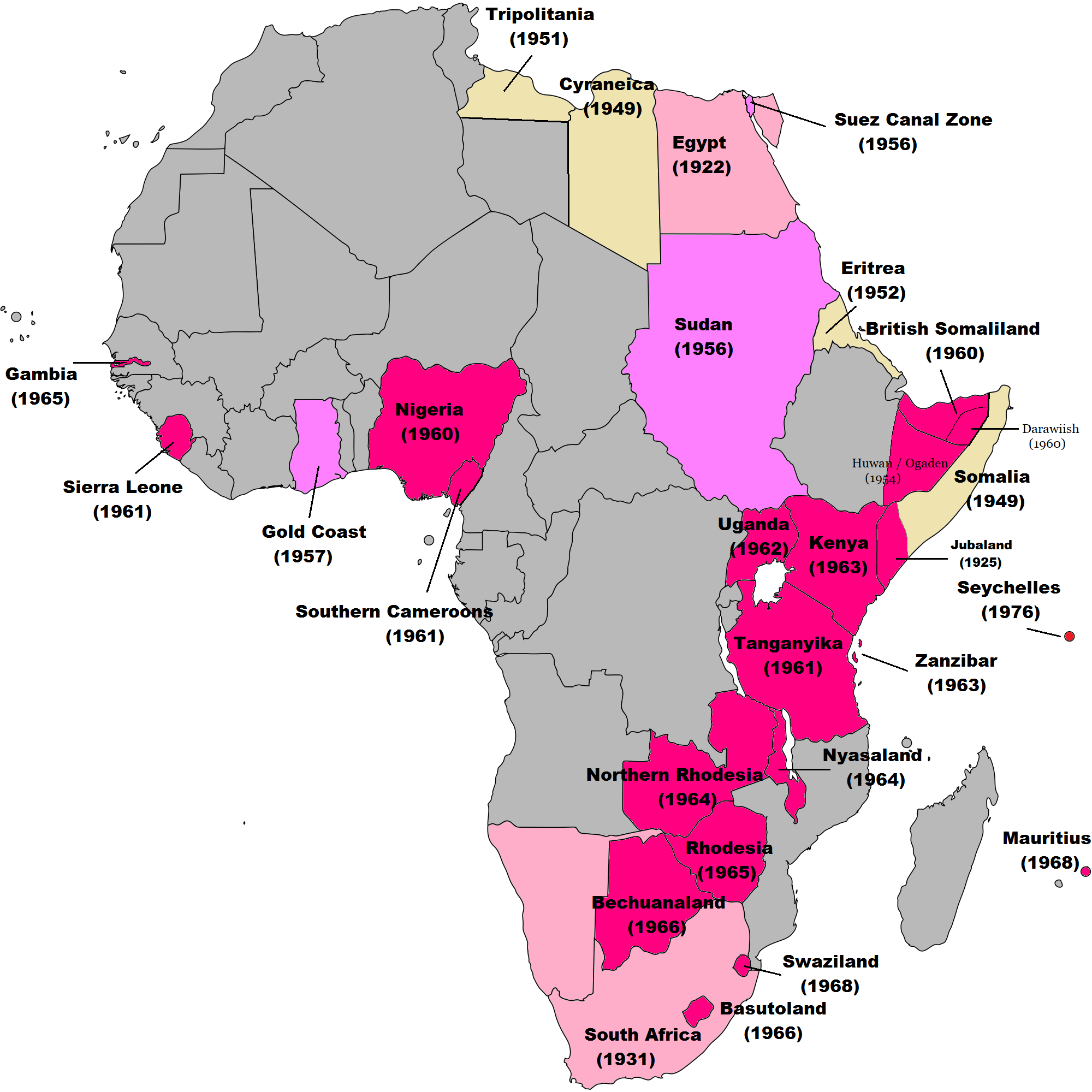
British decolonisation in Africa

Britain's control over its Empire loosened during the interwar period. Nationalism strengthened in other parts of the empire, particularly in India and in Egypt.

Between 1867 and 1910, the UK had granted Australia, Canada, and New Zealand "Dominion" status (near complete autonomy within the Empire). They became charter members of the British Commonwealth of Nations (known as the Commonwealth of Nations since 1949), an informal but close-knit association that succeeded the British Empire. Beginning with the independence of India and Pakistan in 1947, the remainder of the British Empire was almost completely dismantled. Today, most of Britain's former colonies belong to the Commonwealth, almost all of them as independent members. There are, however, 13 former British colonies, including Bermuda, Gibraltar, the Falkland Islands, and others, which have elected to continue rule by London and are known as British Overseas Territories.

=== From the Troubles to the Belfast Agreement ===
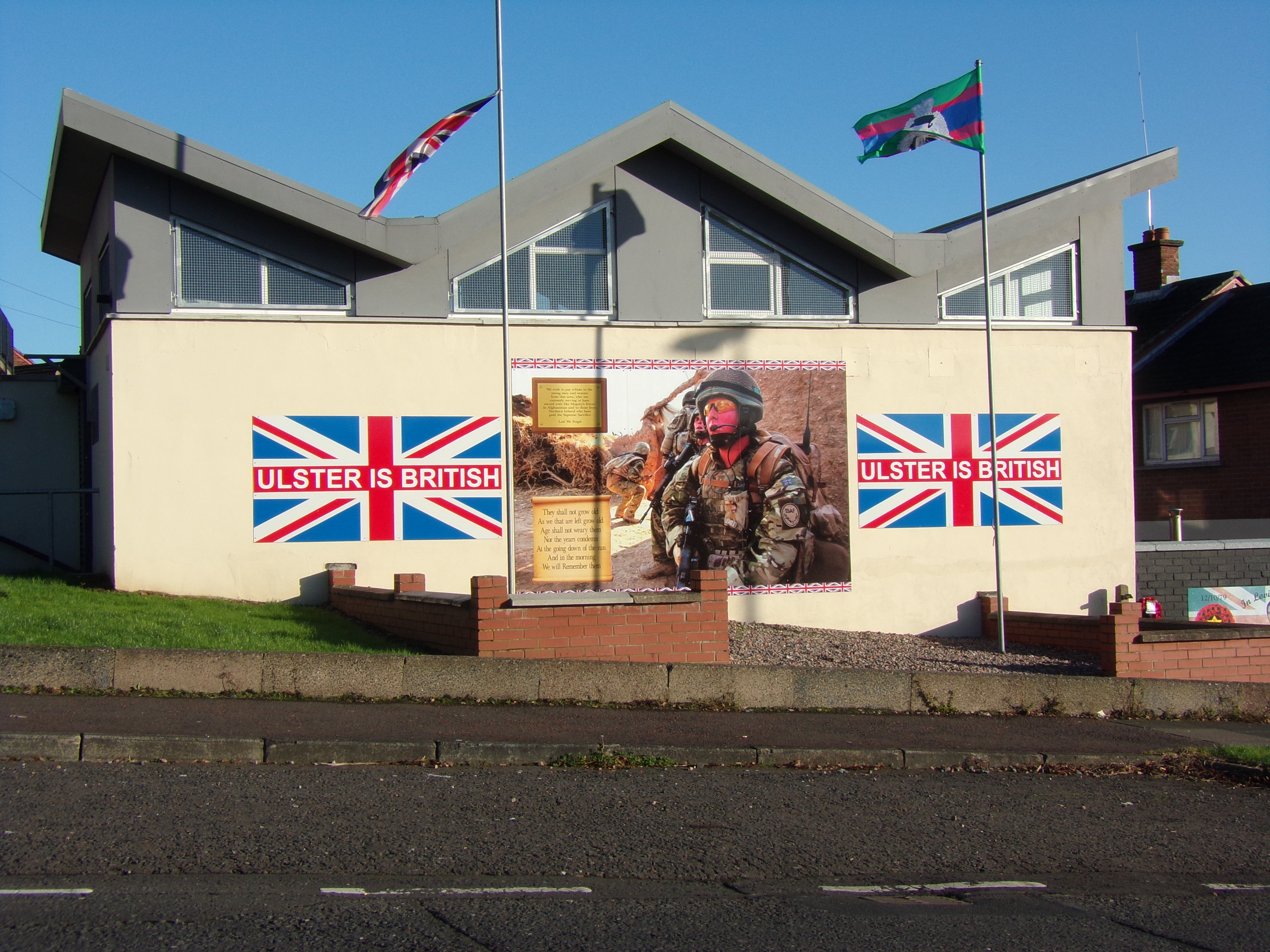
A mural in Ulster supporting for the Royal Irish Regiment

In the 1960s, moderate unionist Prime Minister of Northern Ireland Terence O'Neill tried to reform the system and give a greater voice to Catholics who comprised 40% of the population of Northern Ireland. His goals were blocked by militant Protestants led by the Rev. Ian Paisley. The increasing pressures from nationalists for reform and from unionists to resist reform led to the appearance of the civil rights movement under figures like John Hume, Austin Currie and others. Clashes escalated out of control as the army could barely contain the Provisional Irish Republican Army (IRA) and the Ulster Defence Association. British leaders feared their withdrawal would give a "Doomsday Scenario", with widespread communal strife, followed by the mass exodus of hundreds of thousands of refugees. London shut down Northern Ireland's parliament and began direct rule. By the 1990s, the failure of the IRA campaign to win mass public support or achieve its aim of a British withdrawal led to negotiations that in 1998 produced the 'Good Friday Agreement'. It won popular support and largely ended the Troubles.

=== The economy in the late 20th century ===
After the relative prosperity of the 1950s and 1960s, the UK experienced industrial strife and stagflation through the 1970s following a global economic downturn; Labour had returned to government in 1964 under Harold Wilson to end 13 years of Conservative rule. The Conservatives were restored to government in 1970 under Edward Heath, who failed to halt the country's economic decline and was ousted in 1974 as Labour returned to power under Harold Wilson. The economic crisis deepened following Wilson's return and things fared little better under his successor James Callaghan.

A strict modernisation of its economy began under the controversial Conservative leader Margaret Thatcher following her election as prime minister in 1979, which saw a time of record unemployment as deindustrialisation saw the end of much of the country's manufacturing industries, but also a time of economic boom as stock markets became liberalised and state-owned industries were privatised. Her rise to power was seen as the symbolic end of the time in which the British economy had become the "sick man" of western Europe. Inflation also fell during this period and trade union power was reduced.

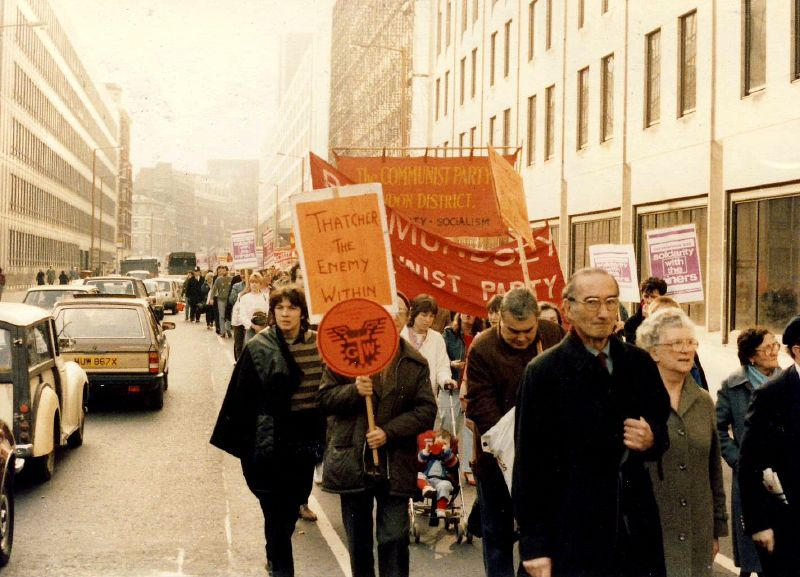
Miners' strike rally in London, 1984

However the miners' strike of 1984–1985 prefigured the end of most of the UK's coal mining. The exploitation of North Sea gas and oil brought in substantial tax and export revenues to aid the new economic boom. This was also the time that the IRA took the issue of Northern Ireland to Great Britain, maintaining a prolonged bombing campaign on the British mainland.

After the economic boom of the 1980s a brief but severe recession occurred between 1990 and 1992 following the economic chaos of Black Wednesday under government of John Major, who had succeeded Margaret Thatcher in 1990. However the rest of the 1990s saw the beginning of a period of continuous economic growth that lasted over 16 years. It was expanded under the so-called New Labour government of Tony Blair following his landslide election victory in 1997. The rejuvenated Labour party abandoned its commitment to policies including nuclear disarmament and nationalisation of key industries, and no reversal of the Thatcher-led union reforms. It emphasised an appeal to the better-educated voter.

From 1964 up until 1996, income per head had doubled, while ownership of various household goods had significantly increased. By 1996, two-thirds of households owned cars, 82% had central heating, most people owned a VCR, and one in five houses had a home computer. In 1971, 9% of households had no access to a shower or bathroom, compared with only 1% in 1990; largely due to demolition or modernisation of older properties which lacked such facilities. In 1971, only 35% had central heating, while 78% enjoyed this amenity in 1990. By 1990, 93% of households had colour television, 87% had telephones, 86% had washing machines, 80% had deep-freezers, 60% had video-recorders, and 47% had microwave ovens. Holiday entitlements had also become more generous. In 1990, nine out of ten full-time manual workers were entitled to more than four weeks of paid holiday a year, while twenty years previously only two-thirds had been allowed three weeks or more.

The postwar period also witnessed significant improvements in housing conditions. In 1960, 14% of British households had no inside toilet, while in 1967 22% of all homes had no basic hot water supply. By the 1990s, most homes had these amenities together with central heating. From 1996–1997 to 2006–2007, real median household income increased by 20% while real mean household incomes increased by 23%. There has also been a shift towards a service-based economy in the years following the end of the Second World War, with 11% of working people employed in manufacturing in 2006, compared with 25% in 1971.

=== Common Market (EEC), then EU, membership ===
Britain's wish to join the Common Market (as the European Economic Community was known in Britain) was first expressed in July 1961 by the Macmillan government. It was vetoed in 1963 by French President Charles de Gaulle. After initially hesitating over the issue, Harold Wilson's Labour Government lodged the UK's second application (in May 1967) to join the Community. Like the first, though, it was vetoed by de Gaulle.

In 1973, with de Gaulle gone, Conservative Prime Minister Heath negotiated terms for admission and Britain finally joined the Community. In opposition the Labour Party was deeply divided, though its Leader, Harold Wilson, remained in favour. In the 1974 General Election the Labour Party manifesto included a pledge to renegotiate terms for Britain's membership and then hold a referendum on whether to stay in the EC on the new terms. This was a constitutional procedure without precedent in British history. In the subsequent referendum campaign, rather than the normal British tradition of "collective responsibility", under which the government takes a policy position which all cabinet members are required to support publicly, members of the Government (and the Conservative opposition) were free to present their views on either side of the question. A referendum was duly held on 5 June 1975, and the proposition to continue membership was passed with a substantial majority.

The Single European Act (SEA) was the first major revision of the 1957 Treaty of Rome. In 1987, the Conservative government under Margaret Thatcher enacted it into UK law.

The Maastricht Treaty transformed the European Community into the European Union. In 1992, the Conservative government under John Major ratified it, against the opposition of his backbench Maastricht Rebels.

The Lisbon Treaty introduced many changes to the treaties of the Union. Prominent changes included more qualified majority voting in the Council of Ministers, increased involvement of the European Parliament in the legislative process through extended codecision with the Council of Ministers, eliminating the pillar system and the creation of a President of the European Council with a term of two and a half years and a High Representative of the Union for Foreign Affairs and Security Policy to present a united position on EU policies. The Treaty of Lisbon made the Union's human rights charter, the Charter of Fundamental Rights, legally binding. The Lisbon Treaty led to an increase in the voting weight of the UK in the Council of the European Union from 8.4% to 12.4%. In July 2008, the Labour government under Gordon Brown approved the treaty and the Queen ratified it.

=== Devolution for Scotland and Wales ===
On 11 September 1997, the 700th anniversary of the Scottish victory over the English at the Battle of Stirling Bridge, a referendum was held on establishing a devolved Scottish Parliament. This resulted in an overwhelming 'yes' vote both to establishing the parliament and granting it limited tax varying powers. One week later, a referendum in Wales on establishing a Welsh Assembly was also approved but with a very narrow majority. The first elections were held, and these bodies began to operate in 1999. The creation of these bodies has widened the differences between the countries of the United Kingdom, especially in areas like healthcare. It has also brought to the fore the so-called West Lothian question which is a complaint that devolution for Scotland and Wales but not England has created a situation where Scottish and Welsh MPs in the UK Parliament can, in principle, vote on internal matters affecting England alone whereas English MPs have no say in similar matters affecting Scotland and Wales.

== Since 2000 ==
=== War in Afghanistan and Iraq ===
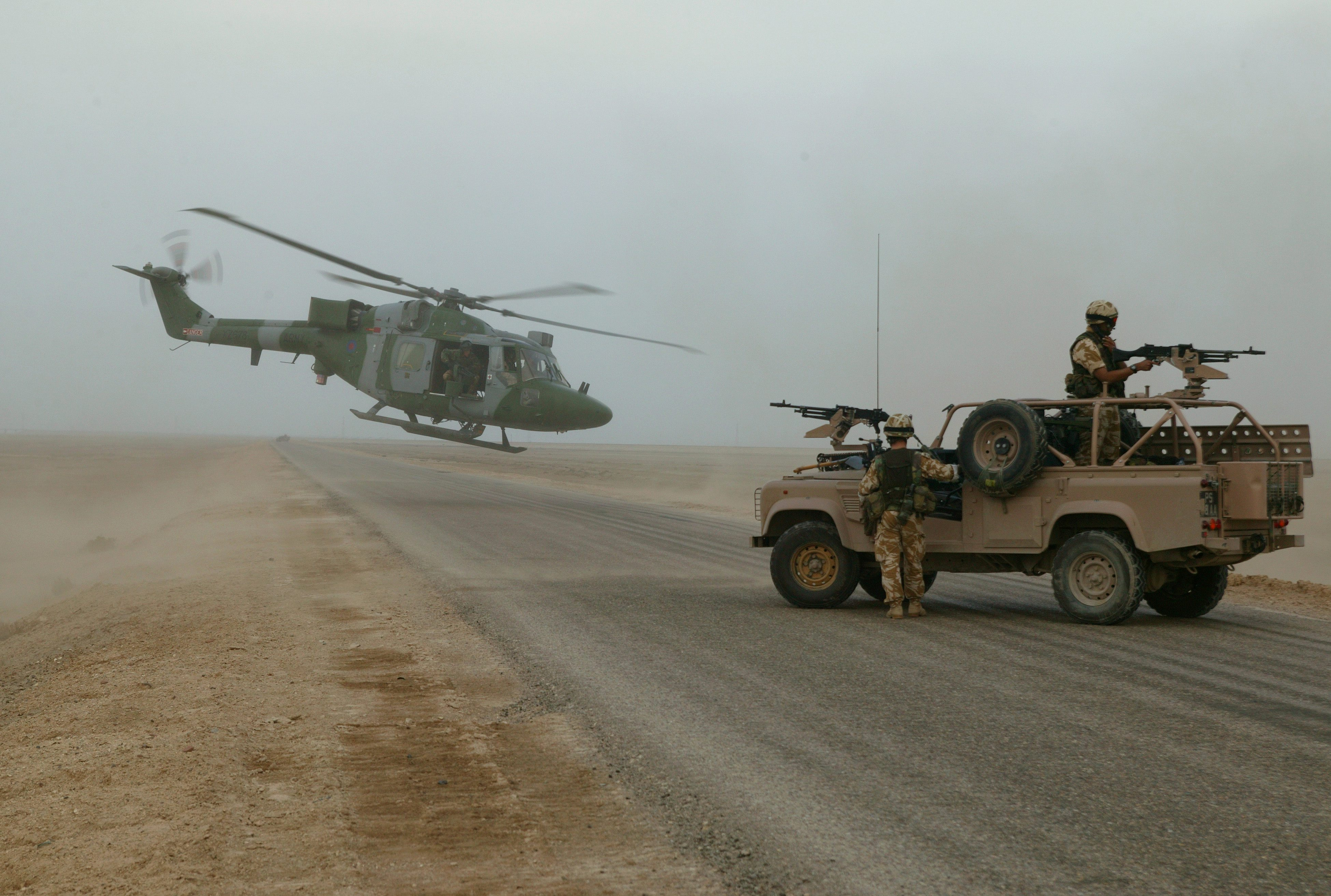
British forces south of Basra International Airport, Iraq, November 2003

In the 2001 General Election, the Labour Party won a second successive victory, though voter turnout dropped to the lowest level for 80 years. The September 11 attacks in the US led to President George W. Bush launching the war on terror, beginning with the invasion of Afghanistan aided by British troops in October 2001. Thereafter, with the US focus shifting to Iraq, Tony Blair convinced the Labour and Conservative MPs to vote in favour of supporting the 2003 invasion of Iraq, despite huge anti-war marches held in London and Glasgow. Forty-six thousand British troops, one-third of the total strength of the Army's land forces, were deployed to assist with the invasion and British forces were responsible for security in southern Iraq. All British forces were withdrawn in 2010.

The Labour Party Prime Minister Tony Blair won the 2005 British general election and a third consecutive term. On 7 July 2005, a series of four suicide bombings struck London, killing 52 commuters along with the four bombers, and injuring hundreds.

=== 2008 economic crisis ===
In the wake of the Great Recession, the economy contracted. The announcement in 2008 that the economy had shrunk for the first time since 1992, ended 16 years of continuous growth. Causes included an end to the easy credit, reduction in consumption and substantial depreciation of sterling (which fell 25% against the euro between January 2008 and January 2009), leading to increased import costs, notably of oil.

On 8 October 2008, the British Government announced a bank rescue package of around £500 billion ($850 billion at the time). The plan comprised three parts: £200 billion to be made available to the banks in the Bank of England's Special Liquidity Scheme; the Government increased the banks' market capitalisation, with an initial £25 billion; and the Government underwrote any eligible lending between British banks up to around £250 billion. With the UK coming out of recession in the fourth quarter of 2009—ending six consecutive quarters of economic decline—the Bank of England decided against further quantitative easing.

=== Scottish independence ===
Following the 2007 Scottish Parliament election, the pro-independence Scottish National Party (SNP) won their first victory. They formed a minority government with plans to hold a referendum before 2011 to seek a mandate "to negotiate with the Government of the United Kingdom to achieve independence for Scotland." Unionist parties responded by establishing the Calman Commission to examine further devolution of powers. Responding to the findings of the review, the UK government issued a white paper in 2009, on new powers that would be devolved to the Scottish Government, notably on how it can raise tax. These proposals would ultimately form the basis of the Scotland Act 2012.

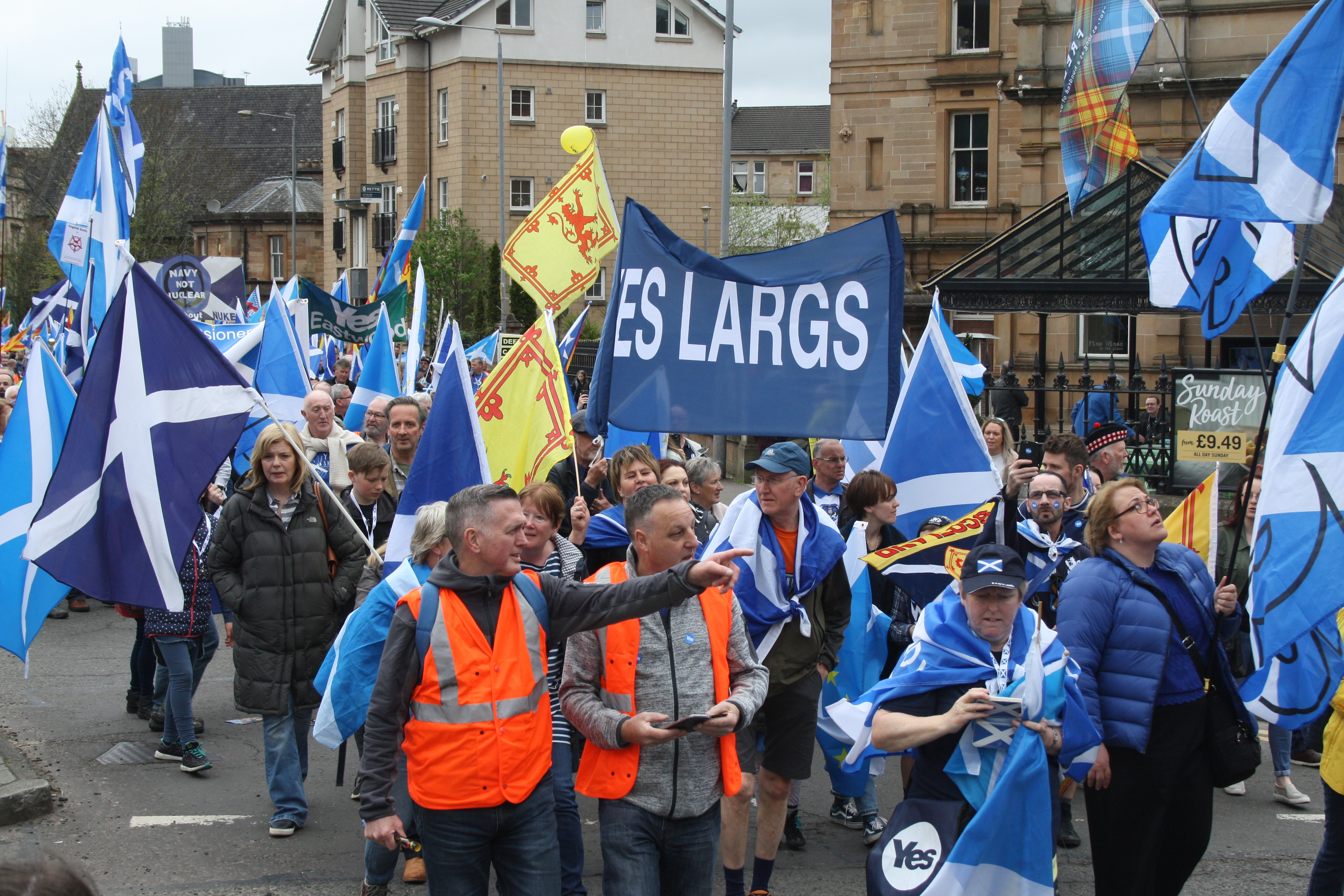
Pro-independence march in Glasgow, Scotland in May 2018

The 2011 election saw a decisive victory for the SNP which was able to form a majority government intent on delivering a referendum on independence. Prime Minister David Cameron guaranteed the UK government would not put any legal or political obstacles in the way of such a referendum. On 18 September 2014, a referendum was held in Scotland on whether to leave the UK. The three UK-wide political parties—Labour, Conservative and Liberal Democrats—campaigned together as part of the Better Together campaign while the pro-independence Scottish National Party was the main force in the Yes Scotland campaign. Days before the vote, with the opinion polls closing, the three Better Together party leaders issued 'The Vow', a promise of more powers for Scotland in the event of a No vote. The referendum resulted in Scotland voting by 55% to 45% to remain part of the UK. First Minister of Scotland Alex Salmond resigned, succeeded by Nicola Sturgeon. Advocating for a second referendum, she would lead the SNP to victory in the 2016 and 2021 elections.

=== 2010 coalition government ===
The 2010 general election resulted in the first hung parliament since 1974, with the Conservative Party winning the largest number of seats, but falling short of the 326 required for a majority. The Conservatives and Liberal Democrats agreed to form the first coalition government for the UK since the Second World War, with David Cameron becoming Prime Minister and Nick Clegg Deputy Prime Minister.

British military aircraft participated in the UN-mandated intervention in the 2011 Libyan civil war, flying 3,000 air sorties against forces loyal to dictator Muammar Gaddafi. 2011 saw England suffer unprecedented rioting in its major cities in August, killing five and causing £200m worth of damage. In October 2011, the prime ministers of the Commonwealth realms voted to grant gender equality in the royal succession. The amendment ended the ban on the monarch marrying a Catholic.

=== 2015 election ===
The 2015 election was held on 7 May with polls predicting a hung parliament. The Conservative Party won a narrow majority in parliament. The other most significant result was the Scottish National Party winning all but three of the 59 seats in Scotland. This was because of a surge in support following the 2014 independence referendum, and SNP party membership had quadrupled; 1 in every 50 of the population of Scotland was a member.

Labour suffered its worst defeat since 1987, taking only 31% of the votes and losing 40 of its 41 seats in Scotland. The Liberal Democrats lost 49 of their 57 seats, as they were punished for their decision to form a coalition with the Conservatives. The UK Independence Party (UKIP), rallying voters against the EU and uncontrolled immigration, secured 13%, but won only one seat. Cameron had a mandate for his austerity policies to shrink the size of government, and a challenge in dealing with Scotland. Likewise the Green Party saw a rise in support but retained just its one seat.

=== 2016 EU membership referendum ===
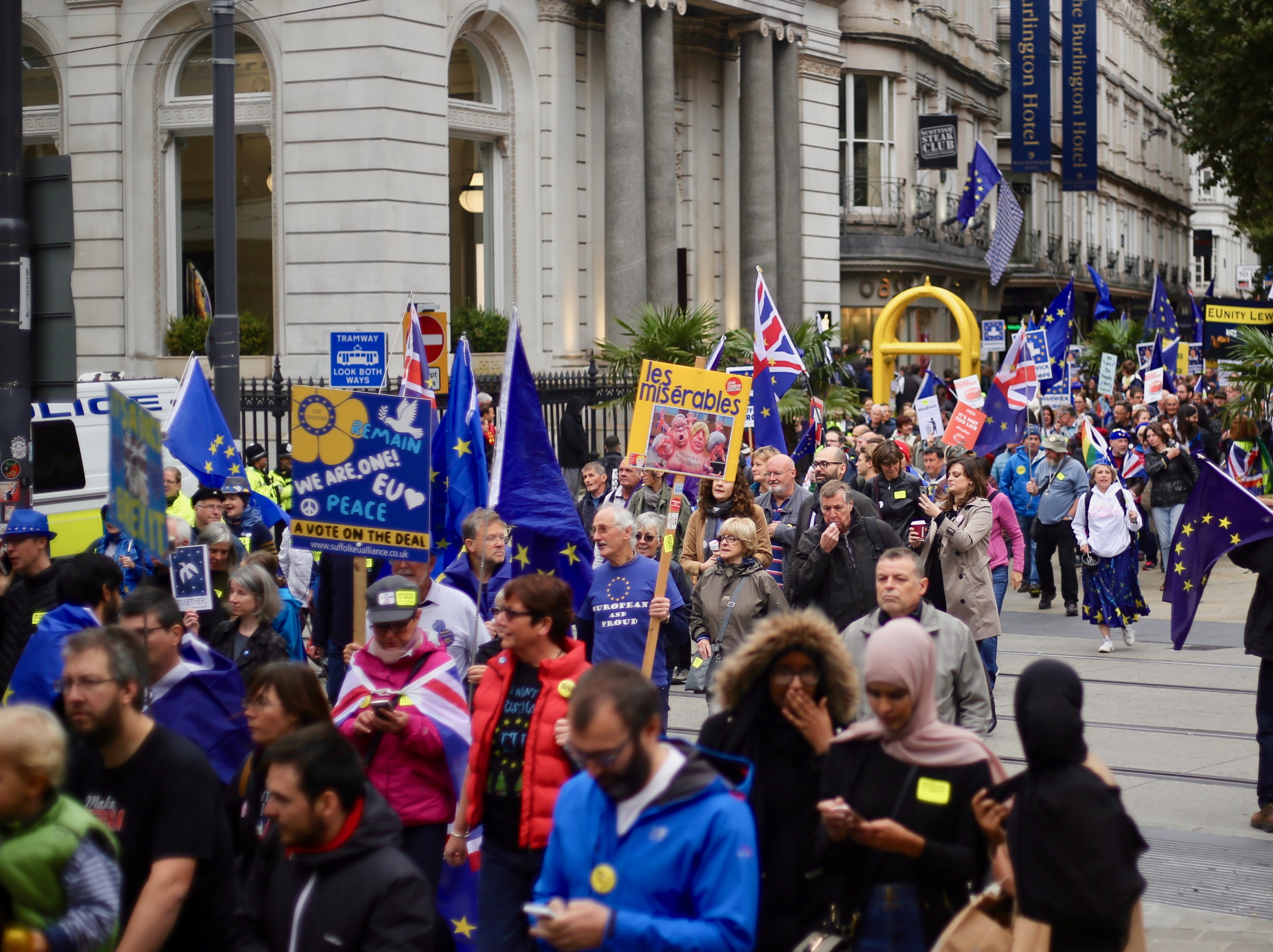
A pro-EU demonstration in Birmingham in September 2018

In February 2016, Prime Minister Cameron announced that a referendum on the UK's membership of the European Union would be held on 23 June 2016, following years of campaigning by eurosceptics. Campaigns by parties supporting both "Remain" (Britain Stronger in Europe) and "Leave" (Vote Leave) focused on concerns regarding trade and the European single market, security, migration and sovereignty. The result of the referendum was in favour of the country leaving the EU with 52% of voters wanting to leave. Cameron resigned, with Theresa May succeeding him as Prime Minister.

The UK remained a member of the EU, but invoked Article 50 of the Lisbon Treaty in March 2017. This started negotiations on a withdrawal agreement, before an exit from the EU (Brexit) intended for March 2019 but later extended, to early 2020.

During the 2016 referendum, Boris Johnson became a leading proponent of Vote Leave. By 2019, Johnson was Prime Minister and pushed hard for an exit on 31 October 2019. Commentator Jonathan Freedland argued in summer 2019 that the Britain was

in the grip of a populism that is trampling on the norms and constraints of liberal democracy, that is contemplating a collective act of self-harm without precedent, that is bracing itself for disruption, shortages, even civil unrest unknown in peacetime. This is not the consequence of unavoidable war or an unforeseen natural disaster, but is entirely of the country's own making.

=== COVID-19 pandemic ===
COVID was confirmed to be spreading in the UK by the end of January 2020 with the first confirmed deaths in March. The country was initially slow in implementing restrictions. Subsequent epidemiological analysis showed that over 1000 lineages of SARS-CoV-2 entered the UK in early 2020 from international travellers, mostly from outbreaks elsewhere in Europe. A legally enforced lockdown was introduced on 23 March. Restrictions were eased in late spring. The UK's epidemic in early 2020 was one of the largest and deadliest worldwide.

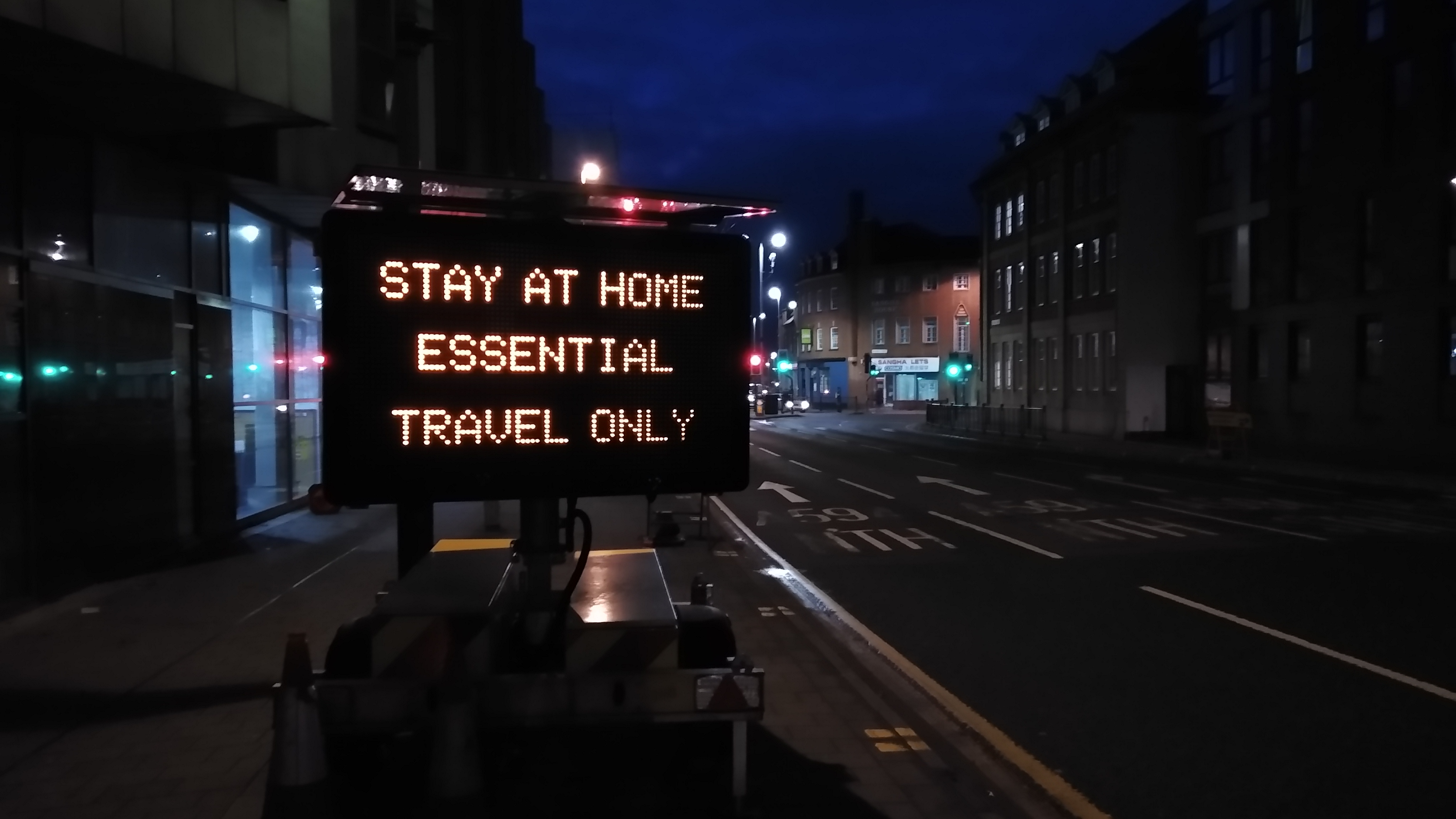
Sign encouraging the public to stay at home and avoid unessential travel in Leicester, January 2021

By the Autumn, cases were again rising. This led to the creation of new regulations along with local lockdowns, in more specific geographic locations than the four nations of the UK. Lockdowns took place in Wales, England and Northern Ireland later that season. Once restrictions were lifted, a novel variant rapidly spread across the UK. The NHS had come under severe strain by late December. This led to a tightening of restrictions.

The first vaccine was approved and began its rollout in the UK in December 2020. By August 2021 more than 75% of adults in the UK were fully vaccinated against COVID. Restrictions began to ease from late February and almost all had ended in Britain by August.

=== 2020s: Post-Covid and Post-Brexit ===
In 2022, the UK government faced multiple crises. The Partygate scandal, involving lockdown rule breaches by government officials, led to fines, including for Prime Minister Boris Johnson and Chancellor of the Exchequer Rishi Sunak. Johnson faced calls to resign, and after the Chris Pincher scandal, which resulted in 62 of the United Kingdom's 179 government ministers, parliamentary private secretaries, trade envoys, and party vice-chairmen resigning from their positions, Johnson finally stepped down as Prime Minister and Conservative Leader in July 2022.

Liz Truss succeeded Johnson, but her September mini-budget triggered market instability, leading to the dismissal of Chancellor of the Exchequer Kwasi Kwarteng on the 14th October, serving 38 days, making him the second-shortest-serving holder of the office. Truss then resigned later in October, serving 49 days, making her the shortest serving British Prime Minister in history (followed by George Canning who died 119 days into his Premiership in 1827).

Truss was succeeded by former Chancellor Rishi Sunak, who became the first Asian Prime Minister on the 25th October 2022. Sunak had came second to Truss in the Conservative Leadership election between July and September 2022, and was unopposed in the subsequent Conservative Leadership Election in October 2022.

On the 4 July 2024, the Labour Party won a landslide victory in that year's general election, meaning Labour Party Leader and Opposition leader Keir Starmer became Britain's new Prime Minister. The election was Labour's third-best showing in the party's history, and its best since 2001, however it was also the lowest of any governing party on record, making this the least proportional general election in British political history. Meanwhile, the Conservatives suffered their worst-ever defeat, including losing the seats of former prime minister Liz Truss and 12 Cabinet ministers, including Defence Secretary Grant Shapps, Justice Secretary Alex Chalk, and Technology Secretary Michelle Donelan.

In 2026, a leadership crisis emerged within the Labour Party, amid public and internal party dissatisfaction with Prime Minister Keir Starmer and his government. It led to Starmer announcing his resignation on the 22nd June, being replaced by Andy Burnham as Labour Leader on 17th July, after winning a uncontested leadership election, and appointed by King Charles III as Prime Minister on the 20th July. Burnham was the seventh Prime Minister in ten years since 2016, succeeding David Cameron (2010 – 2016), Theresa May (2016 – 2019), Boris Johnson (2019 – 2022), Liz Truss (September – October 2022), Rishi Sunak (2022 – 2024), and Keir Starmer (2024 – 2026).

== See also ==
- Historiography of the British Empire
- Historiography of the United Kingdom

=== By region ===
- England
- Northern Ireland
- Scotland (Timeline)
- Wales

=== By topic ===
- Culture
- Economy
- Foreign relations
  - Diplomacy
- Gambling
- Journalism
- Military
- Monarchy
- Prime Ministers
- Sport
- Women

=== Other topics ===
- Politics
- Religion
