= List of Afrofuturist films =

Compilation of Afrofuturist films

In film, Afrofuturism is the incorporation of black people's history and culture in science fiction film and related genres. The Guardian's Ashley Clark said the term Afrofuturism has "an amorphous nature" but that Afrofuturist films are "united by one key theme: the centering of the international black experience in alternate and imagined realities, whether fiction or documentary; past or present; science fiction or straight drama". The New York Times's Glenn Kenny said, "Afrofuturism is more prominent in music and the graphic arts than it is in cinema, but there are movies out there that illuminate the notion in different ways."

The 2018 film Black Panther was a major box-office success and contributed to Afrofuturism becoming more mainstream.

== List of films ==
| Film | Year | Description |
|---|---|---|
| Afronauts | 2014 | The film, directed by Ghanaian filmmaker Frances Bodomo, features the Zambia Space Academy that works to beat the United States to the moon as the latter prepares its Apollo 11 launch. |
| Air Conditioner | 2020 | The Angolan film directed by Fradique revolves around the air-conditioners mysteriously starting to fall in the city of Luanda. The Guardian called the film Afrofuturist, writing, "It's a magic-realist parable with the thinnest shrinkwrapping of sci-fi" that shows how "the service guarantee runs out on the technology". |
| Black Is King | 2020 | The musical film and video album directed, written, and executive produced by American singer Beyoncé. Scholar Kinitra D. Brooks describes the film as "an aural and visual rendering of Afrofuturistic Blackness in the 21st century". Brooks said, "Afrofuturism urges Black people to recover their pasts in order to create their own futures. 'Black Is King' imagines what it looks like to be there, whole and healed." |
| Black Panther | 2018 | The superhero film, directed by Ryan Coogler, stars the comic book character Black Panther who is the king of the fictional kingdom of Wakanda. The film features Afrofuturist themes. |
| Black Panther: Wakanda Forever | 2022 | The superhero film is a sequel to Black Panther. The film explores Afrofuturism "in the way the mantle of Black Panther presumably passes to Princess Shuri". |
| Blade | 1998 | In the superhero film, the human-vampire hybrid Blade, played by black actor Wesley Snipes, protects humanity from evil vampires. |
| Born in Flames | 1983 | The film, directed by Lizzie Borden, is described by Hyperallergic's Jeremy Polacek: "[It] presents the revolution as televised, paraded, reported, and reiterated by pundits and politicians — and yet still incomplete. Socialism may reign in Borden's post-revolutionary America, but so does patriarchy, racism, and sexism." |
| The Brother from Another Planet | 1984 | The science fiction film, directed by John Sayles, features an alien who escapes slavery on "Another Planet" and crash-lands and hides in Harlem. |
| Brown Girl Begins | 2017 | The film is set in Toronto in the near future, and the upper class is protected by a force field. |
| Crumbs | 2015 | The Ethiopian post-apocalyptic film is directed by Miguel Llansó. The plot centers on Gagano, who undertakes a significant journey to overcome his fears in a dystopian world where humanity, having encountered alien life, lives off scavenged remnants. |
| Fast Color | 2018 | In the American superhero film, three generations of women have superpowers and are on the run from the government. |
| Get Out | 2017 | The American psychological horror film, written and directed by Jordan Peele in his directorial debut, features a young Black photographer who visits the family of his white girlfriend and uncovers a conspriacy to transplant the consciousnessses of elderly white people into the bodies of Black victims. Rone Shavers wrote in The New Routledge Companion to Science Fiction that Get Out is among works "which demonstrate that... Afrofuturism has emerged to understand the science-fictional existence that Blacks have always experienced living in the New World - an unreality driven by economic demands, would-be science, and skin color". |
| Hello, Rain | 2018 | The short film, directed by C.J. Obasi features a Scientist-Witch, who through an alchemical combination of juju and technology creates wigs which grant her and her friends supernatural powers. But when their powers grow uncontrollable, she must stop them by any means. It is based on the short story Hello, Moto by Nigerian-American author, Nnedi Okorafor. |
| I Snuck Off the Slave Ship | 2019 | The sci-fi documentary short film, co-directed by Lonnie Holley and Cyrus Moussavi, explores Holley's imaginative journey through time to confront historical trauma and the legacy of slavery in America. |
| Kwaku Ananse | 2013 | The short film, directed by Akosua Adoma Owusu, shows a parallel between the Ghanaian fable "Anansi the Spider" and a young girl's life. |
| The Last Angel of History | 1996 | The film, produced by Black Audio Film Collective and directed by John Akomfrah, combines science fiction and essay approaches and features a time-traveling "data thief" who searches for code to reveal his future. |
| A Love Letter to the Ancestors From Chicago | 2017 | The short film is directed by Ytasha Womack. It "demonstrates that rhythm and dance bridge all times and spaces". |
| Memory Room 451 | 1997 | The film, produced by the Black Audio Film Collective, is set in a dystopian world and presented as a documentary in which a time traveler interviews people of an earlier era. |
| Monsoons Over The Moon | 2015 | The two-part short film, directed by Kenyan filmmaker Dan Muchina, is set in Nairobi in a dystopian future. A street gang fights against totalitarianism by freeing young people trapped in the system. |
| Neptune Frost | 2021 | The film is set in a Burundian village that is made from recycled parts of computers. It features a romance between a coltan miner and an intersex runaway. |
| An Oversimplification of Her Beauty | 2012 | The film, directed by Terence Nance, is described by Ashley Clark as a "mash-up of integrated fiction/nonfiction shorts, home video, voiceover narration and stock footage" including "plentiful, head-spinningly trippy animation sequences that place the film squarely in Afrofuturistic territory". |
| Pumzi | 2009 | The short film, directed by Wanuri Kahiu, is Kenya's first science fiction film. |
| Ratnik | 2019 | The Nigerian science-fiction thriller film, directed by Dimeji Ajibola, features a soldier who comes home from World War III to find her sister deathly ill as a result of a chemical substance. |
| Robots of Brixton | 2011 | The computer-generated short film, directed by Kibwe Tavares, re-contextualizes the 1981 Brixton riot in a dystopian future where robots riot against human police forces. |
| Les Saignantes (English: Those Who Bleed) | 2005 | The erotic science fiction thriller is directed by Cameroonian filmmaker Jean-Pierre Bekolo. The film, set in a futuristic 2025 Cameroon, follows two women navigating a surreal and politically charged landscape after a high-ranking official dies during a sexual encounter. |
| Sankofa | 1993 | The film, directed by Ethiopian-born Haile Gerima, features a contemporary model who, during a photo shoot, suddenly finds herself on a plantation in the Southern United States during the plantation era. |
| See You Yesterday | 2019 | The time-travel film with a social-justice narrative features two black teenagers from Brooklyn trying to use time travel to change the world. |
| The Sin Seer | 2015 | A cop and a person who can "see" others' sins work together to solve cases, but one case leads the gifted person to face her past. |
| Sorry to Bother You | 2018 | The American science fiction black comedy film, written and directed by Boots Riley in his directorial debut, features a Black telemarketer in an alternate present-day Oakland who adopts a "white voice" to rise through his company and uncovers a corporate conspiracy involving the genetic modification of workers into human-horse hybrids. Jamie Sexton wrote, "While Sorry to Bother You is more obviously an Afrosurrealist text, it can also be positioned as an Afrofuturist text in some ways through taking place in an alternate reality." |
| Space Is the Place | 1974 | The film, directed by John Coney, is a science-fiction take on the real-life musician Sun Ra and his crew The Arkestra. Ashley Clark said Ra plays "a cosmic card game" with a megapimp "to determine the fate of the black race". Clark said, "What follows is a brilliant and bizarre melange of comedy, musical performance and occasionally lurid blaxploitation aesthetics. It also, crucially, has a number of serious points to make about the plight of young urban blacks in a harsh, post-civil rights climate." |
| Spider-Man: Into the Spider-Verse | 2018 | The animated superhero film follows Miles Morales becoming Spider-Man after the death of the original Spider-Man, Peter Parker, in his universe. Morales also teams up with other Spider-People, including an alternate version of Parker, to defeat Kingpin and return them to their home realities. |
| Steal Away | 2025 | The Canadian-Belgian film, directed by Clement Virgo, is adapted from Karolyn Smardz Frost's non-fiction book Steal Away Home. Set in an unnamed country that blends antebellum and dystopian imagery, it follows Cécile, a teenager who arrives with her mother to work on the estate of a wealthy woman harbouring a dark secret. A review in Screen Daily described the film as an "ambitious afrofuturist thriller". |
| Supa Modo | 2018 | In the feature film, a nine-year-old girl from a Kenyan village has a terminal illness and dreams of becoming a superhero. Her village helps her realize her dream. 14East said of the film's Afrofuturist touch, "There is a very mysterious element of magic realism and fantasy." |
| Swimming In Your Skin Again | 2015 | The short film is directed by Terence Nance. 14East described it as "a film that leans toward experimental stylistically, its content is very thematic and its sequences are dreamlike... [and] speculates what could be some major issues in the future if we do not respect nature". |
| T | 2019 | The short film, directed by Keisha Rae Witherspoon, follows three mourning participants in Miami's annual T Ball, where attendees gather to showcase R.I.P. t-shirts and creative costumes made in tribute to their deceased loved ones. |
| They Charge for the Sun | 2017 | The short film, directed by Terence Nance, is set in a future where people live at night to avoid harmful sun rays and in which melanin comes into play. |
| To Catch a Dream | 2015 | The Kenyan surrealist short film, written and directed by Jim Chuchu, features a grieving widow who has nightmares and tries a mystical remedy to end them. |
| Touch | 2013 | The short film, directed by Shola Amoo, is set in the near future. |
| Touki Bouki | 1973 | The Senegalese road movie is directed by Djibril Diop Mambéty. The New York Times's Glenn Kenny said, "The movie is replete with such purposeful disjointedness, the better to articulate space-time dissociations." |
| Trafik d'Info | 2005 | The film, directed by Janluk Stanislas, was shot in Guadelope and is considered the first science fiction film to be shot in the Caribbean. |
| Welcome II the Terrordome | 1995 | The film, directed by Ngozi Onwurah, is set in an inner-city slum in a dystopian near-future. The film is the first directed by a black British woman to be released in theaters. |
| White Out, Black In | 2014 | The science fiction documentary, directed by Adirley Queirós, is set in Brazil and follows three men who deal with a past tragedy. |
| A Wrinkle in Time | 2018 | The multiracial adaptation of the 1962 science fantasy novel A Wrinkle in Time has, according to author and filmmaker Ytasha Womack, an Afrofuturistic signature of "strong female" characters. |
| Yeelen (English: Brightness) | 1987 | The Malian film, directed by Souleymane Cissé "follows a young mage on a journey to confront his power-mad father". The New York Times's Glenn Kenny said of the film in the context of Afrofuturism, "Mr. Cissé's languid but mindful pacing and his indifference to Western film language conventions on space and time transitions also contribute to the movie's distinction." |

== See also ==
- Kizazi Moto: Generation Fire, a 2023 Afrofuturist series on Netflix
- My Dad the Bounty Hunter, a 2023 Afrofuturist animated children's program
