= Tandis Jenhudson =

- Born: November 20, 1979 (age 46)
- Genres: Film scores, classical, electronica
- Occupations: Composer, musician, medical doctor
- Instruments: Piano, Multi instrumentalist, Synthesizer
- Website: www.tandismusic.com

Tandis Jenhudson (born 1979) is a Emmy and BAFTA-nominated British composer, musician and medical doctor, best known for his work on film and television soundtracks. He has also received two Royal Television Society award nominations and is the first composer honoured as a BAFTA Breakthrough Brit through which he was mentored by Ennio Morricone.

== Early life and education ==
Tandis was born in Clapham, London in 1979 and attended St George's Hanover Square Primary School, and the London Nautical School and Christ's College, Finchley secondary schools.

Despite his early interest in music, he studied medicine at UCL and divides his time between medicine and music. He composed soundtracks for numerous short films during his early medical career, one of which was nominated for a BAFTA Cymru award in 2005.

In a 2014 interview, with PRS for Music's M-Magazine he said "I was obsessed with TV themes when I was a kid in the eighties and would even dance to some of them when they came on: "Ski Sunday, Dallas, The A-Team, Grange Hill, Airwolf, Doctor Who, Knight Rider, and Doogie Howser, M.D." He studied piano achieving Grade 8 although describes himself as a largely self-taught composer, stating "most of my musical development has come from listening to and dissecting other people's music" citing Mozart's Eine kleine Nachtmusik and Michael Jackson as examples.

== Film and television work ==
In 2013, he received his first television broadcast credit for The March, a BBC/PBS documentary narrated by Denzel Washington which received a BAFTA nomination at the 2014 British Academy Television Awards. Directed by John Akomfrah and executive-produced by Robert Redford The March is about the historic 1963 March on Washington for Jobs and Freedom – largely remembered for Martin Luther King's famous and iconic "I Have a Dream" speech.

In March 2015, Tandis was named laureate and winner in the media composer category at the first International MediaMusic competition in Moscow, for which film composer Ennio Morricone served as honorary chairman. In May he was revealed as one of the judges for the 60th Anniversary Ivor Novello Awards, alongside Gary Barlow and Guy Chambers. In the same year he scored the soundtrack to director Christopher Riley's National Geographic Channel film Hubble's Cosmic Journey.

In 2016, he composed the soundtrack for 'The Traffickers' an eight-part documentary TV series produced by Simon Chinn (winner of two Academy Awards for Searching for Sugar Man and Man On Wire) and Jonathan Chinn.

In 2018, he scored Civilisations, a 9-part art history television series produced by the BBC in association with PBS as a follow-up to the original 1969 landmark series Civilisation by Kenneth Clark. It was presented and narrated by Simon Schama, Mary Beard and David Olusoga. Jenhudson's soundtrack received two nominations at the RTS awards in 2018.

== Video installation work ==
Tandis Jenhudson has created the soundtracks for two multi-screen video installations by the award-winning artist John Akomfrah.

In 2015, he scored Vertigo Sea, a 3-screen triptych that explores man's relationship with the sea and its role in the history of slavery, migration, and conflict. It premiered at the 2015 Venice Biennale and has since exhibited at numerous galleries including Arnolfini, the Turner Contemporary and as recently as 2018 at the New Museum of Contemporary Art in New York. It was nominated for a South Bank Sky Arts award in the Visual Arts category.

In 2017, he collaborated with David Julyan to score Purple, a six-screen film about climate change, human communities and the wilderness. It exhibited for 14 weeks at the Barbican in London, receiving a 4-star review from The Telegraph commenting that it offered "ravishing reminders of what we all stand to lose".

== Awards and honours ==
In 2014, he was selected as a BAFTA Breakthrough Brit and as a result was mentored by his lifelong idol Ennio Morricone.

In 2018, he was nominated for two Royal Television Society awards for Civilisations in the categories of Original Score and Original Title Music.

== Selected works ==
Year	Title	Format	Platform	Director	Notes
2006	Love You, Joseff Hughes	Short Film		Dan Hartley	Nominated: BAFTA Cymru
2013	The March	Feature Documentary	BBC Two PBS	John Akomfrah	Narrated by Denzel Washington, exec-produced by Robert Redford Nominated: BAFTA (best factual)
2015	Hubble's Cosmic Journey	Feature Documentary	National Geographic	Christopher Riley	Narrated by Neil deGrasse Tyson Nominated: Emmy Award
2015	Vertigo Sea	Video Installation		John Akomfrah	Nominated: South Bank Sky Arts Award
2016	The Traffickers	8-part TV series	Fusion TV	Various	Lightbox Productions (exec producer Simon Chinn) Winner: The AIBs; Asian Media Awards
2017	Stalkers	Feature Documentary	BBC One	Kat English	Produced by Wild Pictures
2017	Purple	Video Installation		John Akomfrah	Premiered at Barbican Curve, London
2018	Food Exposed	8-part TV series	Fusion TV	Various	Produced by Lightbox (executive producer Simon Chinn)
2018	Civilisations	8-part TV series	BBC Two PBS	Various	Produced by NutopiaPresented by Simon Schama Mary Beard and David Olusoga; Nominated: RTS Award (Best Original Score and Best Title Music)
2019	Hatton Garden: Inside Job	Feature Documentary	ITV	Tim Conrad	ITV (produced by Optomen) - presented by Ross Kemp
2019	Cajun Navy	Feature Documentary	Discovery Channel	James Newton	Produced by Lightbox (exec producer Simon Chinn)
2019	The Cameron Years	2-part TV series	BBC One	Ian Leese	BBC1 (exec producer Denys Blakeway)
2020	Tigers: Hunting the Traffickers	Feature Documentary	BBC Two	Laura Warner	BBC2 Natural World (produced by Grain Media); Nominated - Grierson Award (Best Natural History Documentary)
2021	Joanna Lumley and the Human Swan	Feature Documentary	ITV	Ian Leese	ITV
2022	Jeremy Kyle Show: Death on Daytime	2-part TV series	Channel 4	Kira Phillips	Nominated: BAFTA (best factual series); RTS (best doc series / best director); Grierson (best doc series); Broadcast Awards (best doc series)
2022	Patagonia: Life at the Edge of the World	6-part TV series	CNN SKY	Various	Plimsoll Productions (exec producer Martha Holmes) Nominated: EMMY (outstanding narrator Pedro Pascal)
2022	The Disappearance of April Jones	3-part TV series	Channel 4	John Incledon	Nominated: BAFTA Cymru (best doc series)
2022	Charlie Mackesy: The Boy, the Mole, the Fox, the Horse and Me	Feature Documentary	Apple TV+ BBC Two	Clare Sturges	Nominated: BAFTA Cymru (best director)
2023	Inside Iran: The Fight for Freedom	Feature Documentary	ITV	Gesbeen Mohammad	Hard Cash Productions
2023	David Holmes: The Boy Who Lived	Feature Documentary	HBO SKY	Dan Hartley	Produced by Lightbox (exec producer Simon Chinn)
2023	Putin and Ukraine's Stolen Children	Feature Documentary	BBC One	Robin Barnwell	Top Hat Productions
