= Vertigo Sea (2015 video installation) =

Video installation created by John Akomfrah

Vertigo Sea is a 48-minute immersive three-channel video installation created by the British artist and filmmaker John Akomfrah in 2015. It is a meditation on man's relationship with the sea and explores issues including the history of slavery, migration, conflict, and ecological concerns such as whale and polar bear hunting and nuclear testing. It combines original footage filmed on the Isle of Skye, the Faroe Islands and the Northern regions of Norway, with archival material primarily from the BBC Natural History Unit. It also draws inspiration from two literary works: Moby-Dick by Herman Melville and the poem Whale Nation by Heathcote Williams. It premiered at the 56th Venice Biennale in 2015 which was curated by Okwui Enwezor.

== Exhibition history ==
- Venice Biennale (Venice) May - November 2015
- Arnolfini (Bristol, England) January - April 2016
- Kunsthallen Nikolaj (Copenhagen) February - May 2016
- The Exchange (Penzance, UK) April - June 2016
- CoCA (Christchurch, New Zealand) May - August 2016
- Design Exchange (Toronto) October 2016
- Turner Contemporary (Kent, UK) October 2016 - January 2017
- Whitworth (Manchester, UK) March - July 2017
- University of Melbourne (Melbourne, Australia) April - July 2017
- Talbot Rice Gallery (Edinburgh) October 2017 - January 2018
- SFMOMA (San Francisco) March - September 2018
- New Museum (New York City) June - September 2018
- The Store X 'Strange Days' (London) October - December 2018
- The Phillips Collection (Washington) June - September 2019
- The Johnson Museum (New York) September - December 2019
- Secession (Vienna) February - June 2020
- The Rooms (St John's, Canada) February - July 2020
- Seattle Art Museum (Seattle) March - September 2020
- CAAC (Seville) November 2020 - March 2021
- MAC Montréal (Montreal) February - April 2021
- Fundació Antoni Tàpies (Barcelona) February - June 2021
- Towner Gallery (Eastbourne, UK) May - September 2021
- National Museum Cardiff (Wales, UK) October 2021 - June 2023
- Museum of Fine Arts, Boston (Boston) November 9, 2024 - November 9, 2025

== Soundtrack ==
The original soundtrack was composed by Tandis Jenhudson.

== Reception ==
In its review of the 2015 Venice Biennale, The Guardian called Vertigo Sea as a "pained lyric to a passing world". The Guardian's Adrian Searle provided a more in-depth review for the 2016 Arnolfini exhibition in Bristol, describing it as a "visual assault...ravishing and awful, sublime and depressing".

The Arts Desk described it as an "epic meditation on mankind's relationship with the watery world" and "an elegantly choreographed 48-minute montage across three screens". It concluded that "there's no stronger way to get people to act than by showing what we stand to lose".

In its review of the 2017 Whitworth exhibition in Manchester, the New African magazine stated that it is "an enthralling montage of perplexing images and sounds, it consistently throws the viewer into scrutinising current heightened concerns on race, identity and migration".

Afterimage described the "constant shifting and layering of sound and image across three large screens" that "creates an immersive spectacle and affecting experience that compels viewers' eyes, ears and emotions." It also highlighted the film's soundtrack, with sound borrowed from tragic opera arias, overlaid and intermingling with natural sounds and a "melancholic ambient score by British composer Tandis Jenhudson, which together suggest a funerary requiem".

In their reviews of the 2018 Strange Days exhibition in London, Time Out stated that Vertigo Sea "steals the show with its lyrical, poignant and often shocking meditation on the Atlantic as a place of historical trauma, while the Evening Standard's Ben Luke described it as an "epic, elemental three-screen masterpiece".

The Cornell Daily Sun, in its 2019 review of the Johnson museum exhibition, described it as "stunning both in its beauty and horror" stating that "Akomfrah creates a visual installation that is overwhelming in its size and stimulus but with the purpose of remembering that the world remains a truly complex and weirdly beautiful place".

In 2020, ARTnews ranked Vertigo Sea 2nd among John Akomfrah's five best works, one behind his 1986 film Handsworth Songs.
