= Writing Black Britain =

2000 anthology edited by James Procter

Writing Black Britain 1948–1998 is an anthology of black British writings published in 2000 and edited by James Procter. The selection of writings includes many well-known writers such as Stuart Hall and Paul Gilroy. This is an interdisciplinary collection and contains a variety of writings that discuss different forms of representation, i.e. films, music, and photography. It is centred on works of the diaspora, including Caribbean, African, and South Asian experiences. This collection is the first of its kind and critically engages with both the construction and community of "black Britain" and power relations. Every writer has something to say about their own positionality and how they've come to theorize black Britain.

The book is subdivided into three main parts covering distinct time periods: 1948 to late 1960s, later 1960s to mid-1980s, and mid-1980s to late 1990s. Each main part is framed by an introduction and then divided between "literature" and "essays and documents".

While many anthologies following were filled with pieces written specifically for the anthology's publication, Writing Black Britain is a collection of previously published text. These pieces were initially compiled in order to prevent misinterpretation and inaccuracy about Black communities in Britain and Germany. Because of this, the anthology was aimed at speaking to mainstream white audiences in order to highlight the Black presence in European life. When reading and discussing Writing Black Britain, it is important to keep in mind the fact that it was designed for use in university coursework and the potential effect this may have had on what materials were and were not included for publication.

== Periodising post-war black Britain ==
In Writing Black Britain we are reminded of the accountability we all need to share in how we tell history. This anthology contains literature that begins with 1948, an important year because of the HMT Empire Windrush. However, Writing Black Britain recognizes the genealogy of black Britain pre-1948. The introduction states, "an introduction to the project of this anthology requires both an account of the historical conditions in which it is embedded and a consideration of the problems and potentialities of recuperating a 'block' (1948–98) of black British literary and cultural production 'anterior' to it. I will now turn to that symbolic year, 1948, as a means of grounding this Introduction." This allows the collection to present a critical look at what has also been forgotten in the foregrounding of the year 1948. It serves as a reminder of the continuity within the anthology's timeline of violence against black racialized bodies. The book goes into details of violence against black racialized bodies, such as the killings that took place on the account of race. Yet, the sole presence of blacks in Britain is not the only minority discussed; there is also the discussion of South Asian, African, and Caribbean cultural production within Britain.

== Themes ==
- Migration
- Cultural appropriation
- Racism
- Policies of urban removal/renewal
- Segregation
- Historical amnesia
- Police brutality
- Solidarity
- Post-colonialism
- Identity politics
- Survival
- Representation

== The Caribbean Artists Movement ==
This anthology engages with blackness and the Caribbean Community in Britain, especially looking at migration and how art serves as resistance. The Caribbean Artists Movement began in Britain, giving this discussion local relevance. In the first section, Claudia Jones speaks to the cultural identity formation of Afro-Caribbeans.

== Feminism within Writing Black Britain ==
Recognizing the centrality of black women struggles within the formation of a black Britain, within this anthology black women speak to power differentials and intersectionality in their essay. As Hazel Carby states, "The fact that black women are subject to the 'simultaneous' oppression of patriarchy, class, and 'race' is the prime reason for not employing parallels that render their position and experience not only marginal but also invisible."

== The Handsworth Songs Letters ==
The anthology brings conversations to light, including the conversation/debate that occurred between Stuart Hall, Darcus Howe, and Salman Rushdie. The Black Audio Film Collective released their film Handsworth Songs (1986), and there was much to say about it and its implications. The film looks at the "riots" of 1985 in Handsworth and South London.
