= BFI Southbank =

Cinema in London, England

Coordinates: 51.5072°N 0.1157°W

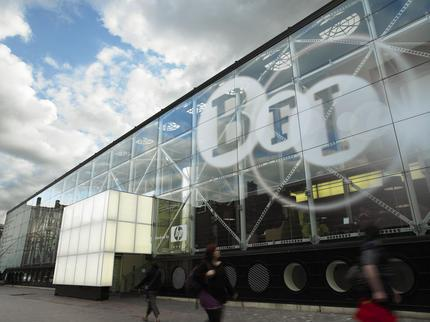
BFI Southbank

BFI Southbank (formerly known as the National Film Theatre from 1951 to 2007) is the leading repertory cinema in the United Kingdom, specialising in seasons of classic, independent and non-English language films. It is operated by the British Film Institute. Forbes called its largest cinema, NFT1, "one of the crown jewels of the London film scene".

== History ==
Old NFT logo

The National Film Theatre was initially opened in a temporary building (the Telecinema) at the Festival of Britain in 1951 and moved to its present location in 1957, replacing the Thameside restaurant on the site. It opened for the first BFI London Film Festival on 16 October 1957. Later, the Southbank Centre expanded its buildings to meet the National Film Theatre from the south, while the National Theatre occupies the area to the northeast. A second screen was added on 21 September 1970.

In 1988, a new building was constructed for the Museum of the Moving Image between the National Film Theatre and Belvedere Road. Designed by Avery Associates Architects, it was built under the Waterloo Bridge approach and expanded during construction into a former subterranean car park. It remained separate from the National Film Theatre, with separate entrances. The museum was closed in 1999.

On 14 March 2007, the National Film Theatre was relaunched as BFI Southbank in considerably enlarged premises, taking over space that had been used by the museum. The enlargement works were due to start in the summer of 2005, but were delaying owing to funding problems. When it reopened, in addition to the three pre-existing cinemas, the complex included a new small cinema (the studio), a médiathèque, a contemporary art gallery dedicated to the moving image (the BFI Gallery), a shop, and a bar and restaurant run by Benugo.

The cinema also serves as the main venue of the BFI Flare LGBTIQ+ Film Festival.

In 2023, Forbes called its largest cinema, NFT1, "one of the crown jewels of the London film scene".

== Location and architectural details ==
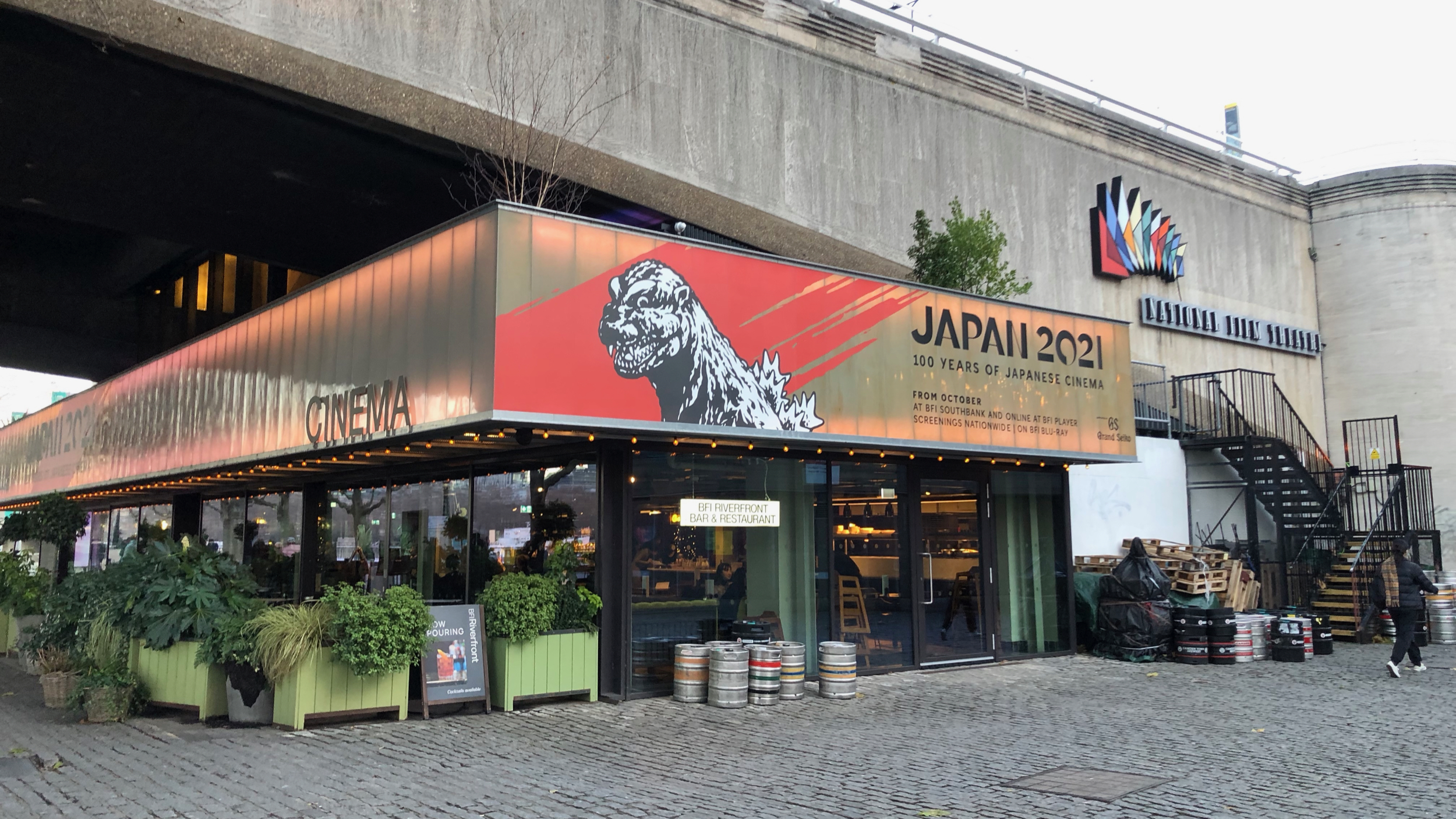
BFI Restaurant with the Waterloo Bridge above

BFI Southbank is sited below the southern end of Waterloo Bridge, forming part of the cultural complex on the South Bank of the River Thames in London. The site comprises four cinemas, as well as a library, shop, café, restaurant and exhibition space. It also has a large bar area in the foyer where smaller performances are sometimes held.

The National Film Theatre was designed by Norman Engleback, an architect within London County Council.

In 2022 the architects behind the redevelopment of the Southbank promenade entrance received London and National awards from the Royal Institute of British Architects for their design, which includes a "grand canopy of cast fibreglass" which "glows boldly like a cinema screen".

The BFI Southbank is the only cinema in the United Kingdom that is licensed to publicly screen Nitrate film.

== See also ==
- Aeolian Tower
- London in film
