= Black British identity =

Black British identity is the objective or subjective state of perceiving oneself as a black British person and as relating to being black British. Researched and discussed across a wide variety of mediums; the identity usually intersects with, and is driven by, black African and Afro-Caribbean heritage, and association with African diaspora and culture.

== Background ==
A emergent black British identity has been acknowledged and researched in a diverse range of forms, in scholarly or journalistic publications, and works of media. Writing within the diasporic context of both African and Afro-Caribbean heritage, academic Eddie Chambers has suggested that the identity evolved across decades, after the mid-century arrival of British subjects from former colonies:

How did a distinct and powerful Black British identity emerge? In the 1950s, when many Caribbean migrants came to Britain, there was no such recognised entity as 'Black Britain'; Yet by the 1980s, the cultural landscape had radically changed, and a remarkable array of creative practices such as theatre, poetry, literature, music and the visual arts gave voice to striking new articulations of Black-British identity.

An analysis with ethnogenesis similarities from historian Kobena Mercer, who has proposed that black Britons manifested their own identity in the 1980s through activism and self-realisation, has examined that conscious nature of the identity in the United Kingdom, and suggesting that the group's black identity "showed that identities are not found but made; that they are not just there, waiting to be discovered in a vocabulary of Nature, but that they have to be culturally and politically constructed through political antagonism and cultural struggle". Black British literature has been analyzed as one of the major contributions towards the emerging identity. In the 21st-century, novelists Diana Evans and Helen Oyeyemi's impact on black British identity has been explored in scholarly research. Dr Charlotte Beyer has studied the concept in Andrea Levy's and Joan Riley's works. The authors, both of Jamaican ancestry, have been described as two of the many authors that have been instrumental in the literary expression of identity for black Britons.

== History ==
Referring to the forging of a new ethnic group and its consciousness, sociologist Stuart Hall wrote in 1997 "that something as distinctive as a new ethnicity, a new Black British identity is emerging". In 2005, anthropologist Raymond Codrington wrote how, in certain contexts, black British identity suffered from comparison with a longer-established "black American-ness" in the United States. In 2011, the BBC published an article examining the impacts of the New Cross house fire, and whether the 1981 incident, which killed a number of black Britons, contributed to the advanced development of black British identity.

In 2016, historian David Olusoga presented Black and British: A Forgotten History. The four-part BBC series explored how ongoing racialised events, such as the 1981 Toxteth riots, helped to shape the identity. In 2019, Huck magazine featured British drama film The Last Tree, discussing the plot - a Nigerian British foster child growing up in Britain - and its intersection the group identity. In October 2019, the UK Ministry of Justice published a blog-piece from an MoJ Civil Service employee, describing her black British identity. A first for a UK Government department, the article was timed for Black History Month.

Jamaican-born photographer Armet Francis was listed, in a 2019 Museum of London curation, as making a significant contribution to the group's burgeoning identity in the mid-to-late 20th century. In 2020, writer Bernardine Evaristo spoke with CBC Radio regarding the emergence of the black British culture and identities, particularly in the 1990s.

== Academic research ==
A 2008 study, conducted at Florida International University, used a series of questions, which were asked of black British children in London-based secondary schools, in order to measure perceptions of the concept. The interviewees (eighteen individual students aged 11–17) and their responses, were used to indicate associations with, primarily, black British identity, as well as notions and beliefs regarding African diaspora. Diasporic factors have been examined as an important aspect of the development of the identity, such as in the works of historian Eddie Chambers, and in relation to both African and African Caribbean ancestry.
