= The Unfinished Conversation =

2013 film by John Akomfrah

- Directed by: John Akomfrah
- Produced by: Lina Gopaul; David Lawson; Smoking Dogs Films
- Release dates: September 2012 (London Biennial); 26 October 2013 (Tate Britain)
- Running time: 103 minutes
- Country: United Kingdom
- Language: English

The Unfinished Conversation is a 2012 multi-layered three-screen installation directed by John Akomfrah, co-founder of the Black Audio Film Collective. Through his celebrated technique of juxtaposing and layering archive footage with text, music and photographs, Akomfrah crosses the memory landscape of Stuart Hall, Jamaican-born founder of British Cultural Studies, to reflect on the nature and complexities of memory and identity. The Unfinished Conversation was commissioned by Autograph ABP. It opened at Tate Britain, London, on 26 October 2013, following its premiere at Bluecoat during the 2012 Liverpool Biennial.

== Summary ==
The Unfinished Conversation is a journey through theorist Stuart Hall's work and output on radio and television as a post-war immigrant who arrived in England in the first quarter of the 1950s and pioneered in British cultural studies, as the co-founder of the movement together with E. P. Thompson and Raymond Williams of the journal New Left Review. Director John Akomfrah, alongside his fellow Black Audio Film Collective members, was engaged with Hall's academic project since the 1970s due to his appearance in the BBC programme It Ain’t Half Racist, Mum. Consequently, The Unfinished Conversation is a personal project for the director reflecting on his own passage and research on archive-based work related to the notion of black identity.

== The commission ==
Akomfrah's project The Unfinished Conversation started as an application to the Arts Council initiated by Mark Sealy, Director of Autograph ABP and executive producer of the project, based on the premise of commissioning a collaboration between Akomfrah and academic Stuart Hall about the notion of visual and black identity. However, the extensive availability of archive material featuring Hall on radio, cinema and television suggested a parallel project, the making of Akomfrah's documentary The Stuart Hall Project.

In an interview with writer-curator Georgia Korossi, Akomfrah explains: "I started to play around with the idea of seeing The Unfinished Conversation as our take on Hall's legacy and implications, and The Stuart Hall Project being pretty much his take on us, and the outside world."

The project was made possible by Autograph ABP's commission, with the aim to bring visibility to photographic histories and practices that have often been overlooked.

== The project ==
The acclaimed three-screen installation, The Unfinished Conversation, was developed through the study and selection from 800 hours of Stuart Hall's own archive material of audio interviews and television recordings. With reference to identity, race and memory, The Unfinished Conversation re-imagines the nature of memory itself through an individual's personal archive, marked with the music of Miles Davis, one of Hall's much loved musicians, as Hall's remarkable archive triggers the world events that were unfolding.

Akomfrah's multi-layered installation celebrates Hall's groundbreaking work on culture and identity that is still relevant today. It also examines the questionable nature of the visual that reflects on Hall's work in media studies; with reference to Hall's own position in the world, growing up in Jamaica as part of the Caribbean diaspora, it tackles his central idea that identity, ethnic, cultural or sexual, is fluid and open to recreation.
