= Black and British: A Forgotten History =

2016 BBC documentary television series

- Genre: Documentary
- Created by: David Olusoga
- Directed by: Naomi Austin
- Presented by: David Olusoga
- Composer: Segun Akinola
- Country of origin: United Kingdom
- No. of seasons: 1
- No. of episodes: 4

Original release
- Release: 9 November 2016

Black and British: A Forgotten History is a four-part BBC Television documentary series, written and presented by David Olusoga and first broadcast in November 2016, and a book of the same title written by Olusoga to accompany the series.

It documents the history of Black people in Britain and its colonies, starting with those who arrived as part of the Roman occupation, and relates that history to modern Black British identity.

As part of each programme, commemorative plaques – twenty in all – honouring the people discussed, were erected.

The series' music was composed by Segun Akinola, who in 2019 received a nomination at the Screen Nation Awards in the "Rising Star" category for his work on this and two other programmes.

The book was awarded the 2017 Hessell-Tiltman Prize. A new edition was published in 2021, with an additional chapter on the 2018 Windrush scandal and the 2020 Black Lives Matter protests.

== Episodes and plaques ==
Each episode had several main topics, and saw the erection of commemorative plaques, as listed in parentheses below, five of which were overseas.

=== 1: First Encounters ===
- Beachy Head Lady, purported to be the earliest Black Briton (plaque at a cricket pavilion in East Dean). The plaque was removed as DNA analysis determined the remains origins to have been from "southern Europe – most likely Cyprus"; improved methods confirmed in 2025 that her ancestry was from southern England. Olusoga said in 2024: "the research changed so it was edited out of the programme and edited out of the updated version of my book. When the science changes, history changes. That’s the scholarly approach. But Beachy Head Woman still became a culture wars battleground because a few people believe I have an agenda and see my work as a threat".
- Aballava, the first recorded African community in Britain (plaque at St Michael's Church, Burgh by Sands)
- John Blanke, musician of African descent (fl. 1501–1511)
- Francis Barber (at Dr Johnson's House, London; unveiled by his great-great-great-great-grandson, Cedric Barber)
- Elmina Castle, Ghana

=== 2: Freedom ===
- Black sailors at the Battle of Trafalgar (no plaque)
- Bunce Island Fortress, Sierra Leone
- Jonathan Strong and his defender, and anti-slavery campaigner, Granville Sharp (at St Bartholomew's Hospital, London)
- Bill Richmond, a slave freed during the American Revolution, subsequently a bare-knuckle boxer in England (at the Tom Cribb, a pub in London)
- The Cotton Tree in Freetown, Sierra Leone

=== 3: Moral Mission ===
- 150,000 Africans liberated by the West Africa Squadron (in King's Yard, Freetown)
- Sarah Forbes Bonetta (at Palm Cottage in Kent; unveiled by her great, great grandson)
- Uncle Tom's Cabin and black-face minstrelry (no plaque)
- Frederick Douglass (at Bell Street Baptist Chapel, Dundee, where he spoke on 30 January 1846)
- Millworkers of Rochdale, who supported the struggle against slavery despite the cotton famine caused by the American Civil War (alongside Cotton Famine Road; unveiled by the Mayor of Rochdale)
- More than 1,000 Jamaicans brutalised or killed following the Morant Bay rebellion (two identical plaques; one at Morant Bay and one at the Black Cultural Archives in London).

=== 4: The Homecoming ===
- Olusoga recalls his family being driven out of his childhood home by the National Front (no plaque)
- The visit of Kings Khama III, Sebele I and Bathoen I to England in 1895, leading to the foundation of Botswana (at the Botswanan Embassy in London)
- Charles Wotten, a victim of the 1919 Liverpool Race Riots (at Queen's Dock, Port of Liverpool)
- Cabaret singer Leslie Hutchinson (at the nightclub Quaglino's in London, where he regularly performed; unveiled by two of his children, Gabrielle and her half-brother Chris)
- Black GIs stationed at Pontypool, Wales, during World War II (bilingual plaque in English and Welsh, at Trinity Methodist Church, Abersychan; unveiled by Anne, a "Brown Baby" with a Black GI father)
- The HMT Empire Windrush generations.

== Reception ==
=== TV programme ===
In reviewing the series for The Guardian, Chitra Ramaswamy wrote:

Olusoga excavates our shared heritage with humanity and verve. One of his main messages is that remembrance is a political act. And in a present as tumultuous as ours, facing a future as uncertain as it gets, we need to look to the past more than ever. History never seemed so prescient.

Jasper Rees said in a four-starred review for The Daily Telegraph: "This is a likeable series. So why has it taken so long to be made?"

=== Book ===
Colin Grant wrote in The Guardian: "Olusoga's insightful 'forgotten history' amounts to much more than a text to accompany a TV series. Yet despite its many attributes, is it too temperate?"

Sadiah Qureshi in the London Review of Books called the book "remarkable".

David Dabydeen, writing in the New Statesman, said that the book "addresses one of the greatest silences in British historiography".

Aamna Mohdin interviewed Olusoga for The Guardian after the second edition of the book was published. Olusoga said that hostility towards his work had been growing "to the point where some of the statements being made are so easily refutable, so verifiably and unquestionably false, that you have to presume that the people writing them know that. And that must lead you to another assumption, which is that they know that this is not true, but they have decided that these national myths are so important to them and their political projects, or their sense of who they are, that they don't really care about the historical truths behind them.... They have been able to convince people that their own history, being explored by their own historians and being investigated by their own children and grandchildren, is a threat to them."
