= Joséphine Ndagnou =

Cameroonian film director and television actress

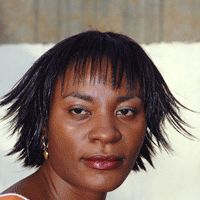
- Ndagnou in 2007
- Born: 1964 (age 61–62)
- Occupation: Actress

Joséphine Ndagnou (born 1964) is a Cameroonian film director and television actress.

== Life ==
Ndagou worked as a director for Cameroon Radio Television for 15 years. She acted in several telefilms, including Japhet and Ginette and L’étoile de Noudi [The Star of Noudi], which made her famous under the pseudonym Ta Zibi. In 2007 she wrote, directed, produced and starred in a feature film, Paris Or Nothing, which portrayed a young refugee forced into prostitution and struggling to survive in Europe.

== Filmography ==
As director

- Paris a Tout Prix [Paris Or Nothing]. Feature film, 2007.

As actor

- The last trip, dir. Jean-Marie Téno. Short film, 1990.
- Les Saignantes [Those who bleed], dir. Jean-Pierre Bekolo. Feature film, 2005.
