= Yvonne Weekes =

British-born Montserratian writer and theater director

Yvonne Weekes is a British-born Montserratian writer, theater director, and educator. She was Montserrat's first director of culture before being forced to move to Barbados during the eruption of the Soufrière Hills volcano in the 1990s. Her work deals with issues of displacement and isolation due to environmental and cultural forces beyond our control.

== Early life and education ==
Weekes was born in London, England, to parents from Montserrat. She grew up between the two countries, moving back to Montserrat in 1967. In 1973, she returned to the U.K. She attended university there, graduating with a degree in drama and English from Middlesex University in 1980.

== Career ==
After college, Weekes became a drama and English teacher in England. She also began working in theater and filmmaking, including with the Black Audio Film Collective on its project Handsworth Songs.

She returned to Montserrat in 1987, where she taught English and founded the Rainbow Theatre Company, a troupe that traveled around the Caribbean. She produced and directed several plays with the company before its dissolution. Weekes was also appointed as the country's first director of culture.

In 1995, Montserrat's central Soufrière Hills volcano began to erupt, setting off a period of activity that would continue for several years. As ash fell across the island, Weekes, who lived in the village of Cork Hill at the time, held out for as long as she could. In 1996, she fled to Barbados with her son, Nathan.

In Barbados, Weekes began studying at the University of the West Indies at Cave Hill, where she eventually obtained a Ph.D. in 2016. She taught drama and worked as the theater arts coordinator at Barbados Community College, then became a lecturer at the Errol Barrow Centre for Creative Imagination at the University of the West Indies.

Weekes has advised and helped develop the theater arts syllabus for the Caribbean Examinations Council.

=== Writing ===
A writer of plays, prose, and poetry, Weekes was first published in Charting the Journey, an anthology of black women writers, in 1988.

In 2004, she released Madness, a CD of spoken-word poetry.

After starting out as a personal project, Weekes' memoir Volcano was published in 2006 by Peepal Tree Press. It recounts the central role the Soufrière Hills volcano plays in the lives of Montserrat residents, and documents her experience during the eruption in the 1990s. It won her the Frank Collymore Literary Arts Endowment Award.

In 2010, her play Blue Soap was published in an anthology of Caribbean female playwrights called Emancipation Moments.

Weekes' first book of poems, Nomad, was published by House of Nehesi Publishers in 2019. The poetry collection of "stubborn grit," according to Montserratian writer George Irish, has also been called "a survivors' handbook" by Jamaican performance artist A-dZiko Simba Gegele. The verses in the collection deal with displacement throughout her life as she shifted between England, Barbados, and Montserrat, which she describes as the place she feels most at home.

== Selected works ==
- Volcano (2006)
- Blue Soap in Emancipation Moments (2010)
- Nomad (House of Nehesi Publishers, 2019)
- Disaster Matters: Disasters Matter, Editors Yvonne Weekes, Wendy McMahon (House of Nehesi Publishers, 2021)
- Voices: Monologues & Dramatic Text for Caribbean Actors, Editor (House of Nehesi Publishers, 2022)
