= British Film Institute =

British film archive and charity

- Abbreviation: BFI
- Predecessor: UK Film Council
- Formation: 1933; 93 years ago
- Type: Film, television charitable organisation
- Headquarters: 21 Stephen Street, London, United Kingdom W1T 1LN
- Region served: United Kingdom
- Chair: Jay Hunt
- Chief Executive: Ben Roberts
- Revenue: £127,827,000 (2022–23)
- Website: bfi.org.uk

The British Film Institute (BFI) is a film and television charitable organisation which promotes and preserves independent and mainstream filmmaking and television in the United Kingdom. The BFI uses funds provided by the National Lottery to encourage film production, distribution, and education. It is sponsored by the Department for Culture, Media and Sport, and partially funded under the British Film Institute Act 1949.

== Activities ==
=== Purpose ===
The BFI was established in 1933 to encourage the development of the arts of film, television and the moving image throughout the UK to promote their use as a record of contemporary life and manners, to promote education about film, television and the moving image generally, and their impact on society, to promote access to and appreciation of the widest possible range of British and world cinema and to establish, care for and develop collections reflecting the moving image history, heritage and culture of the United Kingdom.

=== Archive ===
The BFI maintains the world's largest film archive, the BFI National Archive, previously called National Film Library (1935–1955), National Film Archive (1955–1992), and National Film and Television Archive (1993–2006). The archive contains more than 50,000 fiction films, over 100,000 non-fiction titles, and around 625,000 television programmes. The majority of the collection is British material but it also features internationally significant holdings from around the world. The archive also holds documents which feature key actors and the work of film makers.

=== Online video collection ===
In 2024, the BFI National Archive launched Our Screen Heritage, a National Lottery–funded programme to collect and preserve online moving image works, including memes, video blogs, web series, and viral videos. The project reached its target of 400 acquisitions in December 2025, with roughly 60 works made available to the public through the BFI's Replay platform, accessible via UK public libraries. The collection spans early internet works such as a 1991 University of Cambridge webcam feed regarded as one of the first livestreams and the interactive web drama Online Caroline, through to viral videos including "Charlie Bit My Finger" and Mr Weebl's "Badgers" animation, and later online-video genres such as ASMR, video essays, and how-to tutorials.

BFI curators, including Digital Curatorial Archivist Will Swinburne, have said selections prioritise works representative of distinct online video cultures over view counts alone, and that acquisition requires each creator's consent and an original file. The BFI partnered with The Creative Nonfiction Film Weekend on "Chronically Online: A Personal History of the UK Internet," screening selections from the collection in UK cinemas.

=== Cinemas ===
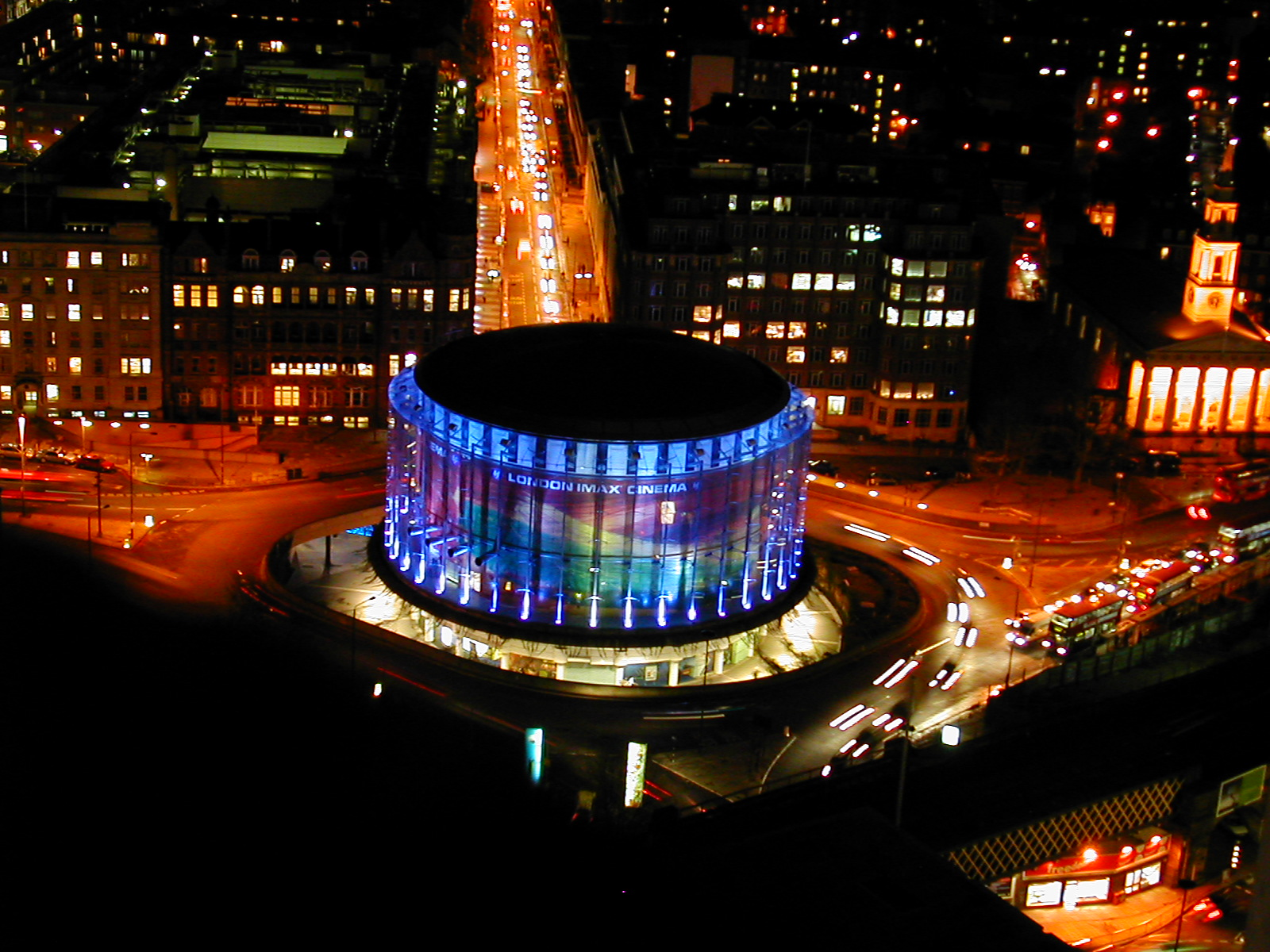
BFI IMAX cinema

The BFI runs the BFI Southbank (formerly the National Film Theatre (NFT)) and the BFI IMAX cinema, both located on the south bank of the River Thames in London. The IMAX has the largest cinema screen in the UK and shows popular recent releases and short films showcasing its technology, which includes IMAX 70mm screenings, IMAX 3D screenings and 11,600 watts of digital surround sound. BFI Southbank shows films from all over the world, particularly critically acclaimed historical and specialised films that may not otherwise get a cinema showing. The BFI also distributes archival and cultural cinema to other venues – each year to more than 800 venues all across the UK, as well as to a substantial number of overseas venues.

=== Education ===
The BFI offers a range of education initiatives, in particular to support the teaching of film and media studies in schools. In late 2012, the BFI received money from the Department for Education to create the BFI Film Academy Network for young people aged between 16 and 25. A residential scheme is held at the National Film and Television School (NFTS) every year.

=== Festivals ===
The BFI runs the annual London Film Festival along with BFI Flare: London LGBTIQ+ Film Festival and the youth-orientated Future Film Festival.

=== Screenonline ===
Between 2003 and 2026 the BFI maintained the website Screenonline, an online archive covering the history of British film, television, and social history as documented by film and television. The project was funded by a £1.2 million grant from the National Lottery New Opportunities Fund. Articles featured on the site were usually of significant film or television topics, including production companies, films and television programmes. The site also offered downloads of clips or full episodes of television programmes, which were only viewable in registered libraries and educational institutions. The site was taken permanently offline and archived at the UK Government Web Archive in October 2026.

=== Other activities ===
See also Category:British Film Institute films

The BFI publishes the monthly magazine Sight & Sound, as well as films on Blu-ray, DVD and books. It runs the BFI Reuben Library (a free reference library open to the public at BFI Southbank), and maintains the BFI Film & TV Database and Summary of Information on Film and Television (SIFT), which are databases of credits, synopses and other information about film and television productions. SIFT has a collection of about 7 million still frames from film and television. The BFI has co-produced a number of television series featuring footage from the BFI National Archive, in partnership with the BBC, including The Lost World of Mitchell & Kenyon, The Lost World of Friese-Greene and The Lost World of Tibet.

The BFI has also produced contemporary artists' moving image work, most notably through the programme of the BFI Gallery, which was located at BFI Southbank from March 2007 to March 2011. The programme of the gallery resulted in several new commissions by leading artists, including projects which engaged directly with the BFI National Archive, among which are Patrick Keiller's 'The City of the Future', Iain Forsyth and Jane Pollard's 'RadioMania: An Abandoned Work' and Deimantas Narkevicious' 'Into the Unknown'. The Gallery also initiated projects by filmmakers such as Michael Snow, Apichatpong Weerasethakul, Jane and Louise Wilson and John Akomfrah.

The BFI also operates a streaming service, BFI Player. This streaming service offers a variety of niche and art films.

== Organisation ==
=== History ===
National Film Theatre

The institute was founded in 1933. Despite its foundation resulting from a recommendation in a report on Film in National Life, at that time the institute was a private company, though it has received public money throughout its history. This came from the Privy Council and Treasury until 1965, and from the various culture departments since then.

The institute was restructured following the Radcliffe Report of 1948, which recommended that it should concentrate on developing the appreciation of filmic art, rather than creating film itself. Thus control of educational film production passed to the National Committee for Visual Aids in Education and the British Film Academy assumed control for promoting production.

The British Film Institute Act 1949 was passed by the Parliament of the United Kingdom to enable the HM Teasury to give the BFI grants from funds approved by Parliament. From 1952 to 2000, the BFI provided funding for new and experimental film-makers via the BFI Production Board.

The institute received a royal charter in 1983. This was updated in 2000, and in the same year the newly established UK Film Council took responsibility for providing the BFI's annual grant-in-aid (government subsidy). As an independent registered charity, the BFI is regulated by the Charity Commission and the Privy Council.

In 1988, the BFI opened the London Museum of the Moving Image (MOMI) on the South Bank. MOMI was acclaimed internationally and set new standards for education through entertainment, but it did not receive the high levels of continuing investment that might have enabled it to keep pace with technological developments and ever-rising audience expectations. The museum was "temporarily" closed in 1999 when the BFI stated that it would be re-sited. This did not happen, and MOMI's closure became permanent in 2002 when it was decided to redevelop the South Bank site. This redevelopment was itself then further delayed.

=== Today ===
The BFI is managed on a day-to-day basis by its chief executive, Ben Roberts. Supreme decision-making authority rests with a chair and a board of up to 15 governors. The current chair is Jay Hunt, a television executive, who took up the post in February 2024. Governors, including the Chair, are appointed by the Secretary of State for Culture, Media and Sport.

The BFI operates with three sources of income. The largest is public money allocated by the Department for Culture, Media and Sport. For the year 2021–22, the BFI received £74.31m from the DCMS as Grant-in-Aid funding. The second largest source is commercial activity such as receipts from ticket sales at BFI Southbank or the BFI London IMAX theatre (£5m in 2007), sales of DVDs, etc. Thirdly, grants and sponsorship of around £5m are obtained from various sources, including National Lottery funding grants, private sponsors and through donations (J. Paul Getty, Jr., who died in 2003, left the BFI a legacy of around £1m in his will). The BFI is also the distributor for all Lottery funds for film (in 2011–12 this amounted to c.£25m).

As well as its work on film, the BFI also devotes a large amount of its time to the preservation and study of British television programming and its history. In 2000, it published a high-profile list of the 100 Greatest British Television Programmes, as voted for by a range of industry figures.

The delayed redevelopment of the National Film Theatre took place in 2007, creating in the rebranded "BFI Southbank" new education spaces, a contemporary art gallery dedicated to the moving image (the BFI Gallery), and a mediatheque which enabled the public to gain access, free of charge, to some of the otherwise inaccessible material in the National Film & Television Archive. The mediatheque has proved to be a popular element of this redevelopment, and there are plans to roll out a network of them across the UK.

An announcement of a £25 million capital investment in the Strategy for UK Screen Heritage was made by Secretary of State for Culture, Media and Sport at the opening night of the 2007 London Film Festival. The bulk of this money paid for long overdue development of the BFI National Archive facilities in Hertfordshire and Warwickshire.

During 2009, the UK Film Council persuaded the government that there should only be one main public-funded body for film, and that body should be the UKFC, while the BFI should be abolished. In 2010, the government announced that there would be a single body for film. Despite intensive lobbying (including, controversially, using public funding to pay public relations agencies to put its case forward), the UKFC failed to persuade the government that it should have that role and, instead, the BFI took over most of the UKFC's functions and funding from 1 April 2011, with the UKFC being subsequently abolished. Since then, the BFI has been responsible for all Lottery funding for film—originally in excess of £25m p.a., and currently in excess of £40m p.a.

The BFI Film Academy forms part of the BFI's overall 5–19 Education Scheme. The programme is being supported by the Department for Education in England who have committed £1m per annum funding from April 2012 and 31 March 2015. It is also funded through the National Lottery, Creative Scotland and Northern Ireland Screen.

On 29 November 2016, the BFI announced that over 100,000 television programmes are to be digitised before the video tapes, which currently have an estimated five-to-six-year shelf life, become unusable. The BFI aims to make sure that the television archive is still there in 200 years' time.

In February 2021, the BFI announced that it was teaming up with American diversity and inclusion program #StartWith8Hollywood founded by Cheryl L. Bedford, Manon de Reeper and Thuc Doan Nguyen to make it global.

== Leadership ==
The BFI is currently chaired by Jay Hunt and run by CEO Ben Roberts and deputy CEO Harriet Finney.

=== BFI Chair ===
- George Sutherland-Leveson-Gower, 5th Duke of Sutherland (1933–1936)
- Sir Charles Cleland (1936–1937)
- Sir George Clerk (1938–1939)
- William Brass, 1st Baron Chattisham (1939–1945)
- Patrick Gordon Walker (1946–1948)
- Cecil Harmsworth King (1948–1952)
- S. C. Roberts (1952–1956)
- Sylvester Gates (1956–1964)
- Sir William Coldstream (1964–1971)
- Sir Denis Forman (1971–1973)
- Lord Lloyd of Hampstead (1973–1976)
- John Freeman (1976–1977)
- Enid Wistrich (Acting) (1977–1978)
- Sir Basil Engholm (1978–1981)
- Lord Attenborough (1981–1992)
- Jeremy Thomas (1992–1997)
- Sir Alan Parker (1997–1999)
- Joan Bakewell (1999–2002)
- Anthony Minghella (2002–2007)
- Roger Laughton (Acting) (2008)
- Greg Dyke (2007–2016)
- Josh Berger (2016–2021)
- Tim Richards (2021–2024)
- Jay Hunt (2024–)

=== BFI directors ===
- J. W. Brown (1933–1936)
- Oliver Bell (1936–1949)
- Denis Forman (1949–1955)
- James Quinn (1955–1964)
- Stanley Reed (1964–1972)
- Keith Lucas (1972–1978)
- Anthony Smith (1978–1987)
- Wilf Stevenson (1987–1997)
- Jane Clarke (acting, 1997)
- John Woodward (1997–1999)
- Jon Teckman (1999–2002)
- Adrian Wootton (acting, 2002–2003)
- Amanda Nevill (2003–2020)
- Ben Roberts (2020–present)

== See also ==
- BFI 75 Most Wanted – the most sought-after films currently missing from the BFI archive
- BFI Flipside – the DVD/Blu-ray collection dedicated to telling the alternative history of British film
- BFI Top 100 British films
- BFI TV 100 – a list of the best British television programmes
- Fellows of the British Film Institute
- Cinema of the United Kingdom
- Independent cinema in the United Kingdom
- London in film
- Television in the United Kingdom
- List of film institutes
- Association of European Film Archives and Cinematheques
- Sutherland Trophy – annual BFI Award for "the maker of the most original and imaginative film introduced at the National Film Theatre during the year"
