= British Film Institute Act 1949 =

Act of the Parliament of the United Kingdom

British Film Institute Act 1949 (Note: Section 2.)
- Act of Parliament
- Parliament of the United Kingdom
- Long title: An Act to provide for the payment to the British Film Institute of grants out of moneys provided by Parliament.
- Citation: 12, 13 & 14 Geo. 6. c. 35
- Introduced by: Glenvil Hall (Commons); Lord Pakenham (Lords)
- Territorial extent: United Kingdom

Dates
- Royal assent: 31 May 1949
- Commencement: 31 May 1949 (Note: The Acts of Parliament (Commencement) Act 1793.)
Other legislation
Amended by	Sunday Cinema Act 1972

Status: Partially repealed

Text of statute as originally enacted

Revised text of statute as amended

Text of the British Film Institute Act 1949 as in force today (including any amendments) within the United Kingdom, from legislation.gov.uk.

The British Film Institute Act 1949 (12, 13 & 14 Geo. 6. c. 35) is an act of the Parliament of the United Kingdom. It allows the government to fund the British Film Institute.

== Passage ==
The act had its second reading in the House of Commons on 6 May 1949. It was passed to the House of Lords on 16 May, and had its second reading there on 25 May. The act was given royal assent on 31 May 1949.

== Provisions ==
The act has only one operative section which allowed the Treasury to make grants to the British Film Institute out of Parliament-approved funds. This was in addition to any grants from the Cinematograph Fund established under the Sunday Entertainments Act 1932.

== Subsequent developments ==
The act was amended by the Sunday Cinema Act 1972 to remove the reference to the Cinematograph Fund, as it was being wound up.
