= Purple (video installation) =

Video installation by John Akomfrah

- Purple in 2022 at the Hirshhorn Museum and Sculpture Garden
- Artist: John Akomfrah
- Year: 2017
- Medium: Six-channel video, color, sound
- Dimensions: 180 cm × 370 cm (72 in × 144 in); Variable
- Location: Hirshhorn Museum and Sculpture Garden, Smithsonian Institution, Washington, D.C.; and Institute of Contemporary Art, Boston
- Accession: 2021.013 (Hirshhorn); 2020.04 (ICA Boston)

Purple is a 62-minute immersive six-channel video installation created by the British artist and filmmaker John Akomfrah in 2017. It draws from hundreds of hours of archival footage and combines with newly shot film, spoken word, and original music to explore climate change and its effects on human communities, biodiversity and the wilderness. It is divided into five movements and includes locations such as Alaska, Greenland, New York, Mumbai, rural Scotland, Tahiti and the Marquesas Islands in the South Pacific.

It was commissioned by the Barbican, London and co-commissioned by Bildmuseet, Sweden; TBA21-Academy; Institute of Contemporary Art, Boston; Berardo Collection Museum, Lisbon; and Garage Museum of Contemporary Art, Moscow. It premiered at the Curve, Barbican in October 2017 where it exhibited for nine weeks.

Purple was jointly acquired by the Hirshhorn Museum and Sculpture Garden, Washington, D.C., and the Institute of Contemporary Art, Boston, in 2021.

== Exhibition history ==
- Curve, Barbican, London, October 2017 - January 2018
- Thyssen-Bornemisza Museum, Madrid, February 2018 - March 2018
- Bildmuseet, Umeå, Sweden, April 2019 - September 2018
- Berardo Collection Museum, Lisbon, November 2018 to March 2019
- Institute of Contemporary Art, Boston, May 2019 - September 2019
- Garage Museum of Contemporary Art, Moscow, June 2019 - November 2019
- Palais de Tokyo, Paris February 2020 - May 2020
- Museum Kurhaus, Kleve, Germany, March 2020 - July 2020
- Bass Museum, Miami, May 2020 - August 2020
- Hirshhorn Museum and Sculpture Garden, Smithsonian Institution, Washington, D.C., November 2022 - January 2024

== Soundtrack ==
The installation's original score was composed by Tandis Jenhudson and David Julyan.

== Reception ==
The Telegraph gave the film 4 out of 5 stars, stating that "Akomfrah drives home his concerns with compelling clarity, sparking off chains of association that are grimly disturbing while offering a reminder of all the beauty that we stand to lose".

The Guardian commented that "Akomfrah's overwhelming film evokes that very dilemma: our apparent helplessness as individuals in the face of rising sea levels and temperatures, droughts, and melting icecaps. Against a stirring contemporary classical soundtrack, his film begins by summoning up the momentum of industrial England, a world of mass production that signals - but is utterly unlike - the hyper-reality of contemporary globalism and digital interconnectivity".

Time Out gave the film 3 out of 5 stars, stating "it can be frustrating being preached to when you’re in the choir, especially when Akomfrah isn’t offering any solutions or new comments. He’s just presenting all these horrifying visions of humanity’s impact on the planet. But maybe that’s the point. Maybe Akomfrah is just overwhelmed, helpless and shocked in the face of our idiocy, standing slack-jawed under the Anthropocene’s wave of effluent. Maybe this is the only way he can start to make sense of it all."

City A.M. described it as a "wildly ambitious project is undertaken by documentary-maker and artist John Akomfrah, whose resulting video montage is at once mesmerizing, meditative and melancholy, a wild and sometimes overwhelming voyage through our lives on both a micro and macro scale." It went on to state that "It’s a wonderful piece of work, both uplifting and haunting, and a reminder that we all need to be better."
