= The Bloodettes =

- Promotional poster
- French: Les Saignantes
- Directed by: Jean-Pierre Bekolo
- Written by: Jean-Pierre Bekolo
- Produced by: Jean-Pierre Bekolo; Andre Bennett; Lisa Crosato; Jim Fink; Michelle Gue; Pascale Obolo; Adrienne Silvey
- Starring: Dorylia Calmel; Adèle Ado
- Cinematography: Robert Humphreys
- Edited by: Jean-Pierre Bekolo
- Music by: Joelle Esso; Adam Zanders
- Release date: 2005
- Running time: 92 minutes
- Countries: France; Cameroon
- Language: French

The Bloodettes (French: Les Saignantes) is a 2005 futuristic science fiction erotic thriller film. Set in the year 2025, the film follows two young women, Majolie and Chouchou, as they attempt to dispose of the corpse of a political leader who dies during sexual intercourse with Majolie. The film also addresses political corruption in Cameroon through its plot and use of intertitles. The film won the Silver Stallion (second best African film) at Fespaco 2007 and the Best Actress awards with the special mention of the jury.

== Cast ==
- Adèle Ado as Majolie
- Dorylia Calmel as Chouchou
- Emile Abossolo M'Bo as Minister of State
- Josephine Ndagnou as Natou
- Essindi Mindja as Essomba
- Alain Dzukam as Rokko
- Veronique Mendouga as Dr. Amanga
- Bekate Meyong as Mamba
- Thierry Mintamack as Tony

== Awards ==
- Adèle Ado won Best Actress for her work in Les Saignantes at the 2007 Ouagadougou Panafrican Film and Television Festival.
- Jean-Pierre Bekolo won the "Silver Etalon de Yennega" for his work on the film at the 2007 Ouagadougou Panafrican Film and Television Festival.

== See also ==
- List of Afrofuturist films
