= The March (2013 film) =

- Directed by: John Akomfrah
- Narrated by: Denzel Washington
- Composer: Tandis Jenhudson
- Countries of origin: United Kingdom; United States
- Original language: English

Production
- Executive producers: Robert Redford; Laura Michalchyshyn; Krysanne Katsoolis
- Producers: David Lawson; Lina Gopaul; Gina Belafonte
- Cinematography: Dewald Aukema
- Editor: Cliff West
- Production companies: Smoking Dogs Films; Sundance Productions; Wildwood Enterprises, Inc; Cactus Three

Original release
- Network: PBS
- Release: 27 August 2013
- Network: BBC Two
- Release: 28 August 2013

The March (titled Martin Luther King and the March on Washington in the United Kingdom) is a documentary film directed by John Akomfrah and narrated by Denzel Washington. It is about the historic 1963 March on Washington for Jobs and Freedom - largely remembered for Martin Luther King's famous and iconic "I Have a Dream" speech delivered on the steps of the Lincoln Memorial in Washington, D.C. It formed the centrepiece of a special week of programs and online events and activities celebrating the 50th anniversary of the March.

The film features interviews with some of the key people involved in the event: members of the inner circles of the core organizational groups such as Jack O'Dell, Clarence B. Jones, John Lewis, Julian Bond, Norman Hill, A. Philip Randolph and Andrew Young; Hollywood supporters and Civil Rights Movement campaigners including Harry Belafonte, Diahann Carroll and Sidney Poitier; performing artists at the March such as Joan Baez and Peter Yarrow; as well as John F. Kennedy administration official Harris Wofford; the CBS broadcaster who reported from the March, Roger Mudd; Clayborne Carson, the founding director of Stanford's Martin Luther King Jr. Research and Education Institute and a participant in the March; as well as those who witnessed the march on TV and were influenced by it, including Oprah Winfrey.

== Broadcast ==
The film had its U.S. premiere on 23 August 2013 on PBS and its UK premiere on BBC Two on 28 August 2013, the 50th anniversary of the original event. It was broadcast in France on 11 October 2013 on France 3.

== Reception ==
On Metacritic, the film has an average score of 86 out of 100, based on six reviews, indicating "universal acclaim".

In the U.S. the San Francisco Chronicle wrote that "The March is not only a timely film document, it is also properly structured as the great drama the event was". The New York Times described it as "a succinct and well-conceived documentary". Robert Bianco of USA TODAY wrote, "Should be mandatory viewing."

In the U.K. The Observer gave the film high praise, reporting that it was "so good that it ought to be on the national curriculum" and calling it "quite possibly the best thing the BBC has created in years.". The Independent called it a "supremely authoritative documentary" while The Guardian stated that "the success of this documentary lay in its range of different voices."

The UK broadcast was nominated for a BAFTA at the 2014 British Academy Television Awards in the specialist factual category, losing to eventual winner "David Attenborough's Natural History Museum Alive".

== See also ==
- Civil rights movement in popular culture
- The March, a 1964 documentary film about the 1963 March on Washington
