= The Stuart Hall Project =

- Film poster
- Directed by: John Akomfrah
- Written by: John Akomfrah
- Produced by: Smoking Dogs Films; Lina Gopaul
- Cinematography: Dewald Aukema
- Edited by: Nse Asuquo
- Release date: 13 June 2013 (Sheffield)
- Running time: 96 minutes
- Country: United Kingdom
- Language: English

The Stuart Hall Project is a 2013 British film written and directed by John Akomfrah centred on cultural theorist Stuart Hall, who is regarded as one of the founding figures of the New Left and a key architect of Cultural Studies in Britain. The film uses a montage of documentary footage together with Hall's own words and thoughts to produce what Peter Bradshaw of The Guardian called "an absorbing account", awarding it four stars and stating that it has "an idealism and high seriousness that people might not immediately associate with the subject Hall pioneered". Sight & Sound magazine's Ashley Clark described it as "a strongly personal work" that "unfolds simultaneously as a tribute to a heroic figure, a study of the emergence of the New Left and its attendant political ideas, and a summation, in thematic and technical terms, of the key characteristics of Akomfrah’s body of work thus far (intertextuality, archival manipulation, a focus on postcolonial and diasporic discourse in Britain)."

== Summary ==
The Stuart Hall Project, together with Akomfrah's three-screen video installation The Unfinished Conversation, tells the story of cultural theorist Stuart Hall narrated through Hall's archived audio interviews and television recordings. Akomfrah explores the myriad ways that Hall influenced black British constructions of identity in the second half of the 20th century. Hall appeared on the British radio and television for more than 50 years and spent his whole career exploring how social change makes sense of who we are, what we are entitled to and what society makes available to us.

Hall continually engages the hybridity and complexity of identity and its relationship to sociopolitical and sociocultural phenomena. He comments that, similar to Miles Davis’s trumpet, it is the seemingly most mundane portions of everyday life that can affect the person we become and more broadly provide an accurate barometer of social change. Society is infinitely changing, and must be closely analyzed in order to pinpoint exactly what catalyses such change, as the cause can be the most subtle. "Where do you come from?" is expected to be followed up with a long story.

The immigrants of the Caribbean opened up the ideas that the notions of ourselves and our values of where we live are not always translatable from one value to another. Hall says the theory that full assimilation is possible, or that the people who came over two generations would disappear into the host family and become more or less indistinguishable from them, was a dream or illusion to be buried on both sides. Youth began to answer the question "Who am I?" with: "I am the person who is refusing that identity."

Young blacks of the 1970s, who were being alienated from identifying as British, emerged from this deep crisis of identity by coming to the realization that the complex things that made them black could never be traded away. Instead of being complacent about confronting racism, according to Hall black youth came to understand that in order to truly contest a problem it is imperative that you mobilize. It is in that moment that the archaic ideals of "perfect assimilation" in Britain die and the multi-cultural society comes to life: "we are not going to stay on the terms of becoming just like you."

== Style ==
In an interview, director Akomfrah discusses his thought process and intention in documenting Hall's life. The film presents available archives, while playing a Miles Davis soundtrack with purpose. The interplay of music, visual archive, and the ongoing narrative of Hall theorising black British identity construction is a cinematographic ongoing theme. Akomfrah uses the interplay to elucidate Hall's critical theorisation that everyday lived experiences (examples given included waiting in line at the labour department, on public buses, etc.) of interracial interaction aggregate to create social change. As multicultural subjectivities become increasingly prevalent in what were culturally white British spaces, this phenomenon becomes all the more complicated. This exchange between identity and creation of a multicultural social reality is evident in the video clip of Hall debating the white woman about refugees from Kosovo and whether the UK should serve as a new space for them.

Akomfrah assembled the transnational pieces of those stories by showing minimally contextualised photo and video historical archives of global historical events, everyday goings on, and from Hall's own life. While the images themselves seem tangential at times they become contextualised when placed with the musical score and Hall's critical narrative. One example of this is when Hall is explaining the racially biased media rhetoric surrounding reports of a "mugging epidemic" in Britain. This narrative is paired with ominous light piano music, and a beautiful wedding portrait of a late 19th-/early 20th-century black British couple. The pairing of the lovely image and the contemporaneous racist dialogue shows the interaction between everyday lived experience and the construction of social phenomena. In this way, Akomfrah's depiction of people's everyday lived-experiences works seamlessly in conjunction with Hall's theorisation of how such everyday experiences create large-scale social movement.

== The importance of Miles Davis ==
With the help of sound designers Trevor Mathison and Robin Fellows, Akomfrah's The Stuart Hall Project is an example of improvisation between the narrative device and jazz music, in this instance the music of Miles Davis. Akomfrah explains: "The Miles Davis music provided you with a kind of marker of time, which is much more explicit I felt than The Unfinished Conversation. Miles was there because I thought it gave you a kind of sonic map of a devolving postwar world, but it crucially also gave you the dates, which subliminally told you the content in which the music, as well as the images and Hall’s voice, were unfolding."

Furthermore, Miles Davis’ music played a huge influence on the Stuart Hall Project’s tone and overall arching themes. The Stuart Hall Project ties in the music of Miles Davis along with the overarching themes of identity formation, roots, nation-state and how one’s birth ties in with one’s location. Miles Davis’ music provides the opportunity for the audience viewer to experience a journey of transformation through his trumpet and music. The sounds of the trumpets coincided well with Hall's thoughts on identity formation and hybridity. Pointing out the history of Jazz music is important because the roots of Jazz are tied deeply within the African-American experience. Jazz music is created with the intention of having instruments played together in harmony, but also having the opportunity for the instruments and music to go way off the tracks into improv. This is similar to Stuart Hall's thoughts about identity formation in that sometimes one's identity is harmonious and clearly understood. While other times, one individual may not exactly understand one's identity and “go way off the tracks”. The use of Miles Davis’ music is important because it highlights the ways in how music plays a huge role in informing identity, reflecting on one's real life, and lived experiences.

== Hybridity ==
The Stuart Hall Project demonstrates the failures of "origin" and static identity. Hall says that he has not one origin "but five", and that "Jamaica is his birthplace, and Britain is his home, but he would never consider himself British." Race, and specifically blackness, is used as a lens to probe the ways that skin color informs how birthplace conflates with one's sense of home, and how that conflates with belonging. This is first seen among Hall's own family, when he expresses multiple times that he did not feel a part because of his skin complexion. They also forbade his sister from marrying a black man, and their attitudes and rejections of all things black created a break in Hall's identity politics. He realized that the path he was forging for himself was not and could not be consistent with his family's because of his skin, and that Jamaica though integral to his process of learning and growing was very far from somewhere he could categorize as home. The interactions he had with people from the West Indies, from Africa, from the Caribbean, from East India, and other parts of the world (all while in Britain) opened his eyes to the complexities of identity such that he understood the co-construction of identity between oneself and the politics occurring around one. There is no one origin, and individuals do not exist within themselves; people are all "something else" despite the continuous effort to situate ourselves within a specific place and time.
