= The Last Angel of History =

1996 documentary film by John Akomfrah

- Directed by: John Akomfrah
- Written by: Edward George
- Release date: 1996
- Language: English

The Last Angel of History is a 45-minute documentary, directed in 1996 by John Akomfrah and written and researched by Edward George of the Black Audio Film Collective, that deals with concepts of Afrofuturism as a metaphor for the displacement of black culture and roots. The film is a hybrid documentary and fictional narrative. Documentary segments include traditional talking-head clips from musicians, writers, and social critics, as well as archival video footage and photographs. Described as "A truly masterful film essay about Black aesthetics that traces the deployments of science fiction within pan-African culture", it has also been called "one of the most influential video-essays of the 1990s, influencing filmmakers and inspiring conferences, novels and exhibitions".

The fictional story follows the journey of the "Data Thief," played by the film's writer and researcher Edward George, who must travel across time and space in search of a crossroads where he makes archaeological digs for fragments of history and technology in search of the code that holds the key to his future. The structure of the film makes it a meta-narrative commenting on while also becoming part of the genre of Afrofuturism. The film uses concepts based on George Clinton's Mothership Connection and features interviews with Clinton, Derrick May, Samuel R. Delany, Octavia E. Butler, Nichelle Nichols, Juan Atkins, DJ Spooky, Goldie, Ishmael Reed, Greg Tate, Bernard Harris, Kodwo Eshun, Carl Craig, and A Guy Called Gerald to explore the link between black music as a way of exploring the future. The film makes mention of Sun Ra, whose work centres on the return of blacks to outer space in his own Mothership.

The Last Angel of History emphasizes black musical traditions. The film argues that the drum, which could "communicate both across the African diaspora and across time," was the "first Afrofuturistic technology." In "Further Considerations on Afrofuturism," Eshun says of the film: "The Last Angel of History remains the most elaborate exposition on the convergence of ideas that is Afrofuturism. Through the persona of a time-traveling nomadic figure known as the Data Thief, The Last Angel of History created a network of links between music, space, futurology, and diaspora." The film forges links between, for example, spirituals, P-Funk, and techno.

== See also ==
- List of Afrofuturist films
