= BFI Gallery =

Former gallery in London, England

Coordinates: 51.5072°N 0.1157°W

The BFI Gallery was the British Film Institute's contemporary art gallery dedicated to artists' moving image housed within BFI Southbank, the BFI's flagship venue in London, previously known as the National Film Theatre.

The space was funded by the BFI with Arts Council England support and opened on 14 March 2007, to coincide with the reopening of the site. Its programme of new commissions, events and associated artists' film screenings was curated by Elisabetta Fabrizi, BFI Head of Exhibitions. The programme included exhibitions by Michael Snow, John Akomfrah, Apichatpong Weerasethakul, Pierre Bismuth, Jane & Louise Wilson, Peter Campus, Patrick Keiller, Phil Collins, Matt Collishaw, Yvonne Rainer, Julian Rosensfeld, Michel Gondry, Deimantas Narkevicious, Mark Lewis. Film programmes linked to the gallery exhibitions included a retrospective of the films of Sergei Paradjanov and of Michael Snow.

As stated in the BFI Annual Review 2010-11:

The BFI Gallery has a deserved international reputation at the forefront of commissioning and exhibiting innovative and exciting artists working with the moving image. Since opening its doors in 2007 audiences have enthusiastically taken up rare opportunities to experience the work of worldclass artists such as Pierre Bismuth and Michel Gondry, Mat Collishaw, Apichatpong Weerasethakul and Jane and Louise Wilson. Major new exhibitions and retrospectives from a diverse and gifted range of artists took place, John Akomfrah, Julian Rosefeldt, Yvonne Rainer and Phil Collins. June 2010 opened with 'Mnemosyne', a pioneering film by John Akomfrah that movingly explores themes of memory and migration in the West Midlands, weaving archival footage from 1960 to 1981 with contemporary portraits of Birmingham. The film is an innovative mix of documentary and poetic essay and was described by Ken Russell, and experienced by visitors, as ‘mind blowing’. Julian Rosefeldt’s 'American Night'; a complex, five-channel film installation by the Berlin-based artist that confirmed his reputation for lavishly produced work in the moving image. 'American Night' borrowed from the style and rich image library of the American Western to subtly question the ambitions of recent US foreign policy. Next in residency was yet another star of the American art scene, Yvonne Rainer with the first major European retrospective dedicated to this legendary American dancer, choreographer and filmmaker. Very much a major influence on the new generation of video makers and choreographers, Rainer's work examines the balance between the political and the private in everyday life. 'The Yvonne Rainer Project' (2010) featured three of Rainer's works accompanied by cinema screenings of her seven feature films and an engaging video programme by contemporary artists exploring choreography for the camera. The final BFI Gallery exhibition was a playful return to the past created by Tate prize nominated Phil Collins. In Phil Collins: 'Marxism Today' audiences encountered film, video and photographic snapshots of life in the former East Germany offset by the illuminating recollections of teachers of Marxism–Leninism who lived and worked in the GDR.

The Gallery was closed as part of the BFI's review of all its activities following the Government's decision to cut grant-in aid by 15% over four years. The space vacated by the Gallery was redeveloped to house the BFI Reuben Library which opened in 2012. A commemorative book, 'The BFI Gallery Book', was published in January 2011.
