= King's Yard =

Coordinates: 8.4888°N 13.23806°W

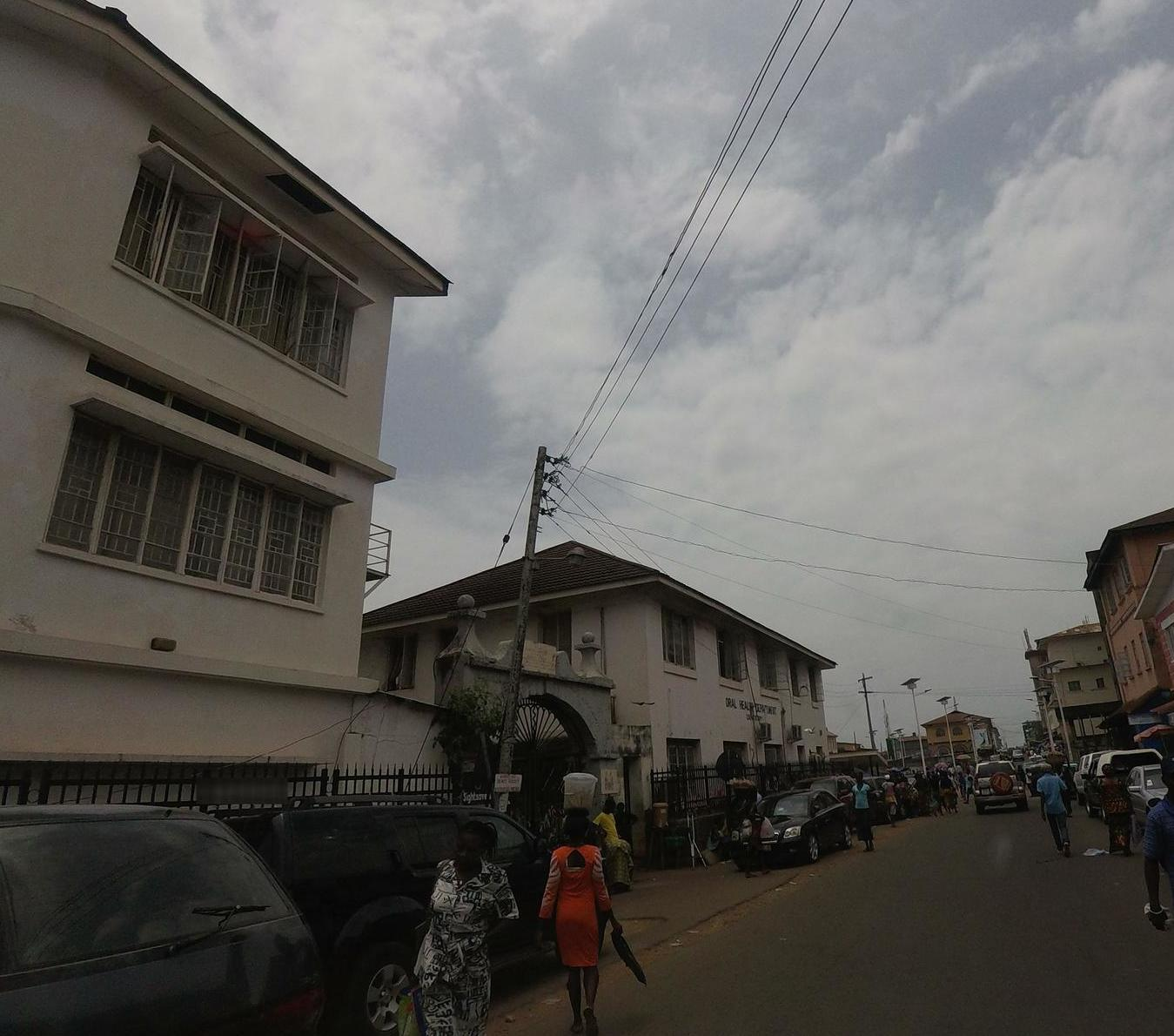
Gateway to the Old Kings Yard today

The King's Yard was a facility developed in Freetown, Sierra Leone, in which newly liberated Africans were taken after being dropped off in the colony from ships captured by the West Africa Squadron. This fleet had established by the Royal Navy in 1808 as part of the suppression of the slave trade. Parliament passed the Slave Trade Act 1807, which led to the blockade of Africa. Although initially limited to British ships, it was extended through a series of treaties to encompass other ships under the jurisdiction of Portugal, Spain and the Netherlands. In the King's Yard the slaves were processed and given medical treatment, leading to the yard being referred to as an asylum.

The building was converted to a hospital in 1880 after the end of the slave trade. It was initially named Colonial Hospital, and is now Central Government Hospital. A stone slab at the extant gateway reads:

“Royal Asylum and Hospital for Africans rescued from slavery by British Valour and Philanthropy. Erected AD MDCC XVII – H.E. Lt. Col. MacCarthy“.

The gateway was declared a National Monument in May 1949.
