= Norman Engleback =

English architect

Norman Engleback (5 October 1927 – 4 December 2015) was an English architect. He worked for the London County Council, and was the lead architect on the Queen Elizabeth Hall, the Purcell Room and the Hayward Gallery on the South Bank; and the National Recreation Centre at Crystal Palace (now the National Sports Centre).

Norman Engleback was born on 5 October 1927 in Islington, London, the son of William Engleback, a north London scientific instrument maker, and his wife, Elsie (née Parry), a clerk to a manufacturer of floor polish. He died on 4 December 2015.

National Life Stories conducted an oral history interview (C467/62) with Norman Engleback in 2001 for its Architects Lives' collection held by the British Library.
