= Jane and Louise Wilson =

British artists

Jane Wilson and Louise Wilson RA Elect (born 1967 in Newcastle upon Tyne) are British artists who work together as a sibling duo. Jane and Louise Wilson's art work is based in video, film and photography. They are YBA artists who were nominated for the Turner Prize in 1999.

== Lives and careers ==
=== The collaboration begins ===
Louise studied for a BA at Duncan of Jordanstone College of Art, Dundee, and Jane at Newcastle Polytechnic (1989). For their degree show they submitted identical work (photographs where they appeared to be murdering each other, one by drowning, one with a noose).

Jane and Louise Wilson then studied together on the MA course at Goldsmiths College, London (1990–1992). When they left art school, they lived in King's Cross and made films of small living spaces, such as bed and breakfast rooms. Another early film showed them taking LSD for the first time.

Jane and Louise Wilson's work together includes multiscreen video installations and photo-pieces; their artworks often feature institutional spaces, for example an oil rig, the archives of the Stasi in East Berlin (the building had previously been used by the Nazis and Stalin's Russia), The Houses of Parliament, and the Apollo Pavilion in Peterlee designed by Victor Pasmore.

=== Turner Prize 1999 ===
The pair were nominated for the Turner Prize in 1999, cited for their exhibition, Gamma at the Lisson Gallery in London. On the run up to the Turner Prize winner announcement, they also had a solo exhibition at the Serpentine Gallery in London (1999). Art works that were exhibited included Stasi City, Parliament (A Third House), and Gamma, a multiscreen video installation that was filmed at the former US military base at Greenham Common in Berkshire. This site was used to house nuclear cruise missiles during the Cold War and decommissioned in 1992. The Wilsons' video moves through the deserted institution, where nothing is now happening, evoking disturbing memories and possibilities. There is a sense of unease and threat, implied but never realised. They are the only characters in the film, appearing in military-style skirts and polished black shoes.

=== 2000s ===
In 2003, the Wilsons developed their work with greater complexity, involving not only multiple projections but also a variety of differently positioned surfaces as screens in the art work and exhibition A Free and Anonymous Monument (2003). It includes films of a microchip factory, playing children, a lake, a rusting oil rig and the Apollo Pavilion in Peterlee New Town, near Gateshead.

In 2009, they created Unfolding the Aryan Papers, based on the extensive research they conducted at the Stanley Kubrick Archive, University of the Arts, London. A commission by Animate Projects and the British Film Institute through the contemporary arts programme of the BFI Gallery, where the resulting installation was presented

Their 2010–11 film installation Face Scripting: What did the Building See? explored surveillance, architecture and visibility through the site of a political assassination in Dubai. Presented at the Sharjah Biennial, it brought together CCTV footage showing events leading up to and following the assassination alongside material filmed by the Wilsons, including hotel interiors in Sharjah, a room in the Dubai hotel where the incident occurred, and their London studio, and incorporated texts by Eyal Weizman and Shumon Basar.

In 2013–14, Jane and Louise Wilson had a solo exhibition at Whitworth Art Gallery in Manchester, England which addressed the aftermath of atrocities. Their works Blind Landings (H-bomb Test Site, Orford Ness) #1-6 are in the collection and on display at Tate Britain.

In 2018, Jane and Louise Wilson were elected to be Royal Academicians.

From September 18, 2018 – March 31, 2019, the Metropolitan Museum of Art displayed Stasi City “widely considered one of the most important works of video art of the last half century...”

Their work Performance of Entrapment was shown in London from summer 2025 until January 2026. It was inspired by Roman remains found during building works in London and also ancient shrines in Japan, with idea of sacred architecture, time, memory and renewal.
