= Aeolian Tower =

Coordinates: 51.5072°N 0.1155°W

The Aeolian Tower was an art installation on the South Bank of the River Thames in London, consisting of a 15-metre (49 ft) steel tower covered in 1200 wind-powered LEDs. The tower was in place beside the Waterloo Bridge for three days, from November 14–16, 2008. The intent in creating the Aeolian Tower was to prove in a demonstrable and clearly visible to the public fashion how green energy could be used for different purposes such as artistic and design elements.

== See also ==
- List of towers
