= Cultural history of the United Kingdom =

The culture of the United Kingdom has been shaped throughout history by the various groups of the British Isles and influences from continental Europe, with the British Empire and modern globalisation resulting in mixture with other cultures in recent centuries.

== Ancient era ==
Throughout its history, the culture of Great Britain has primarily consisted of the separate native traditions of England, Scotland and Wales. With regard to cultural influences, prior to the expansion of the British Empire, the island had been most notably influenced by French culture (via the Normans), Scandinavian culture (via the Vikings) and Italian culture (via the Romans).

The arrival of Celtic and Germanic tribes influenced Britain's early development. The Celtic peoples introduced unique languages, traditions, and social structures. The ancient Roman occupation of Britain, lasting almost 400 years, also impacted the linguistic and cultural identity of Great Britain. Subsequently, the migrations of Germanic tribes, such as the Anglo-Saxons, further influenced the cultural landscape.

== Modern era ==
=== British Empire ===
The British Empire played an ever-increasing role in British life from the late 18th century onwards, as the economic impact and travel opportunities of colonialism saw greater British integration into the world. These encounters with the world had a debated impact on the formation of British national identity. British culture dispersed across the world and was absorbed into the colonies in various ways, some of which gradually undermined and eventually helped to disband the empire.

=== Industrial Revolution ===
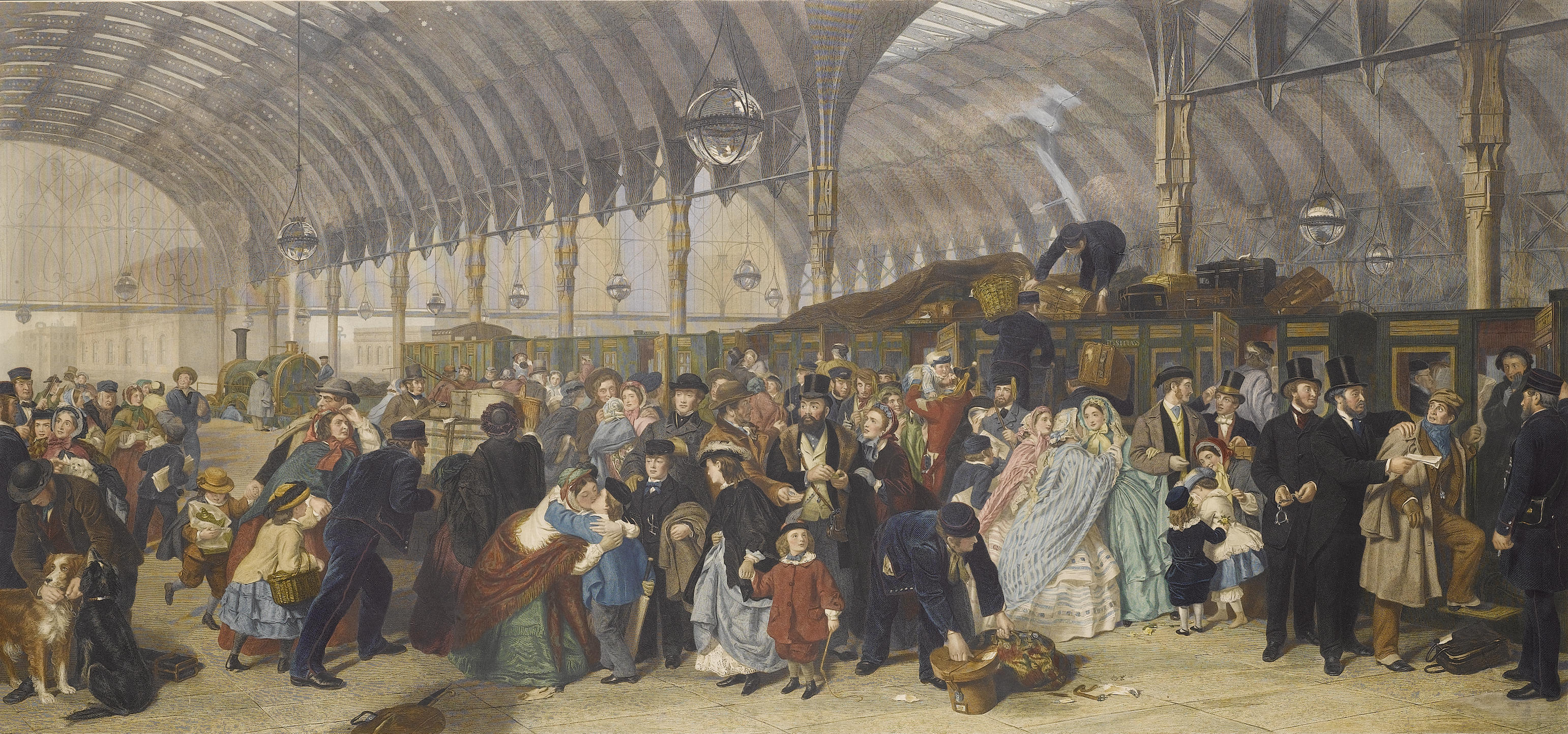
Frith's The Railway Station, 1862 depiction of Paddington railway station in London

Life in Great Britain during the Industrial Revolution shifted from an agrarian-based society to an urban, industrialised society. New social and technological ideas were developed, such as the factory system and the steam engine. Work became more regimented, disciplined, and moved outside the home with large segments of the rural population migrating to the cities.

== Contemporary era ==
Throughout the imperial era and with the decline of the British Empire after World War II, Britain developed a more diverse cultural landscape through higher levels of immigration. The decline of imperial power also impacted society and culture; for example, cricket, which had been the most popular British sport for centuries and which had become identified with the imperial vision, lost ground to football.

After the war ended, a sense of ease returned to society, though quality of life was still somewhat low in the 1950s. Television and Americanisation led to greater cultural fluidity as well as fears of change. The social history of the nation also began to be studied more intensely.

=== Post-Cold War ===
Following the Fall of the Berlin Wall in 1989 and EU enlargement in 2004 and 2007, the UK experienced a significant rise in immigration from Eastern Europe. Today, the UK has a sizable immigrant population, and encompasses the cultures of British people from various backgrounds, with South Asian, Continental European, African and Caribbean descent being most prevalent.

== See also ==
- History of the United Kingdom
