= Jean-Pierre Bekolo =

Cameroonian film director

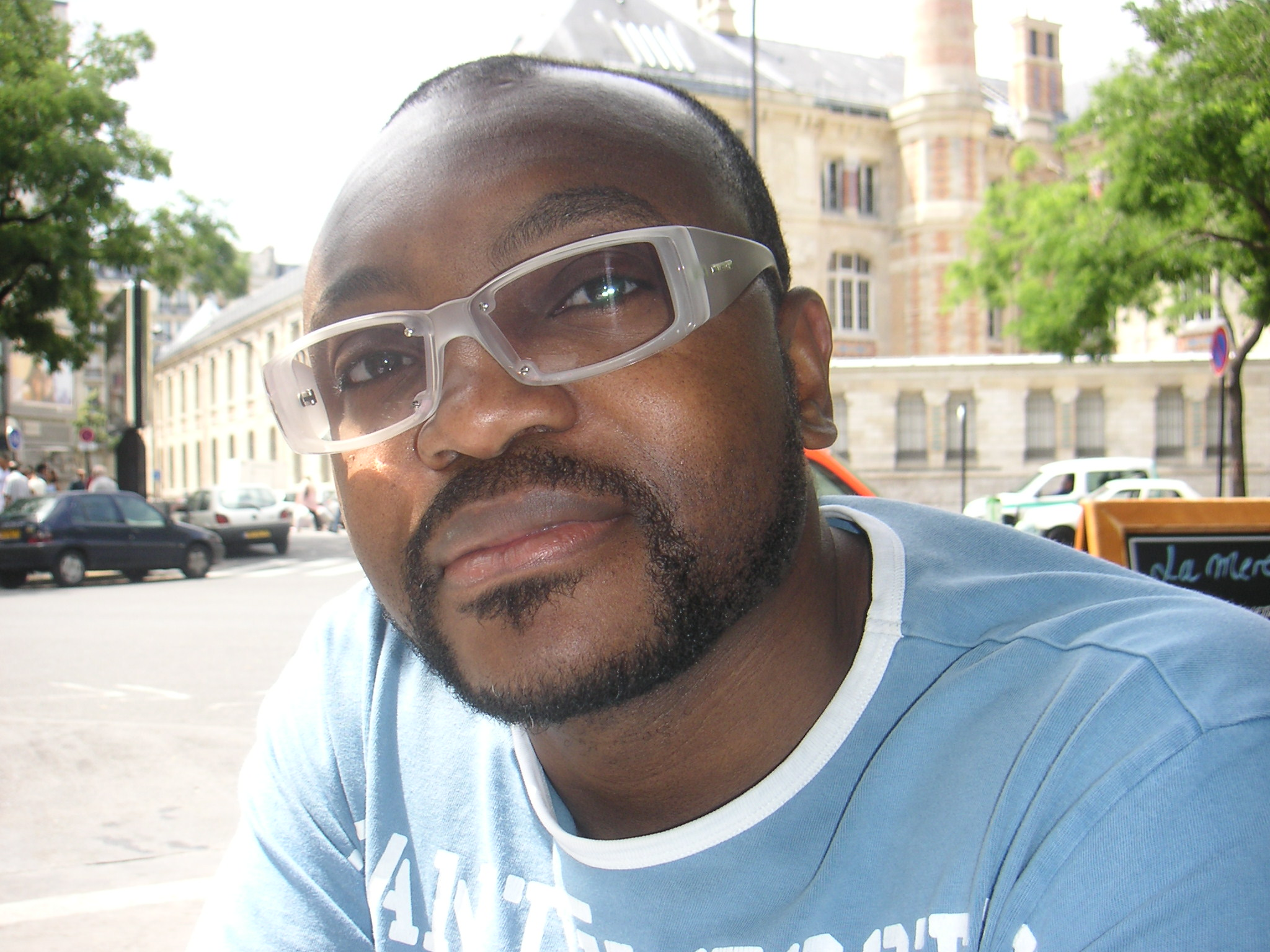
- Jean Pierre Bekolo in Paris in 2005
- Born: June 8, 1966 (age 59); Yaoundé, Cameroon
- Citizenship: Cameroonian
- Education: physics, University of Yaounde
- Alma mater: University of Yaounde
- Occupation: Film Director
- Awards: 2005-Holden Award for Best Script-special mention at Torino Film Festival for Les Saignantes

Jean-Pierre Bekolo (born June 8, 1966 in Yaoundé, Cameroon) is a Cameroon film director.

== Background and career ==
Jean-Pierre Bekolo was born in 1966 in Yaounde, Cameroon. He studied physics at the University of Yaounde in Cameroon from 1984 to 1987. He then studied in the National Institution of Audiovisuals (INA) in Bry-sur-Marne, France, under French film theorist Christian Metz. He returned to Cameroon to work as an editor for Cameroonian television.

Bekolo is currently living across France, the United States, and Cameroon, where he is engaged in many activities like media, education and cinema. He has taught filmmaking at the University of North Carolina at Chapel Hill (2001), Virginia Tech (1998), and Duke University (2003). Most notably, he developed a new teaching method called "Author Learning," based on the filmmaking experience to stimulate students who thrive in a learning environment that consists of building instead of classical instruction methods.

He was introduced in the 1992 Cannes Film Festival at 25 years old for his first feature film Quartier Mozart. Bekolo's film tells the audience the story of a young girl magically transformed into a swaggering Casanova nicknamed "My Guy." The movie includes some eccentric side characters like a polygamist police chief whose daughter is seduced by "My Guy" and a witch who can make men's genitals disappear at a simple handshake. This film reimagines folk tales to take place in the setting of today, forming a vision of today's Africa by humorously combining westernized characters and the folk tale atmosphere. Quartier Mozart won him awards at film festivals in Cannes, Locarno, and Montreal and was nominated for a British Film Institute's award in 1993.

He was commissioned by the British Film Institute to produce a film that would be the African entry in a series of films commemorating the 100th anniversary of cinema. This film takes place in a southern African town where the only pastime is to watch violent Hollywood action films at the shabby “Cinema Africa” movie theater. An artsy film director nicknamed ET comes to the town to bring African cinema back. He manages to turn the “Cinema Africa” into the “Cinema Heritage” and only show African films. Two people- Cinema and Cineaste- fight over which kind of films African audiences would want to see, Hollywood action or indigenous films. Ultimately the film involves a discussion on cinema in the continent where non-African works dominate the screens.

After an 8-year hiatus, Bekolo returns to the scene with Those Who Bleed (FR: Les Saignantes), a film about two young women set out to rid the country of its corrupt and sex-obsessed powerful men. The film is considered one of the first science fiction films from Africa. He won the Silver Etalon de Yennenga for his work for this film at the Ouagadougou Panafrican Film and Television Festival.

Controversy surrounded Bekolo’s Le President (2013). This film depicts a president in office for 42 years who takes a sudden road trip close to an important electoral meeting. His disappearance is watched by the media, political opponents, and even prisoners and causes a war of who will be the successor. While on his journey he sees the disastrous consequences of a prolonged reign over his country. Following the kidnapping and torture of a filmmaker who made a film with the same topic in 2009 and with the story reflecting Cameroon’s own president at the time Paul Biya who had been in office for thirty years at the time, the film was screened only once and banned in the country.

The film tells the story of three women in love with the same man who is sentenced to death in South Africa in the 1960s. One woman arriving from Europe to support the condemned, another is the condemned man’s wife who runs a bed and breakfast next to the prison, and the last woman teaching French classes in the prison. The film goes through the psychological journey of prisoners on death row and the emotional torment that everyone related to the prisoner goes through. In 2019, Bekolo won the Ecobank Foundation’s Sembene Ousmane prize for this film.

The filmmaker continues his research and his work. In 2016, he directed Naked Reality, an experimental afro-futuristic film and then in 2017, he directed the documentary Africa, thought in motion pt. I and II, which explores schools of thought in Dakar, and Miraculous Weapons, a story of human freedom and the freedom of expression. A tribute to Jean-Pierre Bekolo was held at the Quai Branly Museum in Paris from October 13 to 14 in 2018.

== Education ==
- Studied physics at University of Yaounde
- Institut national de l'audiovisuel INA in France, under Christian Metz.

== Awards and features ==
- 1992-Swissair/Crossair Special Prize and Golden Leopard Nominee at the Locarno International Film Festival for Quartier Mozart.
- 1992-, Montreal First film prize-Special mention at the Montreal world Film Festival for Quartier Mozart
- 1993 - British Film Institute award, for Quartier Mozart.
- 1997 - Le Complot d'Aristotle (Aristotle's Plot) featured at Sundance Film Festival.
- 2005 - Les Saignantes premiered at Toronto International Film Festival.
- 2005-Holden Award for Best Script-special mention at Torino Film Festival for Les Saignantes
- 2007- Silver Etalon de Yennega at Ouagadougou Panafrican Film and Television Festival for Les Saignantes
- 2019-Most Innovative Feature Film at City of Angels Film Festival for Les Saignantes

== Teaching ==
He had taught filmmaking at the following places:

- Virginia Tech, 1998
- University of North Carolina at Chapel Hill, 2001
- Duke University, 2003

== Filmography ==
- Quartier Mozart — 1992
- Aristotle's Plot (Le Complot d'Aristotle) — 1996
- The Bloodettes (Les Saignantes) — 2005
- The President (Le Président) — 2013
- Mudimbe's Order of Things (Les Choses et les mots de Mudimbe) — 2015
- A la recherche d'Obama perdu — 2015
- Naked Reality — 2016
- Afrique, la Pensée en Mouvement Part I et II — 2017
- Our Wishes — 2017
- Miraculous Weapons (Les Armes miraculeuses) — 2017

== Exhibitions ==
- Welcome To Applied Fiction, SAVVY Contemporary, Berlin/ Germany, February 2016
