= Denys Blakeway =

British television producer and author

Denys Blakeway is a British television producer and author who is best known for documentaries and books about contemporary history.

In 1994, he set up Blakeway Productions, a television company based in London. Before establishing himself as an independent producer, Blakeway wrote and directed a number of documentaries for the BBC and Channel 4, including Primo Levi: The Memory of the Offence, The Falklands War; and Thatcher - The Downing Street Years. He has also been responsible for several documentaries about former British prime ministers, all made with their participation: Edward Heath, John Major and Tony Blair

Since setting up Blakeway Productions, Blakeway has produced numerous programmes for British radio and television, including many documentaries about the British royal family, the Second World War, several series with historians Christopher Clark, Max Hastings, Niall Ferguson and David Reynolds, and arts programmes with artist and critic Matt Collings. In 2004, Blakeway Productions was acquired by the Ten Alps plc media group.

Latter television productions include a number of programmes about the causes of the First World War, including The Necessary War, written and presented by Max Hastings, which argued that the British were right to enter the conflict against Germany, and Royal Cousins at War, which told the story of the tensions between the royal houses of Europe in the years leading up to the war, both for BBC 2.

Past productions include profiles of King George V and Queen Mary for BBC 2, George and Mary: The Royals who Rescued the Monarchy" and an award-winning ninety-minute programme about the artist Lucian Freud, Lucian Freud: Painted Life, also for BBC 2. A three-part series about Queen Victoria's fraught relations with her children was broadcast on BBC2 in January 2013, and Blakeway was responsible for the BBC's 90 minute official obituary of Margaret Thatcher, Margaret Thatcher: Prime Minister, which was transmitted on BBC1 on the day that her death was announced. The obituary was subsequently shown by television stations around the world.

Blakeway made a 2012 video, The Plot to Topple a King, about the abdication of Edward VIII, in which Blakeway attributes the abdication to the machinations of the Archbishop of Canterbury, Cosmo Lang.

Blakeway is the author of The Last Dance, an account of the turbulent year of 1936,The Falklands War and Fields of Thunder-Testing Britain's Bomb.

Blakeway has also written and presented numerous programmes for BBC Radio 4, including the Peabody award-winning The Unspeakable Atrocity, a documentary about the BBC and the Holocaust, produced by Nigel Acheson, and Remembrance, an archive based documentary about changing attitudes to remembering British war dead. In May 2013, Blakeway presented The Longest Suicide Note in History, a documentary about the Labour Party's disastrous 1983 general election campaign.
