= Handsworth Songs =

1986 British documentary film

- Poster for a 1987 showing at the Metro Cinema, Rupert Street, London.
- Directed by: John Akomfrah
- Produced by: Lina Gopaul
- Starring: Pervaiz Khan; Meera Syal; Yvonne Weekes
- Cinematography: Sebastian Shah
- Music by: Trevor Mathison
- Production company: Black Audio Film Collective
- Distributed by: Channel 4
- Release date: 24 October 1986
- Running time: 61 minutes
- Country: United Kingdom
- Languages: English; Jamaican Patois

Handsworth Songs is a 1986 British documentary film directed by John Akomfrah and produced by Lina Gopaul. It was filmed during the 1985 riots in Handsworth and London. The production company was the Black Audio Film Collective, who also wrote the screenplay. With cinematography by Sebastian Shah and music by Trevor Mathison, there were voice-overs by Pervais Khan, Meera Syal, Yvonne Weekes, Sachkhand Nanak Dham and Mr. McClean.

== Background ==
Handsworth Songs was commissioned by Channel 4 for their series Britain: The Lie of the Land and won seven prizes internationally, including the John Grierson Award for Best Documentary (BFI). The production company used their now renowned methods of intermixing newsreel, still photos and a sound mosaic, creating an experimental multi-layered narrative. The documentary had voiceovers and music and a blend of different transitions to evoke the feeling of a trance.

In the early 1980s Britain experienced economic decline and deep recession, which caused mass unemployment and rising house prices and stock market. This also led to racial tension. Riots also occurred in Brixton in 1981 and Handsworth in 1981.

The film looks at how people from the Caribbean and South Asia came to Britain after World War II, hoping for a better life. These early immigrants worked hard to build new lives, but often faced racism and unfair treatment. The film shows how their memories—both hopeful and painful—still affect younger generations.

The Black Audio Film Collective was founded in 1982 by seven young Black British artists and thinkers: John Akomfrah, Lina Gopaul, Reece Auguiste, Trevor Mathieson, Edward George, Avril Johnson, and Claire Joseph. In 1983 the Black Audio Film Collective came together to encourage a Black film culture within film and video, specifically looking at questions of Black representation, including colonial imagery and anti-racist/sexist film material. Their work includes Signs of Empire (1989), Images of Nationality and Handsworth Songs (1986).

In an interview with Paul Gilroy and Jim Pines, the Black Audio Film Collective define the specific audience for their films as an imaginary construction, films made for Diasporic peoples, rather than simply Black people. This is almost a marketing strategy to help define where they might be shown. It analyses the limits of definition of an audience.

== Release ==
The film had its premiere at the Birmingham Film and Television Festival on 24 October 1986. It aired on the Channel 4 series Britain: The Lie of the Land.

On Rotten Tomatoes, the film has a 100% score, based on 5 reviews.
