= David Olusoga =

British historian and television presenter (born 1970)

David Olusoga OBE
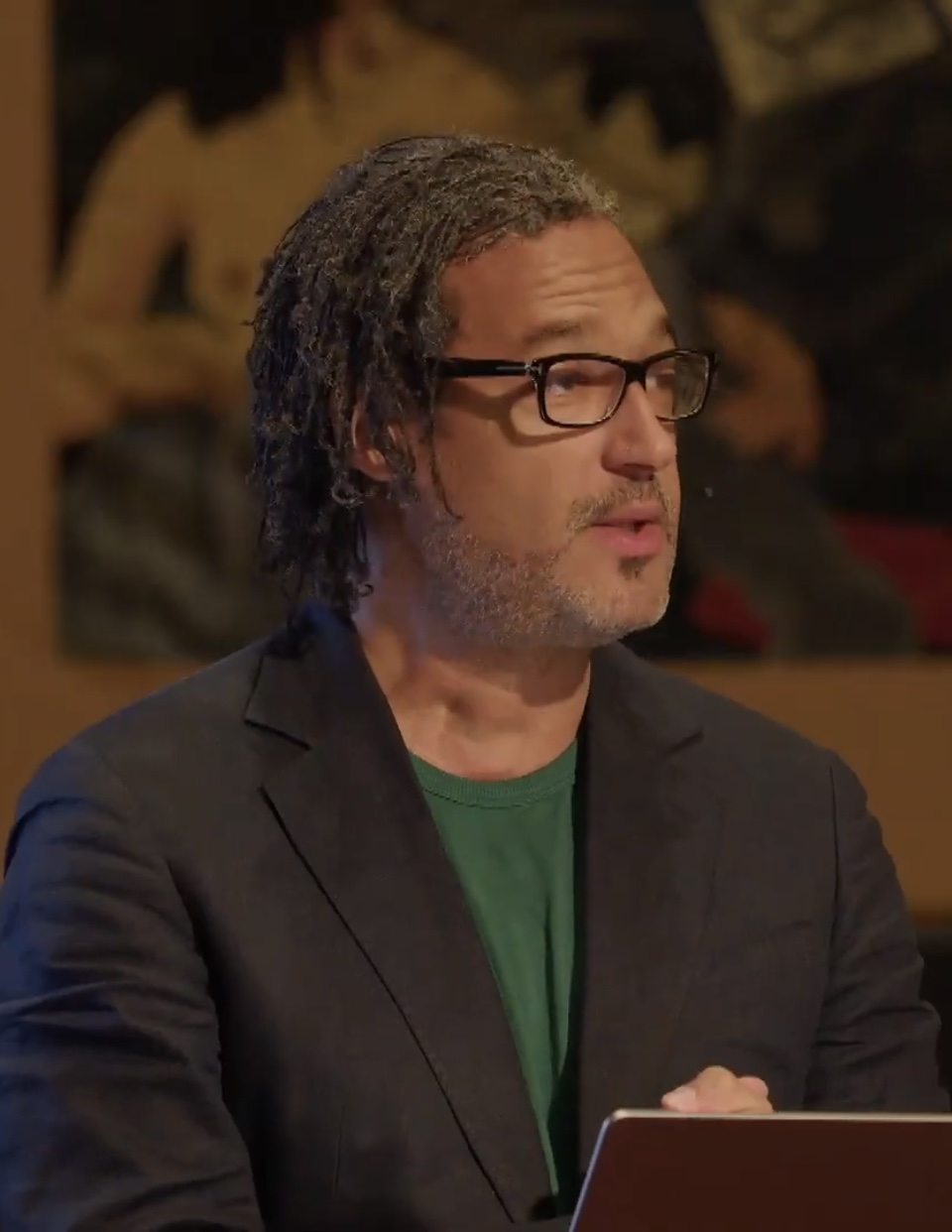
- Olusoga in 2022
- Born: David Adetayo Olusoga; January 1970 (age 56); Lagos, Nigeria
- Citizenship: British
- Education: University of Liverpool (BA); Leeds Trinity University
- Occupations: Historian, writer, broadcaster
- Writing career
- Language: English
- Notable work: Black and British: A Forgotten History (2016)
- Notable awards: Hessell-Tiltman Prize (2017); President's Medal, British Academy (2021)

David Adetayo Olusoga OBE (born January 1970) is a British-Nigerian historian, writer, broadcaster, and BAFTA winning film-maker. He is Professor of Public History at the University of Manchester. Olusoga has presented historical documentaries on the BBC, has contributed to The Guardian and is the author of Black and British: A Forgotten History (2016).

== Early life and education ==
David Olusoga was born in January 1970 in Lagos, Nigeria, the second child to a Nigerian father and British mother. At five years old, Olusoga migrated to the UK with his mother and grew up in Gateshead, Tyne and Wear. He was one of a very few non-white people living on a council estate. By the time he was 14, the National Front had attacked his house on more than one occasion, requiring police protection for him and his family. They were eventually forced to leave as a result of the racism. He later attended the University of Liverpool to study the history of slavery, and in 1994, graduated with a BA (Hons) History degree, followed by a postgraduate course in broadcast journalism at Leeds Trinity University.

== Career and recognition ==
Olusoga began his television career as a researcher on the 1999 BBC series Western Front presented by Professor Richard Holmes. He became a producer of history programmes after university, working from 2005 on programmes such as Namibia: Genocide and the Second Reich, The Lost Pictures of Eugene Smith and Abraham Lincoln: Saint or Sinner?.

Subsequently, he became a television presenter, beginning in 2014 with The World's War: Forgotten Soldiers of Empire, about the Indian, African and Asian troops who fought in the First World War, followed by other documentaries and appearances on BBC One television's The One Show. In 2015, it was announced that he would co-present Civilisations, a sequel to Kenneth Clark's 1969 television documentary series Civilisation, alongside the historians Mary Beard and Simon Schama. His most recent TV series include Black and British: A Forgotten History, The World's War, A House Through Time and the BAFTA award-winning Britain's Forgotten Slave Owners.

Olusoga has written stand-alone history books, as well as those accompanying his television series. He is the author of the 2016 book Black and British: A Forgotten History, which was awarded both the Longman–History Today Trustees Award 2017 and the PEN Hessell-Tiltman Prize 2017. His other books include The World's War, which won First World War Book of the Year in 2015, The Kaiser's Holocaust: Germany's Forgotten Genocide and the Colonial Roots of Nazism (2011), which he co-authored with Casper Erichsen, and Civilisations (2018). Olusoga contributed to the Oxford Companion to Black British History, and has written for The Guardian, The Observer, New Statesman and BBC History magazine; since June 2018 he has been a member of the board of the Scott Trust, which publishes The Guardian.

Olusoga was included in the 2019 and 2020 editions of the Powerlist, a ranking of the 100 most influential Black Britons. In the 2021 edition he made the Top 10 most influential, ranking eighth, and in the 2023 edition he ranked sixth.

He was appointed an Officer of the Order of the British Empire (OBE) in the 2019 New Year Honours for services to history and to community integration. He received his medal from King Charles III in February 2023.

On appointing him as a professor in 2019, the University of Manchester described him as an expert on military history, empire, race and slavery, and "one of the UK's foremost historians". Olusoga gave his inaugural professorial lecture on "Identity, Britishness and the Windrush" at the University of Manchester in May 2019.

In response to the global Black Lives Matter movement with protests after the murder of George Floyd, Olusoga's Black and British: A Forgotten History was re-broadcast, along with Britain's Forgotten Slave Owners, also fronted by Olusoga.

On 13 November 2020, the BBC announced that it had commissioned Barack Obama Talks To David Olusoga, a special programme in which Barack Obama discusses the first volume of his presidential memoirs, A Promised Land. The programme aired on 19 January 2021. In January 2021, Olusoga also appeared on BBC Radio 4's Desert Island Discs.

In December 2021, it was announced that Olusoga had been awarded the President's Medal by the British Academy. Olusoga is the 39th person to receive the medal, which has been awarded since 2010, and recognises services to the humanities and social sciences.

In 2024, Olusoga with his siblings Yinka and Kemi co-created the book Black History for Every Day of the Year, including an entry for each calendar day with details of an event, theme, person or place associated with "Black history" with the aim of integrating it into the mainstream of national history rather than relegating it only to "Black History Month".

In January 2025, it was announced that Olusoga has been appointed as an ambassador for the National Trust.

In March 2025, Olusoga began co-presenting "Journey Through Time", a history podcast produced by Goalhanger, hosted alongside historian Sarah Churchwell.

In May 2025, Olusoga was announced as a contestant on the first series of The Celebrity Traitors. Olusoga reached the final round alongside fellow faithfuls Joe Marler and Nick Mohammed and traitors Alan Carr and Cat Burns, but ultimately lost alongside Mohammed to Carr.

In May 2026, Olusoga was announced as a speaker at the 2026 Edinburgh International Book Festival and in June he presented Inaugural Frederick Douglass Lecture of the Manchester Literary and Philosophical Society.

== Awards and honours ==
- 2015: Royal Historical Society Public History Prize for Broadcasting for Britain's Forgotten Slave Owners (BBC History)
- 2015: World War One Book of the Year at the Paddy Power Political Book Awards for The World's War
- 2016: Specialist Factual BAFTA, BAFTA TV Awards for Britain's Forgotten Slave Owners
- 2017: Honorary Degree of Doctor of Letters, University of Liverpool
- 2017: Longman–History Today Trustees Award for Black and British
- 2017: PEN Hessell-Tiltman Prize for Black and British
- 2018: Honorary Degree of Doctor of Letters, University of Leeds
- 2019: Appointed Officer of the Order of the British Empire in the 2019 New Year Honours for services to history and to community integration
- 2019: Honorary Degree of Doctor of Laws, University of Leicester
- 2019: Elected Fellow of the Royal Society of Literature
- 2021: President's Medal, British Academy, for services to humanities and social sciences

== Filmography ==
- The World's War: Forgotten Soldiers of Empire (2014)
- Fighting for King and Empire: Britain's Caribbean Heroes (2015)
- The One Show (various episodes)
- Britain's Forgotten Slave Owners (2015)
- Black and British: A Forgotten History (2016)
- Timewatch: "British Empire – Heroes and Villains" and "Dictators and Despots" (both 2017)
- Civilisations (two of nine episodes, "First Contact" and "The Cult of Progress") (2018)
- A House Through Time (2018–2026)
- The Unwanted: The Secret Windrush Files (2019)
- Barack Obama Talks To David Olusoga (2020)
- Statue Wars: One Summer in Bristol (2021)
- Our NHS: A Hidden History (2021)
- The People's Piazza: A History of Covent Garden (2022)
- Union with David Olusoga (2023)
- The Celebrity Traitors (2025)
- Empire with David Olusoga (2025)
- Finding Britain's Slave Traders with David Olusoga (2026)

== Books ==
- The Kaiser's Holocaust: Germany's Forgotten Genocide and the Colonial Roots of Nazism (Faber and Faber, 2011); ISBN 978-0571231423 (with Casper W. Erichsen)
- The World's War (Head of Zeus, 2015); ISBN 978-1781858981
- Black and British: A Forgotten History (Macmillan, 2016); ISBN 978-1447299745
- Civilisations: First Contact/The Cult of Progress (Profile Books, 2018); ISBN 978-1781259979
- The Black History Book: Big Ideas Simply Explained (DK, 2021); ISBN 978-0744042146
- Black History for Every Day of the Year (Macmillan, 2024); ISBN 978-1529066203 (with Yinka Olusoga and Kemi Olusoga)
- In the Scene: Steve McQueen, by Jen Francis with David Olusoga & Dennis Lim, (Supernova Books, 2025); ISBN 9781913641177
