= John Akomfrah =

British artist, filmmaker, curator (born 1957)

Sir John Akomfrah CBE RA
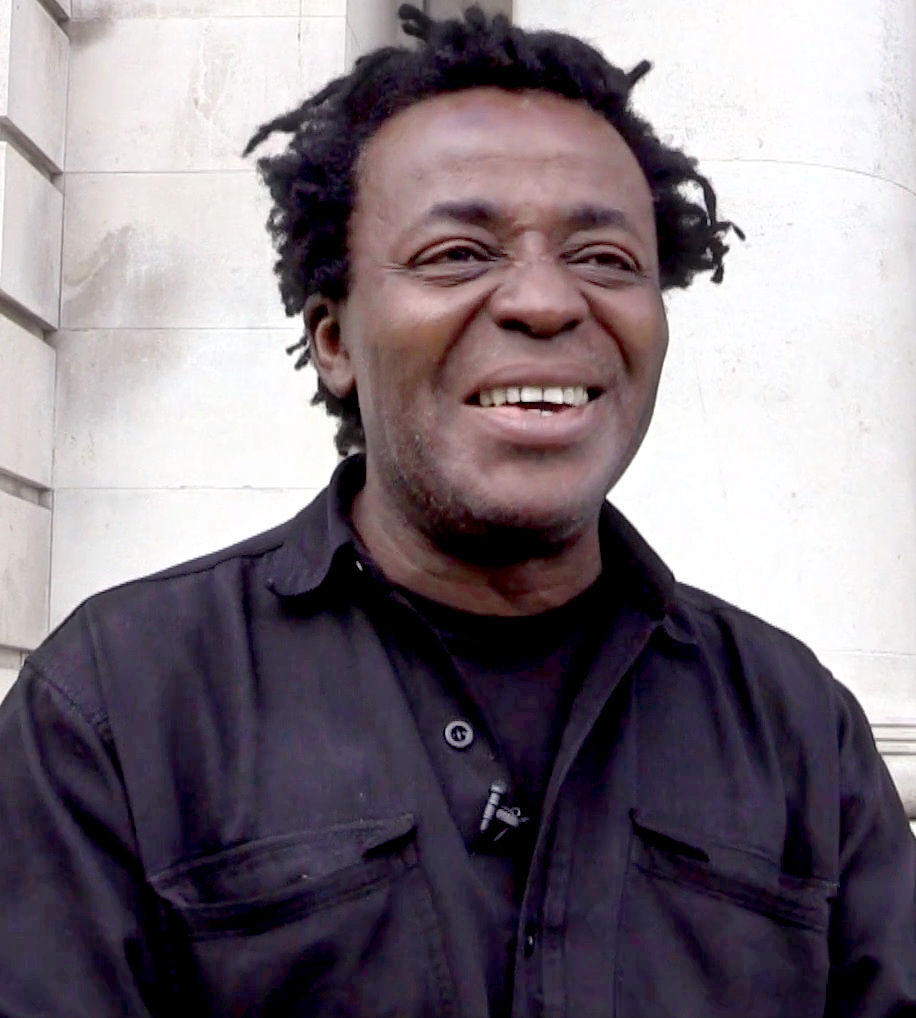
- Akomfrah at Artes Mundi 7, Cardiff, October 2016
- Born: 4 May 1957 (age 69); Accra, Dominion of Ghana
- Education: Portsmouth University
- Occupations: Film director, artist, curator
- Years active: 1986–present
- Notable work: Handsworth Songs (1986); Seven Songs for Malcolm X (1993); The Unfinished Conversation (2013); Purple (2017)
- Awards: Artes Mundi Prize
- Website: www.smokingdogsfilms.com

Sir John Akomfrah CBE RA (born 4 May 1957) is a Ghanaian-born British artist, writer, film director, screenwriter, theorist and curator of Ghanaian descent, whose "commitment to a radicalism both of politics and of cinematic form finds expression in all his films".

A founder of the Black Audio Film Collective in 1982, he made his début as a director with Handsworth Songs (1986), which examined the fallout from the 1985 Handsworth riots. Handsworth Songs went on to win the Grierson Award for Best Documentary in 1987.

With Lina Gopaul and David Lawson, his long-term producing partners, Akomfrah co-founded Smoking Dogs Films in 1998.

In the words of The Guardian, he "has secured a reputation as one of the UK's most pioneering film-makers [whose] poetic works have grappled with race, identity and post-colonial attitudes for over three decades." In the 2023 New Year Honours, he was the recipient of a knighthood in recognition of his services to the Arts.

Akomfrah was chosen to represent Britain at the Venice Biennale in 2024.

== Early life and education ==
John Akomfrah was born in Accra, Dominion of Ghana, to parents who were involved with anti-colonial activism. In an interview with Sukhdev Sandhu, Akomfrah said: "My dad was a member of the cabinet of Kwame Nkrumah's party.... We left Ghana because my mum's life was in danger after the coup of 1966, and my father died in part because of the struggle that led up to the coup." This struggle around his identity expresses itself in his "Conversations with Noise" that was part of the Five Murmurations (2021).

Akomfrah was educated in British schools since around the age of eight. His excellence as a student led him to showcase this struggle with this imbalance between Britain's colonization and his identity.

== Work ==
He was an influential creator in 1982, founding the Black Audio Film Collective, which was discontinued in 1998. In this organisation, he and others focused on the backlash the Black community in Britain received and the mental toll of their identities being affected.

In his films, Akomfrah experimented with sound to display the struggles the Black community in Britain face.

In 1998, together with Lina Gopaul and David Lawson, his long-term producing partners, Akomfrah founded Smoking Dogs Films.

From 2001 to 2007, he served as a Governor of the British Film Institute. From 2004 to 2013, he served as a governor of the film organisation Film London.

Akomfrah's work The Unfinished Conversation (2012) is a three-screen installation that focuses on the life of Stuart Hall, from his move from Jamaica to the UK in 1951 to study at the University of Oxford and his editorship at the New Left Review. It features clips from Hall's appearances on the BBC, quotations from other writers and archival footage of war, protests, police violence and independence movements in former British colonies. Frieze named the work No. 4 of "The 25 Best Works of the 21st Century".

Akomfrah has taught multiple courses at academic institutions, including Massachusetts Institute of Technology, Brown University, New York University, Westminster University, and Princeton University. A tri-campus three-day event entitled "Cinematic Translations: The Work of John Akomfrah" was held in November 2013 at the University of Toronto, where he was artist-in-residence. A Harvard Film Archive critique of his work states: "Akomfrah has become a cinematic counterpart to such commentators of and contributors to the culture of the Black diaspora as Stuart Hall, Paul Gilroy, Greg Tate and Henry Louis Gates. In doing so, he has continued to mine the audiovisual archive of the 20th century, recontextualizing these images not only by selecting and juxtaposing them but also through the addition of eloquent and allusive text."

== Solo presentations ==
Akomfrah has had solo presentations at Hirshhorn Museum and Sculpture Garden (2022), Institute of Contemporary Art/Boston (2019), Bildmuseet in Umeå, Sweden (2015), Broad Art Museum, East Lansing (2014), Tate Britain, London (2013), Institute of Contemporary Arts, London (2012), the Museum of Modern Art, New York (2011) and the British Film Institute, in the BFI Gallery (2010).

In 2013, his major work The Unfinished Conversation, a multi-layered installation, was shown in Tate Britain for six months in 2013, and was acquired for the National Collection. Marking its 10th anniversary, The Unfinished Conversation was remounted at the Midlands Arts Centre as part of the Birmingham 2022 festival.

His 2015 work, Vertigo Sea, is a three-screen film installation that was shown at the 56th Venice Biennale in May 2015. Vertigo Sea premiered in the UK at the Arnolfini in Bristol (16 January–10 April 2016) coinciding with an exhibition of new and recent work by Akomfrah being shown at Lisson Gallery. In October 2016, his 40-minute two-screen video installation Auto Da Fé, filmed in Barbados and inspired by the theme of 400 years of migration and religious persecution, went on show. Vertigo Sea premiered in the UK at the Arnolfini in Bristol (16 January–10 April 2016) coinciding with an exhibition of new and recent work by Akomfrah being shown in Cardiff.

Purple (2017), a 62-minute, six-screen video installation commissioned for the prominent Curve Gallery space at the Barbican, London, Akomfrah describes as "a response to [the] Anthropocene". A tie-in series of film screenings comprising selections made by Akomfrah was held from October 2017 at the Barbican Cinema. The installation has travelled to the Museo Nacional Thyssen-Bornemisza, Madrid; Bildmuseet Umeå, Sweden; the Boston Institute of Contemporary Art, Massachusetts; Hirshhorn Museum and Sculpture Garden, in Washington, DC; and Museu Coleção Berardo, Lisbon.

Following the onset of the COVID-19 pandemic and the worldwide George Floyd protests in 2020, Akomfrah began working on Five Murmurations (2021), a 55-minute, three-screen video, as a visual response to his sense that "it felt like there were almost two pandemics, overlapping, jostling and clashing with each other." Akomfrah premiered the film in a solo presentation at Lisson Gallery in New York in 2021. The film has since been shown in solo presentations at the Centraal Museum, Utrecht, in 2022; and the National Museum of African Art, Washington, D.C., in 2023.

In 2023, in the aftermath of the COVID-19 pandemic, Akomfrah debuted a new five-channel work titled Arcadia. Reflecting on The Columbian Exchange – the widespread transfer of plants, animals, precious metals, commodities, populations, technology, diseases and ideas between the Americas, Afro-Eurasia and Europe from the 1400s onwards – the film was shown at the Sharjah Biennial, before receiving its UK premiere at The Box in Plymouth where was on show until 2 June 2024.

On 24 January 2023, it was announced that Akomfrah would represent the UK at the 60th Venice Biennale in 2024.

From 4 November 2025 – 8 February 2026, the Museo Nacional Thyssen-Bornemisza and the TBA21Thyssen-Bornemisza Art Contemporary presented "John Akomfrah: Listening All Night To The Rain", a reimagining of Akomfrah's work for the British Pavilion at the 60th Venice Biennale.

In 2025, the Baltimore Museum of Art and the Menil Collection, Houston, commissioned Akomfrah "to create an immersive multichannel video installation." The work will premiere in Baltimore and remain on display from November 16, 2025 – February 1, 2026, before travelling to the Menil Collection from April 24 – October 11, 2026.

== Collections ==
Akomfrah's works are included in permanent collections of museums worldwide, including the Smithsonian's Hirshhorn Museum and Sculpture Garden, the Pérez Art Museum Miami, the Institute of Contemporary Art, Boston, among others.

== Awards and honours ==
Akomfrah was appointed as an Officer of the Order of the British Empire (OBE) in the 2008 New Year Honours for services to the film industry. In March 2012, he was awarded the European Cultural Foundation's Princess Margaret Award.

In 2013, he was awarded honorary doctorates from University of the Arts London and from Goldsmiths, University of London. In 2014, he was awarded an honorary doctorate from Portsmouth University, the reformed polytechnic from which he had graduated in 1982.

In 2017, Akomfrah won the biennial Artes Mundi Prize, the UK's biggest award for international art, having been chosen for the award for his "substantial body of outstanding work dealing with issues of migration, racism and religious persecution", including his work Auto Da Fé. Akomfrah said of his winning two-screen video installation, which explores the theme of mass migration over a 400-year period: "I wanted to focus on the fact that many people have to leave because something terrible is happening, it’s not just about leaving for a better life, many people feel they have to leave to have a life at all."

Akomfrah was appointed as a Commander of the Order of the British Empire (CBE) in the 2017 Birthday Honours for services to art and film making. He was named Artist of the Year in the 2018 Apollo Magazine Awards. He was elected a Royal Academician in 2019.

He was knighted in the 2023 New Year Honours for services to the arts.

== Filmography ==
- Handsworth Songs (1986); winner of Grierson Award for Best Documentary, 1987
- Testament (1988)
- Who Needs a Heart (1991)
- Seven Songs for Malcolm X (1993)
- The Last Angel of History (1996)
- Memory Room 451 (1996)
- Call of Mist (1998)
- Speak Like a Child (1998)
- Riot (1999)
- The Nine Muses (2010)
- Hauntologies (Carroll/Fletcher Gallery, 2012)
- The Stuart Hall Project (2013), relating to the cultural theorist Stuart Hall
- The Unfinished Conversation (2013)
- The March (2013)
- Vertigo Sea (2015)
- Auto Da Fé (2016)
- Untitled (2016)
- The Airport (2016)
- Tropikos (2016)
- Purple (2017)
- Precarity (2018)
- Five Murmurations (2021)
- Arcadia (2023)
