= Black Audio Film Collective =

Black British film collective founded in 1982

The Black Audio Film Collective (BAFC), founded in 1982 and active until 1998, comprised seven Black British and diaspora multimedia artists and film makers: John Akomfrah, Lina Gopaul, Avril Johnson, Reece Auguiste, Trevor Mathison, Edward George and Claire Joseph. Joseph left in 1985 and was replaced by David Lawson. The group initially came together as students at Portsmouth Polytechnic (their backgrounds included sociology, fine art and psychology), and after graduation relocated to Hackney in east London.

== Background ==
The formation of the Black Audio Film Collective, like that of Sankofa Film and Video Collective, was a response to the social unrest in Britain in the 1980s: "Influenced by contemporary debate on post-colonialism and social theorists such as Homi Bhabha and Stuart Hall, both groups centered around investigations of black identity/culture within the British experience and reworked the documentary to articulate new voices in British cinema."

== Style ==
The BAFC's output has been variously described as "an extraordinary body of poetic, allusive, and intensely personal films, videos, and 'slide-tape texts' that chronicled England’s multicultural past and present and pushed the boundaries of the documentary form", and as "the expression of a generation of diasporic subjects that seized the idea of 'blackness' as an identity marker as well as a claim to political visibility." The pioneering films they produced are still considered influential.

According to Guardian critic Adrian Searle, "the works the BAFC made during the 80s and early 1990s are almost shocking in their range.... The collective was heavily informed by film and psychoanalytic theory, by political discussion and debate.... Perhaps the most significant achievement of the group was the formulation of a poetic, a tone of voice, a particular kind of filmic space that resisted categorisation." In the words of Kodwo Eshun, they "projected a stance of high seriousness with seductive stylishness".

BAFC produced what the British Film Institute identifies as "some of the most challenging and experimental documentaries in Britain in the 1980s". Notable among their oeuvre is 1986's Handsworth Songs, a film essay that makes unconventional use of newsreel and archive material of the autumn 1985 civil disturbances in Birmingham and London to explore memories of immigration and the different ways in which race was experienced and British society dealt with the black presence. Kodwo Eshun, writing in 2004, referred to the reputation of Handsworth Songs "as the most important and influential art film to emerge from England in the last twenty years."

The collective was dissolved in 1998, after which John Akomfrah, Lina Gopaul and David Lawson went on to found Smoking Dogs Films. The first major retrospective of the BAFC, entitled The Ghosts of Songs, toured between 2 February and 1 April 2007.

== Selected filmography ==
- Expeditions: Signs of Empire.
- Images of Nationality (1983–84)
- Handsworth Songs (1986)
- Testament (1988)
- Twilight City (1989)
- Mysteries of July (1991)
- Who Needs a Heart (1991)
- A Touch of the Tar Brush (1992)
- Seven Songs for Malcolm X (1993)
- The Mothership Connection (1995)
- The Last Angel of History (1995)
- Three Songs on Pain, Light and Time (1995)
- Memory Room 451 (1997)
- Martin Luther King: Days of Hope (1997)
- Gangsta Gangsta: The Tragedy of Tupac Shakur (1998)

== See also ==
- Sankofa Film and Video Collective
