= Museum of the Moving Image, London =

Former Museum

Coordinates: 51°30′24″N 0°06′54″W

MOMI logo.

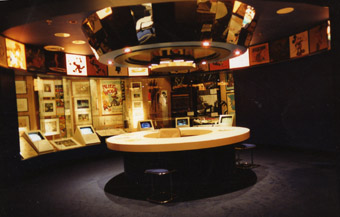
The ceiling of MOMI's animation area revolved. Its design was based on a 19th-century Praxinoscope.

The Museum of the Moving Image (MOMI) was a museum of the history of cinema technology and media sited below Waterloo Bridge in London. It was opened on 15 September 1988 by Prince Charles and at the time, was the world's largest museum devoted entirely to cinema and television.

The museum formed part of the cultural complex on the South Bank of the River Thames. MOMI was mainly funded by private subscription and operated by the British Film Institute. MOMI was closed in 1999, initially on a supposedly temporary basis, and with the intention of its being relocated to Jubilee Gardens nearby. Its permanent closure was announced in 2002.

== Development ==
MOMI was the brainchild of National Film Theatre Controller Leslie Hardcastle. Hardcastle's vision was realised by significant fundraising by then Director of the BFI, Anthony Smith and a development team including David Francis, David Robinson, Charles Beddow (1929-2012), Chief Technical Officer of the National Film Theatre, and the designer Neal Potter.

Smith raised the museum's £15m project costs entirely from private sources.

== Museum interpretation ==
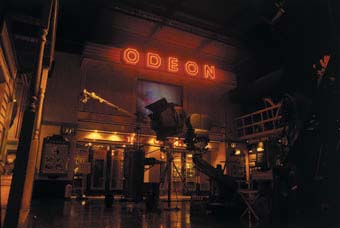
The art deco Odeon within MOMI was in contrast to the working Hollywood 'factory' studio set in front of it.

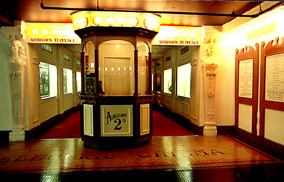
The early 'low-class' electric cinemas were contrasted with other more respected cultures of the first few years of the 20th century.

Interpretation was done through graphics, interactive exhibits, recreated environments, models, six 35 mm film projections using endless loop platters, two 16 mm film projections, two 70 mm projectors, and over 70 LaserDisc players for video playback. There was also a group of six actors dressed in period costume (e.g. a Victorian magic lanternist and a Hollywood director).

A few months before MOMI opened in 1988, the animator Chuck Jones was invited to create a chase sequence directly onto the high walls of the museum. Jones spent several days working on high scaffolding to create the work. At the lowest level on a door was a smaller drawing (not part of the chase) which Jones used to try out the pens.

Animation played an important role in MOMI. Channel Four funded the Channel Four/MOMI animator in residence scheme. Winners of the competition developed a short film in the 'goldfish bowl', a three-meter (10') square glass box; this allowed the public to see the animator's every move. Over forty films were produced and they won many awards worldwide.

Prior to opening, the museum bought Marilyn Monroe's black dress from the 1959 film Some Like It Hot, for £19,800. The event featured on the front pages of many UK newspapers.

There was a busy education department with two education rooms and a small cinema for special events. The museum was available for private hire for corporate events or parties.

== List of galleries ==
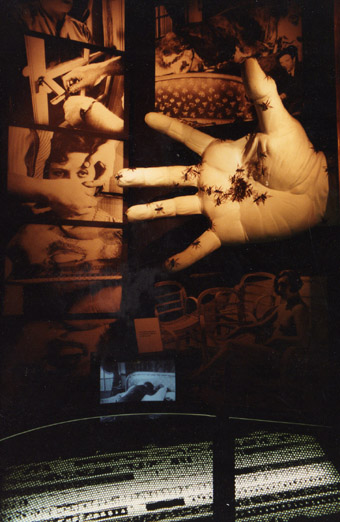
Surreal cinema was just one of the genres of film displayed within MOMI.

Galleries in the museum included Tricking the Eye, Shadow puppets, Early optical device, The Phantasmagoria, Optical toys, Photography, Magic lanterns, Projection, Persistence of vision, The arrival of Cinema (Lumiere Brothers), Early Technical advances, British Pioneers including Birt Acres, Méliès, The early cinemas World War I, The formation of Hollywood, The Temple to the Gods of the Silent Cinema, Charlie Chaplin, The Russian Agit prop Train, Experimental Film, German Expressionism, The coming of sound film, Censorship, Newsreel, The Documentary Movement, Cinema of France, Animation, The Hollywood Studio System, The Great Days of Cinema Going in Britain including Odeon Cinemas, British film, World War II, Cinema architecture, The arrival of television, Expansion of television, Cinema fights television, World Cinema, Television heritage, Television today, a Doctor Who exhibit that was used in several documentaries about the early years of the show, plus a temporary exhibition area.

A series of temporary exhibitions were held in the final room at the end of the museum tour:

- The World of Jim Henson
- Magical Lanterns
- Charlie Chaplin's Centenary
- Catching the Action: Muybridge and the Chronophotographers
- Ray Harryhausen: Creatures of Fantasy
- Behind the Sofa: Doctor Who at MoMI
- Irn-Bru Pop Video
- The Western: West of the Mississippi and North of the Rio Grande
- Judy Garland
- Georges Méliès
- Special Effects in the Cinema
- Imagine (the next 100 years of the moving image)

== Museum building ==
MOMI was housed in a glass-sided steel framed metal-clad building (designed by Bryan Avery of Avery Associates Architects), with red roofs running along each side of Waterloo Bridge.

== Legacy ==
An exhibition called Moving Pictures ran at the Sheffield Millennium Galleries 14 February – 19 May 2002. The exhibition offered a scaled down version of MOMI using actors and items from the museum collection to tell the history of the moving image. It was planned as the first location of a touring exhibition but was not well received and the tour was cancelled. Later in October 2002 the BFI announced it no longer planned to host MOMI.

The MOMI programme was discontinued and its site reopened as BFI Southbank on 14 March 2007, providing a new entrance to the National Film Theatre complex. A programme of commissioned artists' moving image work was seen as a better fit for the BFI's remit to promote the moving image in all its forms than that of MOMI: an Exhibitions Department was established and a contemporary art gallery dedicated to the moving image opened, the BFI Gallery, which itself was replaced in 2012 by the BFI Reuben Library. The remaining site incorporated the existing three cinemas showcasing the best historical and contemporary film from around the world, a mediatheque of British film and television, and a bookshop within an active programme that includes the annual London Film Festival.

Although there was talk that Bradford's National Media Museum planned to open a London venue, London still has no publicly funded film museum.

In April 2018 one of the lead members of the original MOMI team, David Francis, with his wife Jocelyn Marsh (daughter of award-winning production designer Terence Marsh), opened the Kent Museum of the Moving Image in Deal, Kent.

== See also ==
- London Film Museum
- Cinema Museum (London)
