= British Film Institute Fellowship =

Award

- Awarded for: Outstanding Contribution to Film or Television Culture
- Country: United Kingdom
- Presented by: British Film Institute
- First award: 1983
- Website: BFI Fellows

The British Film Institute (BFI) is a charitable organisation established in 1933, based in the United Kingdom. It has awarded its Fellowship title to individuals in "recognition of their outstanding contribution to film or television culture" and is considered the highest accolade presented by the Institute: British actor John Hurt said the award was "the highest honour possible".

The first awards were made in 1983, the same year as BFI National Archive's Silver Jubilee and the BFI's fiftieth anniversary, and as of February 2023, there are 91 Fellows. Awards are not presented every year, but every award ceremony has been held in London, on occasion at the National Film Theatre as part of the BFI London Film Festival. The inaugural ceremony honoured six recipients of the Fellowship: French film director Marcel Carné, British film directors David Lean, Michael Powell, Hungarian screenwriter Emeric Pressburger, Indian filmmaker Satyajit Ray and American filmmaker and actor Orson Welles. The most recent Fellowship was bestowed in 2025 on Tom Cruise.

Following allegations of numerous sexual assaults and harassment, American producer Harvey Weinstein was stripped of the fellowship that was originally awarded to him in 2002.

Of the 91 Fellows, the majority (60) are from the United Kingdom, with 31 foreign recipients, mainly from the United States and France. There have been two African winners, both film directors, Malian Souleymane Cissé and Senegalese Ousmane Sembène while one recipient has come from each of Japan, India, Iran, Canada, and Australia.

== Fellows ==
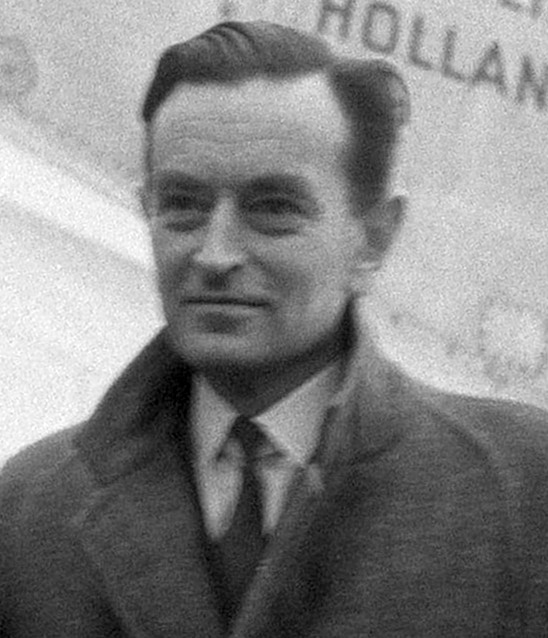
David Lean received the Fellowship in 1983

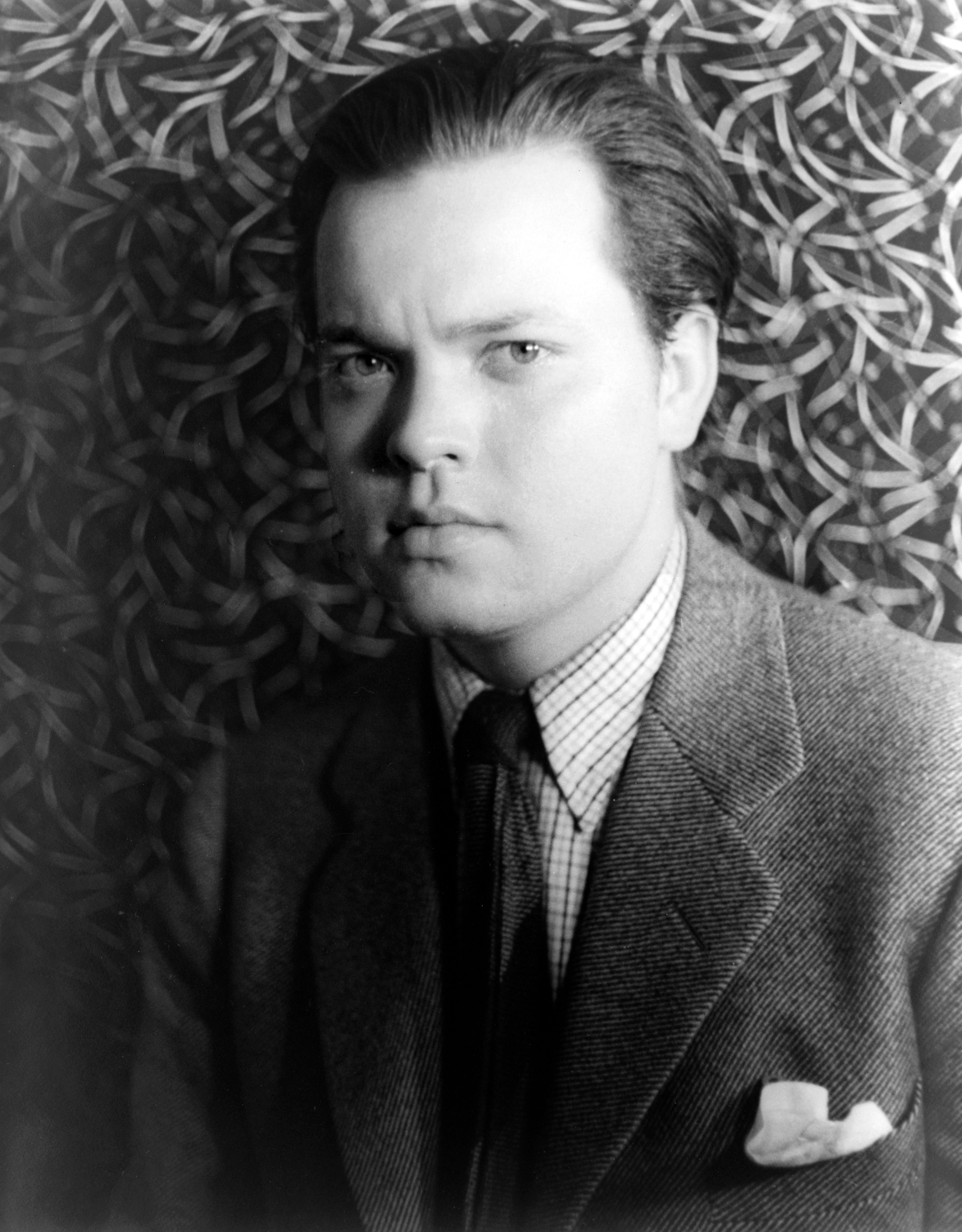
American Orson Welles was one of the six inaugural recipients of the Fellowship in 1983.

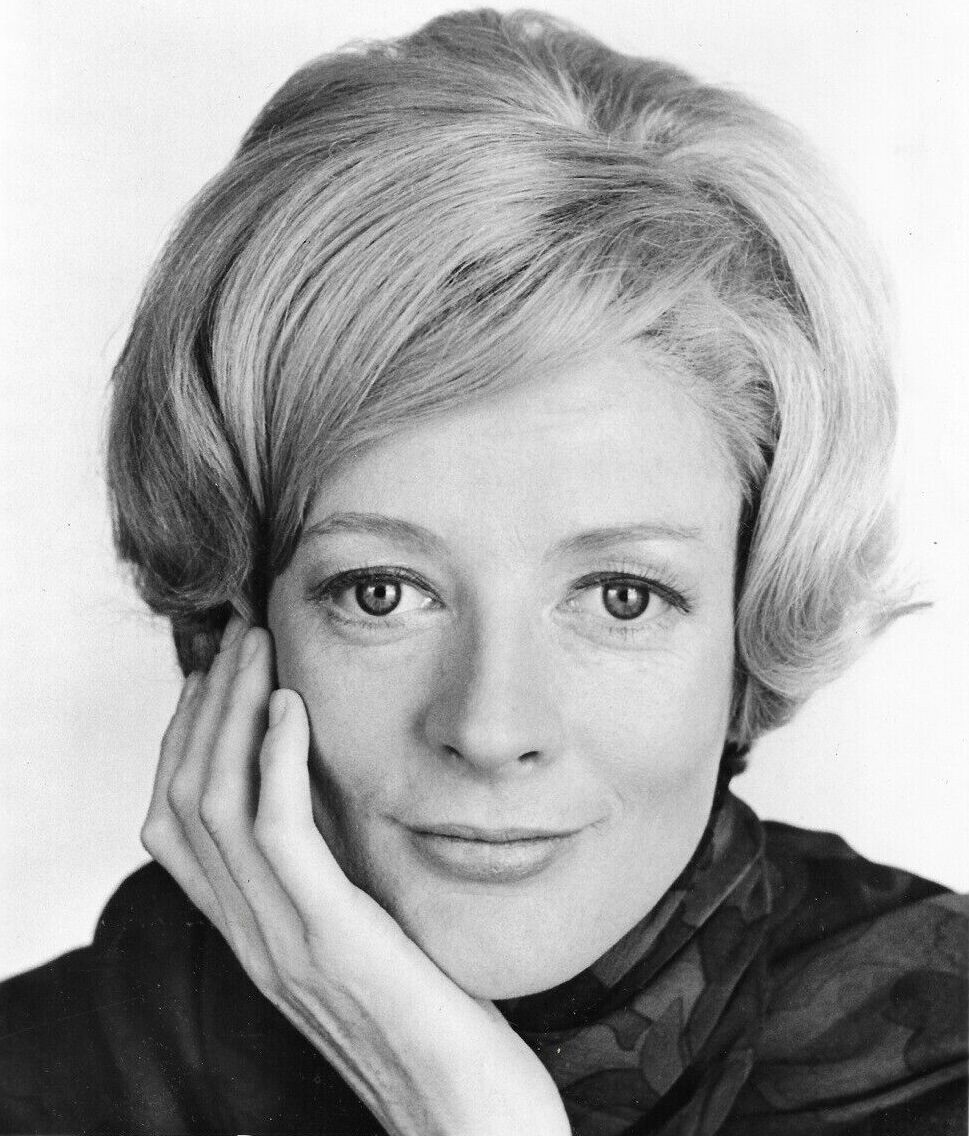
Maggie Smith received the Fellowship in 1992

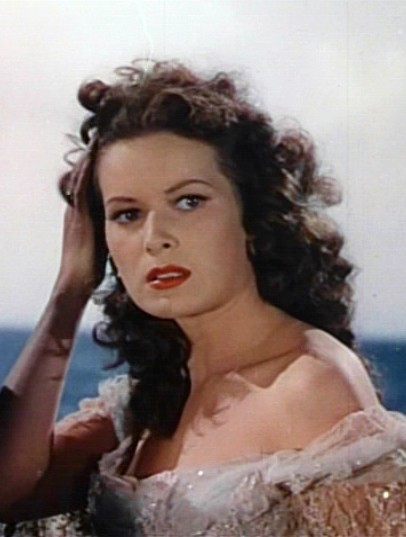
Irish actress Maureen O'Hara was awarded the Fellowship in 1993.

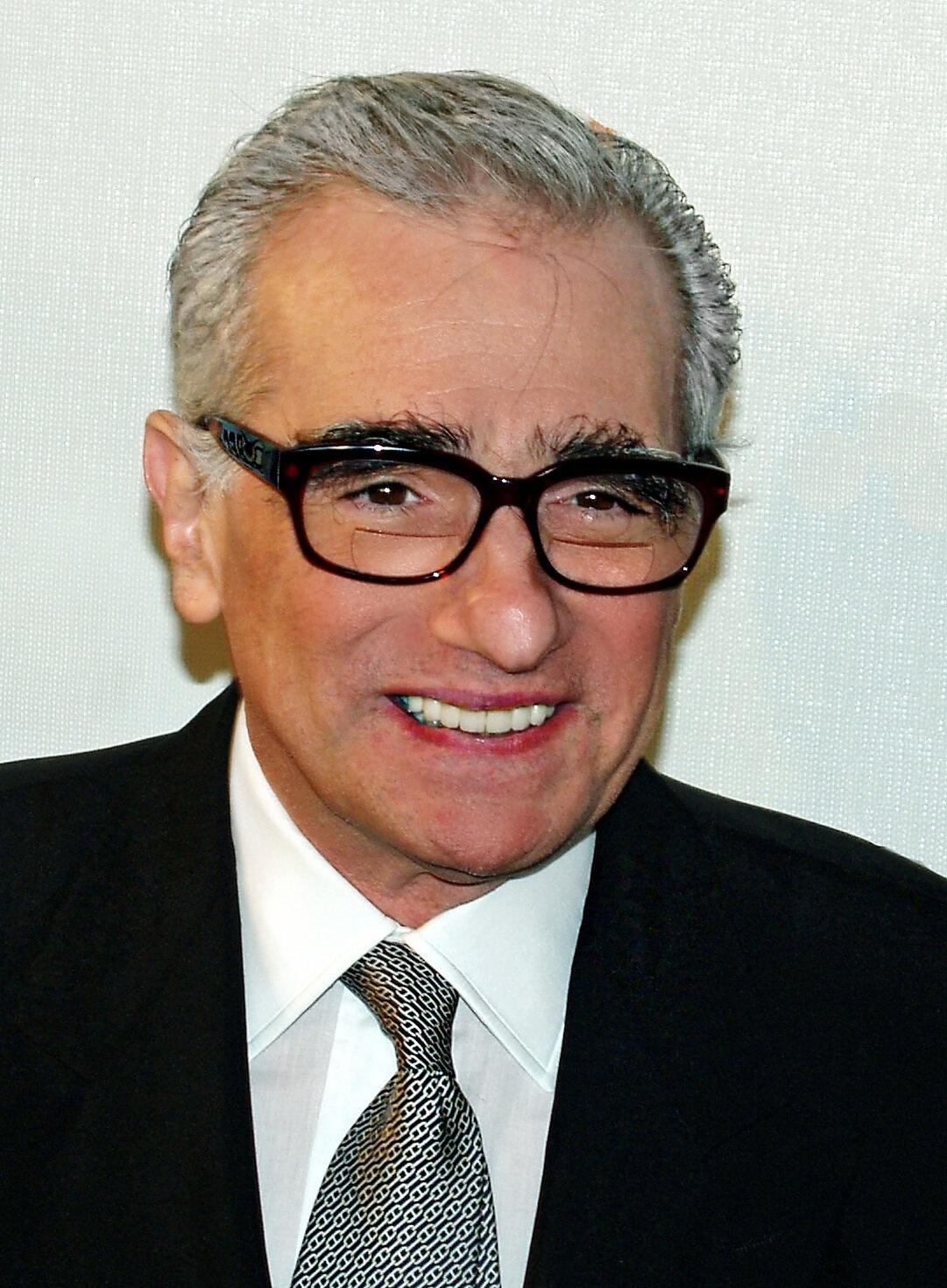
Martin Scorsese became a BFI Fellow in 1995.

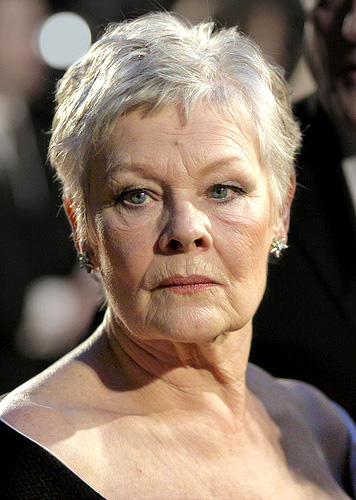
Judi Dench became a Fellow in 2011

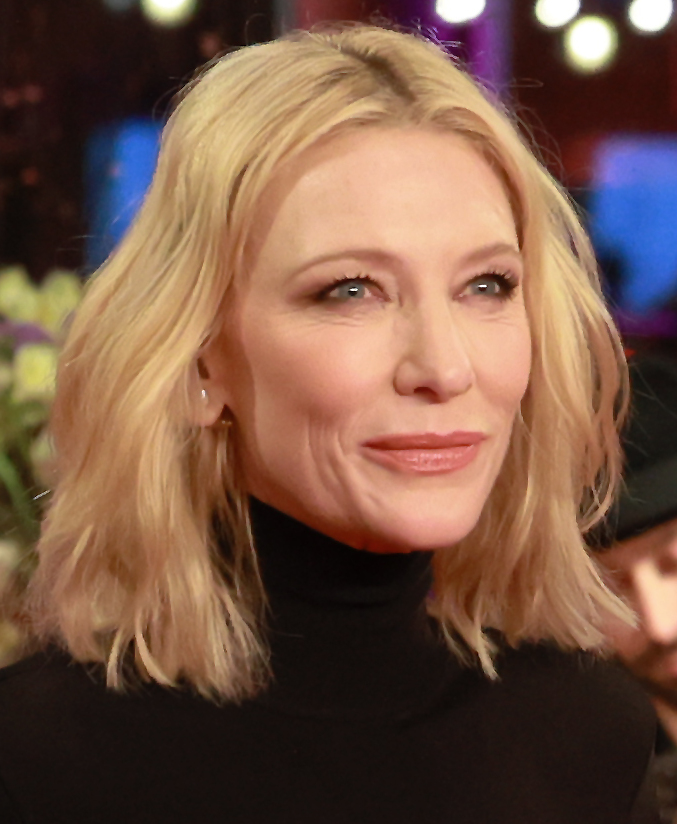
Cate Blanchett was a 2015 recipient of the Fellowship.

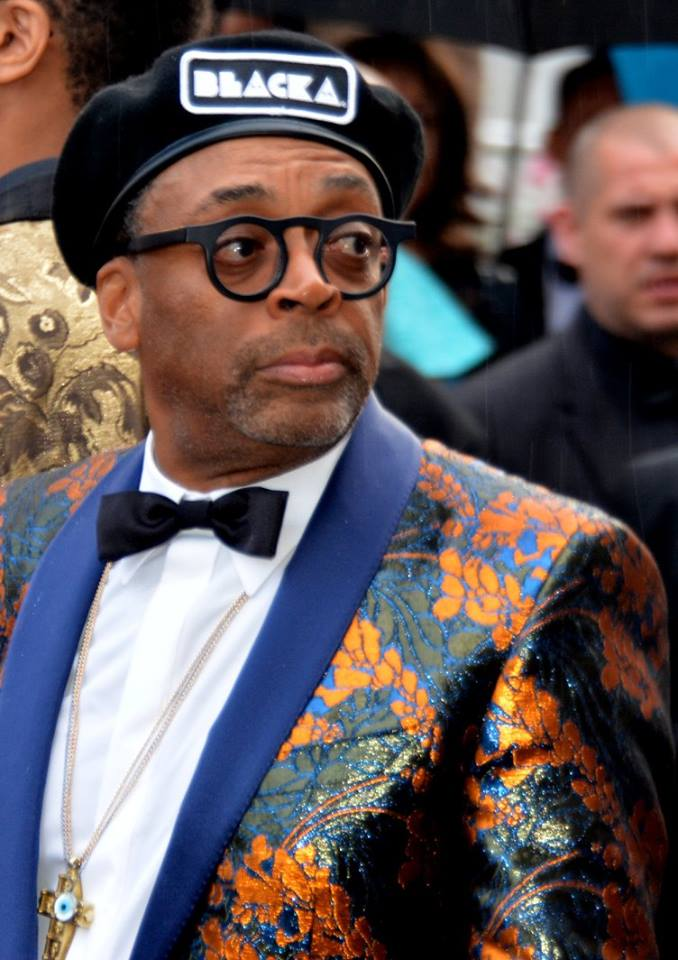
Spike Lee was a 2023 recipient of the Fellowship

Year	Recipient	Occupation	Nationality	Ref
1983	Marcel Carné	Director	France	
1983	David Lean	Director / Producer / Writer	United Kingdom	
1983	Michael Powell	Director / Producer / Writer	United Kingdom	
1983	Emeric Pressburger	Director / Producer / Writer	Hungary	
1983	Satyajit Ray	Director / Writer	India	
1983	Orson Welles	Director / Actor / Writer	United States	
1984	Sidney Bernstein	Media executive	United Kingdom	
1985	John Brabourne	Film and Television Producer	United Kingdom	
1985	Laurence Olivier	Actor / Director	United Kingdom	
1986	Jeremy Isaacs	Television Producer	United Kingdom	
1986	Deborah Kerr	Actress	United Kingdom	
1986	Akira Kurosawa	Director	Japan	
1986	Dilys Powell	Film Critic	United Kingdom	
1987	Dirk Bogarde	Actor / Screenwriter / Novelist	United Kingdom	
1987	Bette Davis	Actress	United States	
1987	Elem Klimov	Filmmaker	Soviet Union	
1988	Graham Greene	Writer	United Kingdom	
1988	Vanessa Redgrave	Actress	United Kingdom	
1988	Anthony Smith	Producer	United Kingdom	
1989	Peggy Ashcroft	Actress	United Kingdom	
1989	Gérard Depardieu	Actor	France	
1989	David Francis	Film Archivist	United Kingdom	
1990	Derek Jarman	Filmmaker	United Kingdom	
1990	Krzysztof Kieślowski	Filmmaker	Poland	
1990	Jeanne Moreau	Actress	France	
1990	Fred Zinnemann	Director	Austria	
1991	Alec Guinness	Actor	United Kingdom	
1991	Leslie Hardcastle	Art Administrator	United Kingdom	
1992	Richard Attenborough	Director / Actor	United Kingdom	
1992	Maggie Smith	Actress	United Kingdom	
1993	Clint Eastwood	Filmmaker / Actor	United States	
1993	Denis Forman	Television Executive	United Kingdom	
1993	Maureen O'Hara	Actress	Ireland	
1994	Nicolas Roeg	Director / Cinematographer	United Kingdom	
1994	Jean Simmons	Actress	United Kingdom	
1995	Michelangelo Antonioni	Filmmaker	Italy	
1995	John Mills	Actor	United Kingdom	
1995	Martin Scorsese	Filmmaker	United States	
1995	Robert Wise	Director / Producer / Writer	United States	
1996	Michael Caine	Actor	United Kingdom	
1996	Ken Loach	Filmmaker	United Kingdom	
1997	Michael Parkinson	Television Presenter	United Kingdom	
1997	Lynda La Plante	Screenwriter / Actress	United Kingdom	
1997	Verity Lambert	Television Producer	United Kingdom	
1997	David Puttnam	Film Producer / Activist	United Kingdom	
1997	Sydney Samuelson	Director / Cinematographer	United Kingdom	
1997	Thelma Schoonmaker	Film Editor	United States	
1997	Alan Yentob	Television Presenter / Producer	United Kingdom	
1998	Bernardo Bertolucci	Filmmaker	Italy	
1998	Jeremy Thomas	Producer	United Kingdom	
1999	John Paul Getty, Jr.	Philanthropist	United States	
2000	Elizabeth Taylor	Actress	United Kingdom	
2001	Robert Altman	Filmmaker	United States	
2001	Lewis Gilbert	Filmmaker	United Kingdom	
2002	Jack Cardiff	Cinematographer	United Kingdom	
2002	Bob Weinstein	Film Producer	United States	
2005	Abbas Kiarostami	Filmmaker	Iran	
2005	Mike Leigh	Filmmaker	United Kingdom	
2005	Ousmane Sembène	Filmmaker	Senegal	
2007	Terence Davies	Filmmaker	United Kingdom	
2009	Souleymane Cissé	Director	Mali	
2009	John Hurt	Actor	United Kingdom	
2009	Ridley Scott	Director	United Kingdom	
2010	Danny Boyle	Director	United Kingdom	
2010	David Rose	Producer	United Kingdom	
2011	Isabelle Huppert	Actress	France	
2011	Judi Dench	Actress	United Kingdom	
2011	Ralph Fiennes	Actor / Director	United Kingdom	
2011	David Cronenberg	Director	Canada	
2012	Bryan Forbes	Filmmaker	United Kingdom	
2012	Helena Bonham Carter	Actress	United Kingdom	
2012	Tim Burton	Director	United States	
2012	Richard Lester	Director	United Kingdom	
2013	Philip French	Film Critic	United Kingdom	
2013	Christopher Lee	Actor	United Kingdom	
2013	John Boorman	Director	United Kingdom	
2014	Al Pacino	Actor	United States	
2014	Stephen Frears	Director	United Kingdom	
2015	Mel Brooks	Filmmaker / Actor / Comedian	United States	
2015	Cate Blanchett	Actress	Australia	
2016	Hugh Grant	Actor	United Kingdom	
2016	Greg Dyke	Media Executive	United Kingdom	
2016	Steve McQueen	Filmmaker	United Kingdom	
2017	Peter Morgan	Screenwriter / Playwright	United Kingdom	
2017	Paul Greengrass	Director	United Kingdom	
2019	Olivia Colman	Actor	United Kingdom	
2020	Tilda Swinton	Actress	United Kingdom	
2020	Amanda Nevill	Chief Administrator of BFI	United Kingdom	
2022	Michael G. Wilson	Film Producer of James Bond	United Kingdom	
2022	Barbara Broccoli	Film Producer of James Bond	United Kingdom; United States	
2023	Spike Lee	Filmmaker	United States	
2024	Christopher Nolan	Filmmaker	United Kingdom	
2025	Tom Cruise	Actor / Producer	United States	
2025	Laura Mulvey	Film theorist / Filmmaker	United Kingdom	
2026	Guillermo del Toro	Filmmaker	Mexico	
