= Amenity society =

English and Welsh conservation society

In England and Wales, an amenity society is an organisation which monitors planning and development.

== National societies ==
National amenity societies preserve historic art and architecture and operate at a national level. In England, the six principal societies, known formally as the National Amenity Societies, are statutory consultees on alterations to listed buildings, and by law must be notified of any work to a listed building which involves any element of demolition. These societies are:

- The Society for the Protection of Ancient Buildings
- The Ancient Monuments Society, since 2021 operating under the working name Historic Buildings & Places
- The Council for British Archaeology
- The Georgian Group, concerned with buildings and planned landscapes dating from between 1700 and 1840
- The Victorian Society, concerned with buildings built from 1837 to 1914 (also covering Edwardian architecture)
- The Twentieth Century Society, concerned with buildings dating from 1914 onwards

The six societies meet several times a year as the Joint Committee of the National Amenity Societies. A database of their casework is provided by the Council for British Archaeology on behalf of the committee.

In addition to the above, the Garden History Society is a statutory consultee in relation to planning proposals likely to affect registered historic parks and gardens.

Details of the arrangements for handling heritage-related applications are laid out from time to time by the relevant Secretary of State, most recently by the Ministry of Housing, Communities & Local Government in 2021.

== Local amenity societies ==
Many civic societies in England and Wales comment non-statutorily on planning and historic building matters within their localities, or within a particular conservation area. Some are formally recognised by the local planning authority; for example, Westminster City Council maintains a list of recognised consultees which includes the Soho Society and other residents' associations. Some also operate as preservation trusts; for example, Wisbech Society is recognised by Fenland District Council as a planning consultee.

== See also ==
Bodies in Scotland with similar roles:

- Architectural Heritage Society of Scotland
- Scottish Civic Trust
