= Leslie Hardcastle =

British theatre manager (1926–2023)

Jesse Leslie Hardcastle OBE (8 December 1926 – 14 March 2023) was a British arts administrator who was controller of the British Film Institute's (BFI) National Film Theatre (NFT) complex on London's South Bank from its early beginnings through to his retirement in the mid 1990s.

Hardcastle was born in Croydon. After service in the Royal Navy, he worked his way through the ranks of the BFI and led the NFT through its pioneering days including the founding of the London Film Festival (LFF) in 1957, the setting up of a second onsite screen (NFT2), along with a restaurant. His annual controller's lunch at LFF was a highlight of the festival.

In the 1980s, Hardcastle together with David Francis of the National Film Archive led the development of the Museum of the Moving Image (MOMI), also on the South Bank. The museum opened in 1988 and received numerous awards.

Hardcastle was appointed an Officer of the Order of the British Empire (OBE) in the 1974 Birthday Honours. In addition, he was a fellow of the BFI, an honorary fellow of the BKSTS, and received a BAFTA for the creation of MOMI.

After retiring as controller of the South Bank complex (NFT and MOMI), he was retained as curator to MOMI, instigating many innovative temporary exhibitions and overlaying the original museum with "The Little People's Exhibition" – a linear display for very small children. MOMI closed to the public in 1999.

Having retired completely from the BFI Southbank, Hardcastle became a consultant and eventually a governor of the British Film Institute. He remained active in film-related projects, including The Projected Picture Trust, Worthing Dome and Regeneration Trust, and Uckfield Film Society. He was awarded the Charles Roebuck Cup for outstanding individual contribution to the film society movement in 2007.

Hardcastle spoke extensively of the Golden Age of cinema and his early days at the BFI in interviews given to journalist and researcher Abigail Deveney, who was conducting film studies investigations as part of MA studies at SOAS in London.

Living in Soho for most of his life, Hardcastle was a board and founder member of the Soho Housing Association, which provides social housing in central London. He was also a vice president of The Soho Society.

Hardcastle was married with two sons and three grandchildren. He died on 14 March 2023, at the age of 96.
