= The Soho Society =

Community association

Coordinates: 51.5124°N 0.1318°W

- Formation: 1970; 56 years ago
- Type: Amenity society
- Registration no.: Charity 1146589; Company 07899282
- Legal status: Active
- Headquarters: Tower of St Anne's Church, Soho
- Patron: Martha Lane Fox
- Honorary President: Leslie Hardcastle
- Chair: Tim Lord
- Secessions: Museum of Soho; Soho Housing Association; Soho Neighbourhood Forum
- Budget: £23.8K (2018)
- Revenue: £31.8K (2018)
- Volunteers: 20 (2018)
- Website: sohosociety.org.uk

The Soho Society is a community association for the London district of Soho.

== History ==
It was founded in 1972 in response to buildings being converted to offices. It campaigned against the domination of the area by sex shops and was successful in gaining the status of conservation area for the district. In 1978, it supported independent candidates for Westminster City Council to challenge the Conservative Party's control of the council, as they were thought to be encouraging and exploiting the sex industry.

The society is a registered charity and a recognised amenity society for the City of Westminster. In 1976, it established the Soho Housing Association to manage 400 flats for residents of the area.

In May 2026 its members voted to lobby against all new licensing applications, including renewals, that came before Westminster Council: the move led to criticism from the area's business community and Mayor of London Sadiq Khan.
