= Kent Museum of the Moving Image =

Coordinates: 51.22421°N 1.40058°E

The Kent Museum of the Moving Image opened in Deal, Kent in April 2018. The museum was created by David Francis, with his wife Jocelyn Marsh (daughter of award-winning production designer Terence Marsh). Francis was one of the lead members who created the Museum of the Moving Image in London.

The 'Kent MOMI' stands at the top of Stanhope Road in Deal, on the site of a disused care home and opposite the town's main entertainment venue, the Astor Theatre.

== Exhibitions ==
The museum currently hosts three exhibitions, none of which is permanent. 35,000 Years to Catch a Shadow: A Reflective Exhibition, challenges visitors to explore the Phenomenon, Arts, and Technologies of the Shadow; Passport to Ealing: The Films and Their Posters, 1938–1958, is a major retrospective of a unique moment in cinema history; and an exhibition of vintage and historic Vinten cameras and equipment, made possible by the Vinten family.

A previous, inaugural exhibition provided a colourful review of The Royal Polytechnic Institution and Multi-Media Victorian London.

== See also ==
- Museum of the Moving Image
