= Deal Town Hall =

Municipal building in Deal, Kent, England

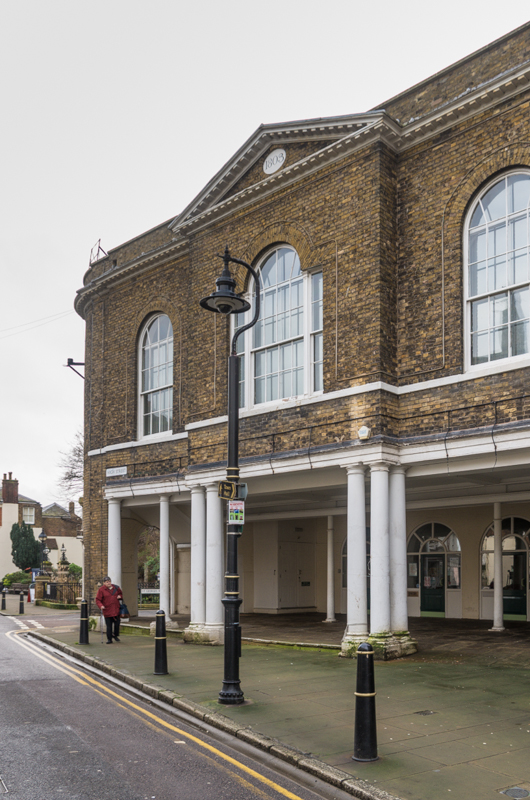
- Deal Town Hall

- Shown in Kent
- 51.2258°N 1.4025°E
- Location: High Street, Deal

History
- Built: 1804

Site notes
- Architect: John Mathews
- Architectural style: Neoclassical style

Listed Building – Grade II
- Official name: Town Hall
- Designated: 8 February 1974
- Reference no.: 1363477

Deal Town Hall is a municipal building in the High Street in Deal, Kent, England. The town hall, which was the headquarters of Deal Borough Council, is a Grade II listed building.

== History ==
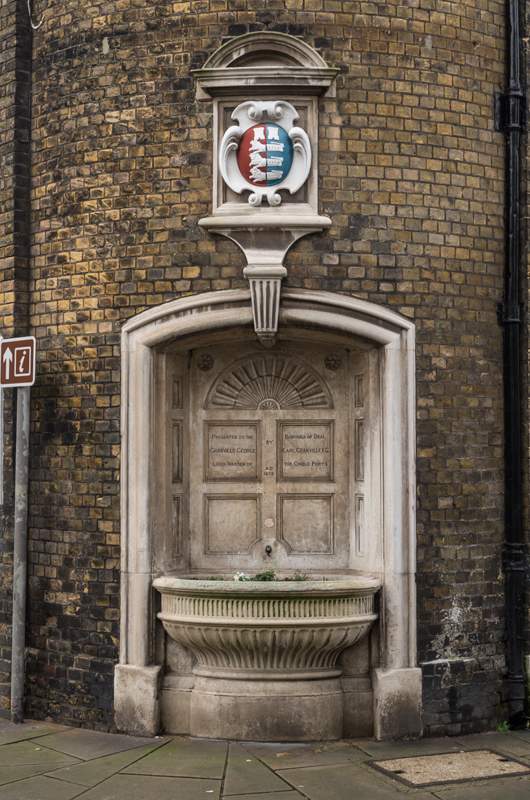
The drinking fountain

Following the grant of a royal charter from William III giving the town the right to incorporate as an independent borough in 1699, the new council initially rented a private house in Whetstone Street (now known as King Street) for their meetings, before erecting a dedicated "Court Hall" on the east side of the High Street, between Market Street and King Street, in the early 18th century. In the early 19th century, after finding the old court hall was inadequate for their requirements, civic leaders decided to commission a new building: the site they selected on the west side of the High Street was acquired from a private individual, William Wilds.

The foundation stone for the new building was laid by the mayor, Isaac Gammon, on 15 March 1803. It was designed by John Mathews in the neoclassical style, built in yellow brick with stone dressings at a cost of £2,961 and was completed in autumn 1804. The design involved a near-symmetrical main frontage with three bays facing onto the High Street with the central bay slighted projected forward; the ground floor was arcaded to allow markets to be held while the first floor was supported by Tuscan order columns and featured a Venetian window in the central bay with tall round headed windows in the other bays. At roof level, there was a modillioned cornice and a pediment with a date stone in the tympanum. Internally, the principal rooms were the council chamber on the first floor, which was accessed by a spiral staircase and was oak panelled, and the mayor's parlour, which was on the ground floor.

A drinking fountain, commissioned by the then Lord Warden of the Cinque Ports, Earl Granville, was installed on the corner with St George's Road in 1875. During the First World War, the town hall was the venue for a meeting to organise accommodation for some 1,500 Belgian refugees seeking homes in the local area. In 1938, there was a fire in the council chamber which caused serious damage to some items on display and left a model of a Deal lugger completely destroyed.

The town hall continued to serve as the headquarters of Deal Borough Council for much of the 20th century but ceased to be the local seat of government when the enlarged Dover District Council was formed in 1974. After court services transferred to Dover in the late 1970s, the town hall also ceased to be used for judicial purposes. The town hall subsequently became the meeting place for Deal Town Council as well as an approved venue for weddings and civil partnership ceremonies.

Works of art in the town hall include a portrait of William III by Willem Wissing, a portrait of William IV by Francis Grant and a portrait of Sir Winston Churchill by Francis Ramsay. Other items include a portrait of the local writer, Elizabeth Carter, by Joseph Highmore and a painting entitled Deal in a Storm by J. M. W. Turner.
