= Channel Four/MOMI animator in residence =

The Channel Four/MOMI animator in residence scheme was housed in the MOMI on the South Bank. Starting in 1990. It ran for thirteen years commissioning over forty films which were transmitted throughout the World. The scheme was the brainchild of Channel Four Television Corporation commissioning editor for animation, Clare Kitson.

Funded by Channel Four, it ran a competition in which graduates came up with storylines and concepts for films of which four would be developed into a full Channel Four commission. The winners had to work in full view of the public in the 'goldfish bowl', a three-meter (10') square glass box in the heart of the MOMI.

The scheme's first production advisor/producer was Lisa Beattie. She oversaw the productions from 1992 to 1999. After her departure was replaced by Chris Shepherd who took on the role starting 1999 till the scheme moved to the National Media Museum in 2004.

Notable directors to have completed the scheme included Stephen Harding-Hill, Anthony Hodgson, Leigh Hodgkinson, Lizzie Oxby, Ruth Lingford, Chris Shepherd, Brian Wood.

== Films ==
=== 1992 ===
- Big Cheese by Sam Fell
- The Mill by Petra Freeman
- Never Say Pink Fury Die by Louise Spraggon
- Prayer to Viracocha by Marie Cecille Pattison

=== 1993 ===
- Chicken Wire by Sara Roper
- Angry George Irons by Steven Harding Hill
- Not Without My Handbag by Boris Kossmehl
- Mama Lou by Maybelle Peters

=== 1994 ===
- Growing by Alison Hemstock
- Fairest Of Them All by Jason Stalman
- El Caminante by Debra Smith
- Ice Cream And Jelly And A Punch In The Belly by Suzanne Cohen & Lesley Bushell

=== 1995 ===
- The Broken Jaw by Chris Shepherd
- Touch Wood by Vivienne Jones
- Final Communique by Gail Thomas
- Angel by Colin Waddell

=== 1996 ===
- Death And The Mother by Ruth Lingford
- Glasgow Kiss by SAm Moore
- Combination Skin by Anthony Hodson
- Dead Cow Farm by John Parry

=== 1997 ===
- Deviant! by Eoin Clarke
- School Disco by Brian Wood
- Andares In Time Of War by Alejandra J. Lopez
- Naja Goes To School by Shilpa Ranade

=== 1998 ===
- Cri by Thorsten Rienth
- Toby The Square Boy by Gary Hawkins
- Beelines by Rachel Bevan Baker
- Akbar's Cheetah by Iain Gardner
