= Listed buildings in Deal, Kent =

Historic structures in Kent, England

Deal is a town and civil parish in the Dover District of Kent, England. It contains four grade II*, 332 grade II listed buildings that are recorded in the National Heritage List for England.

This list is based on the information retrieved online from Historic England

== Key ==
| Grade | Criteria |
|---|---|
| I | Buildings that are of exceptional interest |
| II* | Particularly important buildings of more than special interest |
| II | Buildings that are of special interest |

== Listing ==
| Name | Grade | Location | Type | Completed (Note: The date given is the date used by Historic England as significant for the initial building or that of an important part in the structure's description.) | Date designated | Grid ref. (Note: The grid reference is based on the British national grid reference system, sometimes known as OSGB36, used by the Ordnance Survey.) Geo-coordinates | Notes | Entry number (Note: The "List Entry Number" is a unique number assigned to each listed building and scheduled monument by Historic England.) | Image | Wikidata |
|---|---|---|---|---|---|---|---|---|---|---|
| K6 Telephone Kiosk | II | Alfred Square | | | 11 May 1989 | TR3766653270; 51°13′45″N 1°24′10″E | | 1254065 | Upload Photo | Q26681707 |
| 3, Alfred Square | II | 3, Alfred Square | | | 8 February 1974 | TR3766653289; 51°13′45″N 1°24′10″E | | 1069900 | Upload Photo | Q26323303 |
| 4, Alfred Square | II | 4, Alfred Square | | | 8 February 1974 | TR3766953290; 51°13′45″N 1°24′10″E | | 1363443 | Upload Photo | Q26645269 |
| 5 and 6, Alfred Square | II | 5 and 6, Alfred Square | | | 8 February 1974 | TR3767653290; 51°13′45″N 1°24′11″E | | 1069901 | Upload Photo | Q26323305 |
| 7 and 8, Alfred Square | II | 7 and 8, Alfred Square | | | 8 February 1974 | TR3768453291; 51°13′45″N 1°24′11″E | | 1069902 | Upload Photo | Q26323307 |
| 8a and 8b, Alfred Square | II | 8a and 8b, Alfred Square | | | 8 February 1974 | TR3769753289; 51°13′45″N 1°24′12″E | | 1069903 | Upload Photo | Q26323309 |
| 9 and 10, Alfred Square | II | 9 and 10, Alfred Square | | | 8 February 1974 | TR3768653259; 51°13′44″N 1°24′11″E | | 1250298 | Upload Photo | Q26542354 |
| 11, Alfred Square | II | 11, Alfred Square | | | 8 February 1974 | TR3767853252; 51°13′44″N 1°24′11″E | | 1069904 | Upload Photo | Q26323311 |
| 12, Alfred Square | II | 12, Alfred Square | | | 8 February 1974 | TR3767353253; 51°13′44″N 1°24′10″E | | 1069905 | Upload Photo | Q26323313 |
| 13, Alfred Square | II | 13, Alfred Square | | | 8 February 1974 | TR3766653252; 51°13′44″N 1°24′10″E | | 1250301 | Upload Photo | Q26542357 |
| K6 Telephone Kiosk | II | Beach Street | | | 11 May 1989 | TR3781252617; 51°13′23″N 1°24′16″E | | 1069756 | Upload Photo | Q26323026 |
| Royal Hotel | II | Beach Street | | | 8 February 1974 | TR3779252869; 51°13′32″N 1°24′15″E | | 1363438 | Upload Photo | Q26645264 |
| 1, Beach Street | II | 1, Beach Street | | | 8 February 1974 | TR3779252524; 51°13′20″N 1°24′15″E | | 1069908 | Upload Photo | Q26323319 |
| 3, Beach Street | II | 3, Beach Street | | | 8 February 1974 | TR3779652530; 51°13′21″N 1°24′15″E | | 1250311 | Upload Photo | Q26542367 |
| Nelson Cottage | II | 5, Beach Street | | | 8 February 1974 | TR3779552536; 51°13′21″N 1°24′15″E | | 1363444 | Upload Photo | Q26645270 |
| 7, Beach Street | II | 7, Beach Street | | | 8 February 1974 | TR3778952545; 51°13′21″N 1°24′15″E | | 1263337 | Upload Photo | Q26554132 |
| King's Head Public House | II | 9, Beach Street | | | 8 February 1974 | TR3778752554; 51°13′21″N 1°24′14″E | | 1069909 | Upload Photo | Q26323321 |
| 11 and 13, Beach Street | II | 11 and 13, Beach Street | | | 8 February 1974 | TR3778852558; 51°13′22″N 1°24′15″E | | 1069910 | Upload Photo | Q26323323 |
| Killowen | II | 15, Beach Street | | | 8 February 1974 | TR3778352573; 51°13′22″N 1°24′14″E | | 1250316 | Upload Photo | Q26542372 |
| 17, Beach Street | II | 17, Beach Street | | | 8 February 1974 | TR3779052581; 51°13′22″N 1°24′15″E | | 1363406 | Upload Photo | Q26645233 |
| 19, Beach Street | II | 19, Beach Street | | | 8 February 1974 | TR3778252589; 51°13′23″N 1°24′14″E | | 1069911 | Upload Photo | Q26323324 |
| Beachbrow Private Hotel | II | 29, Beach Street | | | 1 June 1949 | TR3779552642; 51°13′24″N 1°24′15″E | | 1250325 | Upload Photo | Q26542381 |
| 31, Beach Street | II | 31, Beach Street | | | 8 February 1974 | TR3779952647; 51°13′24″N 1°24′15″E | | 1363407 | Upload Photo | Q26645234 |
| 49, Beach Street | II | 49, Beach Street | | | 8 February 1974 | TR3778752700; 51°13′26″N 1°24′15″E | | 1263303 | Upload Photo | Q26554099 |
| Clarendon Hotel | II | 51 and 55, Beach Street | | | 8 February 1974 | TR3778252714; 51°13′27″N 1°24′15″E | | 1069912 | Upload Photo | Q26323326 |
| 59, Beach Street | II | 59, Beach Street | | | 1 June 1949 | TR3778652741; 51°13′27″N 1°24′15″E | | 1069913 | Upload Photo | Q26323329 |
| 61, Beach Street | II | 61, Beach Street | | | 8 February 1974 | TR3778452746; 51°13′28″N 1°24′15″E | | 1263308 | Upload Photo | Q26554104 |
| 63, Beach Street | II | 63, Beach Street | | | 8 February 1974 | TR3778452751; 51°13′28″N 1°24′15″E | | 1363408 | Upload Photo | Q26645235 |
| 65, 65a and 67, Beach Street | II | 65, 65a and 67, Beach Street | | | 8 February 1974 | TR3777552757; 51°13′28″N 1°24′14″E | | 1250349 | Upload Photo | Q26542403 |
| 69, Beach Street | II | 69, Beach Street | | | 8 February 1974 | TR3777652770; 51°13′28″N 1°24′14″E | | 1069914 | Upload Photo | Q26323330 |
| 73, Beach Street | II | 73, Beach Street | | | 8 February 1974 | TR3777852802; 51°13′29″N 1°24′15″E | | 1363409 | Upload Photo | Q26645236 |
| Tudor Cottage | II | 75, Beach Street | | | 8 February 1974 | TR3777752807; 51°13′30″N 1°24′15″E | | 1250352 | Upload Photo | Q26542406 |
| Rose and Crown Public House | II | 77 and 79, Beach Street | | | 8 February 1974 | TR3777152810; 51°13′30″N 1°24′14″E | | 1069915 | Upload Photo | Q26323332 |
| 81, Beach Street | II | 81, Beach Street | | | 8 February 1974 | TR3777552825; 51°13′30″N 1°24′14″E | | 1363410 | Upload Photo | Q26645237 |
| 83, Beach Street | II | 83, Beach Street | | | 8 February 1974 | TR3777552832; 51°13′30″N 1°24′15″E | | 1263285 | Upload Photo | Q26554081 |
| The Golden Hind Tea Shop | II | 85, Beach Street | | | 1 June 1949 | TR3776652834; 51°13′31″N 1°24′14″E | | 1069916 | Upload Photo | Q26323334 |
| Magpie Cottage | II | 87, Beach Street | | | 8 February 1974 | TR3776852842; 51°13′31″N 1°24′14″E | | 1250373 | Upload Photo | Q26542424 |
| Star and Garter Hotel | II | 101, Beach Street | | | 8 February 1974 | TR3777052908; 51°13′33″N 1°24′14″E | | 1069917 | Upload Photo | Q26323336 |
| Stanford House | II | 105, Beach Street | | | 8 February 1974 | TR3777252918; 51°13′33″N 1°24′15″E | | 1363411 | Upload Photo | Q26645238 |
| White Horses | II | 107, Beach Street | | | 8 February 1974 | TR3777052928; 51°13′34″N 1°24′14″E | | 1250376 | Upload Photo | Q26542426 |
| 109, Beach Street | II | 109, Beach Street | | | 8 February 1974 | TR3776452936; 51°13′34″N 1°24′14″E | | 1069918 | Upload Photo | Q26323338 |
| 111, Beach Street | II | 111, Beach Street | | | 8 February 1974 | TR3777452942; 51°13′34″N 1°24′15″E | | 1363429 | Upload Photo | Q26645255 |
| 113, Beach Street | II | 113, Beach Street | | | 8 February 1974 | TR3777352945; 51°13′34″N 1°24′15″E | | 1069875 | Upload Photo | Q26323252 |
| St Elmo | II | 115, Beach Street | | | 8 February 1974 | TR3777552950; 51°13′34″N 1°24′15″E | | 1069876 | Upload Photo | Q26323254 |
| 117, Beach Street | II | 117, Beach Street | | | 8 February 1974 | TR3777252953; 51°13′34″N 1°24′15″E | | 1363430 | Upload Photo | Q26645256 |
| Adelaide House | II | 119 and 121, Beach Street | | | 1 June 1949 | TR3777552976; 51°13′35″N 1°24′15″E | | 1069877 | Upload Photo | Q26323256 |
| 123, Beach Street | II | 123, Beach Street | | | 8 February 1974 | TR3777752982; 51°13′35″N 1°24′15″E | | 1363431 | Upload Photo | Q26645257 |
| 125, Beach Street | II | 125, Beach Street | | | 8 February 1974 | TR3778052988; 51°13′35″N 1°24′15″E | | 1069878 | Upload Photo | Q26323258 |
| 127, Beach Street | II | 127, Beach Street | | | 8 February 1974 | TR3778152991; 51°13′36″N 1°24′15″E | | 1363432 | Upload Photo | Q26645258 |
| The Three Compasses Public House | II | 129, Beach Street | | | 8 February 1974 | TR3777453006; 51°13′36″N 1°24′15″E | | 1069879 | Upload Photo | Q26323260 |
| Bruce House | II | 131 and 133, Beach Street | | | 8 February 1974 | TR3777653014; 51°13′36″N 1°24′15″E | | 1069880 | Upload Photo | Q26323262 |
| 135, Beach Street | II | 135, Beach Street | | | 8 February 1974 | TR3777753027; 51°13′37″N 1°24′15″E | | 1069881 | Upload Photo | Q26323264 |
| Fairhaven | II | 137, Beach Street | | | 8 February 1974 | TR3777453033; 51°13′37″N 1°24′15″E | | 1069882 | Upload Photo | Q26323266 |
| Ye Cottage | II | 141, Beach Street | | | 8 February 1974 | TR3777553051; 51°13′38″N 1°24′15″E | | 1069883 | Upload Photo | Q26323268 |
| 143, Beach Street | II | 143, Beach Street | | | 8 February 1974 | TR3777453056; 51°13′38″N 1°24′15″E | | 1250713 | Upload Photo | Q26542745 |
| 145, Beach Street | II | 145, Beach Street | | | 8 February 1974 | TR3777553068; 51°13′38″N 1°24′15″E | | 1069884 | Upload Photo | Q26323270 |
| Central House | II | 147, Beach Street | | | 8 February 1974 | TR3777153078; 51°13′38″N 1°24′15″E | | 1069885 | Upload Photo | Q26323273 |
| Beachcrest | II | 149, Beach Street | | | 8 February 1974 | TR3777053082; 51°13′39″N 1°24′15″E | | 1250716 | Upload Photo | Q26542748 |
| 151, Beach Street | II | 151, Beach Street | | | 8 February 1974 | TR3777453086; 51°13′39″N 1°24′15″E | | 1069886 | Upload Photo | Q26323275 |
| The Pelican | II | 153, Beach Street | | | 8 February 1974 | TR3777053092; 51°13′39″N 1°24′15″E | | 1363433 | Upload Photo | Q26645259 |
| 155, Beach Street | II | 155, Beach Street | | | 8 February 1974 | TR3777153098; 51°13′39″N 1°24′15″E | | 1250719 | Upload Photo | Q26542750 |
| Lorne House | II | 157, Beach Street | | | 8 February 1974 | TR3777253107; 51°13′39″N 1°24′15″E | | 1069887 | Upload Photo | Q26323277 |
| 159, Beach Street | II | 159, Beach Street | | | 8 February 1974 | TR3777653111; 51°13′39″N 1°24′15″E | | 1250721 | Upload Photo | Q26542752 |
| 161, Beach Street | II | 161, Beach Street | | | 8 February 1974 | TR3777153118; 51°13′40″N 1°24′15″E | | 1069888 | Upload Photo | Q26323279 |
| 165, Beach Street | II | 165, Beach Street | | | 8 February 1974 | TR3777353132; 51°13′40″N 1°24′15″E | | 1363434 | Upload Photo | Q26645260 |
| The Albion Inn | II | 167, Beach Street | | | 8 February 1974 | TR3777353147; 51°13′41″N 1°24′15″E | | 1250724 | Upload Photo | Q26542755 |
| 169, Beach Street | II | 169, Beach Street | | | 8 February 1974 | TR3777653152; 51°13′41″N 1°24′15″E | | 1069889 | Upload Photo | Q26323281 |
| The Deal Cutter | II | 171, Beach Street | | | 8 February 1974 | TR3777453156; 51°13′41″N 1°24′15″E | | 1263118 | Upload Photo | Q26553928 |
| 173, Beach Street | II | 173, Beach Street | | | 8 February 1974 | TR3777553160; 51°13′41″N 1°24′15″E | | 1363435 | Upload Photo | Q26645261 |
| Sandcastles | II | 175, Beach Street | | | 14 January 2009 | TR3777453165; 51°13′41″N 1°24′15″E | | 1393083 | Upload Photo | Q26672271 |
| Beach Cottage | II | 179, Beach Street | | | 8 February 1974 | TR3776853179; 51°13′42″N 1°24′15″E | | 1069890 | Upload Photo | Q26323283 |
| Royal Exchange | II | 183, Beach Street | | | 8 February 1974 | TR3777653232; 51°13′43″N 1°24′16″E | | 1250740 | Upload Photo | Q26542768 |
| 185, Beach Street | II | 185, Beach Street | | | 8 February 1974 | TR3777753240; 51°13′44″N 1°24′16″E | | 1363436 | Upload Photo | Q26645262 |
| 187, Beach Street | II | 187, Beach Street | | | 8 February 1974 | TR3777753245; 51°13′44″N 1°24′16″E | | 1069891 | Upload Photo | Q26323285 |
| 189, Beach Street | II | 189, Beach Street | | | 8 February 1974 | TR3777753250; 51°13′44″N 1°24′16″E | | 1263121 | Upload Photo | Q26553931 |
| 191, Beach Street | II | 191, Beach Street | | | 8 February 1974 | TR3777753257; 51°13′44″N 1°24′16″E | | 1069892 | Upload Photo | Q26323287 |
| Forres House | II | 193, Beach Street | | | 8 February 1974 | TR3777553265; 51°13′44″N 1°24′16″E | | 1250763 | Upload Photo | Q26542791 |
| 195 and 195a, Beach Street | II | 195 and 195a, Beach Street | | | 8 February 1974 | TR3777353281; 51°13′45″N 1°24′15″E | | 1363437 | Upload Photo | Q26645263 |
| Seamark House | II | 197, Beach Street | | | 8 February 1974 | TR3777153288; 51°13′45″N 1°24′15″E | | 1069893 | Upload Photo | Q26323289 |
| The Scarborough Cat | II | 199, Beach Street | | | 8 February 1974 | TR3777053291; 51°13′45″N 1°24′15″E | | 1263093 | Upload Photo | Q26553906 |
| 3, Blenheim Road | II | 3, Blenheim Road | | | 8 February 1974 | TR3749152524; 51°13′21″N 1°23′59″E | | 1251178 | Upload Photo | Q26543164 |
| 5, Blenheim Road | II | 5, Blenheim Road | | | 8 February 1974 | TR3748552508; 51°13′20″N 1°23′59″E | | 1069894 | Upload Photo | Q26323291 |
| 7, Blenheim Road | II | 7, Blenheim Road | | | 8 February 1974 | TR3748652497; 51°13′20″N 1°23′59″E | | 1069895 | Upload Photo | Q26323293 |
| 9 and 11, Blenheim Road | II | 9 and 11, Blenheim Road | | | 8 February 1974 | TR3748052490; 51°13′20″N 1°23′59″E | | 1262878 | Upload Photo | Q26553721 |
| 13, Blenheim Road | II | 13, Blenheim Road | | | 8 February 1974 | TR3747852484; 51°13′20″N 1°23′58″E | | 1363439 | Upload Photo | Q26645265 |
| 1, Brewer Street | II | 1, Brewer Street | | | 8 February 1974 | TR3773552946; 51°13′34″N 1°24′13″E | | 1069896 | Upload Photo | Q26323295 |
| 2, Brewer Street | II | 2, Brewer Street | | | 8 February 1974 | TR3774752952; 51°13′34″N 1°24′13″E | | 1262879 | Upload Photo | Q26553722 |
| 3, Brewer Street | II | 3, Brewer Street | | | 8 February 1974 | TR3775152955; 51°13′34″N 1°24′14″E | | 1363440 | Upload Photo | Q26645266 |
| 4, Brewer Street | II | 4, Brewer Street | | | 16 April 2003 | TR3775552958; 51°13′35″N 1°24′14″E | | 1408923 | Upload Photo | Q26676039 |
| The Limes | II | 6, Broad Street | | | 1 June 1949 | TR3774052596; 51°13′23″N 1°24′12″E | | 1069852 | Upload Photo | Q26323206 |
| 8, Broad Street | II | 8, Broad Street | | | 8 February 1974 | TR3775252595; 51°13′23″N 1°24′13″E | | 1363459 | Upload Photo | Q26645285 |
| 1 and 2, Chapel Street | II | 1 and 2, Chapel Street | | | 8 February 1974 | TR3773452868; 51°13′32″N 1°24′12″E | | 1069853 | Upload Photo | Q26323207 |
| 8-10, Chapel Street | II | 8-10, Chapel Street | | | 8 February 1974 | TR3774152844; 51°13′31″N 1°24′13″E | | 1069854 | Upload Photo | Q26323208 |
| Court Lodge | II | 132, Church Path | | | 1 June 1949 | TR3689452457; 51°13′20″N 1°23′28″E | | 1363461 | Upload Photo | Q26645287 |
| Bygrave House | II | 154, Church Path | | | 1 June 1949 | TR3675952310; 51°13′15″N 1°23′21″E | | 1069856 | Upload Photo | Q26323211 |
| The Cottage | II | 160, Church Path | | | 1 June 1949 | TR3671852290; 51°13′15″N 1°23′19″E | | 1363462 | Upload Photo | Q26645288 |
| Ivy Cottages | II | 234-238, Church Path | | | 8 February 1974 | TR3641052048; 51°13′07″N 1°23′02″E | | 1069857 | Upload Photo | Q26323213 |
| 1, College Road | II | 1, College Road | | | 1 June 1949 | TR3761553286; 51°13′45″N 1°24′07″E | | 1251220 | Upload Photo | Q26543203 |
| 5-9, College Road | II | 5-9, College Road | | | 8 February 1974 | TR3761353313; 51°13′46″N 1°24′07″E | | 1069863 | Upload Photo | Q26323226 |
| 11, College Road | II | 11, College Road | | | 8 February 1974 | TR3761053325; 51°13′47″N 1°24′07″E | | 1069864 | Upload Photo | Q26323228 |
| 13-19, College Road | II | 13-19, College Road | | | 8 February 1974 | TR3761253331; 51°13′47″N 1°24′07″E | | 1251222 | Upload Photo | Q26543205 |
| 21 and 23, College Road | II | 21 and 23, College Road | | | 8 February 1974 | TR3760853349; 51°13′47″N 1°24′07″E | | 1069865 | Upload Photo | Q26323230 |
| 1, Coppin Street | II | 1, Coppin Street | | | 8 February 1974 | TR3773552999; 51°13′36″N 1°24′13″E | | 1251487 | Upload Photo | Q26543443 |
| 5 and 6, Coppin Street | II | 5 and 6, Coppin Street | | | 8 February 1974 | TR3774553005; 51°13′36″N 1°24′13″E | | 1069866 | Upload Photo | Q26323232 |
| 7, Coppin Street | II | 7, Coppin Street | | | 8 February 1974 | TR3774953006; 51°13′36″N 1°24′14″E | | 1363463 | Upload Photo | Q26645289 |
| 8 and 9, Coppin Street | II | 8 and 9, Coppin Street | | | 8 February 1974 | TR3775653003; 51°13′36″N 1°24′14″E | | 1262758 | Upload Photo | Q26553613 |
| Coppin House | II | 10, Coppin Street | | | 8 February 1974 | TR3776953006; 51°13′36″N 1°24′15″E | | 1069867 | Upload Photo | Q26323235 |
| 13, Coppin Street | II | 13, Coppin Street | | | 8 February 1974 | TR3777652989; 51°13′36″N 1°24′15″E | | 1363464 | Upload Photo | Q26645290 |
| 14, Coppin Street | II | 14, Coppin Street | | | 8 February 1974 | TR3777252989; 51°13′36″N 1°24′15″E | | 1262761 | Upload Photo | Q26553616 |
| 15, Coppin Street | II | 15, Coppin Street | | | 8 February 1974 | TR3776452986; 51°13′35″N 1°24′14″E | | 1069868 | Upload Photo | Q26323237 |
| 16, Coppin Street | II | 16, Coppin Street | | | 8 February 1974 | TR3774652985; 51°13′35″N 1°24′13″E | | 1262723 | Upload Photo | Q26553581 |
| 17, Coppin Street | II | 17, Coppin Street | | | 8 February 1974 | TR3774052986; 51°13′35″N 1°24′13″E | | 1363425 | Upload Photo | Q26645251 |
| The Den | II | 1, Crown Court | | | 8 February 1974 | TR3778652529; 51°13′21″N 1°24′14″E | | 1069869 | Upload Photo | Q26323240 |
| 2, Crown Court | II | 2, Crown Court | | | 8 February 1974 | TR3777952532; 51°13′21″N 1°24′14″E | | 1251529 | Upload Photo | Q26543482 |
| 1, Dolphin Street | II | 1, Dolphin Street | | | 8 February 1974 | TR3771853278; 51°13′45″N 1°24′13″E | | 1069870 | Upload Photo | Q26323242 |
| 2, Dolphin Street | II | 2, Dolphin Street | | | 8 February 1974 | TR3772453278; 51°13′45″N 1°24′13″E | | 1363426 | Upload Photo | Q26645252 |
| 3, Dolphin Street | II | 3, Dolphin Street | | | 8 February 1974 | TR3772953279; 51°13′45″N 1°24′13″E | | 1251531 | Upload Photo | Q26543483 |
| 4, Dolphin Street | II | 4, Dolphin Street | | | 8 February 1974 | TR3773553275; 51°13′45″N 1°24′14″E | | 1069871 | Upload Photo | Q26323244 |
| 5, Dolphin Street | II | 5, Dolphin Street | | | 8 February 1974 | TR3774353277; 51°13′45″N 1°24′14″E | | 1251533 | Upload Photo | Q26543484 |
| 6, Dolphin Street | II | 6, Dolphin Street | | | 8 February 1974 | TR3775153277; 51°13′45″N 1°24′14″E | | 1363427 | Upload Photo | Q26645253 |
| 7 and 8, Dolphin Street | II | 7 and 8, Dolphin Street | | | 8 February 1974 | TR3775553277; 51°13′45″N 1°24′15″E | | 1069872 | Upload Photo | Q26323246 |
| 9, Dolphin Street | II | 9, Dolphin Street | | | 8 February 1974 | TR3776153278; 51°13′45″N 1°24′15″E | | 1262702 | Upload Photo | Q26553562 |
| 10 and 11, Dolphin Street | II | 10 and 11, Dolphin Street | | | 8 February 1974 | TR3776753279; 51°13′45″N 1°24′15″E | | 1069873 | Upload Photo | Q26323248 |
| 12, Dolphin Street | II | 12, Dolphin Street | | | 8 February 1974 | TR3775553262; 51°13′44″N 1°24′14″E | | 1363428 | Upload Photo | Q26645254 |
| 13, Dolphin Street | II | 13, Dolphin Street | | | 8 February 1974 | TR3775053259; 51°13′44″N 1°24′14″E | | 1251549 | Upload Photo | Q26543498 |
| 14, Dolphin Street | II | 14, Dolphin Street | | | 8 February 1974 | TR3774653261; 51°13′44″N 1°24′14″E | | 1069874 | Upload Photo | Q26323250 |
| 15, Dolphin Street | II | 15, Dolphin Street | | | 8 February 1974 | TR3774153262; 51°13′44″N 1°24′14″E | | 1251560 | Upload Photo | Q26543508 |
| 16, Dolphin Street | II | 16, Dolphin Street | | | 8 February 1974 | TR3773653259; 51°13′44″N 1°24′14″E | | 1363448 | Upload Photo | Q26645274 |
| 17 and 18, Dolphin Street | II | 17 and 18, Dolphin Street | | | 8 February 1974 | TR3772753262; 51°13′44″N 1°24′13″E | | 1069830 | Upload Photo | Q26323171 |
| 2-7, Exchange Street | II | 2-7, Exchange Street | | | 8 February 1974 | TR3773053214; 51°13′43″N 1°24′13″E | | 1069833 | Upload Photo | Q26323176 |
| 1 and 3, Farrier Street | II | 1 and 3, Farrier Street | | | 8 February 1974 | TR3767453051; 51°13′38″N 1°24′10″E | | 1363451 | Upload Photo | Q26645277 |
| 2 and 4, Farrier Street | II | 2 and 4, Farrier Street | | | 8 February 1974 | TR3768053036; 51°13′37″N 1°24′10″E | | 1252103 | Upload Photo | Q26544005 |
| 5, Farrier Street | II | 5, Farrier Street | | | 8 February 1974 | TR3768253049; 51°13′38″N 1°24′10″E | | 1069834 | Upload Photo | Q26323178 |
| The Deal Lugger | II | 6, Farrier Street | | | 8 February 1974 | TR3772753039; 51°13′37″N 1°24′13″E | | 1069841 | Upload Photo | Q26323192 |
| Melbourne | II | 7, Farrier Street | | | 8 February 1974 | TR3769353052; 51°13′38″N 1°24′11″E | | 1363452 | Upload Photo | Q26645278 |
| 8, Farrier Street | II | 8, Farrier Street | | | 1 June 1949 | TR3773053037; 51°13′37″N 1°24′13″E | | 1069842 | Upload Photo | Q26323195 |
| Vargas House | II | 9, Farrier Street | | | 8 February 1974 | TR3771653056; 51°13′38″N 1°24′12″E | | 1069835 | Upload Photo | Q26323180 |
| 10, Farrier Street | II | 10, Farrier Street | | | 1 June 1949 | TR3773653036; 51°13′37″N 1°24′13″E | | 1252105 | Upload Photo | Q26544007 |
| 11, Farrier Street | II | 11, Farrier Street | | | 8 February 1974 | TR3772153057; 51°13′38″N 1°24′12″E | | 1069836 | Upload Photo | Q26323182 |
| 12 and 14, Farrier Street | II | 12 and 14, Farrier Street | | | 1 June 1949 | TR3774353044; 51°13′37″N 1°24′13″E | | 1069843 | Upload Photo | Q26323197 |
| 13, Farrier Street | II | 13, Farrier Street | | | 8 February 1974 | TR3772853058; 51°13′38″N 1°24′13″E | | 1069837 | Upload Photo | Q26323184 |
| 15, Farrier Street | II | 15, Farrier Street | | | 8 February 1974 | TR3773053060; 51°13′38″N 1°24′13″E | | 1262460 | Upload Photo | Q26553333 |
| 17, Farrier Street | II | 17, Farrier Street | | | 8 February 1974 | TR3773753063; 51°13′38″N 1°24′13″E | | 1069838 | Upload Photo | Q26323186 |
| Caroline Cottage | II | 18, Farrier Street | | | 8 February 1974 | TR3775353047; 51°13′37″N 1°24′14″E | | 1069844 | Upload Photo | Q26323198 |
| 19, Farrier Street | II | 19, Farrier Street | | | 8 February 1974 | TR3774753064; 51°13′38″N 1°24′14″E | | 1069839 | Upload Photo | Q26323188 |
| 21 and 23, Farrier Street | II | 21 and 23, Farrier Street | | | 8 February 1974 | TR3775653068; 51°13′38″N 1°24′14″E | | 1252098 | Upload Photo | Q26544002 |
| Lumsden House | II | 22, Farrier Street | | | 8 February 1974 | TR3775853048; 51°13′37″N 1°24′14″E | | 1252121 | Upload Photo | Q26544023 |
| 25, Farrier Street | II | 25, Farrier Street | | | 8 February 1974 | TR3776253069; 51°13′38″N 1°24′14″E | | 1069840 | Upload Photo | Q26323190 |
| 1, Golden Street | II | 1, Golden Street | | | 8 February 1974 | TR3772653113; 51°13′40″N 1°24′13″E | | 1363453 | Upload Photo | Q26645279 |
| Red Roofs | II | 2, Golden Street | | | 8 February 1974 | TR3773153112; 51°13′40″N 1°24′13″E | | 1262441 | Upload Photo | Q26553314 |
| 3, Golden Street | II | 3, Golden Street | | | 8 February 1974 | TR3773753112; 51°13′40″N 1°24′13″E | | 1069845 | Upload Photo | Q26323199 |
| 4, Golden Street | II | 4, Golden Street | | | 8 February 1974 | TR3774053112; 51°13′40″N 1°24′13″E | | 1363454 | Upload Photo | Q26645280 |
| 5, Golden Street | II | 5, Golden Street | | | 8 February 1974 | TR3775053110; 51°13′39″N 1°24′14″E | | 1262443 | Upload Photo | Q26553316 |
| 6, Golden Street | II | 6, Golden Street | | | 8 February 1974 | TR3775653113; 51°13′40″N 1°24′14″E | | 1069846 | Upload Photo | Q26323200 |
| 9, Golden Street | II | 9, Golden Street | | | 8 February 1974 | TR3775553089; 51°13′39″N 1°24′14″E | | 1069847 | Upload Photo | Q26323201 |
| 10, Golden Street | II | 10, Golden Street | | | 8 February 1974 | TR3774953092; 51°13′39″N 1°24′14″E | | 1262423 | Upload Photo | Q26553298 |
| 11, Golden Street | II | 11, Golden Street | | | 8 February 1974 | TR3774253093; 51°13′39″N 1°24′13″E | | 1363455 | Upload Photo | Q26645281 |
| 12, Golden Street | II | 12, Golden Street | | | 8 February 1974 | TR3773853092; 51°13′39″N 1°24′13″E | | 1252180 | Upload Photo | Q26544074 |
| 13, Golden Street | II | 13, Golden Street | | | 8 February 1974 | TR3772953092; 51°13′39″N 1°24′13″E | | 1069848 | Upload Photo | Q26323202 |
| 4, Griffin Street | II | 4, Griffin Street | | | 8 February 1974 | TR3767053180; 51°13′42″N 1°24′10″E | | 1262400 | Upload Photo | Q26553278 |
| 5, Griffin Street | II | 5, Griffin Street | | | 8 February 1974 | TR3767653181; 51°13′42″N 1°24′10″E | | 1254126 | Upload Photo | Q26545813 |
| 7, Griffin Street | II | 7, Griffin Street | | | 8 February 1974 | TR3768953181; 51°13′42″N 1°24′11″E | | 1254127 | Upload Photo | Q26545814 |
| 8 and 9, Griffin Street | II | 8 and 9, Griffin Street | | | 8 February 1974 | TR3769553181; 51°13′42″N 1°24′11″E | | 1254128 | Upload Photo | Q26545815 |
| Crusader House | II | 11, Griffin Street | | | 8 February 1974 | TR3774853190; 51°13′42″N 1°24′14″E | | 1261459 | Upload Photo | Q26552407 |
| 12, Griffin Street | II | 12, Griffin Street | | | 8 February 1974 | TR3775253191; 51°13′42″N 1°24′14″E | | 1254136 | Upload Photo | Q26545821 |
| 13, Griffin Street | II | 13, Griffin Street | | | 1 June 1949 | TR3774953172; 51°13′41″N 1°24′14″E | | 1069849 | Upload Photo | Q26323203 |
| 14, Griffin Street | II | 14, Griffin Street | | | 1 June 1949 | TR3774453171; 51°13′41″N 1°24′14″E | | 1363457 | Upload Photo | Q26645283 |
| 15, Griffin Street | II | 15, Griffin Street | | | 1 June 1949 | TR3773953170; 51°13′41″N 1°24′13″E | | 1252526 | Upload Photo | Q26544380 |
| Adelaide House | II | 16, Griffin Street | | | 1 June 1949 | TR3773453168; 51°13′41″N 1°24′13″E | | 1069850 | Upload Photo | Q26323204 |
| 17, Griffin Street | II | 17, Griffin Street | | | 1 June 1949 | TR3772953167; 51°13′41″N 1°24′13″E | | 1069851 | Upload Photo | Q26323205 |
| 18, Griffin Street | II | 18, Griffin Street | | | 1 June 1949 | TR3769253163; 51°13′41″N 1°24′11″E | | 1253170 | Upload Photo | Q26544958 |
| Porthole Cottage | II | 19, Griffin Street | | | 8 February 1974 | TR3767453167; 51°13′41″N 1°24′10″E | | 1363458 | Upload Photo | Q26645284 |
| Black Horse Hotel | II | High Street | | | 26 June 1981 | TR3771252653; 51°13′25″N 1°24′11″E | | 1261472 | Upload Photo | Q26552419 |
| Church of St George | II* | High Street | | | 1 June 1949 | TR3763252850; 51°13′31″N 1°24′07″E | | 1253171 | Upload Photo | Q17557805 |
| St George's Church Memorial Cross | II* | High Street | | | 11 March 2015 | TR3765952862; 51°13′32″N 1°24′09″E | | 1425375 | Upload Photo | Q26263551 |
| The Town Hall | II | High Street | | | 8 February 1974 | TR3766252910; 51°13′33″N 1°24′09″E | | 1363477 | Upload Photo | Q26645303 |
| New Inn | II | 32, High Street | | | 8 February 1974 | TR3771152624; 51°13′24″N 1°24′11″E | | 1343691 | Upload Photo | Q26627470 |
| 34b, High Street | II | 34b, High Street | | | 18 October 1995 | TR3772952642; 51°13′24″N 1°24′12″E | | 1254114 | Upload Photo | Q26545802 |
| 114, High Street | II | 114, High Street | | | 20 August 1973 | TR3768852905; 51°13′33″N 1°24′10″E | | 1069812 | Upload Photo | Q26323136 |
| 115, High Street | II | 115, High Street | | | 20 August 1973 | TR3766152918; 51°13′33″N 1°24′09″E | | 1069808 | Upload Photo | Q26323128 |
| 117 and 117a, High Street | II | 117 and 117a, High Street | | | 20 August 1973 | TR3765552920; 51°13′33″N 1°24′09″E | | 1069809 | Upload Photo | Q26323130 |
| 119, High Street | II | 119, High Street | | | 20 August 1973 | TR3765452930; 51°13′34″N 1°24′09″E | | 1363478 | Upload Photo | Q26645304 |
| Former Central Hall | II | 120a, High Street | | | 20 August 1973 | TR3769752941; 51°13′34″N 1°24′11″E | | 1343692 | Upload Photo | Q26627471 |
| 121, High Street | II | 121, High Street | | | 20 August 1973 | TR3765352932; 51°13′34″N 1°24′08″E | | 1069810 | Upload Photo | Q26323132 |
| Comarques | II | 122, High Street | | | 20 August 1973 | TR3768352963; 51°13′35″N 1°24′10″E | | 1069813 | Upload Photo | Q26323139 |
| 123, High Street | II | 123, High Street | | | 20 August 1973 | TR3764952935; 51°13′34″N 1°24′08″E | | 1363479 | Upload Photo | Q26645305 |
| Yon Sea | II | 124, High Street | | | 20 August 1973 | TR3768052972; 51°13′35″N 1°24′10″E | | 1069814 | Upload Photo | Q26323141 |
| 125, High Street | II | 125, High Street | | | 20 August 1973 | TR3765452943; 51°13′34″N 1°24′09″E | | 1363480 | Upload Photo | Q26645306 |
| 127, High Street | II | 127, High Street | | | 20 August 1973 | TR3764952955; 51°13′35″N 1°24′08″E | | 1069811 | Upload Photo | Q26323134 |
| 164, High Street | II | 164, High Street | | | 8 February 1974 | TR3766453101; 51°13′39″N 1°24′09″E | | 1253227 | Upload Photo | Q26545001 |
| 178 and 180, High Street | II | 178 and 180, High Street | | | 1 June 1949 | TR3766453145; 51°13′41″N 1°24′10″E | | 1069815 | Upload Photo | Q26323143 |
| K6 Telephone Kiosk | II | London Road | | | 14 July 2010 | TR3622651899; 51°13′03″N 1°22′53″E | | 1393876 | Upload Photo | Q26896212 |
| Milestone House | II | 188, London Road | | | 1 June 1949 | TR3651052042; 51°13′07″N 1°23′08″E | | 1069817 | Upload Photo | Q26323147 |
| 285-293, London Road | II | 285-293, London Road | | | 8 February 1974 | TR3634551975; 51°13′05″N 1°22′59″E | | 1261645 | Upload Photo | Q26552578 |
| Jenkin's Well | II | 288, London Road | | | 1 June 1949 | TR3622451920; 51°13′03″N 1°22′53″E | | 1069818 | Upload Photo | Q26323149 |
| Manor House Cottage | II | 58, Manor Road | | | 8 February 1974 | TR3642551774; 51°12′58″N 1°23′03″E | | 1069819 | Upload Photo | Q26323151 |
| Holly Farm | II | 80, Manor Road | | | 8 February 1974 | TR3633351861; 51°13′01″N 1°22′58″E | | 1253759 | Upload Photo | Q26545484 |
| The Admiral Keppel Inn | II | 90, Manor Road | | | 8 February 1974 | TR3629251883; 51°13′02″N 1°22′56″E | | 1069820 | Upload Photo | Q26323153 |
| Norman House | II | 92, Manor Road | | | 1 June 1949 | TR3628151890; 51°13′02″N 1°22′55″E | | 1069821 | Upload Photo | Q26323155 |
| 94 and 96, Manor Road | II | 94 and 96, Manor Road | | | 1 June 1949 | TR3627351895; 51°13′02″N 1°22′55″E | | 1253762 | Upload Photo | Q26545487 |
| 96a, Manor Road | II | 96a, Manor Road, CT14 9DB | | | 8 February 1974 | TR3626251901; 51°13′03″N 1°22′54″E | | 1069822 | Upload Photo | Q26323157 |
| 98, Manor Road | II | 98, Manor Road, CT14 9DB | | | 8 February 1974 | TR3625951904; 51°13′03″N 1°22′54″E | | 1343693 | Upload Photo | Q26627472 |
| 2, Market Street | II | 2, Market Street | | | 8 February 1974 | TR3772352810; 51°13′30″N 1°24′12″E | | 1253767 | Upload Photo | Q26545492 |
| 9, Market Street | II | 9, Market Street | | | 8 February 1974 | TR3776252827; 51°13′30″N 1°24′14″E | | 1069823 | Upload Photo | Q26323159 |
| 12, Market Street | II | 12, Market Street | | | 8 February 1974 | TR3775852808; 51°13′30″N 1°24′14″E | | 1261618 | Upload Photo | Q26552553 |
| Sherrard House | II | 52, Middle Deal Road | | | 8 February 1974 | TR3708652718; 51°13′28″N 1°23′39″E | | 1343694 | Upload Photo | Q26627473 |
| Berkeley House | II | 87 and 87a, Middle Deal Road | | | 1 June 1949 | TR3704352668; 51°13′26″N 1°23′36″E | | 1363445 | Upload Photo | Q26645271 |
| Rossway | II | 131, Middle Deal Road | | | 1 June 1949 | TR3694752543; 51°13′22″N 1°23′31″E | | 1069825 | Upload Photo | Q26323163 |
| 302, Middle Deal Road | II | 302, Middle Deal Road | | | 8 February 1974 | TR3647752155; 51°13′11″N 1°23′06″E | | 1069824 | Upload Photo | Q26323161 |
| Eythorne Cottage | II | 362, Middle Deal Road | | | 8 February 1974 | TR3634052023; 51°13′06″N 1°22′59″E | | 1261619 | Upload Photo | Q26552554 |
| Outbuilding Behind No 13 | II | Middle Street | | | 1 June 1949 | TR3774152583; 51°13′22″N 1°24′12″E | | 1253779 | Upload Photo | Q26545503 |
| 2, Middle Street | II | 2, Middle Street | | | 8 February 1974 | TR3777152532; 51°13′21″N 1°24′14″E | | 1069804 | Upload Photo | Q26323120 |
| 4, Middle Street | II | 4, Middle Street | | | 8 February 1974 | TR3777452540; 51°13′21″N 1°24′14″E | | 1261580 | Upload Photo | Q26552516 |
| 5, Middle Street | II | 5, Middle Street | | | 8 February 1974 | TR3775052553; 51°13′21″N 1°24′13″E | | 1253772 | Upload Photo | Q26545496 |
| 6 and 8, Middle Street | II | 6 and 8, Middle Street | | | 8 February 1974 | TR3777452544; 51°13′21″N 1°24′14″E | | 1363475 | Upload Photo | Q26645301 |
| The Old House | II | 7, Middle Street | | | 1 June 1949 | TR3775452562; 51°13′22″N 1°24′13″E | | 1069826 | Upload Photo | Q26323165 |
| 9, Middle Street | II | 9, Middle Street | | | 8 February 1974 | TR3775552566; 51°13′22″N 1°24′13″E | | 1253773 | Upload Photo | Q26545497 |
| 10, Middle Street | II | 10, Middle Street | | | 8 February 1974 | TR3777352558; 51°13′22″N 1°24′14″E | | 1253841 | Upload Photo | Q26545557 |
| 11, Middle Street | II | 11, Middle Street | | | 1 June 1949 | TR3775152570; 51°13′22″N 1°24′13″E | | 1363446 | Upload Photo | Q26645272 |
| 12, Middle Street | II | 12, Middle Street | | | 8 February 1974 | TR3777352564; 51°13′22″N 1°24′14″E | | 1069805 | Upload Photo | Q26323122 |
| Queen Anne House | II* | 13, Middle Street | | | 1 June 1949 | TR3775052579; 51°13′22″N 1°24′13″E | | 1069827 | Upload Photo | Q17557620 |
| Stonar House | II | 14, Middle Street | | | 8 February 1974 | TR3777452581; 51°13′22″N 1°24′14″E | | 1069806 | Upload Photo | Q26323124 |
| The Anchorage | II | 69, Middle Street | | | 8 February 1974 | TR3772052823; 51°13′30″N 1°24′12″E | | 1363447 | Upload Photo | Q26645273 |
| 73, Middle Street | II | 73, Middle Street | | | 8 February 1974 | TR3771252877; 51°13′32″N 1°24′11″E | | 1253783 | Upload Photo | Q26545507 |
| The Five Bells | II | 75, Middle Street | | | 1 June 1949 | TR3771252880; 51°13′32″N 1°24′11″E | | 1069829 | Upload Photo | Q26323169 |
| 81, Middle Street | II | 81, Middle Street | | | 8 February 1974 | TR3771252925; 51°13′34″N 1°24′11″E | | 1253785 | Upload Photo | Q26545509 |
| Vane House | II | 82, Middle Street | | | 8 February 1974 | TR3773352951; 51°13′34″N 1°24′13″E | | 1261583 | Upload Photo | Q26552519 |
| 83, Middle Street | II | 83, Middle Street | | | 8 February 1974 | TR3771152929; 51°13′34″N 1°24′11″E | | 1069785 | Upload Photo | Q26323080 |
| 84, Middle Street | II | 84, Middle Street | | | 8 February 1974 | TR3773352965; 51°13′35″N 1°24′13″E | | 1363476 | Upload Photo | Q26645302 |
| 85, Middle Street | II | 85, Middle Street | | | 8 February 1974 | TR3771052936; 51°13′34″N 1°24′11″E | | 1069786 | Upload Photo | Q26323082 |
| 87-91, Middle Street | II | 87-91, Middle Street | | | 8 February 1974 | TR3771052941; 51°13′34″N 1°24′11″E | | 1363467 | Upload Photo | Q26645293 |
| 88, Middle Street | II | 88, Middle Street | | | 8 February 1974 | TR3773252969; 51°13′35″N 1°24′13″E | | 1069807 | Upload Photo | Q26323126 |
| 90, Middle Street | II | 90, Middle Street | | | 8 February 1974 | TR3773152974; 51°13′35″N 1°24′13″E | | 1253847 | Upload Photo | Q26545563 |
| 92, Middle Street | II | 92, Middle Street | | | 8 February 1974 | TR3773052979; 51°13′35″N 1°24′13″E | | 1343706 | Upload Photo | Q26627483 |
| 93, Middle Street | II | 93, Middle Street | | | 8 February 1974 | TR3770852952; 51°13′34″N 1°24′11″E | | 1069787 | Upload Photo | Q26323084 |
| 94 and 94a, Middle Street | II | 94 and 94a, Middle Street | | | 8 February 1974 | TR3772952984; 51°13′35″N 1°24′12″E | | 1069763 | Upload Photo | Q26323038 |
| 95, Middle Street | II | 95, Middle Street | | | 8 February 1974 | TR3771052956; 51°13′35″N 1°24′11″E | | 1363468 | Upload Photo | Q26645294 |
| 96, Middle Street | II | 96, Middle Street | | | 8 February 1974 | TR3772852991; 51°13′36″N 1°24′12″E | | 1069764 | Upload Photo | Q26323040 |
| 97 and 99, Middle Street | II | 97 and 99, Middle Street | | | 8 February 1974 | TR3771052965; 51°13′35″N 1°24′11″E | | 1069788 | Upload Photo | Q26323086 |
| 98, Middle Street | II | 98, Middle Street | | | 8 February 1974 | TR3772352999; 51°13′36″N 1°24′12″E | | 1343707 | Upload Photo | Q26627484 |
| 100, Middle Street | II | 100, Middle Street | | | 8 February 1974 | TR3772353007; 51°13′36″N 1°24′12″E | | 1069765 | Upload Photo | Q26323042 |
| 105a, Middle Street | II | 105a, Middle Street | | | 8 February 1974 | TR3770652999; 51°13′36″N 1°24′11″E | | 1363469 | Upload Photo | Q26645295 |
| 107, Middle Street | II | 107, Middle Street | | | 8 February 1974 | TR3770453004; 51°13′36″N 1°24′11″E | | 1069789 | Upload Photo | Q26323088 |
| 108, Middle Street | II | 108, Middle Street | | | 14 July 1987 | TR3771853042; 51°13′37″N 1°24′12″E | | 1254062 | Upload Photo | Q26545753 |
| Georgian Cottage | II | 109, Middle Street | | | 8 February 1974 | TR3769653014; 51°13′36″N 1°24′11″E | | 1069790 | Upload Photo | Q26323091 |
| 110, Middle Street | II | 110, Middle Street | | | 8 February 1974 | TR3771353057; 51°13′38″N 1°24′12″E | | 1343708 | Upload Photo | Q26627485 |
| 111 and 113, Middle Street | II | 111 and 113, Middle Street | | | 8 February 1974 | TR3769953024; 51°13′37″N 1°24′11″E | | 1363470 | Upload Photo | Q26645296 |
| 112 and 114, Middle Street | II | 112 and 114, Middle Street | | | 8 February 1974 | TR3771653064; 51°13′38″N 1°24′12″E | | 1069766 | Upload Photo | Q26323044 |
| 115, Middle Street | II | 115, Middle Street | | | 8 February 1974 | TR3769653031; 51°13′37″N 1°24′11″E | | 1069791 | Upload Photo | Q26323093 |
| 116, Middle Street | II | 116, Middle Street | | | 8 February 1974 | TR3772053072; 51°13′38″N 1°24′12″E | | 1343709 | Upload Photo | Q26627486 |
| 117, Middle Street | II | 117, Middle Street | | | 8 February 1974 | TR3769453037; 51°13′37″N 1°24′11″E | | 1363471 | Upload Photo | Q26645297 |
| 118, Middle Street | II | 118, Middle Street | | | 8 February 1974 | TR3772053077; 51°13′38″N 1°24′12″E | | 1069767 | Upload Photo | Q26323046 |
| 119, Middle Street | II | 119, Middle Street | | | 8 February 1974 | TR3769053041; 51°13′37″N 1°24′11″E | | 1069792 | Upload Photo | Q26323095 |
| 120, Middle Street | II | 120, Middle Street | | | 8 February 1974 | TR3772253083; 51°13′39″N 1°24′12″E | | 1069768 | Upload Photo | Q26323048 |
| 122, Middle Street | II | 122, Middle Street | | | 8 February 1974 | TR3772353087; 51°13′39″N 1°24′12″E | | 1343710 | Upload Photo | Q26627487 |
| 123, Middle Street | II | 123, Middle Street | | | 8 February 1974 | TR3769353059; 51°13′38″N 1°24′11″E | | 1253793 | Upload Photo | Q26545516 |
| 124, Middle Street | II | 124, Middle Street | | | 8 February 1974 | TR3772053092; 51°13′39″N 1°24′12″E | | 1069769 | Upload Photo | Q26323050 |
| 125, Middle Street | II | 125, Middle Street | | | 8 February 1974 | TR3770253071; 51°13′38″N 1°24′11″E | | 1069793 | Upload Photo | Q26323097 |
| 126, Middle Street | II | 126, Middle Street | | | 8 February 1974 | TR3772653094; 51°13′39″N 1°24′13″E | | 1343711 | Upload Photo | Q26627488 |
| 127, Middle Street | II | 127, Middle Street | | | 8 February 1974 | TR3770453074; 51°13′38″N 1°24′11″E | | 1253799 | Upload Photo | Q26545522 |
| 129, Middle Street | II | 129, Middle Street | | | 8 February 1974 | TR3770353081; 51°13′39″N 1°24′11″E | | 1069794 | Upload Photo | Q26323099 |
| 131, Middle Street | II | 131, Middle Street | | | 8 February 1974 | TR3770553083; 51°13′39″N 1°24′11″E | | 1069795 | Upload Photo | Q26323101 |
| 133, Middle Street | II | 133, Middle Street | | | 8 March 1984 | TR3770553100; 51°13′39″N 1°24′12″E | | 1069753 | Upload Photo | Q26323020 |
| Primrose Cottage | II | 140, Middle Street | | | 8 February 1974 | TR3772553186; 51°13′42″N 1°24′13″E | | 1253892 | Upload Photo | Q26545601 |
| The Ship Inn | II | 141, Middle Street | | | 1 June 1949 | TR3770853122; 51°13′40″N 1°24′12″E | | 1261597 | Upload Photo | Q26552532 |
| 142, Middle Street | II | 142, Middle Street | | | 8 February 1974 | TR3772853192; 51°13′42″N 1°24′13″E | | 1069770 | Upload Photo | Q26323052 |
| 142a and 144, Middle Street | II | 142a and 144, Middle Street | | | 8 February 1974 | TR3772353198; 51°13′42″N 1°24′13″E | | 1069771 | Upload Photo | Q26323054 |
| 143, Middle Street | II | 143, Middle Street | | | 8 February 1974 | TR3771053131; 51°13′40″N 1°24′12″E | | 1069796 | Upload Photo | Q26323103 |
| 145, Middle Street | II | 145, Middle Street | | | 1 June 1949 | TR3771053138; 51°13′40″N 1°24′12″E | | 1069797 | Upload Photo | Q26323105 |
| Keppel Cottage | II | 146, Middle Street | | | 8 February 1974 | TR3772653204; 51°13′43″N 1°24′13″E | | 1253895 | Upload Photo | Q26545604 |
| 147, Middle Street | II | 147, Middle Street | | | 8 February 1974 | TR3771453144; 51°13′41″N 1°24′12″E | | 1261598 | Upload Photo | Q26552533 |
| 148, Middle Street | II | 148, Middle Street | | | 8 February 1974 | TR3772553208; 51°13′43″N 1°24′13″E | | 1069772 | Upload Photo | Q26323056 |
| 149, Middle Street | II | 149, Middle Street | | | 8 February 1974 | TR3770853160; 51°13′41″N 1°24′12″E | | 1253804 | Upload Photo | Q26545526 |
| 149a, Middle Street | II | 149a, Middle Street | | | 8 February 1974 | TR3770953153; 51°13′41″N 1°24′12″E | | 1069798 | Upload Photo | Q26323107 |
| 151-155, Middle Street | II | 151-155, Middle Street | | | 8 February 1974 | TR3770953164; 51°13′41″N 1°24′12″E | | 1069799 | Upload Photo | Q26323109 |
| 156, Middle Street | II | 156, Middle Street | | | 8 February 1974 | TR3772053251; 51°13′44″N 1°24′13″E | | 1069773 | Upload Photo | Q26323058 |
| 161-165, Middle Street | II | 161-165, Middle Street | | | 8 February 1974 | TR3770453209; 51°13′43″N 1°24′12″E | | 1069800 | Upload Photo | Q26323111 |
| Dolphin Cottage | II | 164, Middle Street | | | 8 February 1974 | TR3771253279; 51°13′45″N 1°24′12″E | | 1261539 | Upload Photo | Q26552480 |
| 169, Middle Street | II | 169, Middle Street | | | 8 February 1974 | TR3770453215; 51°13′43″N 1°24′12″E | | 1253814 | Upload Photo | Q26545535 |
| 171, Middle Street | II | 171, Middle Street | | | 8 February 1974 | TR3770453221; 51°13′43″N 1°24′12″E | | 1363472 | Upload Photo | Q26645298 |
| 173, Middle Street | II | 173, Middle Street | | | 8 February 1974 | TR3770353226; 51°13′43″N 1°24′12″E | | 1069801 | Upload Photo | Q26323114 |
| 175, Middle Street | II | 175, Middle Street | | | 8 February 1974 | TR3770353230; 51°13′43″N 1°24′12″E | | 1253823 | Upload Photo | Q26545544 |
| 177, Middle Street | II | 177, Middle Street | | | 8 February 1974 | TR3770153235; 51°13′44″N 1°24′12″E | | 1363473 | Upload Photo | Q26645299 |
| 179, Middle Street | II | 179, Middle Street | | | 8 February 1974 | TR3770053240; 51°13′44″N 1°24′12″E | | 1253825 | Upload Photo | Q26545546 |
| 181, Middle Street | II | 181, Middle Street | | | 8 February 1974 | TR3770053243; 51°13′44″N 1°24′12″E | | 1069802 | Upload Photo | Q26323116 |
| 183, Middle Street | II | 183, Middle Street | | | 8 February 1974 | TR3769853249; 51°13′44″N 1°24′12″E | | 1069803 | Upload Photo | Q26323118 |
| 185, Middle Street | II | 185, Middle Street | | | 8 February 1974 | TR3769853254; 51°13′44″N 1°24′12″E | | 1253827 | Upload Photo | Q26545548 |
| 187, Middle Street | II | 187, Middle Street | | | 8 February 1974 | TR3769753262; 51°13′44″N 1°24′12″E | | 1363474 | Upload Photo | Q26645300 |
| 2-14, Mill Road | II | 2-14, Mill Road | | | 8 February 1974 | TR3741152407; 51°13′17″N 1°23′55″E | | 1069774 | Upload Photo | Q26323060 |
| Wellington House | II | 102, Mill Road | | | 8 February 1974 | TR3720052191; 51°13′11″N 1°23′43″E | | 1253917 | Upload Photo | Q26545626 |
| Chapel | II | Nelson Street | | | 8 February 1974 | TR3750453108; 51°13′40″N 1°24′01″E | | 1253918 | Upload Photo | Q26545627 |
| 2, New Street | II | 2, New Street | | | 8 February 1974 | TR3766953099; 51°13′39″N 1°24′10″E | | 1069777 | Upload Photo | Q26323066 |
| 3, New Street | II | 3, New Street | | | 8 February 1974 | TR3767253099; 51°13′39″N 1°24′10″E | | 1069778 | Upload Photo | Q26323068 |
| 5, New Street | II | 5, New Street | | | 8 February 1974 | TR3768453103; 51°13′39″N 1°24′10″E | | 1261550 | Upload Photo | Q26552491 |
| 6, New Street | II | 6, New Street | | | 8 February 1974 | TR3769353101; 51°13′39″N 1°24′11″E | | 1343712 | Upload Photo | Q26627489 |
| 8, New Street | II | 8, New Street | | | 8 February 1974 | TR3768753088; 51°13′39″N 1°24′11″E | | 1253919 | Upload Photo | Q26545628 |
| Fleet House | II | 2, North Street | | | 8 February 1974 | TR3773053299; 51°13′46″N 1°24′13″E | | 1069779 | Upload Photo | Q26323070 |
| 3 and 4, North Street | II | 3 and 4, North Street | | | 8 February 1974 | TR3773653305; 51°13′46″N 1°24′14″E | | 1069780 | Upload Photo | Q26323072 |
| Mendham Cottage | II | 8, North Street | | | 8 February 1974 | TR3774753283; 51°13′45″N 1°24′14″E | | 1253920 | Upload Photo | Q26545629 |
| 10-12, North Street | II | 10-12, North Street | | | 8 February 1974 | TR3774153283; 51°13′45″N 1°24′14″E | | 1343713 | Upload Photo | Q26627490 |
| 1, Oak Street | II | 1, Oak Street | | | 20 August 1973 | TR3769152909; 51°13′33″N 1°24′10″E | | 1069783 | Upload Photo | Q26323076 |
| 2-6, Oak Street | II | 2-6, Oak Street | | | 8 February 1974 | TR3769652897; 51°13′33″N 1°24′11″E | | 1069784 | Upload Photo | Q26323078 |
| 13, Oak Street | II | 13, Oak Street | | | 8 February 1974 | TR3775752901; 51°13′33″N 1°24′14″E | | 1261556 | Upload Photo | Q26552496 |
| Bosun's Cottage | II | 15, Oak Street | | | 8 February 1974 | TR3775952904; 51°13′33″N 1°24′14″E | | 1363465 | Upload Photo | Q26645291 |
| 1, Portobello Court | II | 1, Portobello Court | | | 8 February 1974 | TR3771053144; 51°13′41″N 1°24′12″E | | 1253931 | Upload Photo | Q26545640 |
| Old Chelsea | II | 2, Portobello Court | | | 8 February 1974 | TR3770553143; 51°13′41″N 1°24′12″E | | 1363466 | Upload Photo | Q26645292 |
| 3, Portobello Court | II | 3, Portobello Court | | | 8 February 1974 | TR3770353142; 51°13′41″N 1°24′12″E | | 1253935 | Upload Photo | Q26545643 |
| 4 and 5, Portobello Court | II | 4 and 5, Portobello Court | | | 8 February 1974 | TR3770553156; 51°13′41″N 1°24′12″E | | 1069740 | Upload Photo | Q26322993 |
| Sydney House | II | 1, Princes Street | | | 8 February 1974 | TR3753053174; 51°13′42″N 1°24′03″E | | 1343696 | Upload Photo | Q26627474 |
| Yewdale | II | 3, Princes Street | | | 8 February 1974 | TR3752953178; 51°13′42″N 1°24′03″E | | 1069741 | Upload Photo | Q26322995 |
| 13, Queen Street | II | 13, Queen Street | | | 8 February 1974 | TR3762952580; 51°13′23″N 1°24′06″E | | 1069742 | Upload Photo | Q26322997 |
| 14, Queen Street | II | 14, Queen Street | | | 8 February 1974 | TR3763552616; 51°13′24″N 1°24′07″E | | 1261525 | Upload Photo | Q26552466 |
| Church of St Leonards | II* | Rectory Road | | | 1 June 1949 | TR3626751853; 51°13′01″N 1°22′55″E | | 1343697 | Upload Photo | Q17557862 |
| The Rectory | II | 3, Rectory Road | | | 1 June 1949 | TR3625951824; 51°13′00″N 1°22′54″E | | 1069743 | Upload Photo | Q26323000 |
| Tormore School | II | 5, Rectory Road | | | 8 February 1974 | TR3620551797; 51°12′59″N 1°22′51″E | | 1261528 | Upload Photo | Q26552469 |
| Court House | II | 14, Rectory Road | | | 8 February 1974 | TR3621651842; 51°13′01″N 1°22′52″E | | 1343698 | Upload Photo | Q26627475 |
| 1, Sandown Road | II | 1, Sandown Road | | | 8 February 1974 | TR3769353294; 51°13′45″N 1°24′11″E | | 1261533 | Upload Photo | Q26552474 |
| 2, Silver Street | II | 2, Silver Street | | | 8 February 1974 | TR3773053143; 51°13′41″N 1°24′13″E | | 1069744 | Upload Photo | Q26323002 |
| The Noggin | II | 5, Silver Street | | | 8 February 1974 | TR3775653147; 51°13′41″N 1°24′14″E | | 1343699 | Upload Photo | Q26627476 |
| 11, Silver Street | II | 11, Silver Street | | | 8 February 1974 | TR3776253130; 51°13′40″N 1°24′15″E | | 1253965 | Upload Photo | Q26545669 |
| 12, Silver Street | II | 12, Silver Street | | | 8 February 1974 | TR3775653133; 51°13′40″N 1°24′14″E | | 1069745 | Upload Photo | Q26323004 |
| Silver Cottage | II | 13, Silver Street | | | 8 February 1974 | TR3774953128; 51°13′40″N 1°24′14″E | | 1069746 | Upload Photo | Q26323006 |
| Benbow Cottage | II | 14, Silver Street | | | 8 February 1974 | TR3774453130; 51°13′40″N 1°24′14″E | | 1261537 | Upload Photo | Q26552478 |
| Pieces of Eight | II | 15, Silver Street | | | 8 February 1974 | TR3773853130; 51°13′40″N 1°24′13″E | | 1343700 | Upload Photo | Q26627477 |
| 1a, South Court | II | 1a, South Court | | | 8 February 1974 | TR3773152566; 51°13′22″N 1°24′12″E | | 1069747 | Upload Photo | Q26323008 |
| Carter House | II | 9, South Street | | | 8 February 1974 | TR3777952522; 51°13′20″N 1°24′14″E | | 1253971 | Upload Photo | Q26545674 |
| Walnut Trees | II | 4, Southwall Road | | | 17 January 1989 | TR3701752717; 51°13′28″N 1°23′35″E | | 1254072 | Upload Photo | Q26545763 |
| 4, St George's Passage | II | 4, St George's Passage | | | 8 February 1974 | TR3771852867; 51°13′32″N 1°24′12″E | | 1069828 | Upload Photo | Q26323167 |
| Head Post Office | II | Stanhope Road | | | 8 February 1974 | TR3764452819; 51°13′30″N 1°24′08″E | | 1343701 | Upload Photo | Q26627478 |
| 19-31, Union Road | II | 19-31, Union Road | | | 8 February 1974 | TR3760652962; 51°13′35″N 1°24′06″E | | 1069749 | Upload Photo | Q26323012 |
| Woodbine Cottage | II | 11, Victoria Road | | | 28 January 1986 | TR3765252437; 51°13′18″N 1°24′07″E | | 1069754 | Upload Photo | Q26323022 |
| Timeball Tower Museum | II | Victoria Parade, CT14 7BP | | | 8 February 1974 | TR3780152476; 51°13′19″N 1°24′15″E | | 1069907 | Upload Photo | Q26323316 |
| 13-17, Victoria Road | II | 13-17, Victoria Road | | | 8 February 1974 | TR3766852409; 51°13′17″N 1°24′08″E | | 1253983 | Upload Photo | Q26545686 |
| Duke House | II | 11, Water Street | | | 8 February 1974 | TR3755053160; 51°13′41″N 1°24′04″E | | 1261510 | Upload Photo | Q26552454 |
| Church of St Andrew | II | West Street | | | 17 October 2002 | TR3748253008; 51°13′37″N 1°24′00″E | | 1272422 | Upload Photo | Q26562263 |
| 3, Wood Yard | II | 3, Wood Yard | | | 8 February 1974 | TR3772752901; 51°13′33″N 1°24′12″E | | 1069751 | Upload Photo | Q26323016 |

== See also ==
- Grade I listed buildings in Kent
- Grade II* listed buildings in Kent

== Sources ==
- Newman, John (2013) [1969], Kent: North-East and East, The Buildings of England, New Haven and London: Yale University Press, ISBN 978-0-300-18506-5
