= Deal, Kent =

Town in Kent, England

Coordinates: 51.2226°N 1.4006°E

Deal
- Town
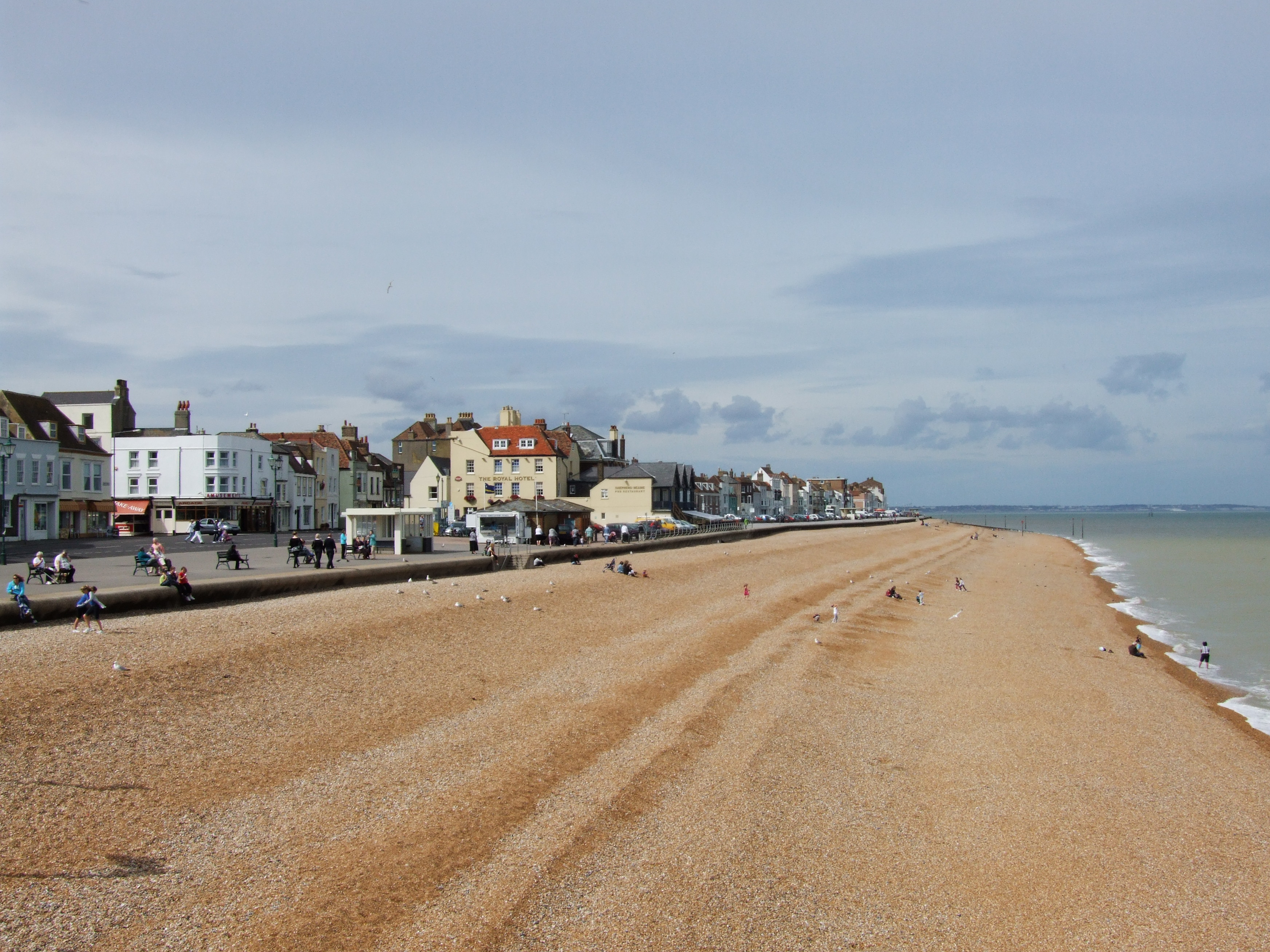
- Deal seafront

- Location within Kent
- Population: 30,917 (2021 census Deal Urban Area)
- OS grid reference: TR375525
  - London: 83.9mi
- District: Dover
- Shire county: Kent
- Region: South East
- Country: England
- Sovereign state: United Kingdom
- Post town: DEAL
- Postcode district: CT14
- Dialling code: 01304
- Police: Kent
- Fire: Kent
- Ambulance: South East Coast
- UK Parliament: Dover and Deal

Deal is a coastal town in Kent, England, which lies where the North Sea and the English Channel meet, 8 miles (13 km) north-east of Dover and 8 miles (13 km) south of Ramsgate. It is a former fishing, mining and garrison town whose history is closely linked to the anchorage in the Downs. Close to Deal is Walmer, a possible location for Julius Caesar's first arrival in Britain.

Deal became a 'limb port' of the Cinque Ports in 1278 and grew into the busiest port in England; today it is a seaside resort, its streets and houses a reminder of its history along with many ancient buildings and monuments. In 1968, Middle Street was the first conservation area in Kent. The coast of France is approximately 25 miles (40 km) from the town and is visible on clear days. Deal Castle is a device fort commissioned by then-King, Henry VIII.

== History ==
Deal is first mentioned as a village in the Domesday Book of 1086, where it appears as Addelam. It is referred to as Dela in 1158, and Dale in 1275. The name is the Old English dael meaning 'valley', cognate with the modern English 'dale'. Deal developed into a port by the end of the 13th century. In 1495, the town was the site of an attempted landing by the pretender to the English throne Perkin Warbeck. His supporters were driven off by locals loyal to Henry VII at the Battle of Deal, fought on the beach. Sandown, Deal and Walmer castles were constructed around the town by Henry VIII to protect against foreign naval attack.

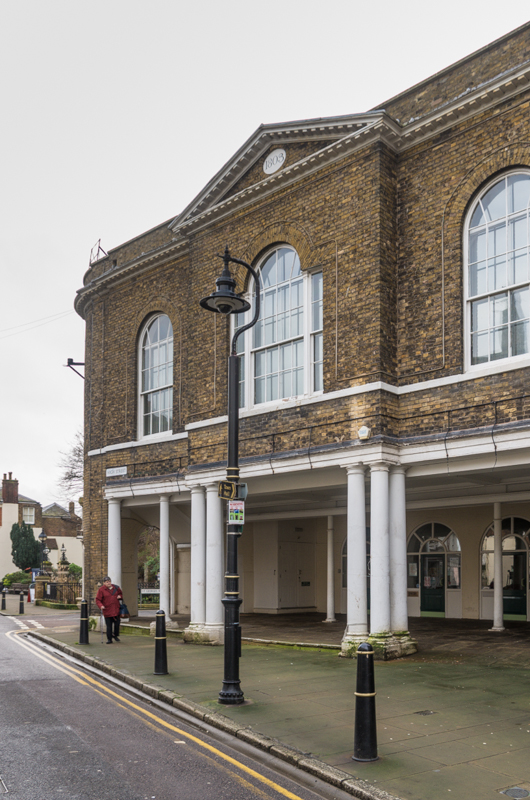
Deal Town Hall

In 1699 the inhabitants petitioned for incorporation, since previously the town had been under the jurisdiction of Sandwich and governed by a deputy appointed by the mayor of that town; William III by his charter incorporated the town under the title of mayor, jurats and commonalty of Deal. Deal Town Hall, the former meeting place of Deal Borough Council, was completed in 1803.

In the Second World War, 12 people were killed by shelling, from 120 shells.

In 1861, the Royal Marine Depot was established in the town. In 1989, it was bombed by the Provisional Irish Republican Army, killing 11 bandsmen.

=== Maritime history ===
The proximity of Deal's shoreline to the Goodwin Sands has made its coastal waters a source of both shelter and danger through the history of sea travel in British waters. The Downs, the water between the town and the sands, provides a naturally sheltered anchorage. Positioned at the eastern end of the English Channel, this is where sailing vessels would wait for a favourable wind, either to proceed into the North Sea, or, heading to the west, down the Channel. Ships going from London (the largest port in the world for much of the age of sail) to the Channel would leave under a fair wind (largely westerly), would turn south past the North Foreland and then find the same wind to be against them to go any further. (The reverse is true for ships heading for London from the Channel: a westerly wind prevents the last part of their journey.) It was common to find one or two hundred ships waiting for a slight change in wind direction that would allow them to proceed; at times, three hundred or more ships could be windbound in the Downs. When a useful wind shift occurred, those in the anchorage would be hastily weighing anchor and setting sail, whilst some ships heading in the opposite direction might now be entering the Downs to anchor, as the wind had turned against them.

When the port of Sandwich silted up, the only way to provide ships in the Downs with fresh provisions, stores and equipment was in boats launched directly from the beach. This was an extensive trade for Deal, and lasted until steam ships took over from sail. Deal also provided a convenient landing place for passengers for London, potentially saving a long wait for a fair wind to finish a voyage; it also allowed outward bound ships to be caught up with and joined.

One problem with the Downs was the quality of the holding ground of the anchorage. It consists of chalk, which is not the best material. Hence it was common for ships in the roadstead to drag their anchors in strong winds, especially those from north round to east northeast or from the southeast, as these directions were less sheltered. This provided salvage work as an additional source of income for the town, with many ships being saved by help from the boatmen.

The importance of the Downs started to reduce from the late 1860s, as competition from steamships made speed an important commercial consideration. Sailing ships began to employ tugs to overcome adverse winds. By the 1880s, the only common usage of the anchorage was by small sailing vessels.

Deal was, for example, visited by Lord Nelson and was the first English soil on which James Cook set foot in 1771 on returning from his first voyage to Australia. The anchorage is still used today by international and regional shipping, though on a scale far smaller than in former times (some historical accounts report hundreds of ships being visible from the beach).

In 1672, a small Naval Yard was established at Deal, providing stores and minor repair facilities. Just outside the gates of the yard there is now a building originally used as a semaphore tower planned to be used as a communication link to the Admiralty in London but converted to a timeball tower, in 1855 and which remains today as a museum.

The Deal Maritime and Local History Museum is housed in an historic complex of light-industrial buildings in St George's Road, dating from 1803. It contains a series of displays and artefacts, narrating the town's maritime, industrial, domestic and leisure history.

==== Boatmen ====
The Deal boatmen were internationally famous for their skilled seamanship and bravery in operating their locally-built craft, launching and recovering from the open beach. Only the severest weather prevented the larger of the working boats from being able to launch. A range of work was done, with provisions and supplies being taken out to ships anchored in the Downs, and the Post Office paying for mail to be taken out or landed. Ballast (in the form of shingle loaded from the beach) would be sold. Passengers were taken to and from moored ships. It was not unusual for a ship in the Downs to lose her anchor – either slipping the cable in an emergency or if a cable or anchor chain parted, thereby providing two sources of work for the boatmen.

First, the Downs had to be kept as clear as possible of the obstruction that lost gear presented, otherwise the anchors of other ships could become entangled in them and prevent weighing. In 1607, two boatmen were awarded £30 a year for sweeping for and recovering lost anchors, with substantial numbers being salvaged. In the three years from 1866, over 600 anchors were swept up from the Downs – at that time the Board of Trade paid for this to be done.

Secondly, a ship that had lost her anchor would need to replace it. A large store of ground tackle of every size was kept by the boatmen, from which a suitable example could be loaded into one of the larger luggers and taken out and sold to the ship which needed it. In ordinary weather, this charge would be the fair cost of the gear sold. In severe weather, provision of an anchor would be classed as salvage, since it often prevented the loss of the ship. After the Merchant Shipping Act 1854, the salvage claims became more fairly assessed than in prior years and substantial payments could be made to boatmen who launched into strong winds to provide this service. In November 1859, in 12 days 30 anchors and chains were supplied to ships in the Downs, 17 of them in one day. The lugger Albion earnt the most from this: £2,022 8s 6d, with other boats earning several hundred pounds each.

Other salvage work was also done by the boatmen —anything from supplying fresh men to man the pumps of a leaking vessel, to taking cargo off the wrecks of vessels that could not be saved—though with some instances when abandoned vessels aground on the Goodwins were saved, yielding significant awards by the Admiralty court.

An extensive smuggling trade existed from Deal, with a peak of activity in 1737. Special fast galleys (boats primarily propelled by oars) were built and used in calm misty weather, when the Revenue vessels had little chance of catching them. In response to this, in 1784 the government sent a punitive expedition of soldiers to Deal, supported by naval cutters stationed offshore. The boats were all smashed or burnt - so depriving the boatmen of a means to make a living. The resentment at this community punishment was set aside when the Napoleonic wars started, and the many naval vessels anchored in the Downs needed their services.

==== Boats used by boatmen ====
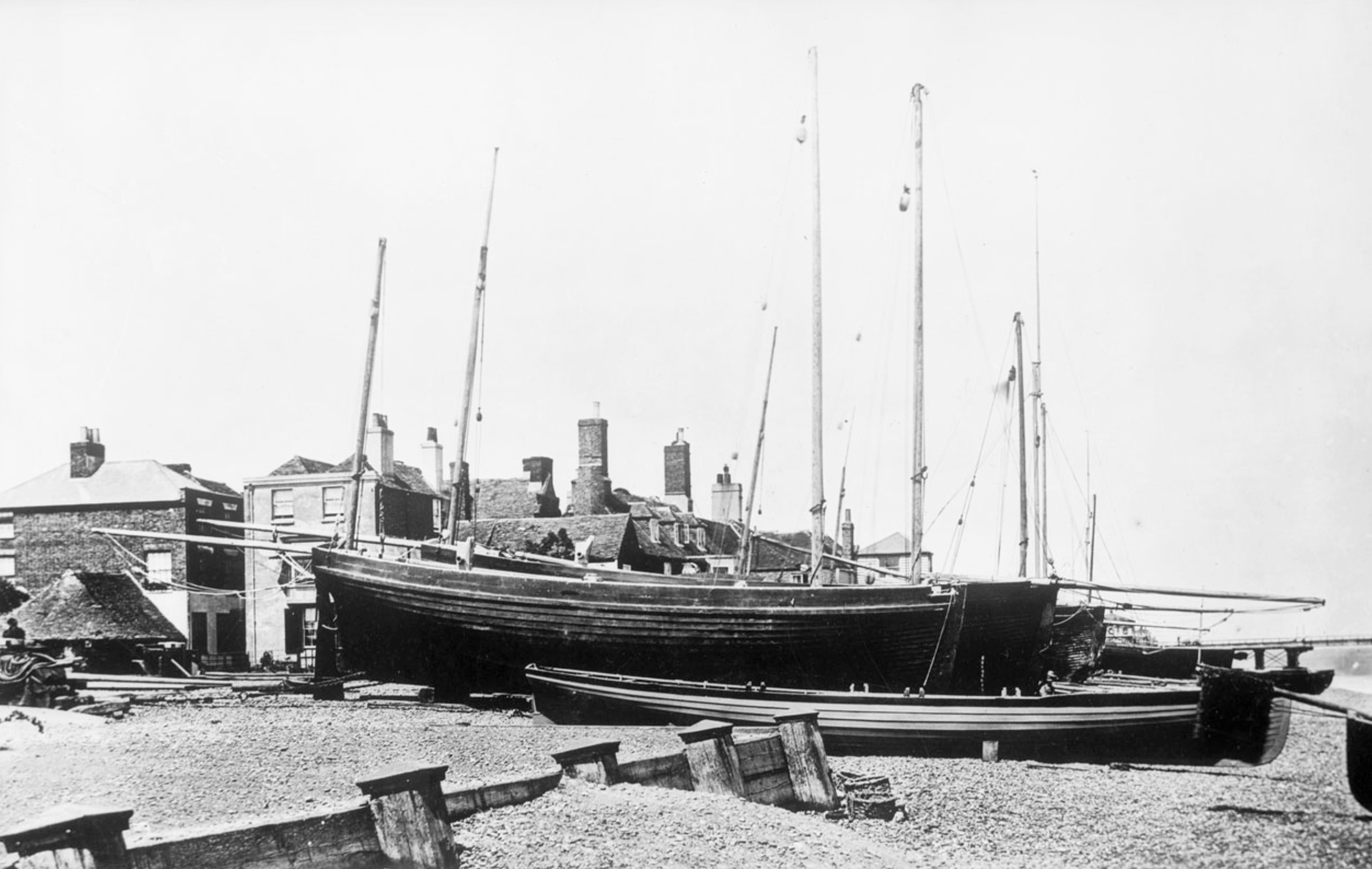
Deal luggers and a 4-oared galley on the beach at Port Arms station in 1866. The luggers are hauled up close to their capstans, where they are held by chains led through special holes in the keel. The galley in the foreground is of the type used for boarding and landing pilots.

In the 19th century there were several types of boat used by the boatmen. The two largest were the Deal luggers. In the early part of the century, these were three-masted vessels, with a dipping lug on the fore and main masts and a standing lug mizzen. A jib was set on a bowsprit and the mizzen sheeted to a long outrigger. The mainmast could be dispensed with to give more working room in the boat or in the winter, so it was common for just two masts to be used. The mainmast ceased to be used altogether in the 1840s. The "first class" luggers (often called "forepeakers") would be up to 38 feet (12 metres) long, with a beam of 12 ft 3 in (3.73 m), carrying six tons of ballast in a hull that weighed three-and-a-half tons. They were clinker built and had an enclosed forepeak in which the crew could shelter or sleep – but otherwise these were undecked, open boats. It was these larger luggers that would carry a replacement anchor out to a ship in the Downs. The smaller luggers were called "cats", able to do most of the work of the larger boats, but instead of the enclosed forepeak they had a removable cabin that could be set up between the thwarts. There were 21 first class luggers operating from Deal in 1833 and 15 cats. In the same year, 54 four or six oared galleys worked from Deal. These were lighter boats of between 21 and 30 ft (6.4 and 9.1 m) in length. They could be sailed as well as rowed, setting a dipping lug on a single mast. They were used for taking passengers out to ships in the Downs and for boarding and landing pilots.

Luggers were launched bows first down the beach by slipping the chain that ran through the "ruffles" (a hole in the back of the keel) and travelled at gathering speed down greased wooden skids laid on the shingle. The intent was to gather enough momentum to get through the first waves encountered as the foresail was hoisted. A haul-off rope, led to an anchor set off-shore, could hold the boat up to the waves as the sail was hoisted and help the boat sheer off on the correct tack. If not enough speed was gained, unless the weather was calm, the boat would probably turn parallel to the beach and be smashed by the waves. At high water, the shorter run to the sea increased the difficulty of getting a good launch, as there was less space in which to pick up speed. When the boat's work was complete, beaching was done by sailing on to the beach in front of the capstan, with a man standing in the sea ready to fasten the capstan rope to the chain strop that went through the front of the keel. For a large lugger it would take 20 or 30 men at the capstan to then haul the boat up the beach and then turn it round ready for the next launch. This was a hazardous task in which men could be killed or injured if control was lost of the large weights being moved.

=== Naval and Military ===
==== The Navy Yard ====
A naval storehouse was built in Deal in 1672, providing for ships anchored in the Downs. In time, the establishment grew to cover some five acres of land, to the north of the castle. There was also a victualling yard on site. In contrast to other naval yards, there was no place for ships to dock alongside at Deal, so instead a number of small supply boats were maintained at the yard; these would be launched from the shingle beach, carrying supplies, provisions, personnel or equipment as required. The Yard closed in 1864.

==== The barracks ====
The Royal Marines Depot was constructed shortly after the outbreak of the French Revolution. The layout originally consisted of adjacent cavalry and infantry barracks (later known as South Barracks), alongside which were separate hospitals for the Army and Navy. In due course the hospitals were also turned into barracks (known as North Barracks and East Barracks respectively). From 1861 the complex served as a sizeable Depot for the Royal Marines; latterly it was known in particular for the Royal Marines School of Music, which had moved there in 1930.

=== Piers ===
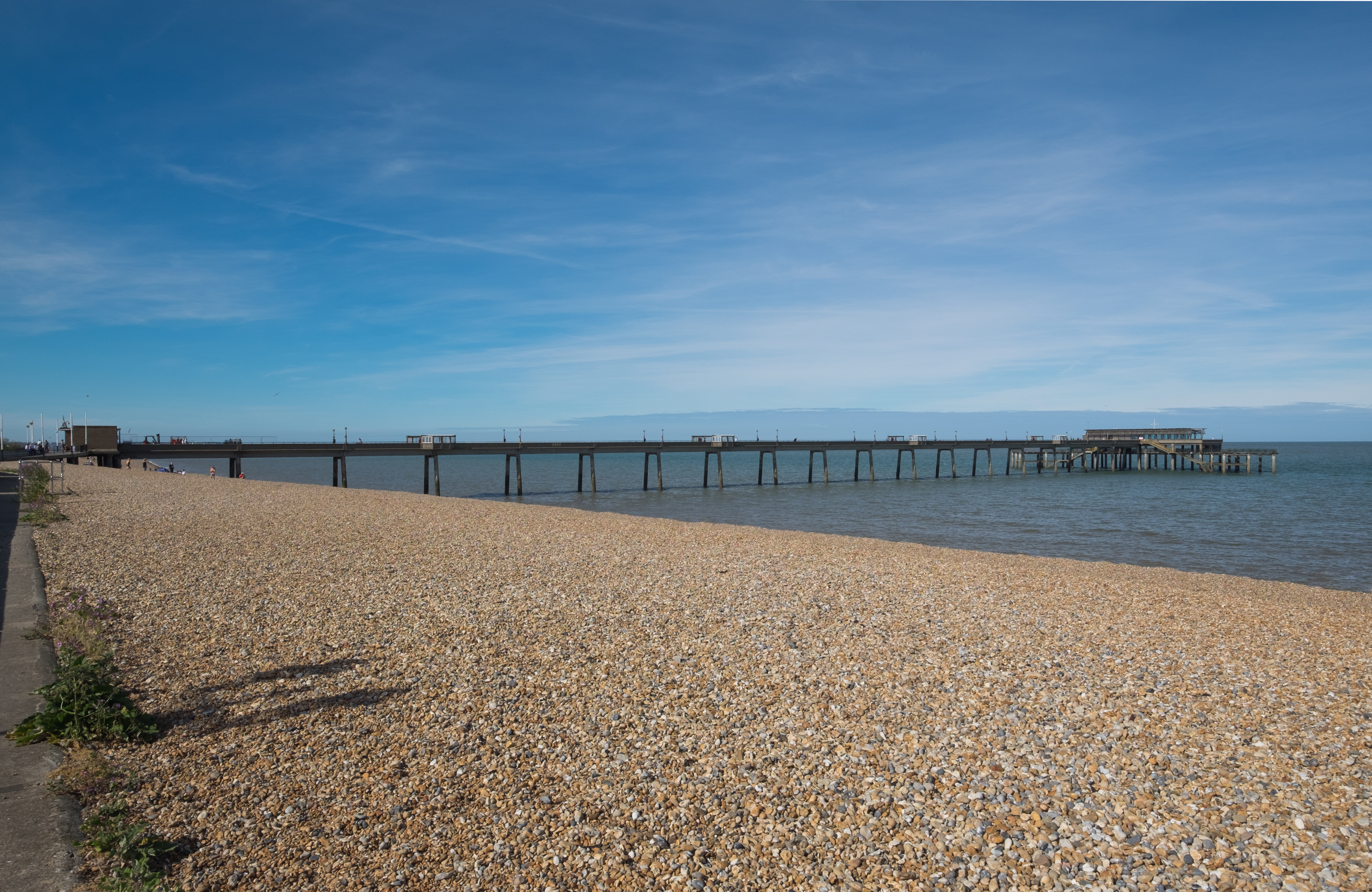
The 1957 Deal Pier

The seafront at Deal has been adorned with three separate piers in the town's history. The first, built in 1838, was designed by Sir John Rennie. After its wooden structure was destroyed in an 1857 gale, it was replaced by an iron pier in 1864. A popular pleasure pier, it survived until the Second World War, when it was struck and severely damaged by a mined Dutch ship, the Nora, in January 1940. This was not the first time the pier had been hit by shipping, with previous impacts in 1873 and 1884 necessitating extensive repairs.

The present pier, designed by Sir W. Halcrow & Partners, was opened on 19 November 1957 by the Duke of Edinburgh. Deal's current pier is the last remaining fully intact leisure pier in Kent and is a Grade II listed building.

=== Museums ===
Deal has several museums; most are related to Deal's maritime history. Both Deal Castle and Walmer Castle are operated by English Heritage – Deal has a display on the events in the reign of Henry VIII that led to the invasion threat which caused its construction, along with some material on its subsequent history, whereas displays at Walmer concentrate on Walmer's post-Tudor role as the Lord Warden's residence. There is also a ruin of the third Tudor castle, Sandown Castle, in North Deal. The Deal Maritime and Local History Museum has exhibits of boats, smuggler galleys and model naval ships. It also contains extensive histories of the lifeboats as well as local parish registers. The Timeball Tower Museum, on the other hand, focuses on the importance of timekeeping for ships, and the role the building it occupies played. Kent Museum of the Moving Image (Kent MOMI) explores the deep history of the moving image — from the days of candle-lit magic lantern performances and hand-painted slides, through Victorian visual experimentation, to the advent and heyday of the cinema.

== Notable references ==
Diarist Samuel Pepys recorded several visits to the town, being moved on 30 April 1660 to describe it as "pitiful".

The author Daniel Defoe controversially wrote of the town in his 1704 book The Storm. The town accused him of libel and refuted the allegations he made. Defoe wrote:

If I had any satire left to write,
Could I with suited spleen indite,
My verse should blast that fatal town,
And drown'd sailors' widows pull it down;
No footsteps of it should appear,
And ships no more cast anchor there.
The barbarous hated name of Deal shou'd die,
Or be a term of infamy;
And till that's done, the town will stand
A just reproach to all the land

William Cobbett passing through in September 1823 noted in his book Rural Rides:

Deal is a most villainous place. It is full of filthy-looking people. Great desolation of abomination has been going on here; tremendous barracks, partly pulled down and partly tumbling down, and partly occupied by soldiers. Everything seems upon the perish. I was glad to hurry along through it, and to leave its inns and public-houses to be occupied by the tarred, and trowsered, and blue and buff crew whose very vicinage I always detest.

=== In fiction ===
Dickens, who had visited the town, had Richard Carstone garrisoned here in Bleak House, so that Woodcourt and Esther's paths can cross when Woodcourt's ship happens to anchor in the Downs at the same time as Esther and Charley are visiting Richard:

At last we came into the narrow streets of Deal, and very gloomy they were upon a raw misty morning. The long flat beach, with its little irregular houses, wooden and brick, and its litter of capstans, and great boats, and sheds, and bare upright poles with tackle and blocks, and loose gravelly waste places overgrown with grass and weeds, wore as dull an appearance as any place I ever saw.

In Jane Austen's Persuasion, the town is mentioned as the only place where Admiral Croft's wife Sophia Croft was ever ill, as it was the only place she was ever separated from him, whilst he was patrolling the North Sea.

- It is the setting for David Donachie's book A Hanging Matter, a murder and nautical mystery.
- North & South Deal were swapped round in the semi-autobiographical novel The Pier by Rayner Heppenstall.
- Deal features briefly in H. G. Wells The War of the Worlds.
- Deal is mentioned as the destination for a Marine recruit from Edinburgh in the novel Guns of Evening by Ronald Bassett. "What's Deal?", the recruit replies, having never heard of it.
- Deal is the setting for Ian Fleming's 1955 James Bond book Moonraker. Villain Hugo Drax has built his Moonraker rocket just outside Deal, where Bond has to go and investigate.
- Characters in the Aubrey–Maturin novels of Patrick O'Brian frequently stay in Deal waiting for their ship to be ordered to sea.
- Horatio Hornblower (in The Commodore, by C. S. Forester) departs from Deal on his voyage to the Baltic.
- Deal features in Anthony Horowitz's 2017 crime thriller The Word Is Murder.
- It is the setting for GJ Kelly's historical thriller Considerable Advantage.
- Deal is the setting for local novelist George Chittenden's smuggling saga, which is set in the late 18th century when the town was a haven for criminal gangs smuggling contraband across the English Channel. In Chittenden's debut The Boy Who Led Them a child rises through the ranks to control the biggest smuggling gang on the Kent coast, fighting wars with rival gangs and revenue men at every turn. In Chittenden's next book, The Boy Who Felt No Pain, he takes the reader on a journey back to the dangerous coastal town of Deal, fleshing out the back story of main characters from the first novel whilst also raising some interesting new questions.
- A renamed Deal served as the setting for the William Horwood book The Boy With No Shoes. It is also the setting for part of his earlier novel The Stonor Eagles.
- It is the (renamed) setting of Frances Fyfield's crime novel Undercurrents.

== Local media ==
=== Newspapers ===
Deal has one paid-for newspaper, the East Kent Mercury, published by the KM Group.

=== Radio ===
Deal is served by the award winning internet radio station DR (Deal Radio).

Deal is also served by the county-wide stations Heart South, Gold, KMFM and BBC Radio Kent. DCR 104.9FM (Dover Community Radio) the community radio station for Deal, Dover and Sandwich started broadcasting on 104.9FM in May 2022. The online station of the same name launched on 30 July 2011 offering local programmes, music and news for Dover and district. Prior to this DCR was a podcasting service founded in 2010. DCR was awarded a community radio licence by OFCOM on 12 May 2020.

=== Television ===
Local news and television programmes are provided by BBC South East and ITV Meridian from the Dover transmitting station.

== Transport ==
The town is served by Deal railway station on the Kent Coast Line, run by Southeastern, with services running to and from London St Pancras International and Ramsgate, with peak services to London Charing Cross via Tonbridge.

== Sport and leisure ==
Deal has a non-League football club Deal Town, which plays at The Charles Sports Ground.

The rugby club, Deal & Betteshanger Lions, plays at the old RM Drill Field off Canada Road.

Deal Walmer & Kingsdown Amateur Rowing Club is located on the seafront north of the pier.

Royal Cinque Ports Golf Club is located immediately north of the town and is a renowned championship links course. The club was founded in February 1892 and the course opened later that year. In 1909, the club was the venue for the Open Championship, which was won by Englishman J H Taylor. The club also hosted the 1920 Open Championship and 1923 Amateur Championship. The club had been due to host further Open Championships in the 1930s and 1940s, however the Second World War and flooding damage meant all these championships were cancelled or relocated to other venues. The HRH Price of Wales (later Edward VII) was a frequent visitor and was the club's president 1905-1907, he bestowed the royal patronage on the club.

There is a farmer's market on Wednesday which sells local produce, as well as a long-running market on Saturday. The town has an independent retail sector in the North End of Deal High Street, and a number of chains on the High Street, though there are some retail voids.

The Lighthouse Music & Arts Venue offers live music and arts events.

The Astor Theatre in Deal offers musical performances, live theatre, exhibitions, films, classes and clubs. Across the road from the Astor Theatre is the Kent Museum of the Moving Image, created by David Francis, with his wife Jocelyn Marsh (daughter of award-winning production designer Terence Marsh). The 'Kent MOMI' features three exhibitions focused on early Moving Image History, Vinten Cameras and the work of Ealing Studios.

== Twin towns ==
Deal is twinned with Saint-Omer, France.

== Notable people ==
- William Boys (1735–1803), an English surgeon and topographer.
- Admiral Sir John Harvey (1772 in Eastry – 1837 in Upper Deal), officer of the British Royal Navy during the French Revolutionary and Napoleonic Wars.
- Antonio Blitz (1810 in Deal – 1877), magician, who worked mainly in Europe and the United States.
- John Hulke (1830 in Deal – 1895), surgeon, geologist and fossil collector, and son of a physician in Deal.
- Freddy McConnell, multimedia journalist for The Guardian and trans man
- Edward Millen (1860 in Deal – 1923), Australian journalist and politician, the first Minister for Repatriation
- Alan Patterson (1886 in Deal – 1916), track and field athlete. He competed at the 1908 Summer Olympics in London and at the 1912 Summer Olympics in Stockholm.
- Captain John William Pinder (1898 in Deal ), British First World War flying ace
- Carole White (born in Deal in 1950), former model and co-founder of Premier Model Management, but raised in Ghana
- James Arbuthnot, Baron Arbuthnot of Edrom (born in Deal in 1952), Conservative Party politician. He last served as MP for North East Hampshire from 1997 to 2015.
- Linda Ann Martin (born 1954 in Deal), fencer. She competed in the women's individual and team foil events at the 1980, 1984 and 1988 Summer Olympics.
- Richard Ovenden (born 25 March 1964), librarian, author, and current Bodley's Librarian in the University of Oxford
- Stephen Chidwick (born 10 May 1989), professional poker player.

=== Actors ===
- Charles Hawtrey (1914–1988), comedy actor and musician. He moved to Deal in 1968 and lived at 117 Middle St.
- Sir Norman Joseph Wisdom (1915–2010), actor, comedian and singer-songwriter. He lived for a period in a children's home in Deal, but ran away when he was 11. A JD Wetherspoon public house in Queens Street is named after him.
- Bruce Montague (1939 in Deal –2022), actor, best known for his role as Leonard Dunn in the television sitcom Butterflies
- Richard Cant (born in Dartford in 1964), actor, best known for his roles in the ITV1 television series Midsomer Murders
- Neil Stuke (born 1966 in Dover), actor best known for his role of Matthew in the TV sitcom Game On and more recently for playing Billy Lamb in the BBC legal drama Silk
- Jack Scanlon (born 1998), actor and musician, best known for his role in the Holocaust film The Boy in the Striped Pyjamas (2008). He lives in Deal with his parents and younger brother.
- Hywel Bennett (1944–2017), film and TV actor, best known for playing lead role in the TV series Shelley
- Bernard Hepton (1925–2018), film and TV actor, best known for his role in the TV series Secret Army
- Geoff Bell (born 1963 in London), film and TV actor, notable for his performances in Green Street, The Business, Kingsman: The Secret Service, Suffragette, War Horse and King Arthur

=== Musicians ===
- Edward Francis Fitzwilliam (1824 in Deal – 1857), composer and music director
- John Ireland (1879–1962), English composer and teacher of classical music. He lived at Comarques, 122, High Street, Deal, from 1936 to 1939.
- Nigel Rogers (1935–2022), tenor
- John Tilbury (1936), pianist. Member of the free improvisation group AMM.
- Dick Morrissey (1940–2000 in Deal), jazz musician and composer. He played the tenor sax, soprano sax and flute.
- Adrian Brett (born in Deal in 1945), flautist; his album, Echoes of Gold, appeared in the Top 20 of the UK Albums Chart.

=== Writers ===
- Elizabeth Carter (1717 in Deal – 1806), poet, classicist, writer and translator, and a member of the Bluestocking Circle around Elizabeth Montagu
- Stephen Phillips (1864–1915 in Deal), poet and dramatist. Popular early in his career, he lodged and died in Deal.
- A. M. Irvine (1866-1950), author, lived much of her adult life in Deal and died there.
- Nathaniel Gubbins (1893–1976), journalist and humourist, known as The War's Leading Humorist. He lived at 109 Beach Street from 1947 to 195.
- Elizabeth Bartlett (1924 in Deal – 2008), poet
- William Horwood (born 1944), novelist. He grew up on the East Kent coast, primarily in Deal.
- Sean Gabb (born 1960 in Chatham), writer, lecturer and broadcaster. Director of the Libertarian Alliance from 2006 to 2017. He lives in Deal.
- Charlie Connelly (born 1970 in London), author and broadcaster
- Alexander James Kent (born 1977 in Dover), cartographer, geographer and academic, and co-author of The Red Atlas. President of the British Cartographic Society from 2015 to 2017 and lives in Deal.
- Gregory Motton (born 1961), playwright, author and film director. He lives in Deal.

== Climate ==
The nearest UK Met Office weather station is in Langdon Bay. Deal has a temperate maritime climate, with comfortable summers and cold winters. The temperature is usually between 3 °C (37 °F) and 21.1 °C (70.0 °F), but the all-time temperature range is between −8 °C (18 °F) and 31 °C (88 °F). There is evidence that the sea is coldest in February; the warmest recorded February temperature was only 13 °C (55 °F), compared with 16 °C (61 °F) in January.

== In popular culture ==
Author Russell Hoban repurposes Deal as "Good Shoar" in his 1980, post apocalyptic novel Riddley Walker.

== See also ==
- Listed buildings in Deal, Kent

== Sources ==
- Green, Ivan. The Book of Deal and Walmer, Barracuda Books Ltd, 1983, ISBN 0-86023-156-9
