= David Francis (film archivist) =

British film archivist

David Francis OBE
- Born: David John Francis; 1935 (age 90–91)
- Occupation: Film archivist

David John Francis OBE (born 1935) is a British film archivist. He was the second curator of the UK's National Film and Television Archive from 1974 until 1989, when he was succeeded by Clyde Jeavons. Francis went on to become the Chief of the Motion Picture, Broadcasting and Recorded Sound Division at the Library of Congress (November 1991 - February 2001).

== Works ==
- Usai, Paolo Cherchi; Francis, David; Horwath, Alexander; et al., eds. (October 2008). Film Curatorship: Archives, Museums and the Digital Marketplace. Austrian Film Museum. ISBN 978-3-901644-24-5.
- Francis, David (15 April 2009). "Motion Picture Conservation at the Library of Congress". Motion Picture & Television Reading Room - Library of Congress.
- Francis, David; Sobel, Raoul (1977). Chaplin: Genesis of a Clown. Quartet Books. ISBN 0-7043-2105-X.

During the 1980s he was the leading academic member of the team that created London's internationally acclaimed Museum of the Moving Image (MOMI).

In 2018 he opened the Kent Museum of the Moving Image with his wife Jocelyn Marsh.

== Awards and honors ==
In 1990, Francis was made both a Fellow of the British Kinematograph, Sound and Television Society and a Fellow of the British Film Institute for his work in film and television preservation. He was appointed an Officer of the Order of the British Empire by Queen Elizabeth II for his contributions to film archiving and for his work on the Getty Center in the 1986 Birthday Honours.

In 1994 Francis was awarded the Premio Jean Mitry by the organisers of the Giornate del cinema muto, the Pordenone-based festival devoted to silent cinema.

He has been an Honorary Member of the International Federation of Film Archives since 2001.

Francis was the 2002 recipient of the Mel Novikoff Award at the San Francisco International Film Festival.

In 2004, Francis won the Silver Light Award from the Association of Moving Image Archivists.
