= All roads lead to Rome (disambiguation) =

"All roads lead to Rome" is a proverb meaning the same outcome can be reached in multiple different ways. The term may also refer to:

- All Roads Lead to Rome (1949 film), a French film
- All Roads Lead to Rome (2015 film), an American romantic comedy film
- "All Roads Lead to Rome", an episode of the 2012 documentary Meet the Romans with Mary Beard
- "All Roads Lead to Rome", an episode of the 1965 Doctor Who serial The Romans
- "All Roads Lead to Rome", a song by the Stranglers on the 1983 album Feline
