= Roman triumph =

Ancient Roman ceremony of military success

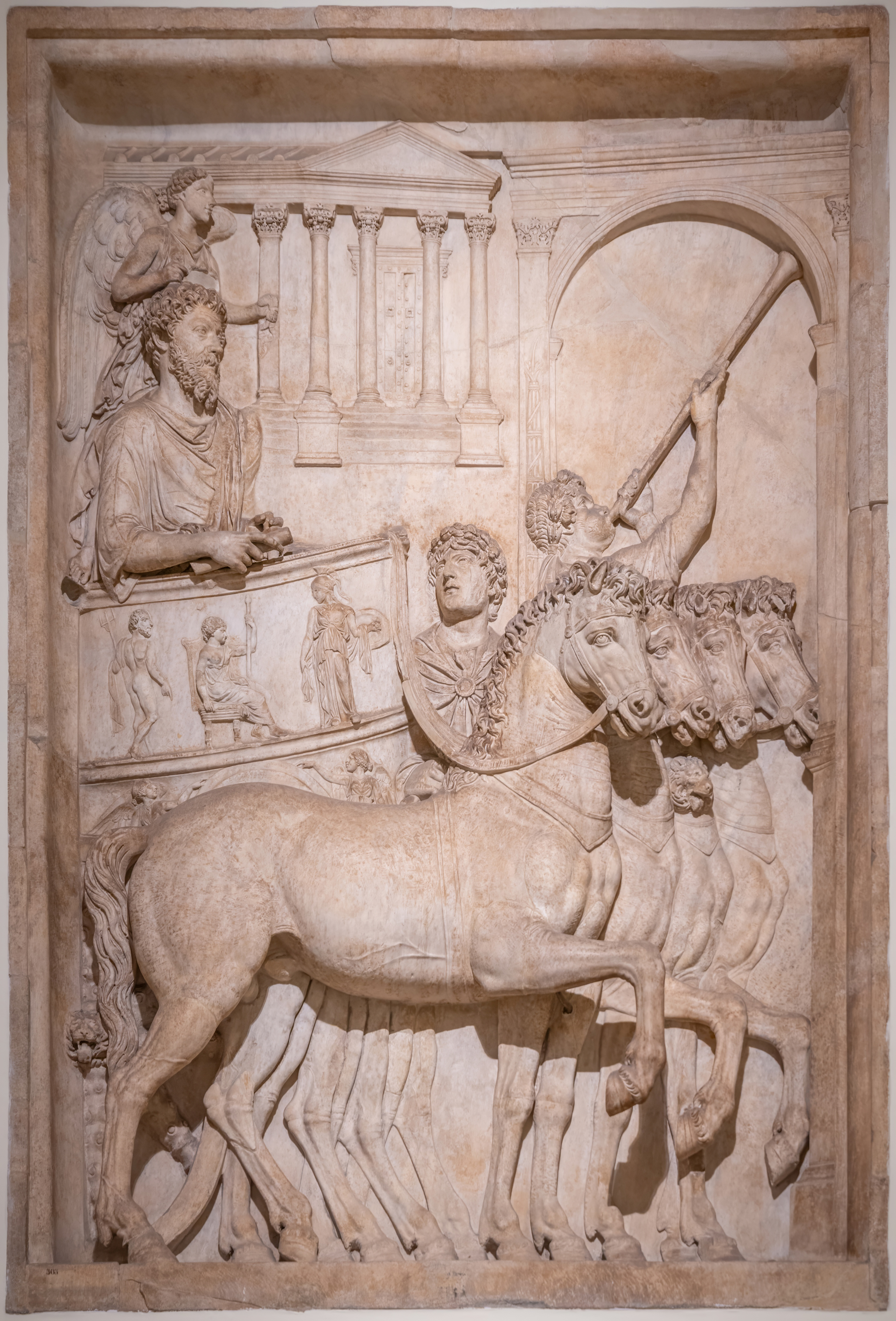
Panel from a representation of a triumph of the Emperor Marcus Aurelius; a winged genius hovers above his head

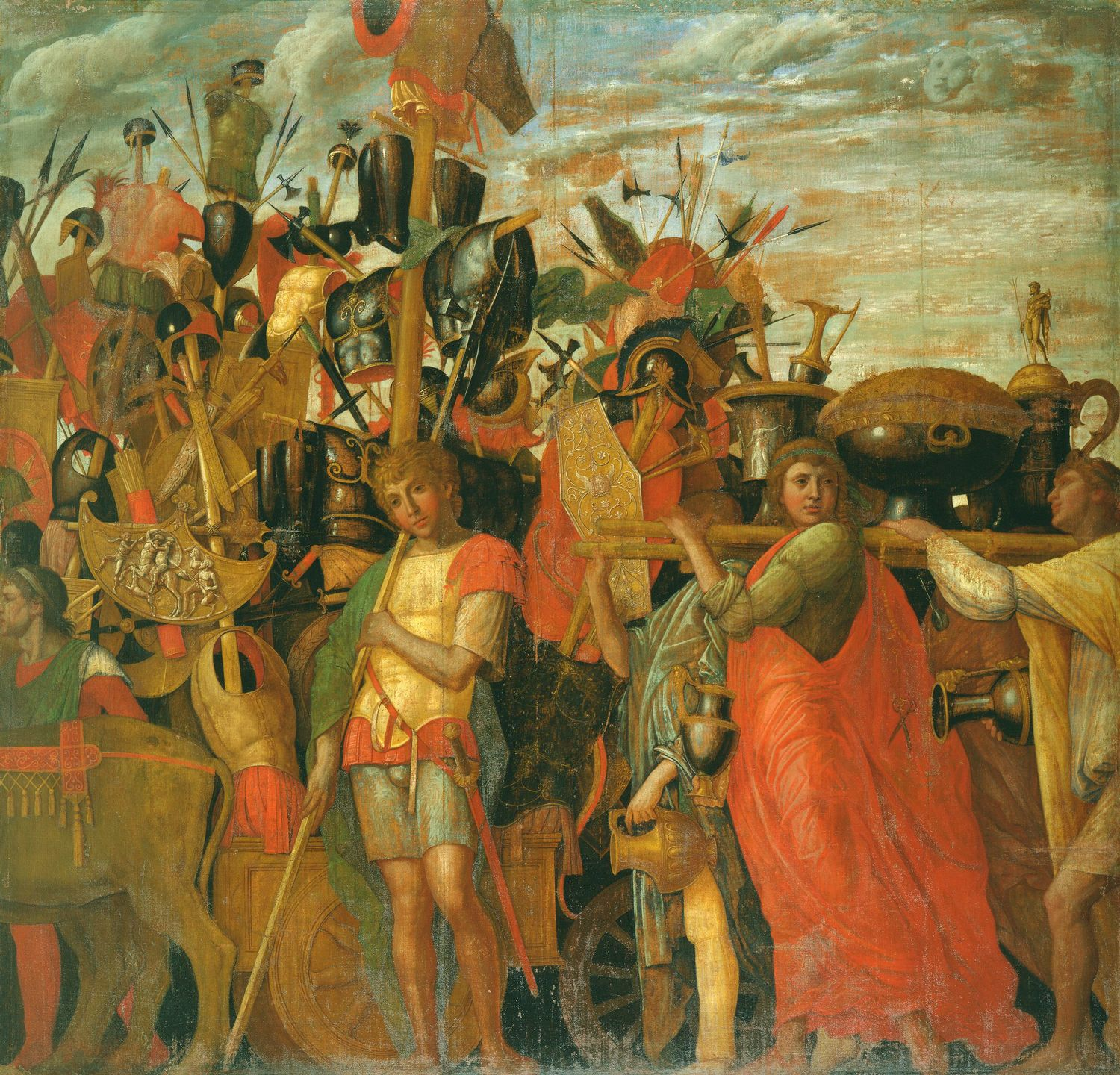
Scene from the Triumphs of Caesar by Andrea Mantegna (1482–94, Royal Collection)

The Roman triumph (triumphus) was a civil ceremony and religious rite of ancient Rome, held to publicly celebrate and sanctify the success of a military commander who had led Roman forces to victory in the service of the state or, in some historical traditions, one who had successfully completed a foreign war.

On the day of his triumph, the general wore a crown of laurel and an all-purple, gold-embroidered triumphal toga picta ("painted" toga), regalia that identified him as near-divine or near-kingly. In some accounts, his face was painted red, perhaps in imitation of Rome's highest and most powerful god, Jupiter. The general rode in a four-horse chariot through the streets of Rome in unarmed procession with his army, captives, and the spoils of his war. At Jupiter's temple on the Capitoline Hill, he offered sacrifice and the tokens of his victory to Jupiter.

In Republican tradition, only the Senate could grant a triumph. The origins and development of this honour are obscure: Roman historians themselves placed the first triumph in the mythic past. Republican morality required that the general conduct himself with dignified humility, as a mortal citizen who triumphed on behalf of Rome's Senate, people, and gods. Inevitably, the triumph offered the general extraordinary opportunities for self-publicity, besides its religious and military dimensions. Most triumphal celebrations included a range of popular games and entertainments for the Roman masses.

Most Roman festivals were calendar fixtures, tied to the worship of particular deities. While the triumphal procession culminated at Jupiter's temple on the far end of the Via Sacra (sacred road) in the Roman Forum, the procession itself, attendant feasting, and public games promoted the general's status and achievement. By the Late Republican era, triumphs were drawn out and extravagant, motivated by increasing competition among the military-political adventurers who ran Rome's nascent empire. Some triumphs were prolonged by several days of public games and entertainments. From the Principate onwards, the triumph reflected the Imperial order and the pre-eminence of the Imperial family. The triumph was consciously imitated by medieval and later states in the royal entry and other ceremonial events.

== Background and ceremonies ==
=== Vir triumphalis ===
In Republican Rome, truly exceptional military achievement merited the highest possible honours, which connected the vir triumphalis ("man of triumph", later known as a triumphator) to Rome's mythical and semi-mythical past. In effect, the general was close to being "king for a day", and possibly close to divinity. He wore the regalia traditionally associated both with the ancient Roman monarchy and with the statue of Jupiter Capitolinus: the purple and gold "toga picta", laurel crown, red boots and, again possibly, the red-painted face of Rome's supreme deity. He was drawn in procession through the city in a four-horse chariot, under the gaze of his peers and an applauding crowd, to the temple of Capitoline Jupiter. His spoils and captives led the way; his armies followed behind. Once at the Capitoline temple, he sacrificed two white oxen to Jupiter, and laid tokens of victory at the feet of Jupiter's statue, thus dedicating the triumph to the Roman Senate, people, and gods.

Triumphs were tied to no particular day, season, or religious festival of the Roman calendar. Most seem to have been celebrated at the earliest practicable opportunity, probably on days that were deemed auspicious for the occasion. Tradition required that, for the duration of a triumph, every temple was open. The ceremony was thus, in some sense, shared by the whole community of Roman gods, but overlaps were inevitable with specific festivals and anniversaries. Some may have been coincidental; others were designed. For example, March 1, the festival and dies natalis of the war god Mars, was the traditional anniversary of the first triumph by Publicola (504 BCE), of six other Republican triumphs, and of the very first Roman triumph by Romulus. Pompey postponed his third and most magnificent triumph for several months to make it coincide with his own dies natalis (birthday).

Religious dimensions aside, the focus of the triumph was the general himself. The ceremony promoted him – however temporarily – above every mortal Roman. This was an opportunity granted to very few. From the time of Scipio Africanus, the triumphal general was linked (at least for historians during the Principate) to Alexander and the demi-god Hercules, who had laboured selflessly for the benefit of all mankind. His sumptuous triumphal chariot was bedecked with charms against the possible envy (invidia) and malice of onlookers. In some accounts, a companion or public slave would remind him from time to time of his own mortality (a memento mori).

=== Procession ===
Rome's earliest "triumphs" were probably simple victory parades, celebrating the return of a victorious general and his army to the city, along with the fruits of his victory, and ending with some form of dedication to the gods. This is probably so for the earliest legendary and later semi-legendary triumphs of Rome's regal era, when the king functioned as Rome's highest magistrate and war-leader. As Rome's population, power, influence, and territory increased, so did the scale, length, variety, and extravagance of its triumphal processions.

The procession (pompa) mustered in the open space of the Campus Martius (Field of Mars) probably well before first light. From there, all unforeseen delays and accidents aside, it would have managed a slow walking pace at best, punctuated by various planned stops en route to its final destination of the Capitoline temple, a distance of just under 4 km (2.48 mi). Triumphal processions were notoriously long and slow; the longest could last for two or three days, and possibly more, and some may have been of greater length than the route itself.

Some ancient and modern sources suggest a fairly standard processional order. First came the captive leaders, allies, and soldiers (and sometimes their families) usually walking in chains; some were destined for execution or further display. Their captured weapons, armour, gold, silver, statuary, and curious or exotic treasures were carted behind them, along with paintings, tableaux, and models depicting significant places and episodes of the war. Next in line, all on foot, came Rome's senators and magistrates, followed by the general's lictors in their red war-robes, their fasces wreathed in laurel, then the general in his four-horse chariot. A companion, or a public slave, might share the chariot with him or, in some cases, his youngest children. His officers and elder sons rode horseback nearby. His unarmed soldiers followed in togas and laurel crowns, chanting "io triumphe!" and singing ribald songs at their general's expense. Somewhere in the procession, two flawless white oxen were led for the sacrifice to Jupiter, garland-decked and with gilded horns. All this was done to the accompaniment of music, clouds of incense, and the strewing of flowers.

Almost nothing is known of the procession's infrastructure and management. Its doubtless enormous cost was defrayed in part by the state but mostly by the general's loot, which most ancient sources dwell on in great detail and unlikely superlatives. Once disposed, this portable wealth injected huge sums into the Roman economy; the amount brought in by Octavian's triumph over Egypt triggered a fall in interest rates and a sharp rise in land prices. No ancient source addresses the logistics of the procession: where the soldiers and captives, in a procession of several days, could have slept and eaten, or where these several thousands plus the spectators could have been stationed for the final ceremony at the Capitoline temple.

=== Route ===
The following schematic is for the route taken by "some, or many" triumphs, and is based on standard modern reconstructions. Any original or traditional route would have been diverted to some extent by the city's many redevelopments and re-building, or sometimes by choice. The starting place (the Campus Martius) lay outside the city's sacred boundary (pomerium), bordering the eastern bank of the Tiber. The procession entered the city through a Porta Triumphalis (Triumphal Gate), and crossed the pomerium, where the general surrendered his command to the senate and magistrates. It continued through the site of the Circus Flaminius, skirting the southern base of the Capitoline Hill and the Velabrum, along a Via Triumphalis (Triumphal Way) towards the Circus Maximus, perhaps dropping off any prisoners destined for execution at the Tullianum. It entered the Via Sacra then the Forum. Finally, it ascended the Capitoline Hill to the Temple of Jupiter Capitolinus. Once the sacrifice and dedications were completed, the procession and spectators dispersed to banquets, games, and other entertainments sponsored by the triumphing general.

=== Banquets, games, and entertainments ===
In most triumphs, the general funded any post-procession banquets from his share of the loot. There were feasts for the people and separate, much richer feasts for the elite; some went on for most of the night. Dionysius offers a contrast to the lavish triumphal banquets of his time by giving Romulus's triumph the most primitive possible "banquet" – ordinary Romans setting up food-tables as a "welcome home", and the returning troops taking swigs and bites as they marched by. He recreates the first Republican triumphal banquet along the same lines. Varro claims that his aunt earned 20,000 sesterces by supplying 5,000 thrushes for Caecilius Metellus's triumph of 71 BCE.

Some triumphs included ludi as fulfillment of the general's vow to a god or goddess, made before battle or during its heat, in return for their help in securing victory. In the Republic, they were paid for by the triumphing general. Marcus Fulvius Nobilior vowed ludi in return for victory over the Aetolian League and paid for ten days of games at his triumph.

=== Commemoration ===
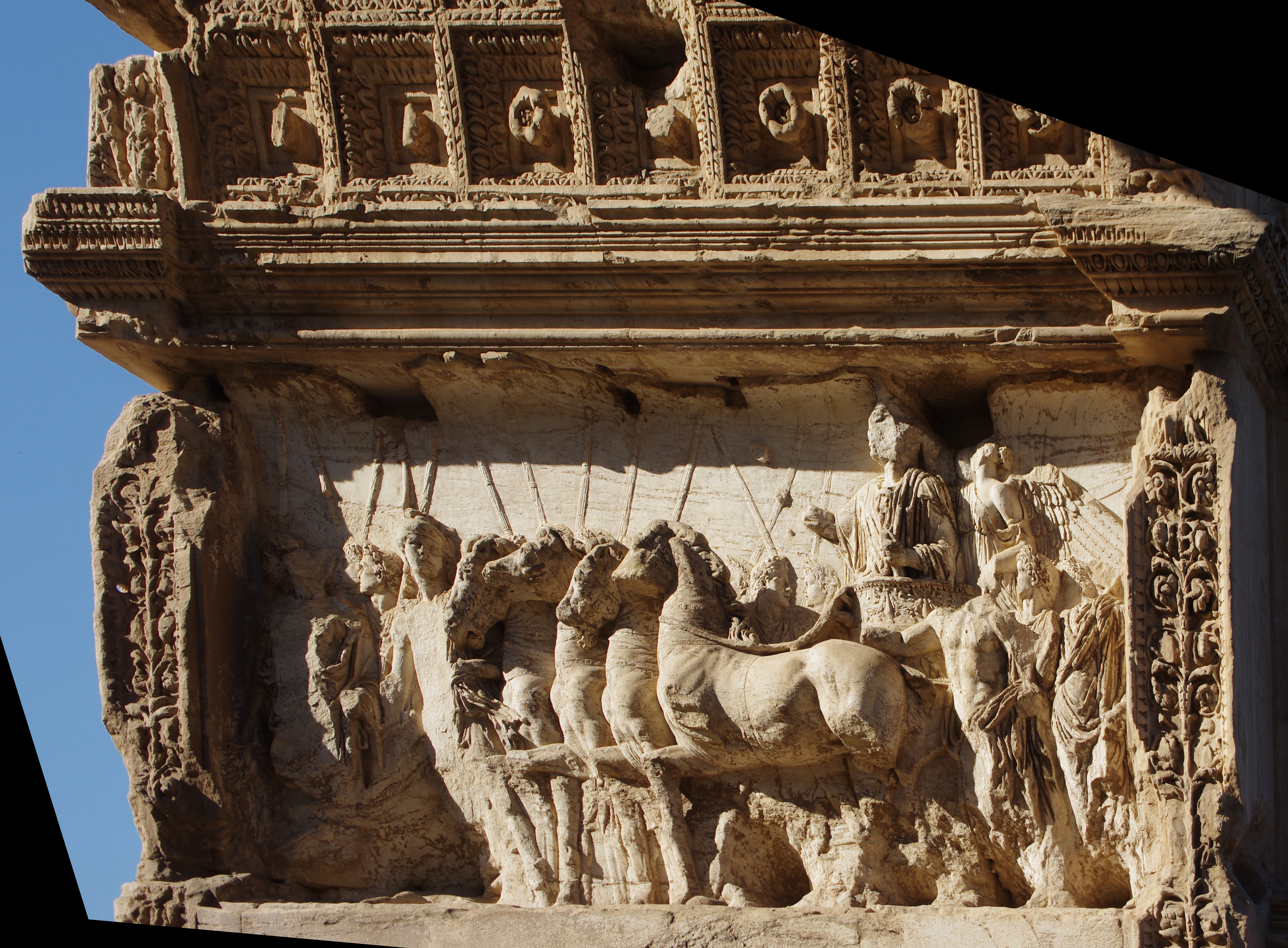
Detail from the Arch of Titus showing Titus as triumphator

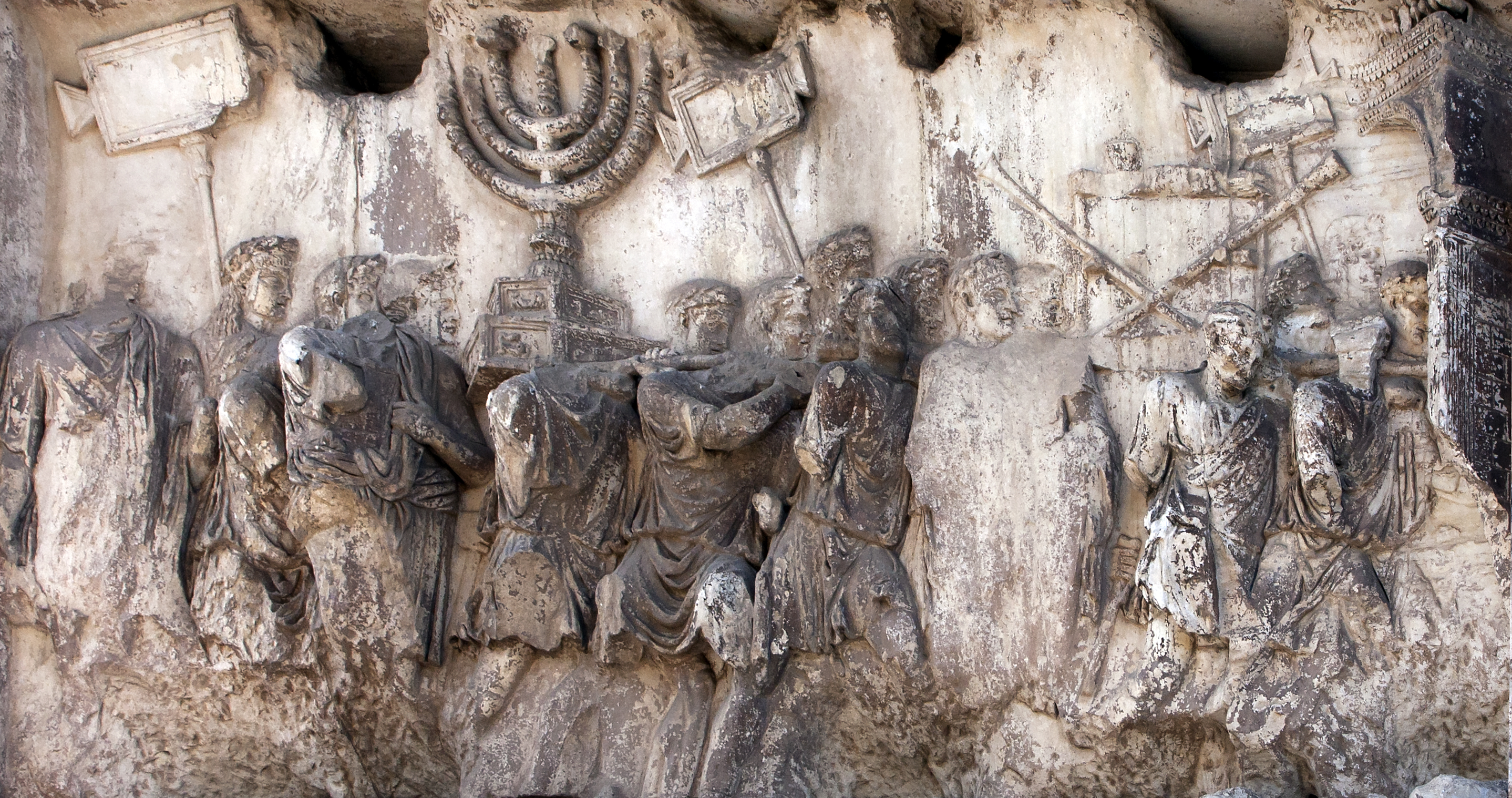
Detail from the Arch of Titus showing his triumph held in 71 for his Sack of Jerusalem

Most Romans would never have seen a triumph, but its symbolism permeated Roman imagination and material culture. Triumphal generals minted and circulated characteristically detailed, high value coins to propagate their triumphal fame and generosity empire-wide. Pompey's issues for his three triumphs are typical. One is an aureus (a gold coin) that has a laurel-wreathed border enclosing a head which personifies Africa; beside it, Pompey's title "Magnus" ("The Great"), with wand and jug as symbols of his augury. The reverse identifies him as proconsul in a triumphal chariot attended by Victory. A triumphal denarius (a silver coin) shows his three trophies of captured arms, with his augur's wand and jug. Another shows a globe surrounded by triumphal wreaths, symbolising his "world conquest", and an ear of grain to show that his victory protected Rome's grain supply. A notable coin, minted by Lucius Manlius Torquatus, a supporter of Sulla, references Sulla's victory over Mithridates VI of Pontus. This coin depicts a quadriga with Sulla's legend and the general partially visible in his chariot. This established a precedent for the Imperial period, where coins often depicted triumphal arches erected by emperors to commemorate their victories. Germanicus' achievements in Germany in 15–16 CE are depicted on coins showing Tiberius in a quadriga.

In Republican tradition, a general was expected to wear his triumphal regalia only for the day of his triumph; thereafter, they were presumably displayed in the atrium of his family home. As one of the nobility, he was entitled to a particular kind of funeral in which a string of actors walked behind his bier wearing the masks of his ancestors; another actor represented the general himself and his highest achievement in life by wearing his funeral mask, triumphal laurels, and toga picta. Anything more was deeply suspect; Pompey was granted the privilege of wearing his triumphal wreath at the Circus, but he met with a hostile reception. Julius Caesar's penchant for wearing his triumphal regalia "wherever and whenever" was taken as one among many signs of monarchical intentions which, for some, justified his murder. In the Imperial era, emperors wore such regalia to signify their elevated rank and office and to identify themselves with the Roman gods and Imperial order – a central feature of Imperial cult.

The building and dedication of monumental public works offered local, permanent opportunities for triumphal commemoration. In 55 BCE, Pompey inaugurated Rome's first stone-built Theatre as a gift to the people of Rome, funded by his spoils. Its gallery and colonnades doubled as an exhibition space and likely contained statues, paintings, and other trophies carried at his various triumphs. It contained a new temple to Pompey's patron goddess Venus Victrix ("Victorious Venus"); the year before, he had issued a coin which showed her crowned with triumphal laurels. Julius Caesar claimed Venus as both patron and divine ancestress; he funded a new temple to her and dedicated it during his quadruple triumph of 46 BCE. He thus wove his patron goddess and putative ancestress into his triumphal anniversary.

Augustus, Caesar's heir and Rome's first emperor, built a vast triumphal monument on the Greek coast at Actium, overlooking the scene of his decisive sea-battle against Antony and Egypt; the bronze beaks of captured Egyptian warships projected from its seaward wall. Imperial iconography increasingly identified Emperors with the gods, starting with the Augustan reinvention of Rome as a virtual monarchy (the principate). Sculpted panels on the arch of Titus (built by Domitian) celebrate Titus' and Vespasian's joint triumph over the Jews after the siege of Jerusalem, with a triumphal procession of captives and treasures seized from the temple of Jerusalem – some of which funded the building of the Colosseum. Another panel shows the funeral and apotheosis of the deified Titus. Prior to this, the senate voted Titus a triple-arch at the Circus Maximus to celebrate or commemorate the same victory or triumph.

== Awarding a triumph ==
In Republican tradition, only the Senate could grant a triumph. A general who wanted a triumph would dispatch his request and report to the Senate. Officially, triumphs were granted for outstanding military merit; the state paid for the ceremony if this and certain other conditions were met – and these seem to have varied from time to time, and from case to case – or the Senate would pay for the official procession, at least. Most Roman historians rest the outcome on an open Senatorial debate and vote, its legality confirmed by one of the people's assemblies; the senate and people thus controlled the state's coffers and rewarded or curbed its generals. Some triumphs seem to have been granted outright, with minimal debate. Some were turned down but went ahead anyway, with the general's direct appeal to the people over the senate and a promise of public games at his own expense. Others were blocked or granted only after interminable wrangling. Senators and generals alike were politicians, and Roman politics was notorious for its rivalries, shifting alliances, back-room dealings, and overt public bribery. The senate's discussions would likely have hinged on triumphal tradition, precedent, and propriety; less overtly but more anxiously, it would hinge on the extent of the general's political and military powers and popularity, and the possible consequences of supporting or hindering his further career. There is no firm evidence that the Senate applied a prescribed set of "triumphal laws" when making their decisions, Valerius Maximus extrapolated various "triumphal laws" from disputed historic accounts of actual practice. They included one law that the general must have killed at least 5,000 of the enemy in a single battle, and another that he must swear an oath that his account was the truth. No evidence has survived for either of these laws, or any other laws relating to triumphs.

=== Ovation ===
A general might be granted a "lesser triumph", known as an Ovation. He entered the city on foot, minus his troops, in his magistrate's toga and wearing a wreath of Venus' myrtle. In 211 BCE, the Senate turned down Marcus Marcellus' request for a triumph after his victory over the Carthaginians and their Sicilian-Greek allies, apparently because his army was still in Sicily and unable to join him. They offered him instead a thanksgiving (supplicatio) and ovation. The day before it, he celebrated an unofficial triumph on the Alban Mount. His ovation was of triumphal proportions. It included a large painting, showing his siege of Syracuse, the siege engines themselves, captured plate, gold, silver, and royal ornaments, and the statuary and opulent furniture for which Syracuse was famous. Eight elephants were led in the procession, symbols of his victory over the Carthaginians. His Spanish and Syracusan allies led the way wearing golden wreaths; they were granted Roman citizenship and lands in Sicily.

In 71 BCE, Crassus earned an ovation for quashing the Spartacus revolt, and increased his honours by wearing a crown of Jupiter's "triumphal" laurel. Ovations are listed along with triumphs on the Fasti Triumphales.

== Sources ==
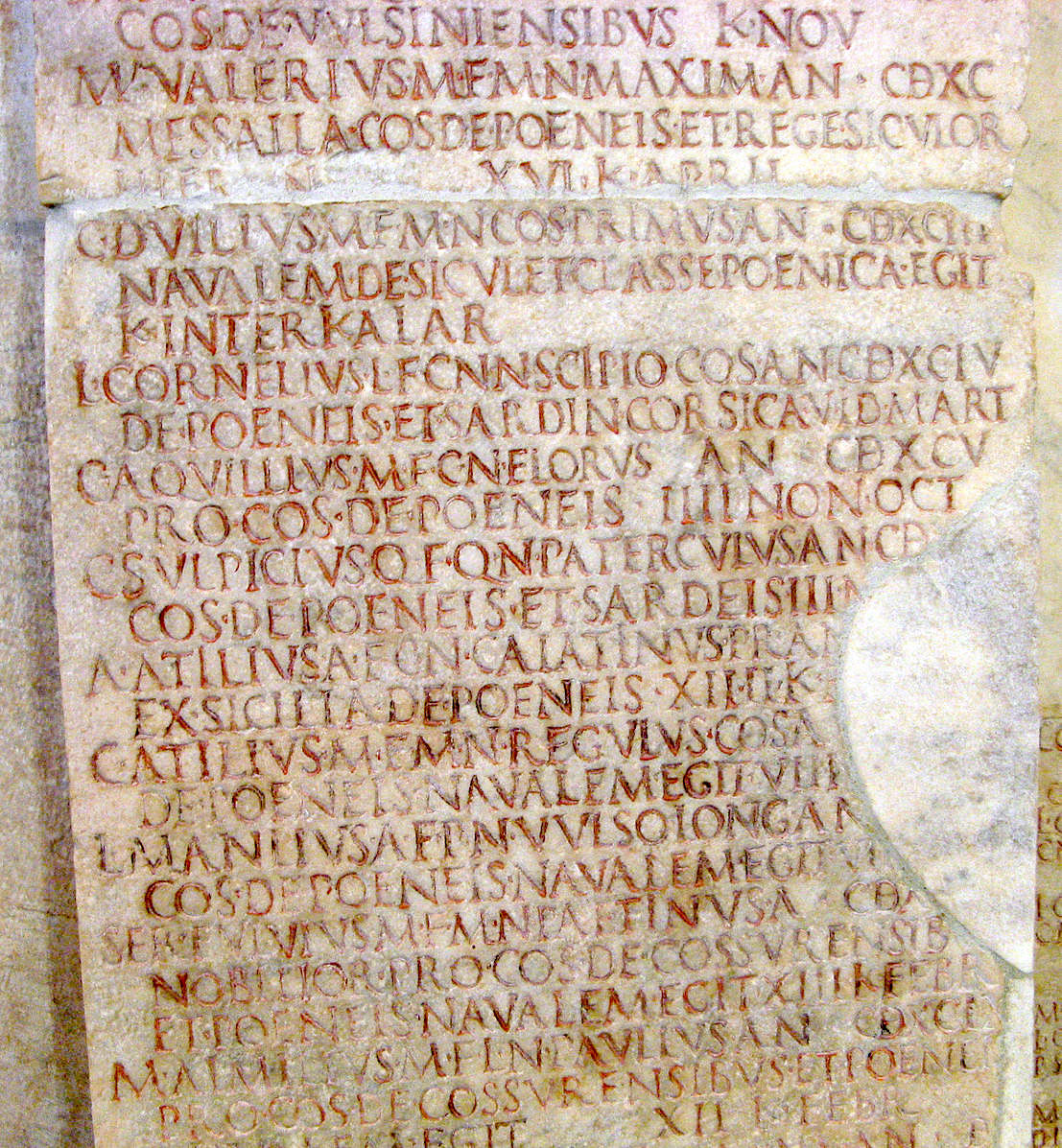
Segment XX of the Fasti triumphales, a portion recording triumphs during the First Punic War

The Fasti Triumphales (also called Acta Triumphalia) are stone tablets that were erected in the Forum Romanum around 12 BCE, during the reign of Emperor Augustus. They give the general's formal name, the names of his father and grandfather, the people(s) or command province whence the triumph was awarded, and the date of the triumphal procession. They record over 200 triumphs, starting with three mythical triumphs of Romulus in 753 BCE and ending with that of Lucius Cornelius Balbus (19 BCE). Fragments of similar date and style from Rome and provincial Italy appear to be modeled on the Augustan Fasti, and have been used to fill some of its gaps.

Many ancient historical accounts also mention triumphs. Most Roman accounts of triumphs were written to provide their readers with a moral lesson, rather than to provide an accurate description of the triumphal process, procession, rites, and their meaning. This scarcity allows only the most tentative and generalised (and possibly misleading) reconstruction of triumphal ceremony, based on the combination of various incomplete accounts from different periods of Roman history.

== Evolution ==
=== Origins and Regal era ===
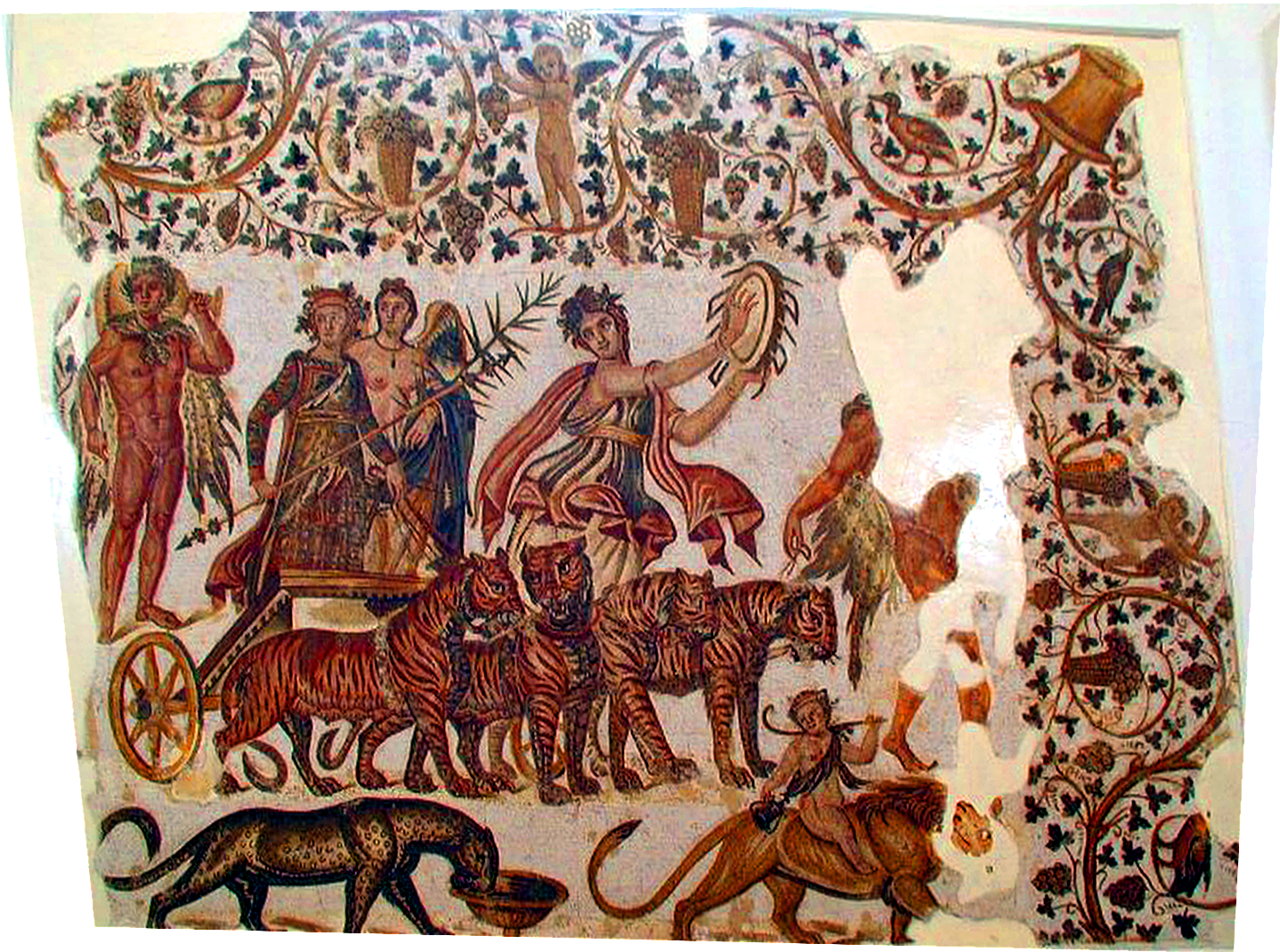
The Triumph of Bacchus, a Roman mosaic from Africa Proconsolaris, dated 3rd century CE, now in the Sousse Archaeological Museum, Tunisia

The origins and development of this honour are obscure. Roman historians placed the first triumph in the mythical past; some thought that it dated from Rome's foundation; others thought it more ancient than that. Roman etymologists thought that the soldiers' chant of triumpe was a borrowing via Etruscan of the Greek thriambus (θρίαμβος), cried out by satyrs and other attendants in Dionysian and Bacchic processions. Plutarch and some Roman sources traced the first Roman triumph and the "kingly" garb of the triumphator to Rome's first king Romulus, whose defeat of King Acron of the Caeninenses was thought coeval with Rome's foundation in 753 BCE. Ovid projected a fabulous and poetic triumphal precedent in the return of the god Bacchus/Dionysus from his conquest of India, drawn in a golden chariot by tigers and surrounded by maenads, satyrs, and assorted drunkards. Arrian attributed similar Dionysian and "Roman" elements to a victory procession of Alexander the Great. Like much in Roman culture, elements of the triumph were based on Etruscan and Greek precursors; in particular, the purple, embroidered toga picta worn by the triumphal general was thought to be derived from the royal toga of Rome's Etruscan kings.

For triumphs of the Roman regal era, the surviving Imperial Fasti Triumphales are incomplete. After three entries for the city's legendary founder Romulus, eleven lines of the list are missing. Next in sequence are Ancus Marcius, Tarquinius Priscus, Servius Tullius, and finally Tarquin "the proud", the last king. The Fasti were compiled some five centuries after the regal era, and probably represent an approved, official version of several different historical traditions. Likewise, the earliest surviving written histories of the regal era, written some centuries after it, attempt to reconcile various traditions, or else debate their merits. Dionysius, for example, gives Romulus three triumphs, the same number given in the Fasti. Livy gives him none, and credits him instead with the first spolia opima, in which the arms and armour were stripped off a defeated foe, then dedicated to Jupiter. Plutarch gives him one, complete with chariot. Tarquin has two triumphs in the Fasti but none in Dionysius. No ancient source gives a triumph to Romulus' successor, the peaceful king Numa.

=== The Republic ===
Rome's aristocrats expelled their last king as a tyrant and legislated the monarchy out of existence. They shared among themselves the kingship's former powers and authority in the form of magistracies. In the Republic, the highest possible magistracy was an elected consulship, which could be held for no more than a year at a time. In times of crisis or emergency, the Senate might appoint a dictator to serve a longer term; but this could seem perilously close to the lifetime power of kings. The dictator Camillus was awarded four triumphs but was eventually exiled. Later Roman sources point to his triumph of 396 BCE as a cause for offense; the chariot was drawn by four white horses, a combination properly reserved for Jupiter and Apollo – at least in later lore and poetry. The demeanour of a triumphal Republican general, and the symbols he employed in his triumph, would have been closely scrutinised by his aristocratic peers, alert for any sign that he might aspire to be more than "king for a day".

In the Middle to Late Republic, Rome's expansion through conquest offered her political-military adventurers extraordinary opportunities for self-publicity; the long-drawn series of wars between Rome and Carthage – the Punic Wars – produced twelve triumphs in ten years. Towards the end of the Republic, triumphs became still more frequent, lavish, and competitive, with each display an attempt (usually successful) to outdo the last. To have a triumphal ancestor – even one long-dead – counted for a lot in Roman society and politics. Cicero remarked that, in the race for power and influence, some individuals were not above vesting an inconveniently ordinary ancestor with triumphal grandeur and dignity, distorting an already fragmentary and unreliable historical tradition.

To Roman historians, the growth of triumphal ostentation undermined Rome's ancient "peasant virtues". Dionysius of Halicarnassus (c. 60 BCE to after 7 BCE) claimed that the triumphs of his day had "departed in every respect from the ancient tradition of frugality". Moralists complained that successful foreign wars might have increased Rome's power, security, and wealth, but they also created and fed a degenerate appetite for bombastic display and shallow novelty. Livy traces the start of the rot to the triumph of Gnaeus Manlius Vulso in 186, which introduced ordinary Romans to such Galatian fripperies as specialist chefs, flute girls, and other "seductive dinner-party amusements". Pliny adds "sideboards and one-legged tables" to the list, but lays responsibility for Rome's slide into luxury on the "1400 pounds of chased silver ware and 1500 pounds of golden vessels" brought somewhat earlier by Scipio Asiaticus for his triumph of 189 BCE.

The three triumphs awarded to Pompey the Great were lavish and controversial. The first in 80 or 81 BCE was for his victory over King Hiarbas of Numidia in 79 BCE, granted by a cowed and divided Senate under the dictatorship of Pompey's patron Sulla. Pompey was only 24 and a mere equestrian. Roman conservatives disapproved of such precocity but others saw his youthful success as the mark of a prodigious military talent, divine favour, and personal brio; and he also had an enthusiastic, popular following. His triumph, however, did not go quite to plan. His chariot was drawn by a team of elephants in order to represent his African conquest – and perhaps to outdo even the legendary triumph of Bacchus. They proved too bulky to pass through the triumphal gate, so Pompey had to dismount while a horse team was yoked in their place. This embarrassment would have delighted his critics, and probably some of his soldiers – whose demands for cash had been near-mutinous. Even so, his firm stand on the matter of cash raised his standing among the conservatives, and Pompey seems to have learned a lesson in populist politics. For his second triumph (71 BCE, the last in a series of four held that year) his cash gifts to his army were said to break all records, though the amounts in Plutarch's account are implausibly high: 6,000 sesterces to each soldier (about six times their annual pay) and about 5 million to each officer.

Pompey was granted a third triumph in 61 BCE to celebrate his victory over Mithridates VI of Pontus. It was an opportunity to outdo all rivals – and even himself. Triumphs traditionally lasted for one day, but Pompey's went on for two in an unprecedented display of wealth and luxury. Plutarch claimed that this triumph represented Pompey's domination over the entire world – on Rome's behalf – and an achievement to outshine even Alexander's. Pliny's narrative of this triumph dwells with ominous hindsight upon a gigantic portrait-bust of the triumphant general, a thing of "eastern splendor" entirely covered with pearls, anticipating his later humiliation and decapitation.

=== Imperial era ===
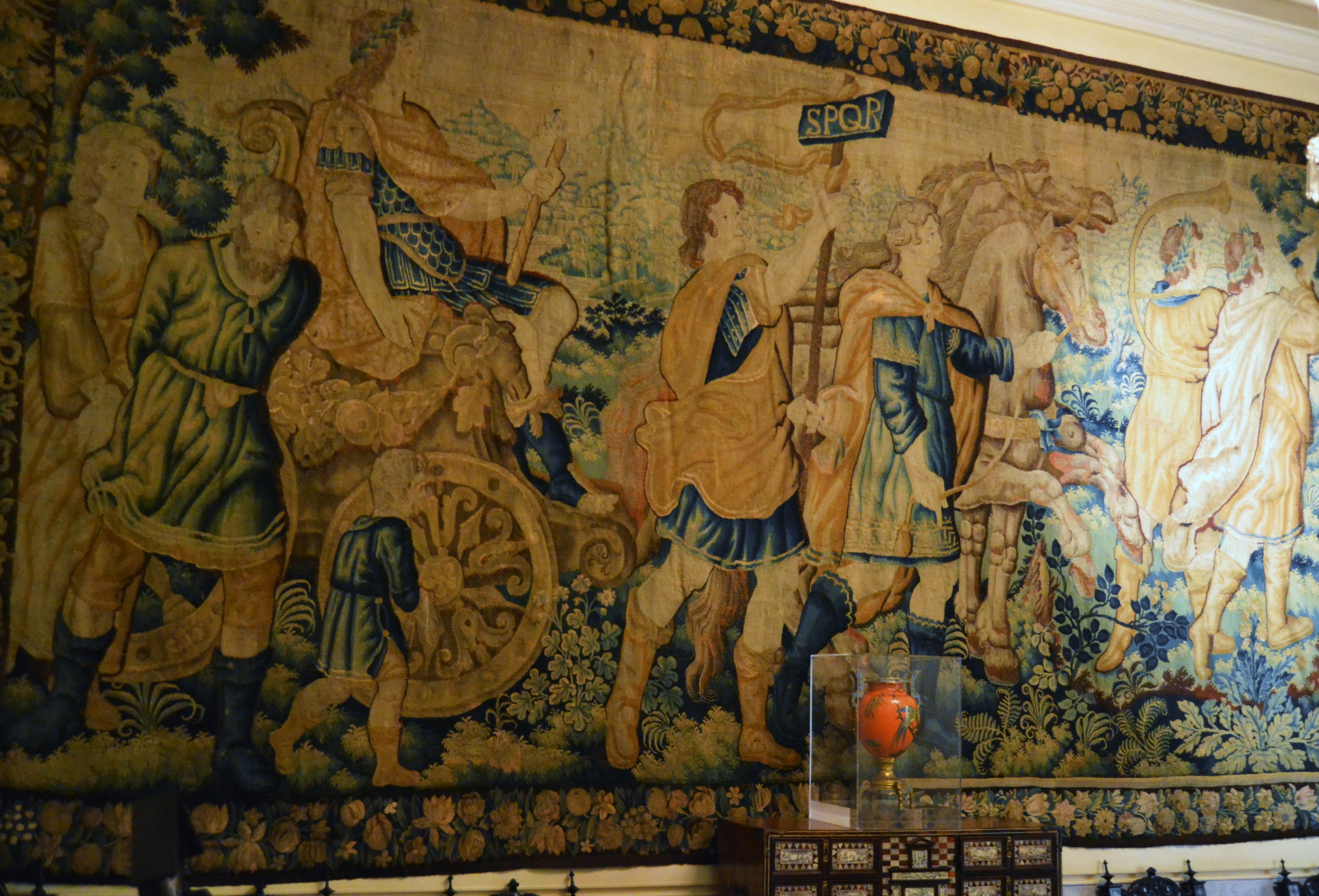
Flemish tapestry in the smoking room of the Palace of the Marqués de Dos Aguas

Following Caesar's murder, his adopted son Gaius Octavian assumed the permanent title of imperator and became the permanent head of the Senate from 27 BCE (see principate) under the title and name Augustus. Only the year before, he had blocked the senatorial award of a triumph to Marcus Licinius Crassus the Younger, despite the latter's acclamation in the field as Imperator and his fulfillment of all traditional, Republican qualifying criteria except full consulship. Technically, generals in the Imperial era were legates of the ruling Emperor (Imperator). Augustus claimed the victory as his own but permitted Crassus a second, which is listed on the Fasti for 27 BCE. Crassus was also denied the rare (and technically permissible, in his case) honour of dedicating the spolia opima of this campaign to Jupiter Feretrius.

The last triumph listed on the Fasti Triumphales is for 19 BCE. By then, the triumph had been absorbed into the Augustan imperial cult system, in which only the emperor would be accorded such a supreme honour, as he was the supreme Imperator. The Senate, in true Republican style, would have held session to debate and decide the merits of the candidate; but this was little more than good form. Augustan ideology insisted that Augustus had saved and restored the Republic, and it celebrated his triumph as a permanent condition, and his military, political, and religious leadership as responsible for an unprecedented era of stability, peace, and prosperity. From then on, emperors claimed – without seeming to claim – the triumph as an Imperial privilege. Those outside the Imperial family might be granted "triumphal ornaments" (Ornamenta triumphalia) or an ovation, such as Aulus Plautius under Claudius. The senate still debated and voted on such matters, though the outcome was probably already decided. In the Imperial era, the number of triumphs fell sharply.

Imperial panegyrics of the later Imperial era combine triumphal elements with Imperial ceremonies such as the consular investiture of Emperors, and the adventus, the formal "triumphal" arrival of an emperor in the various capitals of the Empire in his progress through the provinces. Some emperors were perpetually on the move and seldom or never went to Rome. Christian emperor Constantius II entered Rome for the first time in his life in 357, several years after defeating his rival Magnentius, standing in his triumphal chariot "as if he were a statue". Theodosius I celebrated his victory over the usurper Magnus Maximus in Rome on June 13, 389. Claudian's panegyric to Emperor Honorius records the last known official triumph in the city of Rome and the western Empire. Emperor Honorius celebrated it conjointly with his sixth consulship on January 1, 404; his general Stilicho had defeated Visigothic King Alaric at the battles of Pollentia and Verona. In Christian martyrology, Saint Telemachus was martyred by a mob while attempting to stop the customary gladiatorial games at this triumph, and gladiatorial games (munera gladiatoria) were banned in consequence. In 438 CE, however, the western emperor Valentinian III found cause to repeat the ban, which indicates that it was not always enforced.

In 534, well into the Byzantine era, Justinian I awarded general Belisarius a triumph that included some "radically new" Christian and Byzantine elements. Belisarius successfully campaigned against his adversary Vandal leader Gelimer to restore the former Roman province of Africa to the control of Byzantium in the 533–534 Vandalic War. The triumph was held in the Eastern Roman capital of Constantinople. Historian Procopius, an eyewitness who had previously been in Belisarius's service, describes the procession's display of the loot seized from the Temple of Jerusalem in 70 CE by Roman Emperor Titus, including the Temple Menorah. The treasure had been stored in Rome's Temple of Peace after its display in Titus' own triumphal parade and its depiction on his triumphal arch; then it was seized by the Vandals during their sack of Rome in 455; then it was taken from them in Belisarius' campaign. The objects themselves might well have recalled the ancient triumphs of Vespasian and his son Titus; but Belisarius and Gelimer walked, as in an ovation. The procession did not end at Rome's Capitoline Temple with a sacrifice to Jupiter, but terminated at Hippodrome of Constantinople with a recitation of Christian prayer and the triumphant generals prostrate before the emperor.

== Influence ==
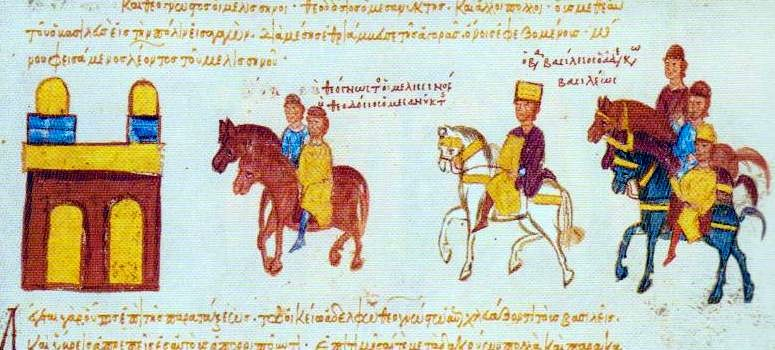
Miniature representation of the emperor Basil II's triumphal procession through the Forum of Constantinople, from the (Madrid Skylitzes)

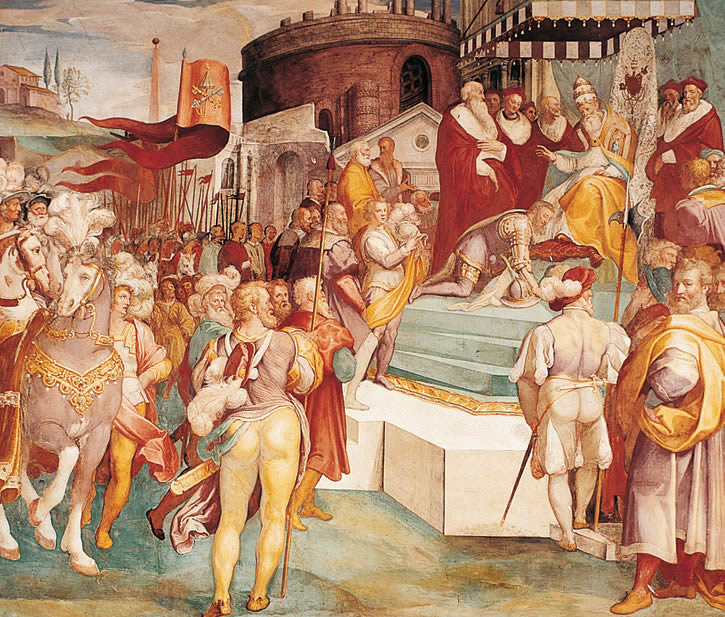
Charles V announcing the capture of Tunis to Pope Paul III, as imagined in an anonymous sixteenth century tapestry

During the Renaissance, kings and magnates sought ennobling connections with the classical past. Ghibelline Castruccio Castracani defeated the forces of the Guelph Florence in the 1325 Battle of Altopascio. Holy Roman Emperor Louis IV made him Duke of Lucca, and the city gave him a Roman-style triumph. The procession was led by his Florentine captives, made to carry candles in honour of Lucca's patron saint. Castracani followed, standing in a decorative chariot. His booty included the Florentines' portable, wheeled altar, the carroccio.

Flavio Biondo's Roma Triumphans (1459) claimed the ancient Roman triumph, divested of its pagan rites, as a rightful inheritance of Holy Roman Emperors. Italian poet Petrarch's Triumphs (I triomfi) represented the triumphal themes and biographies of ancient Roman texts as ideals for cultured, virtuous rule; it was influential and widely read. Andrea Mantegna's series of large paintings on the Triumphs of Caesar (1484–92, now Hampton Court Palace) became immediately famous and was endlessly copied in print form. The Triumphal Procession commissioned by Holy Roman Emperor Maximilian I (1512–19) from a group of artists including Albrecht Dürer was a series of woodcuts of an imaginary triumph of his own that could be hung as a frieze 54 metres (177 ft) long.

In the 1550s, the fragmentary Fasti Triumphales were unearthed and partially restored. Onofrio Panvinio's Fasti continued where the ancient Fasti left off. The last triumph recorded by Panvinio was the Royal Entry of Holy Roman Emperor Charles V into Rome on April 5, 1536, after his conquest of Tunis in 1535. Panvinio described it as a Roman triumph "over the infidel." The Emperor followed the traditional ancient route, "past the ruins of the triumphal arches of the soldier-emperors of Rome", where "actors dressed as ancient senators hailed the return of the new Caesar as miles christi," (a soldier of Christ).

The extravagant triumphal entry into Rouen of Henri II of France in 1550 was not "less pleasing and delectable than the third triumph of Pompey ... magnificent in riches and abounding in the spoils of foreign nations". A triumphal arch made for the Royal entry into Paris of Louis XIII in 1628 carried a depiction of Pompey.

== See also ==
- Imperial fora
- Joyous entry
- Roman triumphal honours
- Triumphal arch
- Victory parade

== Bibliography ==
- Aicher, Peter J. (2004). Rome alive : a source-guide to the ancient city. Wauconda, Ill.: Bolchazy-Carducci. ISBN 978-0865164734.
- Bastien J-L, Le triomphe romain et son utilisation politique à Rome aux trois derniers siècles de la République, CEFR 392, Rome, 2007
- Bastien J-L, Le triomphe à Rome sous la République, un rite monarchique dans une cité aristocratique (IVe-Ier siècle av. notre ère) dans Guisard P. et Laizé C. (dir.), La guerre et la paix, coll. Cultures antiques, Ellipses, 2014, pp. 509–526
- Beard, Mary: The Roman Triumph, The Belknap Press of Harvard University Press, Cambridge, Mass., and London, 2007. (hardcover). ISBN 978-0-674-02613-1
- Beard, M., Price, S., North, J., Religions of Rome: Volume 1, a History, illustrated, Cambridge University Press, 1998. ISBN 0-521-31682-0
- Bosworth, A. B., From Arrian to Alexander: Studies in Historical Interpretation, illustrated, reprint, Oxford University Press, 1988. ISBN 0-19-814863-1
- Bowersock, Glen W., "Dionysus as an Epic Hero," Studies in the Dionysiaca of Nonnos, ed. N. Hopkinson, Cambridge Philosophical Society, suppl. Vol. 17, 1994, 156–166.
- Brennan, T. Corey: "Triumphus in Monte Albano", 315–337 in R. W. Wallace & E. M. Harris (eds.) Transitions to Empire. Essays in Greco-Roman History, 360–146 B.C., in honor of E. Badian (University of Oklahoma Press, 1996) ISBN 0-8061-2863-1
- Galinsky, G. Karl, The Herakles theme: the adaptations of the hero in literature from Homer to the twentieth century (Oxford, 1972). ISBN 0-631-14020-4
- Goell, H. A., De triumphi Romani origine, permissu, apparatu, via (Schleiz, 1854)
- Künzl, E., Der römische Triumph (Münich, 1988)
- Lemosse, M., "Les éléments techniques de l'ancien triomphe romain et le probleme de son origine", in H. Temporini (ed.) ANRW I.2 (Berlin, 1972). Includes a comprehensive bibliography.
- MacCormack, Sabine, Change and Continuity in Late Antiquity: the ceremony of "Adventus", Historia, 21, 4, 1972, pp 721–752.
- Pais, E., Fasti Triumphales Populi Romani (Rome, 1920)
- Richardson, J. S., "The Triumph, the Praetors and the Senate in the early Second Century B.C.", JRS 65 (1975), 50–63
- Schmidt-Hofner, Sebastian, "Trajan und die symbolische Kommunikation bei kaiserlichen Rombesuchen in der Spätantike", in R. Behrwald & C. Witschel (eds.) Rom in der Spätantike (Steiner, 2012) pp. 33–60. ISBN 978-3-515-09445-0
- Southern, Pat, Augustus, illustrated, reprint, Routledge, 1998. ISBN 0-415-16631-4
- Syme, Ronald, The Augustan Aristocracy (Oxford University Press, 1986; Clarendon reprint with corrections, 1989) ISBN 0-19-814731-7
- Versnel, H S: Triumphus: An Inquiry into the Origin, Development and Meaning of the Roman Triumph (Leiden, 1970)
- Wienand, Johannes, "O tandem felix civili, Roma, victoria! Civil War Triumphs From Honorius to Constantine and Back", in J. Wienand (ed.) Contested Monarchy: Integrating the Roman Empire in the 4th Century AD (Oxford, 2015) pp. 169–197 ISBN 978-0-19-976899-8
- Wienand, Johannes; Goldbeck, Fabian; Börm, Henning: Der römische Triumph in Prinzipat und Spätantike. Probleme – Paradigmen – Perspektiven, in F. Goldbeck, J. Wienand (eds.): Der römische Triumph in Prinzipat und Spätantike (Berlin/New York, 2017), pp. 1–26.
- Zaho, Margaret A, and Bernstein, Eckhard, Imago Triumphalis: The Function and Significance of Triumphal Imagery for Italian Renaissance Rulers, Peter Lang Publishing Inc, 2004, ISBN 978-0-8204-6235-6
