= Raphael Cormack =

British writer and scholar

Dr Raphael Cormack
- Born: Raphael Christian Cormack
- Occupations: Writer, academic
- Parent(s): Mary Beard; Robin Cormack

Academic background
- Education: University of Edinburgh (PhD)
- Thesis: Oedipus on the Nile: translations and adaptations of Sophocles' Oedipus Tyrannos in Egypt, 1900-1970 (2017)
- Doctoral advisor: Marilyn Booth; Olga Taxido

Academic work
- School or tradition: Islamic and Middle Eastern Studies
- Institutions: School of Modern Languages and Cultures, University of Durham
- Website: Researcher Profile

Raphael Christian Cormack is a British writer and scholar of the Arab world and Assistant Professor of Arabic at Durham University. He obtained his PhD in Egyptian Theatre from the University of Edinburgh. He has also been a visiting researcher at Columbia University. He has written essays on Arab culture in outlets such as the London Review of Books, Prospect, and the Times Literary Supplement. He has also edited two anthologies titled The Book of Cairo and The Book of Khartoum.

Cormack is the author of Midnight in Cairo: The Female Stars of Egypt's Roaring ’20s, an exploration of Cairo popular culture through personalities such as Rose Al-Youssef, Mounira al-Mahdiyya and Oum Kalthoum, and of Holy Men of the Electromagnetic Age: A Forgotten History of the Occult, a biography of Dr. Dahesh and the traveling Armenian fakir Tahra-Bey who inspired him.

He is the son of Robin Cormack and historian Mary Beard. He is married to Pamela Takefman.
