= SPQR: A History of Ancient Rome =

2015 nonfiction book by Mary Beard

- First edition (UK)
- Author: Mary Beard
- Language: English
- Genre: History
- Publisher: Liveright & Company; Profile Books
- Publication date: 2015
- Publication place: United Kingdom
- Pages: 608 pages
- ISBN: 978-0-87140-423-7
- OCLC: 920861705
- Dewey Decimal: 937

SPQR: A History of Ancient Rome is a 2015 book by English classicist Mary Beard that was published in the United Kingdom by Profile Books and elsewhere by Liveright & Company.

SPQR appeared on the New York Times hardcover, non-fiction bestseller list in December 2015. It was a finalist for the 2015 National Book Critics Circle Award (Nonfiction).

SPQR or S.P.Q.R., an initialism for Senatus Populusque Romanus (Classical Latin: [sɛˈnaːtʊs pɔpʊˈɫʊskʷɛ roːˈmaːnʊs]; transl. "The Senate and People of Rome"), is an emblematic phrase referring to the government of the Roman Republic. It appears on documents made public by an inscription in stone or metal, in dedications of monuments and public works, and on some Roman currency.

== Content ==
Mary Beard begins her narrative with the Cicero vs Catilina case, then switches to the history of Rome from the beginning, and ends her narrative with Caracalla. Besides notable persons, she devotes much space to women and other wretched of the Roman world. She also focuses on pivotal events, such as the rise of Rome to primacy, the fall of the Republic, and the edict of Caracalla, and offers her interpretations.

The rise of Rome to Mediterranean supremacy was an irrational rather than planned process. The motives of glory and booty were present from the outset but these motives do not compose a plan for world domination. The Roman Empire was not an accidental by-product of self-defense and the defense of allies but partly these factors were at work. "They did not invade a world of peace-loving peoples, who were just minding their own business until these voracious thugs came along." Certainly, "part of the pressure for Rome to intervene did come from outside."

The destruction and annexation of Carthage and Corynth in 146 BCE were seen as the beginning of the collapse of the Republic and as the herald of a century of increasing violence, civil wars, the fall of the Republic and the rise of autocracy. Both modern historians and classics, primarily Sallust, emphasized external threats. Fear of the enemy, so this argument went, generated internal harmony. Having eliminated all significant external threats by 146 BC, Rome was plunged into civil strife to which it could find no solution but Caesar. In the chapter, titled "From Empire to Emperors," Beard concludes: "the empire created the emperors – not the other way round."

Beard devotes her last chapter to Caracalla who granted Roman citizenship to all free inhabitants of the Empire in 212 AD. In one stroke, 30 million people became citizens in what she supposes to be the largest event of naturalization in world history. But in conclusion, Beard warns us not "to learn directly from the Romans... And attractive as some Roman approaches to citizenship may sound, as I have tried to explain them, it would be folly to imagine that they could be applied to our situation, centuries later." Her final advice is do not try it at home.
