= The Roman Triumph =

- Author: Mary Beard
- Publisher: Belknap Press
- Publication date: 2007 (UK)
- Pages: 434

The Roman Triumph is a 2007 book by Mary Beard.

== Content ==
The book explores the ritual of the triumph in ancient Roman life, opening with a discussion of Pompey the Great's third triumph of 61 BC which is the most documented of all the Roman triumphs. In the course of the book she explores the triumph from a number of different angles. For example, citing writers such as Ovid as well as epigraphic attestations she tries to delineate what the experience of the triumph was for the common and ordinary people of Rome rather than solely the elite. She also adopts a minimalist position on the question of whether or not triumphs were bound by very detailed and specific rules and regulations, asserting instead that they were somewhat flexible in format and changed over the course of time. She also breaks down a popular theory such as the idea that the Roman general who was being honoured in the process embodied the god Jupiter Optimus Maximus himself, arguing that there is evidence for this but also counter-evidence. She then concludes with a discussion of the triumph of Belisarius in 534 which is often described as the final Roman triumph of all.

Beard's analysis cuts through the enormous amount of writing about Roman triumphs to try to ascertain what their reality was as a fixture in Roman life, attempting to demystify them from the large number of what she refers to as 'rituals in ink' that have existed (whereby contemporary writers such as Polybius, Livy or Josephus sought to glorify a particular triumph) and the large amount of secondary historical scholarship on the matter. An example of the kind of details that are heavily contested and questionable is the tradition of a slave accompanying a processing general repeatedly urging him to remember that he is mortal; this tradition is mentioned differently in accounts by Pliny, Dio or Tertullian and is not mentioned at all in other accounts. Beard therefore argues that such stories may in fact be myth-making rather than a report of actual reality. Another aspect of the oft-repeated later depiction of the triumph includes stories of harsh treatment of captives, which Beard argues may instead have involved a reality where they were treated relatively mildly before then often becoming citizens.
