= Robin Cormack =

British classicist and art historian

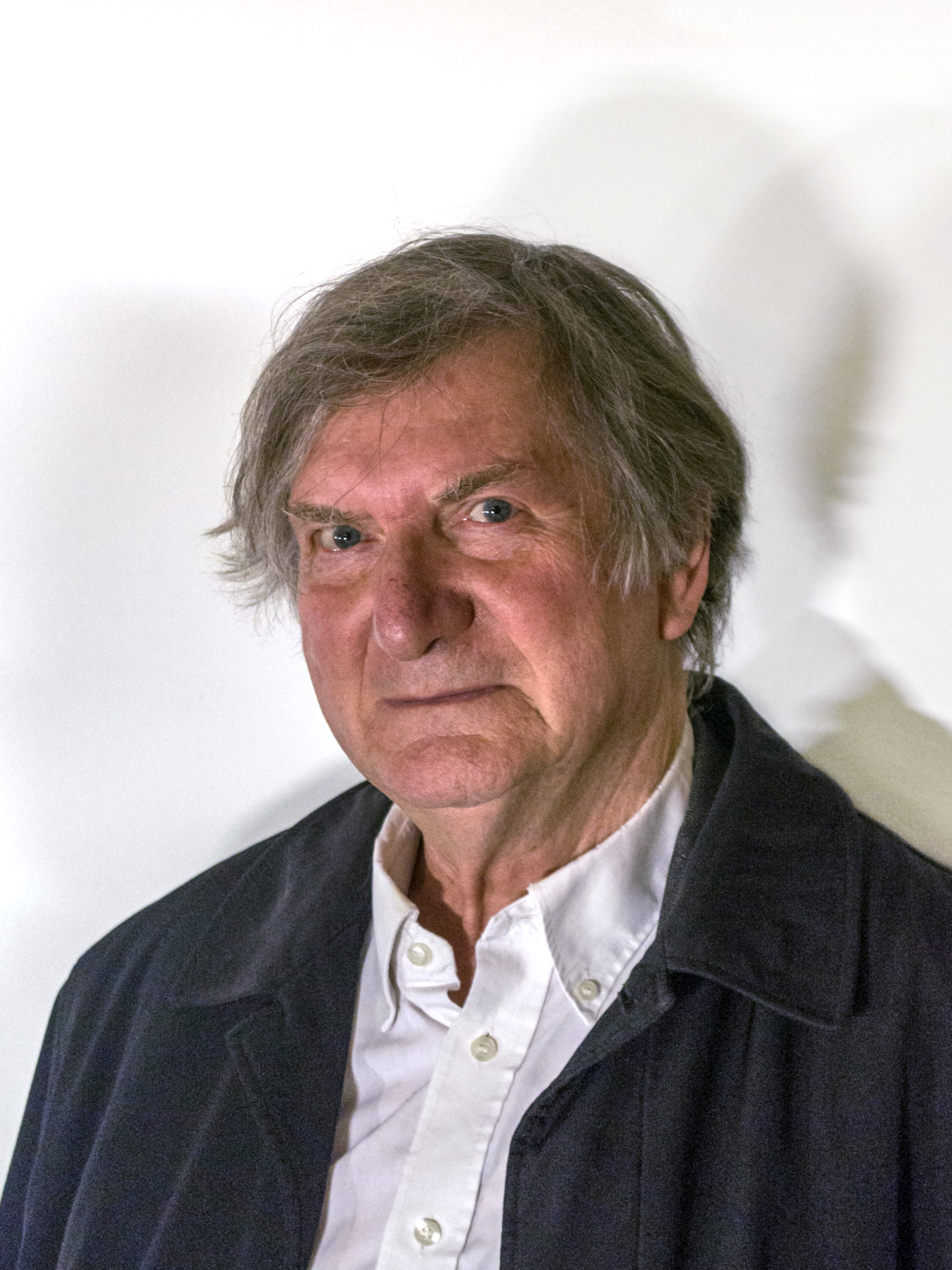
- Cormack in 2017
- Born: 27 September 1938 (age 87)
- Education: Exeter College, Oxford; The Courtauld Institute of Art
- Spouses: Annabel Shackleton (m. 1961, divorced); Mary Beard (m. 1985)
- Children: 4, including Raphael

Robin Sinclair Cormack, FSA (born 27 September 1938) is a British classicist and art historian, specialising in Byzantine art. He was Professor in the History of Art, Courtauld Institute of Art, University of London, 1991–2004.

== Career ==
Robin Cormack was educated at Bristol Grammar School and Exeter College, Oxford, and gained his PhD degree from the Courtauld Institute of Art of the University of London. He wrote his thesis on Thessaloniki after iconoclasm under the supervision of Hugo Buchthal and Cyril Mango and it was the latter who suggested he should spend time at Dumbarton Oaks. Cormack became visiting fellow of Byzantine studies at Dumbarton Oaks in the 1972–1973 academic year, taking a year's leave from his lectureship at the Courtauld Institute (1966–1982). He later returned to Dumbarton Oaks as a visiting scholar in 2011.

After three years as reader at the Warburg Institute, during which he also held a fellowship at Robinson College, Cambridge 1984–1985, Cormack returned to the Courtauld Institute as reader and professor. He was also deputy director 1999–2002. Photographs attributed to Cormack are held in the Conway Library, the archive of which of primarily architectural images is being digitised under the wider Courtauld Connects project.

After retiring from the Courtauld, Cormack held a Leverhulme Emeritus Fellowship 2004–2006 and a scholarship at the Getty Research Institute 2005–2006, and was Special Professor in Classics at the University of Nottingham 2005–2008.

He is now invited lecturer in the Faculty of Classics, University of Cambridge (where his wife, Mary Beard, is Professor of Classics), professor emeritus in the History of Art, University of London, and senior academic visitor at Wolfson College, Cambridge. His current research interests include the cultural history of Saint Catherine's Monastery from Late Antiquity onwards.

During his career, Cormack has acted as an adviser and/or curator on a number of exhibitions. He gained experience, during his student days, at the Institute of Contemporary Arts (ICA) where he worked under Roland Penrose and Herbert Read regularly hanging exhibitions. His first exhibition was of Bulgarian icons in Edinburgh in the seventies. He was consultant for the Royal Academy of Arts, London for their exhibitions From Byzantine to El Greco (1987) and The Art of Holy Russia: Icons from Moscow 1400–1660 (1998), and co-curator, with Professor Maria Vassilaki, University of Thessaly at Volos and the Benaki Museum, of the Royal Academy's major exhibition Byzantium 330–1453 (2008–2009).

== Personal life ==
In 1961 Cormack married Annabel Shackleton, a maths teacher and linguist; they had a daughter, Sophia, and a son, Justin. After separation and then divorce, Cormack married Mary Beard in 1985; they have a daughter, Zoe, born in 1985, and a son, Raphael Cormack, born in 1987.

== Publications ==
- Writing in gold: Byzantine society and its icons, Oxford University Press, 1985, ISBN 0-19-520486-7 (translated into French by Marie-Odile Bernez as Icones et Société à Byzance, G. Monfort, Paris, 1993, ISBN 2-85226-068-9).
- The Byzantine Eye: studies in art and patronage, Variorum Reprints, London, 1989. ISBN 0-86078-244-1
- Painting the soul: icons, death masks, and shrouds, Reaktion, London, 1997 (Runciman Award, 1998). ISBN 1-86189-001-X
- Byzantine Art, Oxford University Press, 2000. ISBN 0-19-284211-0
- Icons, British Museum Press, 2007. ISBN 0-7141-2655-1
- Byzantium 330–1453 with Maria Vassilaki, Catalogue of the Royal Academy Exhibition, 2008. ISBN 1-905711-26-3
- Oxford Handbook of Byzantine Studies, with Elizabeth Jeffreys and John Haldon, Oxford University Press, 2008. ISBN 0-19-925246-7

== Sources ==
- Faculty page at University of Cambridge
- CORMACK, Prof. Robin Sinclair, Who's Who 2012, A & C Black, 2012; online edn, Oxford University Press, Dec 2011, accessed 4 Feb 2012
- CORMACK, Prof. Robin Sinclair, Who's Who and Who Was Who 2019, A & C Black, 2019; online edn, Oxford University Press, Dec 2018, accessed 15 Dec 2019
