= Meet the Romans with Mary Beard =

- Genre: Documentary
- Written by: Mary Beard
- Directed by: Hugo MacGregor
- Presented by: Mary Beard
- Composers: Matt Winch; Andrew Hamilton
- Country of origin: United Kingdom
- Original language: English
- No. of episodes: 3

Production
- Executive producers: Cassian Harrison (BBC); Richard Bradley
- Producer: Caterina Turroni
- Cinematography: Prospero Bozzo; Doug Hartington; Ian Salvage
- Running time: 55–60 minutes
- Production companies: Lion Television A113 Media; BBC production

Original release
- Network: BBC
- Release: 17 April – 1 May 2012

Meet the Romans with Mary Beard is a 2012 BBC documentary series written and presented by Mary Beard about the ordinary citizens of Ancient Rome, the world's first metropolis. It was repeated in 2020 and 2025.

== Episode one: All Roads Lead to Rome ==
Beard takes the Via Appia to Rome to show the lives of ordinary citizens in imperial times, those citizens who would be in the top seats of the Colosseum. She takes a boat to Rome's port Ostia, where imported goods come from all over the Mediterranean, and she takes us into the bowels of Monte Testaccio. She features extraordinary Romans such as Eurysaces, a baker who made a fortune in the grain trade and built his tomb in the shape of a giant bread oven; Pupius Amicus, the purple dye seller making imperial dye from shellfish imported from Tunisia; and Baricha, Zabda and Achiba, three prisoners of war who became Roman citizens.

UK viewing figures: 1.97 million

== Episode two: Street life ==
She goes into the streets to discover the dirt, crime, sex and slum conditions in the world's first high-rise city, where the poorer you were the higher you lived with little space, light, or sanitation. Rooms that were only slept in forced the poor to go outdoors into the city streets to eat, wash, get water and go to the lavatory. She looks at the Roman Forum as a place of gamblers, dentists, thieves, prostitutes and rent boys. A huge wall separated the rich from the poor in their wooden tenements that often caught fire, with no proper fire service to put them out. At night the streets were a mugger's paradise with no police force. Politicians who tried to provide social services were murdered lest they become too popular.

UK viewing figures: 1.87 million

== Episode three: Behind Closed Doors ==
To learn about their family life, Beard looks at the thousands of tombstones of ordinary Romans, their children and slaves. Unwanted babies were left outside to die. Of the children that were wanted, half died by the age of ten. Children were put to work at manual labour as soon as they were able, often from the age of five. Schooling for the few would be for boys only, learning to read and write, practise public speaking, and appreciate poetry. Few girls were married as early as the age of twelve, but many more were given away in their teenage years. One tombstone belonged to a 16-year-old girl murdered by her husband. Childbirth was equally dangerous with the tools available at the time. Slaves were regarded as part of the family and used as sex slaves. Masters and mistresses often married their freed slaves; other slaves were buried in the same tomb as their masters.

UK viewing figures: 2.00 million

== See also ==
- Mary Beard
- BBC Two
