= Mary Beard =

English classicist (born 1955)

Dame Mary Beard DBE FSA FBA FRSL
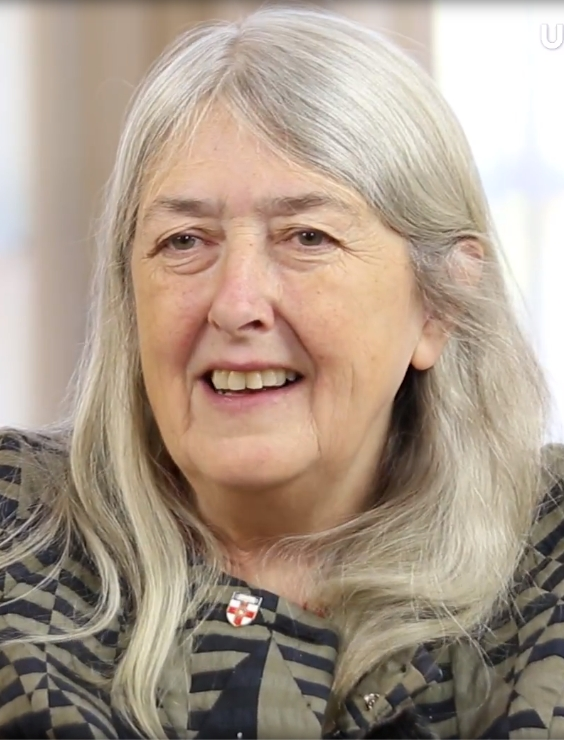
- Beard in 2017
- Born: Winifred Mary Beard; 1 January 1955 (age 71); Much Wenlock, Shropshire, England
- Spouse: Robin Cormack (m. 1985)
- Children: 2, including Raphael
- Awards: Wolfson History Prize (2009); Dame Commander of the Order of the British Empire (2018); Princess of Asturias Awards (2016); Bodley Medal (2016)

Academic background
- Education: Newnham College, Cambridge (MA, PhD)
- Thesis: The state religion in the late Roman Republic: a study based on the works of Cicero (1982)
- Doctoral advisor: John Crook

Academic work
- Discipline: Classics
- Sub-discipline: Ancient Rome; Roman art; Classical archaeology
- Institutions: King's College London; University of Cambridge; University of California, Berkeley
- Notable works: The Roman Triumph; SPQR: A History of Ancient Rome

Dame Winifred Mary Beard (born 1 January 1955) is an English classicist specialising in Ancient Rome. She is a trustee of the British Museum and formerly held a personal professorship of classics at the University of Cambridge. She is a fellow of Newnham College, Cambridge, and Royal Academy of Arts Professor of Ancient Literature.

Beard is the classics editor of The Times Literary Supplement, for which she also writes a regular blog, "A Don's Life". Her frequent media appearances and sometimes controversial public statements have led to her being described as "Britain's best-known classicist". In 2014, The New Yorker characterised her as "learned but accessible".

== Early life and education ==
Mary Beard, an only child, was born on 1 January 1955 in Much Wenlock, Shropshire, England. Her mother, Joyce Emily Beard, was a headmistress and an enthusiastic reader. Her father, Roy Whitbread Beard, worked as an architect in Shrewsbury. She recalled him as "a raffish public-schoolboy type and a complete wastrel, but very engaging".

Beard first became interested in the classics during a 1960 visit to the British Museum with her mother. She describes sitting on her mother's shoulders, trying to see a bread roll from Ancient Egypt. A museum curator noticed her struggle, unlocked the case, and allowed her to view the roll. She describes her resulting wonder at its ordinariness as a catalyst for her historical interests. She dedicated her 2026 book, Talking Classics: The Shock of the Old, to this curator.

Beard was educated at Shrewsbury High School, a girls' school then funded as a direct grant grammar school. She was taught poetry by Frank McEachran, who was teaching at the nearby Shrewsbury School. During the summer she would join archaeological excavations, though the motivation was, in part, just the prospect of earning some pocket-money.

At 18 she sat the then-compulsory entrance exam and interview for Cambridge University, winning a place at Newnham College, a single-sex college. She had considered King's, but rejected it when she learned the college did not offer scholarships to women.

In Beard's first year she found that some men in the university still held very dismissive attitudes regarding the academic potential of women, which only strengthened her determination to succeed. She also developed feminist views that remained "hugely important" in her later life, although she later described "modern orthodox feminism" as partly cant. One of her tutors was Joyce Reynolds. Beard has since said that "Newnham could do better in making itself a place where critical issues can be generated" and has also described her views on feminism, saying "I actually can't understand what it would be to be a woman without being a feminist." Beard has cited Germaine Greer's The Female Eunuch, Kate Millett's Sexual Politics, and Robert Munsch's The Paper Bag Princess as influential on the development of her personal feminism.

Beard graduated from Cambridge with a Bachelor of Arts (BA) degree; as per tradition, her BA was later promoted to a Master of Arts (MA Cantab) degree. She remained at Cambridge for her Doctor of Philosophy (PhD) degree, completing it in 1982 with a doctoral thesis titled The State Religion in the Late Roman Republic: A Study Based on the Works of Cicero.

== Academic career ==
Between 1979 and 1983, Beard lectured in classics at King's College London; she returned to Cambridge in 1984 as a Fellow of Newnham College and the only female lecturer in the classics faculty. The book Rome in the Late Republic, which she co-wrote with Cambridge historian Michael Crawford, was published the following year.

John Sturrock, classics editor of The Times Literary Supplement, approached her for a review and brought her into literary journalism. Beard took over his role in 1992 at the request of Ferdinand Mount.

Shortly after the 11 September 2001 attacks on the World Trade Center, Beard was one of several authors invited to contribute articles on the topic to the London Review of Books. She opined that many people, once "the shock had faded", thought "the United States had it coming", and that "[w]orld bullies, even if their heart is in the right place, will in the end pay the price". In a November 2007 interview, she stated the hostility these comments provoked had still not subsided, though she believed it had become a standard viewpoint that terrorism was associated with American foreign policy. By this point she was described by Paul Laity of The Guardian as "Britain's best-known classicist".

In 2004 Beard, through internal promotion, became Professor of Classics at Cambridge. She taught actor Tom Hiddleston.

In 2007–08, Beard gave the Sigmund H. Danziger Jr. Memorial Lecture in the Humanities at the University of Chicago. She was elected Visiting Sather Professor of Classical Literature for 2008–2009 at the University of California, Berkeley, at which she delivered a series of lectures on "Roman Laughter".

In 2014 Beard delivered a lecture on the public voice of women at the British Museum as part of the London Review of Books winter lecture series. It was recorded and broadcast on BBC Four a month later under the title Oh Do Shut Up, Dear!. The lecture begins with the example of Telemachus, the son of Odysseus and Penelope, admonishing his mother to retreat to her chamber. (The title alludes to Prime Minister David Cameron telling a female MP to "Calm down, dear!", which earned widespread criticism as a "classic sexist put-down".) Three years later, Beard gave a second lecture for the same partners, entitled Women in Power: from Medusa to Merkel. It considered the extent to which the exclusion of women from power is culturally embedded, and how idioms from ancient Greece are still used to normalise gendered violence. She argues that "we don't have a model or a template for what a powerful woman looks like. We only have templates that make them men."

In 2019 Beard gave the sesquicentennial Public Lecture for the North American Society for Classical Studies, marking the 150-year anniversary of the organisation. The topic of her presentation was What do we mean by Classics now? She delivered the Gifford Lectures in May 2019 at Edinburgh University, under the title The Ancient World and Us: From Fear and Loathing to Enlightenment and Ethics.

In 2020 Beard was appointed a trustee of the British Museum. In 2023 Profile Books published Emperor of Rome: Ruling the Ancient Roman World; writing for Literary Review, Harry Sidebottom called it "her best book so far".

In 2026 Beard published Talking Classics: The Shock of the Old with Profile Books, based on the Berlin Family Lectures she had delivered to the University of Chicago in 2023 and her 2019 Gifford Lectures, delivered to the University of Edinburgh.

=== Approach to scholarship ===
University of Chicago classicist Clifford Ando described Beard's scholarship as having two key aspects in its approach to sources. One is that she insists that ancient sources be understood as documentation of the attitudes, context and beliefs of their authors, not as reliable sources for the events they address. The other is that she argues that modern histories of Rome must be contextualised within the attitudes, world views and purposes of their authors.

== Television work ==
In 1994, she made an early television appearance on an Open Media discussion for the BBC, Weird Thoughts, alongside Jenny Randles among others. This was characterised in an article in 2021 as follows:

Weird Thoughts, where Tony Wilson chairs a panel of experts debating why the 1990s seem so very strange. There are a lot of familiar faces here – the late James Randi, Fortean Times founder Bob Rickard, esoteric scholar Lynn Picknett – but today the biggest name is the one hovering around the back of the gathering: a young Mary Beard. As a respectable academic, Professor Beard was presumably brought in to back up Randi, but her views are interestingly hard to define. She agrees with Picknett's suggestion that 'weird' should be reclassified as 'other', noting this is how the ancient world referred to overseas lands. This suggestion that UFOs should be bracketed with, say, Perth shows why Beard, particularly in this company, is a very modern thinker.

In 2010, on BBC Two, Beard presented Pompeii: Life and Death in a Roman Town, submitting remains from the town to forensic tests, aiming to show a snapshot of the lives of the residents prior to the eruption of Mount Vesuvius in 79 CE. In 2011, she took part in a television series, Jamie's Dream School on Channel 4, in which she taught classics to teenagers with no experience of academic success. Beard is a regular contributor to the BBC Radio 4 series, A Point of View, delivering essays on a broad range of topics including Miss World and the Oxbridge interview.

For BBC Two in 2012, she wrote and presented the three part television series, Meet the Romans with Mary Beard, which concerns how ordinary people lived in Rome, "the world's first global metropolis". The critic A. A. Gill reviewed the programme, writing mainly about her appearance, judging her "too ugly for television". Beard admitted that his attack felt like a punch, but swiftly responded with a counter-attack on his intellectual abilities, accusing him of being part of "the blokeish culture that loves to decry clever women". This exchange became the focus of a debate about older women on the public stage, with Beard saying she looked an ordinary woman of her age and "there are kids who turn on these programmes and see there's another way of being a woman", without Botox and hair dye. Charlotte Higgins assessed Beard as one of the rare academics who is both well respected by her peers and has a high profile in the media.

Beard was an advisor to the production of Plebs, an ITV2 sitcom set in ancient Rome. In 2013, she presented Caligula with Mary Beard on BBC Two, describing the making of myths around leaders and dictators. Interviewers continued to ask about her self-presentation, and she reiterated that she had no intention of undergoing a make-over.

In 2015, Beard was again a panellist on BBC's Question Time from Bath. During the programme, she praised Labour Party leader Jeremy Corbyn for behaving with a "considerable degree of dignity" against claims he faces an overly hostile media. She said: "Quite a lot of what Corbyn says I agree with, and I rather like his different style of leadership. I like hearing argument not soundbites. If the Labour Party is going through a rough time, and I'm sure it is rough to be in there, it might actually all be to the good. He might be changing the party in a way that would make it easier for people like me to vote for."

2016 saw Beard present Pompeii: New Secrets Revealed with Mary Beard on BBC One in March. While May 2016, brought about a four-part series shown on BBC Two, titled Mary Beard's Ultimate Rome: Empire Without Limit.

Beard's standalone documentary Julius Caesar Revealed was shown on BBC One in 2018. In March, she wrote and presented "How Do We Look?" and "The Eye of Faith", two of the nine episodes in Civilisations, a reboot of the 1969 series by Kenneth Clark.

In 2019, Beard appeared in an episode of The Grand Tour, having dinner with host James May, in his effort to get his car photographed by paparazzi.

In 2020, Beard became the host of the newly developed topical arts series Lockdown Culture, which was later renamed Inside Culture and is broadcast on BBC Two. She also released The Shock of the Nude - a two-part TV documentary tackling controversies surrounding the naked body in the arts, from ancient classics to the visual cultures of today.

In April 2013 she was named as Royal Academy of Arts Professor of Ancient Literature. Beard was awarded an honorary degree from Oxford University in June 2018. She also received an honorary degree from Yale University in May 2019.

In January 2025, it was announced that Mary Beard had become an ambassador for the National Trust.

== Social media ==
Beard is known for being active on X (formerly Twitter), which she sees as part of her public role as an academic. Beard received considerable online abuse after she appeared on BBC's Question Time from Lincolnshire in January 2013 and cast doubt on the negative rhetoric about immigrant workers living in the county. She asserted her right to express unpopular opinions and to present herself in public in a way she deemed authentic. On 4 August 2013, she received a bomb threat on Twitter, hours after the UK head of Twitter had apologised to women who had experienced abuse on the service. Beard said she did not think she was in physical danger, but considered it harassment and wanted to "make sure" that another case had been logged by the police. She has been praised for exposing "social media at its most revolting and misogynistic".

In 2017, Beard became the target of considerable online abuse after she made the case that Roman Britain was more ethnically diverse than is often assumed. The source of the controversy was a BBC educational video depicting a senior Roman soldier as a black man, which Beard defended as entirely possible after the video received backlash. There followed, according to Beard, "a torrent of aggressive insults, on everything from my historical competence and elitist ivory tower viewpoint to my age, shape and gender [batty old broad, obese, etc etc]."

In 2018, in response to a report in The Times of Oxfam employees engaging in sexual exploitation in disaster zones, Beard tweeted "Of course one can't condone the (alleged) behaviour of Oxfam staff in Haiti and elsewhere. But I do wonder how hard it must be to sustain 'civilised' values in a disaster zone. And overall I still respect those who go in and help out, where most of us would not tread." This led to widespread criticism, in which Mary Beard was accused of racism. In response, Beard posted a picture of herself crying, explaining that she had been subjected to a "torrent of abuse" and that "I find it hard to imagine that anyone out there could possibly think that I am wanting to turn a blind eye to the abuse of women and children".

== Personal life ==
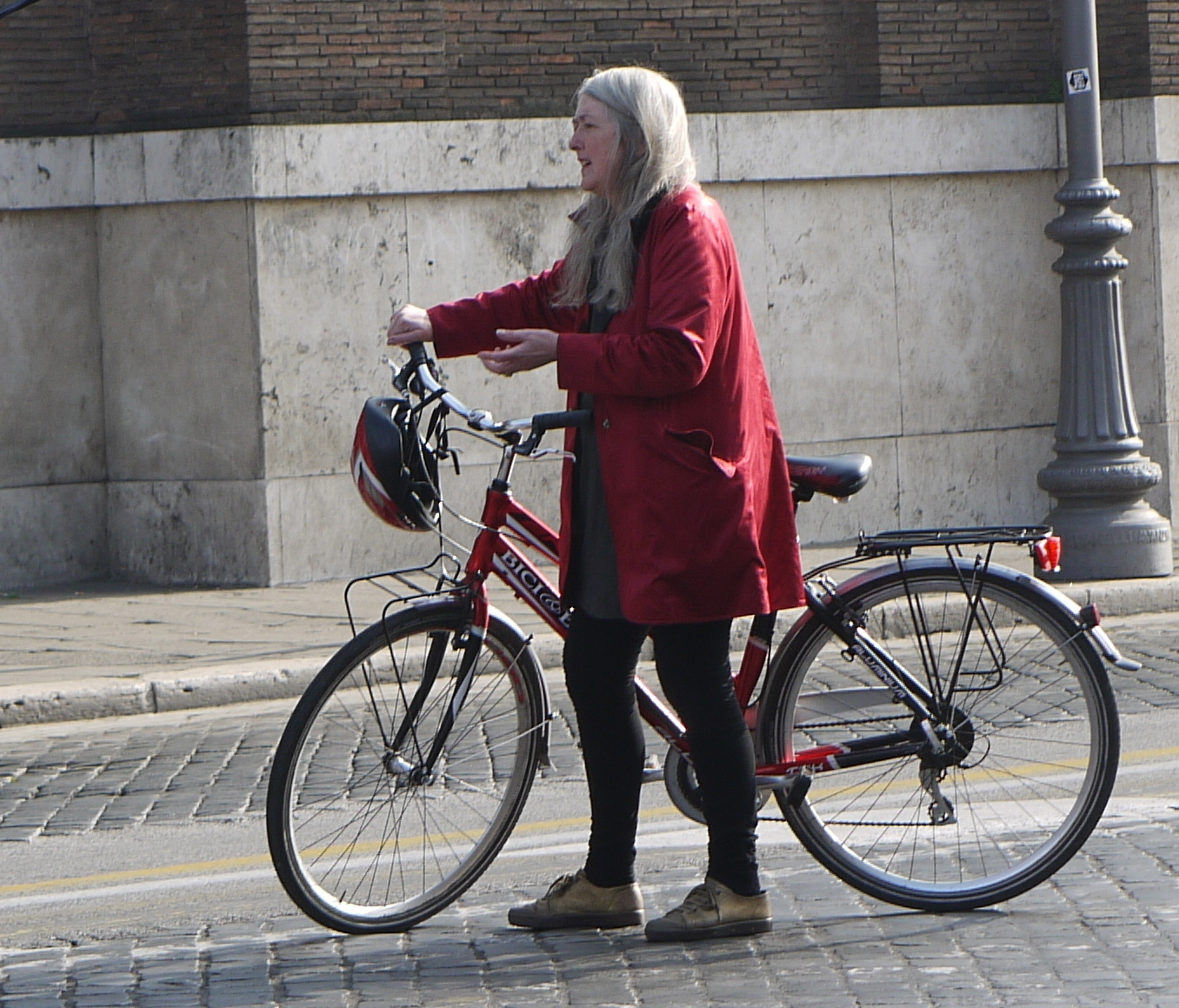
Beard filming in Rome, 2012

Beard married Robin Cormack, a classicist and art historian, in 1985. Their daughter, Zoe, is an anthropologist and historian based at the Centre for African Studies at the University of Oxford. Their son, Raphael Cormack, is an author, editor and translator specialising in Arabic Cultural History and Literature.

In 2000, Beard revealed in a review for the London Review of Books of a book on rape that she too had been raped, in 1978.

Her blog, A Don's Life, gets about 40,000 hits a day, according to The Independent (2013).

Beard retired from Cambridge in 2022 and started a scholarship as a "retirement present" worth £80,000 in order to support two disadvantaged students' classical studies at Cambridge.

== Beliefs ==
Beard has been a Labour Party member and describes herself as having a socialist disposition, being a committed feminist and an anti-racist.

In August 2014, Beard was one of 200 public figures who were signatories to a letter to The Guardian expressing their hope that Scotland would vote to remain part of the United Kingdom in September's referendum on that issue. She was a member of the Labour Party until Tony Blair became leader. In July 2015, Beard endorsed Jeremy Corbyn's campaign in the Labour Party leadership election. She said: "If I were a member of the Labour Party, I would vote for Corbyn. He actually seems to have some ideological commitment, which could get the Labour Party to think about what it actually stands for." For the 12 December 2019 general election, she was a proposer for the successful Cambridge Labour candidate Daniel Zeichner.

In 2015, Beard signed a letter to The Observer in support of universities resisting the no-platforming of speakers including gender-critical feminists such as Germaine Greer and Julie Bindel.

== Honours ==
- Fellow of the Society of Antiquaries (FSA) in 2005
- Wolfson History Prize (2009) for Pompeii: The Life of a Roman Town
- Corresponding Member of the Archaeological Institute of America in 2009
- Fellow of the British Academy (FBA) in 2010
- Member of the American Philosophical Society in 2012
- Officer of the Order of the British Empire (OBE) in the 2013 New Year Honours for "services to classical scholarship"
- National Book Critics Circle Award (Criticism) shortlist for Confronting the Classics (2013)
- Bodley Medal (2016)
- Princess of Asturias Award for Social Sciences (2016)
- Honorary degree from the University of St Andrews in 2013
- Honorary Doctor of Letters from the University of Kent in 2016
- Honorary degree from the Charles III University of Madrid in 2017
- Honorary degree from Radboud University in 2018
- Dame Commander of the Order of the British Empire (DBE) in the 2018 Birthday Honours for "services to the study of classical civilisations"
- Fellow of the Royal Society of Literature (FRSL) in 2019
- Doctor honoris causa in University of Santiago de Compostela, 2022

== Filmography ==
=== Film ===
Year	Title	Notes	Ref.
2023	Sultana's Dream	Cameo appearance	

=== Television ===
Year	Title	Notes
2010	Pompeii: Life and Death in a Roman Town	
2012	Meet the Romans with Mary Beard	3 episodes
2013	Caligula with Mary Beard	
2016	Pompeii: New Secrets Revealed	
2016	Rome: Empire Without Limit	4 episodes
2016	The Grand Tour	1 episode – as Self
2018	Julius Caesar Revealed	
2018	Civilisations	2 episodes
2020	Shock of the Nude	2 episodes
2020	Inside Culture	13 episodes – as Self, Presenter
2022	Mary Beard's Forbidden Art	2 episodes
2024	Meet the Roman Emperor with Mary Beard	1 episode – as Self

== Selected books ==
- Rome in the Late Republic (with Michael Crawford, 1985); ISBN 0-7156-2928-X
- The Good Working Mother's Guide (1989); ISBN 0-7156-2278-1
- Pagan Priests: Religion and Power in the Ancient World (as editor with John North, 1990); ISBN 0-7156-2206-4
- Classics: A Very Short Introduction (with John Henderson, 1995); ISBN 0-19-285313-9
- Religions of Rome (with John North and Simon Price, 1998); ISBN 0-521-30401-6 (vol. 1), ISBN 0-521-45015-2 (vol. 2)
- The Invention of Jane Harrison (Harvard University Press, 2000); ISBN 0-674-00212-1
- Classical Art from Greece to Rome (with John Henderson, 2001); ISBN 0-19-284237-4
- The Parthenon (Harvard University Press, 2002); ISBN 1-86197-292-X
- The Colosseum (with Keith Hopkins, Harvard University Press, 2005); ISBN 1-86197-407-8
- The Roman Triumph (Harvard University Press, 2007); ISBN 0-674-02613-6
- Pompeii: The Life of a Roman Town (2008); ISBN 1-86197-516-3 (US title: The Fires of Vesuvius: Pompeii Lost and Found; Harvard University Press)
- It's a Don's Life (Profile Books, 2009); ISBN 978-1846682513
- All in a Don's Day (Profile Books, 2012); ISBN 978-1846685361
- Confronting the Classics: Traditions, Adventures and Innovations (Profile Books, 2013 / Liveright Publishing, 2013); ISBN 1-78125-048-0
- Laughter in Ancient Rome: On Joking, Tickling, and Cracking Up (University of California Press, 2014); ISBN 0-520-27716-3
- SPQR: A History of Ancient Rome (Profile Books, 2015 / Liveright Publishing, 2015); ISBN 9780871404237
- Women & Power: A Manifesto (Profile Books, 2017 / Liveright Publishing, 2017); ISBN 978-1788160605
- Civilisations: How Do We Look / The Eye of Faith (Profile Books, 2018 / Liveright Publishing, 2018, published in the U.S. as How Do We Look: The Body, the Divine, and the Question of Civilization; ISBN 978-1781259993
- Twelve Caesars: Images of Power from the Ancient World to the Modern (Princeton University Press, 2021) ISBN 978-0691222363
- Emperor of Rome: Ruling the Ancient Roman World, Liveright (2023); ISBN 978-0871404220
- Talking Classics : the shock of the old. Profile Books. 2026.

———————

Bibliography notes

== See also ==
- Classical Tripos
