= Patrolmen's Benevolent Association Riot =

1992 rally of police officers opposing New York City Mayor David Dinkins

- Date: September 16, 1992
- Location: New York City Hall and Brooklyn Bridge, Manhattan, New York City
- Caused by: Reaction to proposed civilian oversight of police and reaction to Mayor David Dinkins' view of police
- Goals: Preventing Mayor David Dinkins and New York City Council from implementing police reform
- Methods: Rioting, protests, assault
- Result: The CCRB was reorganized and made independent from the police department in July 1993, Rudy Giuliani defeats David Dinkins in 1993 New York City mayoral election.

Lead figures
Phil Caruso; Rudy Giuliani; Guy Molinari	David Dinkins; Guillermo Linares

Casualties
- Charged: 2

The Patrolmen's Benevolent Association Riot, also known as the City Hall Riot, was a rally organized and sponsored by the Patrolmen's Benevolent Association of the City of New York (PBA) held on September 16, 1992, to protest mayor David Dinkins' proposal to create a civilian agency to investigate police misconduct. Approximately 4,000 NYPD officers took part in a protest that included blocking traffic on the Brooklyn Bridge and jumping over police barricades in an attempt to rush City Hall. Rioters were observed to be openly drinking, damaging cars, and physically attacking journalists from the New York Times on the scene. Rioters also chanted racial epithets towards the African-American Mayor Dinkins. The nearly 300 uniformed on-duty officers did little to control the riot.

Mayor Dinkins, who was not present at City Hall at the time, denounced the rally as "bordering on hooliganism" and accused PBA president Phil Caruso of inciting violence. Dinkins also accused Rudy Giuliani, who spoke at the rally, of inflaming tensions among rally attendees. Of the nearly 10,000 participating officers, Police Commissioner Raymond W. Kelly sanctioned 42 of them.

== Background ==
=== Police oversight ===
Citizen-activists in New York City had called for a civilian review board to exercise police oversight since the 1940s. Support for these measures grew following incidents of police brutality, particularly the 1943 police shooting of Robert Bandy and the 1964 shooting of James Powell. In 1966, after Mayor John Lindsay modified the existing police-controlled review board to turn over power to civilian appointees, the PBA launched a successful campaign to defeat the changes through a ballot referendum.

In 1992, Mayor David Dinkins, the city's first African American mayor, proposed a bill to change the leadership of the Civilian Complaint Review Board (CCRB), the oversight body that examined complaints of police misconduct, from half-police and half-civilian to all-civilian and make it independent of the New York Police Department. The bill was proposed amid an increase in support for independent, civilian-led police oversight commissions following the beating of Rodney King and the subsequent acquittal of the police officers in the case earlier that year.

=== Dinkins' relation with NYPD ===
While crime significantly decreased in New York City after 1990, the city was still perceived as dangerous, and tensions between the Mayor Dinkins and the police increased, particularly following the 1991 Crown Heights Riot and the Washington Heights Riot in July 1992. Following the Washington Heights riot, fueled by the death of Jose "Kiko" Garcia, an undocumented Dominican immigrant who was fatally shot by NYPD officer Michael O'Keefe, Dinkins attempted to defuse tensions by inviting Garcia's family to Gracie Mansion. The city's police felt betrayed by Dinkins' embrace of Garcia; officers interviewed by city tabloids called Garcia a "drug dealer" in reference to his past drug conviction, and claimed Dinkins' actions showed favoritism toward Mr. Garcia and bias against the police.

== Events ==
=== Initial rally ===
The rally was organized and sponsored by the New York City PBA. The rally was called to protest Mayor Dinkins' proposal to create the citizen-led review board for police misconduct, as well as his handling of riots against the police in Washington Heights the previous summer, and his refusal to provide the NYPD with semi-automatic weapons. The PBA obtained a permit for a protest confined to Murray Street, a road perpendicular to City Hall that was notably lined with Irish pubs. An estimated 10,000 officers attended the rally, most of whom were bused in from around the city by the PBA.

Protestors began marching around City Hall Park at 10:00 a.m. EDT, gathering around speeches from PBA President Phil Caruso, previous Mayoral candidate Rudy Giuliani, and NYPD officer Michael O'Keefe, who had recently cleared by a grand jury for his involvement in the shooting death of Jose "Kiko" Garcia that spurred the July riots in Washington Heights. In a speech delivered via microphone, Giuliani said "The reason the morale of the police department of the City of New York is so low is one reason and one reason alone: David Dinkins!"

Attendees alternated chants of "No justice! No police!" and "The Mayor's on Crack!", and donned t-shirts and signs with slogans like "Dear Mayor, have you hugged a drug dealer today," and "Dinkins, We Know Your True Color -- Yellow Bellied." Some signs featured cartoon images depicting Dinkins with racial caricatures such as large lips and nose and an Afro, with several calling Dinkins a "washroom attendant."

=== Escalation ===
The rally was originally contained to City Hall Park, but quickly started spilling out past the sawhorse barricades onto Broadway and Park Row. A crowd of 6,000 attendees remained engaged in a peaceful rally on Murray Street, however, by 10:50 a.m. EDT a group of around 4,000 attendees—many of which had been drinking at the bars along Murray Street during the speeches—broke out in chants of "Take the hall! Take the hall!" before storming the barriers and into the parking lot in front of City Hall. Some officers jumped on and damaged parked cars. Upon the deluge of rioters descending on City Hall, both Deputy Mayor Fritz Alexander and Acting Police Commissioner Ray Kelly summoned on-duty police officers to City Hall for crowd control.

With the on-duty police called to City Hall, several thousand protesting officers marched down to the Brooklyn Bridge around 11:40 a.m. EDT. Ten minutes later, around 2,000 protestors blocked traffic on the bridge in both directions until about 12:20 p.m. EDT, when the crowd began to dissipate. By 12:30 p.m. EDT, a handful of senior police commanders showed up to the bridge to provide crowd control, and traffic was reopened by 12:40 p.m. EDT.

By the time protesting officers reached the bridge, the riots turned violent. Several New York Times reporters and photographers were physically assaulted by officers; and a black cameraman for CBS News was repeatedly called "nigger" by several officers. As police were leaving the protest, several off-duty officers assaulted a man on the subway who had stepped on one of the officer's feet. The man claimed that when he attempted to apologize, the offended officer tried to punch him, and that he cut the officer's face with a razor blade in self defense. Six officers then reportedly beat and kicked him, leaving the man with a broken jaw. New York Post columnist Jimmy Breslin, who was covering the event, claimed he witnessed an officer in a PBA shirt saying to a female television reporter, "Here, let me grab your ass," as well as officers shouting racial epithets towards Mayor Dinkins.

== Aftermath ==
=== Arrests and inquiries ===
No arrests occurred at the scene of the riots. The riots spawned two inquiries; one was led by Manhattan District Attorney Robert Morgenthau and another by Acting Police Commissioner Ray Kelly. A caucus of African-American NYPD officers, including eventual Mayor Eric Adams, called for a special prosecutor, arguing that the DA's investigation would be tainted by police influence; Mayor Dinkins pushed back on calling for a special prosecutor.

Of the estimated 10,000 officers involved in the protest and subsequent riot, 87 officers were later identified from witness accounts and visual images, and 42 officers faced disciplinary hearings for possible misconduct charges (but not criminal charges). Two of those officers were suspended; one on-duty officer charged with opening the barricades to protesters and uttering racial slurs, and one off-duty officer who had blocked traffic on the Brooklyn Bridge. Another 26 off-duty cops identified as blocking bridge traffic faced disciplinary proceedings. Among the 42 officers facing discipline were 13 on-duty officers assigned to control the crowd and a helicopter pilot who blared his chopper's horn in support of the protesters. In addition, two officers who assaulted a man on the subway following the riot were charged with felony assault, leading to one conviction on a misdemeanor charge that led to the officer's dismissal.

=== Reactions ===
Following the riot, Mayor Dinkins condemned the participating officers, saying "If some officers in full view of a camera and public and their superiors or officers would use racial slurs, yelling 'n-----s,' and some of the signs they were carrying ... I fear how they would behave when they are out in the streets." Dinkins also blamed Giuliani for his involvement, who he claimed egged on the crowd for opportunistic purposes, saying "he's seizing upon a fragile circumstance in our city for his own political gain." Acting Police Commissioner Ray Kelly said that the riots and lack of arrests following it, "raised serious questions about the department's willingness and ability to police itself."

Rudy Giuliani pushed back against Dinkins' accusation, saying that his comments were "desperate and offensive," and claimed that he had urged the rioters to move away from City Hall. Giuliani sympathized with the rioters and blamed Dinkins for the unrest, saying "one of the reasons those police officers might have lost control is that we have a mayor who invites riots."

PBA President Phil Caruso conceded that the protest "got out of hand", and blamed the riots and violence on both Mayor Dinkins and City Councilman Guillermo Linares, a Dominican-American representative from the Washington Heights neighborhood who was critical of the police in the wake of the Garcia shooting and subsequent riots the previous July. However, Caruso sympathized with the actions of the rioting officers, saying "sometimes, in order to convey a message clearly and graphically, especially on the part of police officers, you have to see it, feel the intensity."

=== CCRB ===
Despite objections from the PBA and NYPD, the CCRB was reorganized and made independent from the police department in July 1993. Despite the rally's intention to dissuade support for the changes to the CCRB, the ensuing riots ultimately increased support for additional police oversight. City Council Speaker Peter Vallone Sr., who initially opposed Dinkins' plan to reform the CCRB, later supported a compromise bill on the proposal following the events of the riot.

== See also ==
- New York City Police Riot of 1857
- History of the New York City Police Department
- List of incidents of civil unrest in New York City
