= Straw Hat Riot =

1922 riot in New York City

The Straw Hat Riot of 1922 was a riot that occurred in New York City at the end of summer as a result of unwritten rules in men's fashions at the time, and a tradition of taunting people who had failed to stop wearing straw hats after autumn began. Originating as a series of minor riots, it spread due to youths choosing to harass men wearing straw hats past the unofficial date that was deemed socially acceptable, September 15. It lasted eight days, leading to many arrests and some injuries.

== Background ==
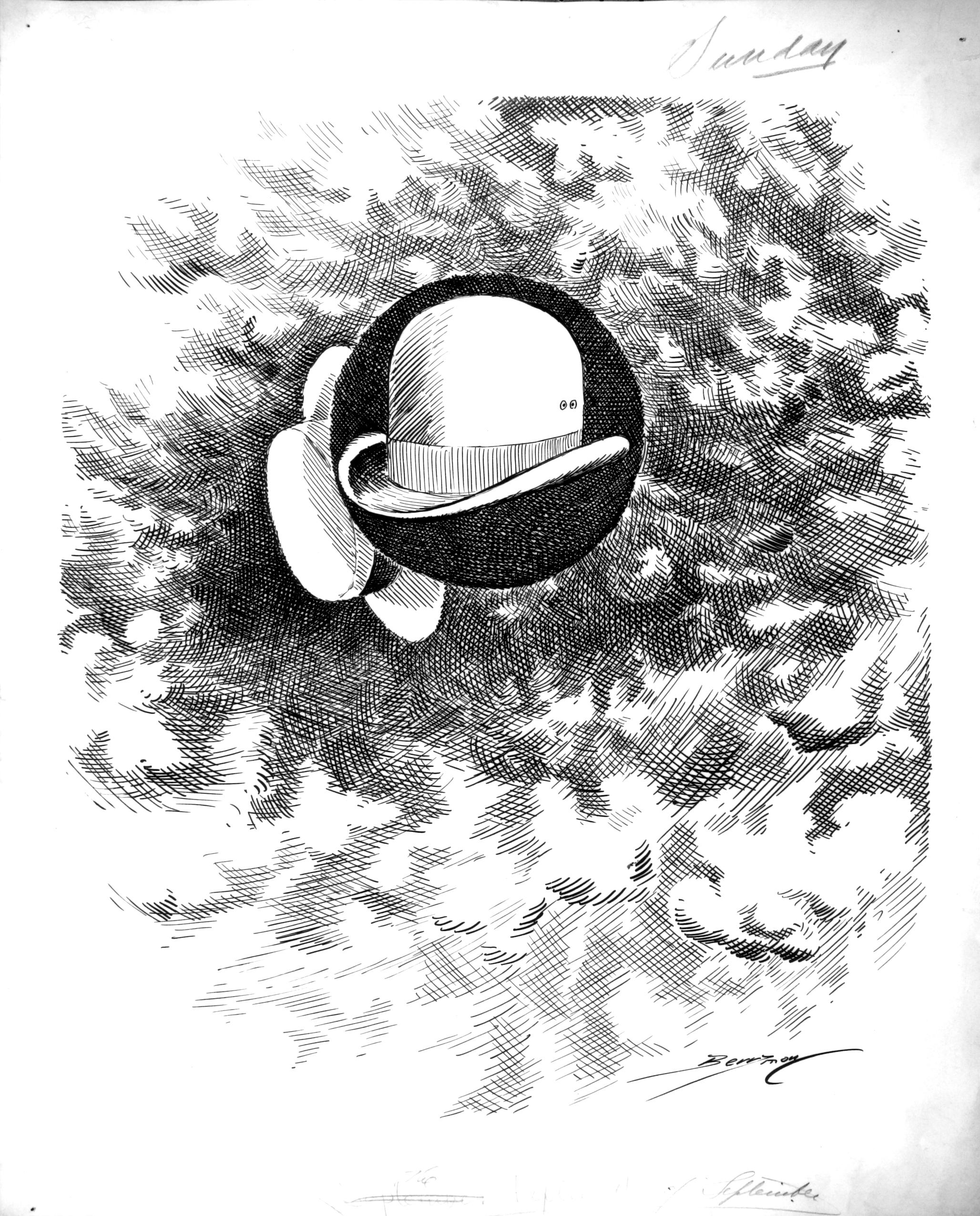
1912 cartoon by Clifford K. Berryman showing the eclipse of straw hats by felt hats on September 15

Straw hats had appeared in the 19th century as summertime wear, usually in connection to summer sporting events such as boating (hence the name boater). Soft Panama hats were likewise derived from tropical attire but began to be worn as informal summer attire. Initially it was not considered good form for men to wear these in big cities even at the height of summer (women's hats were different). By the early 20th century, straw boaters were considered acceptable day attire in North American cities at the height of summer even for businessmen, but there was an unwritten rule that one was not supposed to wear a straw hat past September 15 (which was known as "Felt Hat Day").

This date was arbitrary; earlier it had been September 1, but it eventually shifted to mid-month. It was socially acceptable for stockbrokers to destroy each other's hats, due to the fact that they were “companions”, but it was not acceptable for total strangers. If any man was seen wearing a straw hat, he was, at minimum, subjecting himself to ridicule, and it was a tradition for youths to knock straw hats off wearers' heads and stomp on them. This tradition became well established, and newspapers of the day would often warn people of the impending approach of the fifteenth, when men would have to switch to felt or silk hats. Hat bashing was only socially acceptable after September 15, but there were multiple occasions leading up to this date where the police had to intervene and stop teenagers.

== Riot ==
The riot itself began on September 13, 1922, two days before the supposed unspoken date, when a group of youths decided to get an early jump on the tradition. This group began in the former "Mulberry Bend" area of Manhattan by removing and stomping hats worn by factory workers who were employed in the area. The more innocuous stomping turned into a brawl when the youths tried to stomp a group of dock workers' hats, and the dock workers fought back. The brawl soon stopped traffic on the Manhattan Bridge and was eventually broken up by police, leading to some arrests.

Although the initial brawl was broken up by police, the fights continued to escalate the next evening. Gangs of teenagers prowled the streets wielding large sticks, sometimes with a nail driven through the top for hooking hats, looking for pedestrians wearing straw hats and beating those who resisted. One man claimed that his hat was taken and the group who had taken his hat joined a mob of about 1,000 that was snatching hats all along Amsterdam Avenue. Several off-duty police officers found themselves caught up in the brawl when rioters attempted to snatch their hats. Two or three boys were brought to the police station by pedestrians who said that their straw hats had been smashed; the boys were arrested.

Several victims were injured, one seriously enough to require hospitalization and another was "nearly blinded".

== Aftermath ==
Many of those taken to court following arrests related to the hat-snatching frenzy opted to be fined rather than serve time in jail. The longest recorded time one of the teens was sent to jail was three days served by an "A. Silverman", who was sentenced by Magistrate Peter A. Hatting during night court.

In one incident, a group of boys armed with sticks attacked people near 109th Street. Seven youths brought to the East 104th Street police station were under 15 and were not arrested. Their parents were summoned to administer corporal punishment. After the station dealt with the original riot, all stations were told to keep an eye out for hat-snatching teenagers. E.C. Jones claimed to have seen around 1,000 teenagers in a mob roaming around Amsterdam Avenue. One victim, Harry Gerber, was kicked so badly he had to be hospitalized.

That the activity died out is probably connected with the disappearance of the tradition of the seasonal switch from straw to felt hats. While Panama hats remained in fashion during the 1930s, the straw boater became less fashionable.

Manufacture of straw hats for men continued but the shapes of the hats were more similar to hats such as the Panama, trilby or fedora. By the 1950s the classic straw boater was virtually extinct as a garment, except in specialized circumstances such as the uniform of certain English public schools or university and college sportswear.

== See also ==
- Zoot Suit Riot
- Hard Hat Riot
- List of incidents of civil unrest in New York City
- List of incidents of civil unrest in the United States
