= Carla Peterson =

Carla Peterson may refer to:

- Carla Peterson (academic) (born 1944), professor of English at the University of Maryland
- Carla Peterson (actress) (born 1974), Argentine actress
