= 1862 Brooklyn riot =

1862 riot in Brooklyn, New York, US

Coordinates: 40°41′12″N 74°0′11″W

- Sedgwick Street riot Part of mass racial violence in the United States
- Date: August 4, 1862
- Location: Cobble Hill, Brooklyn, New York, United States
- Caused by: Anti-African American sentiment among Irish American workers
- Result: Riots suppressed by police

Casualties
- Arrested: 8 rioters, 1 worker

A riot occurred in the Cobble Hill neighborhood of Brooklyn, New York (not yet a part of New York City), United States, on August 4, 1862. It involved a group of White Americans, mostly of Irish descent, targeting a group of about 20 Black American workers at a tobacco factory on Sedgwick Street. The New York City Police Department was able to quell the riot with only some minor injuries and property damage.

Two days prior to the riot, a fight occurred at a liquor store near two tobacco factories between a White and Black man. Following the fight, anti-Black rumors circulated in the primarily Irish American neighborhood of Cobble Hill, and the animus of some in the neighborhood was directed towards Black workers. Heightened tensions were not unusual, as the Irish often regarded Black workers as economic competitors. On the morning of August 4, a mob congregated outside of one of the factories, breaking windows and attacking the people inside. Police arrived and were able to disperse the mob, douse a fire that some rioters had set, and arrest several individuals.

Historians have classified the riot as part of a broader trend of violence towards Black Americans in the New York area during the time that included such events as the New York City draft riots the following year.

== Background ==
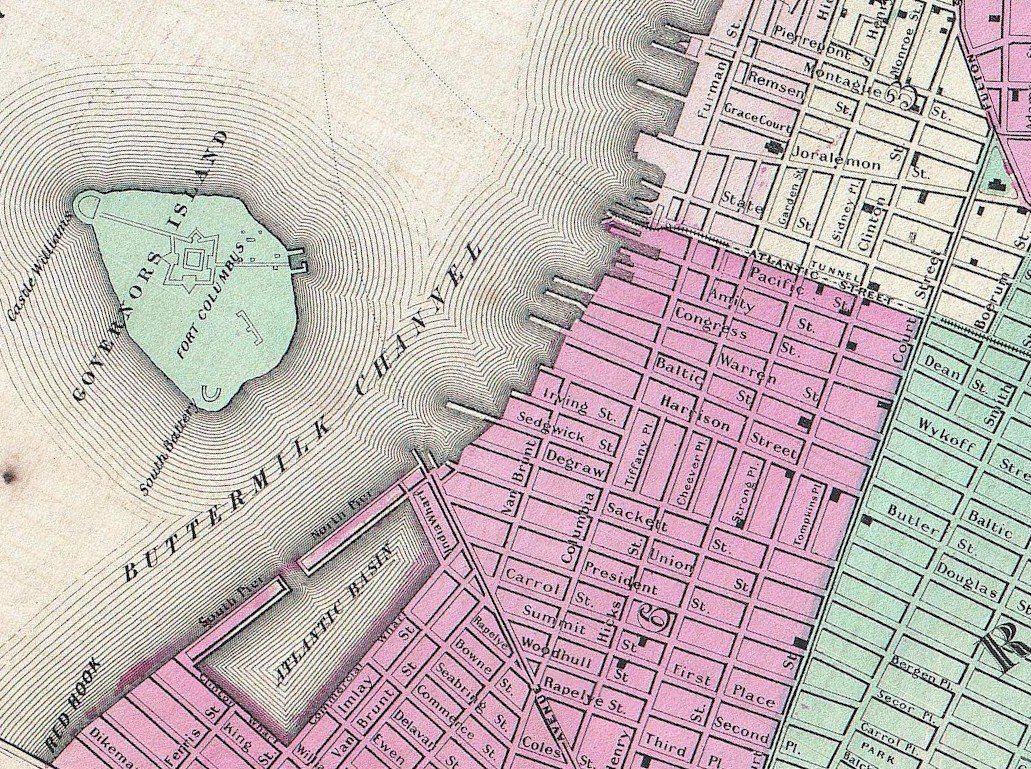
Detail of the Brooklyn waterfront in 1862. Sedgwick Street is at the center of the image.

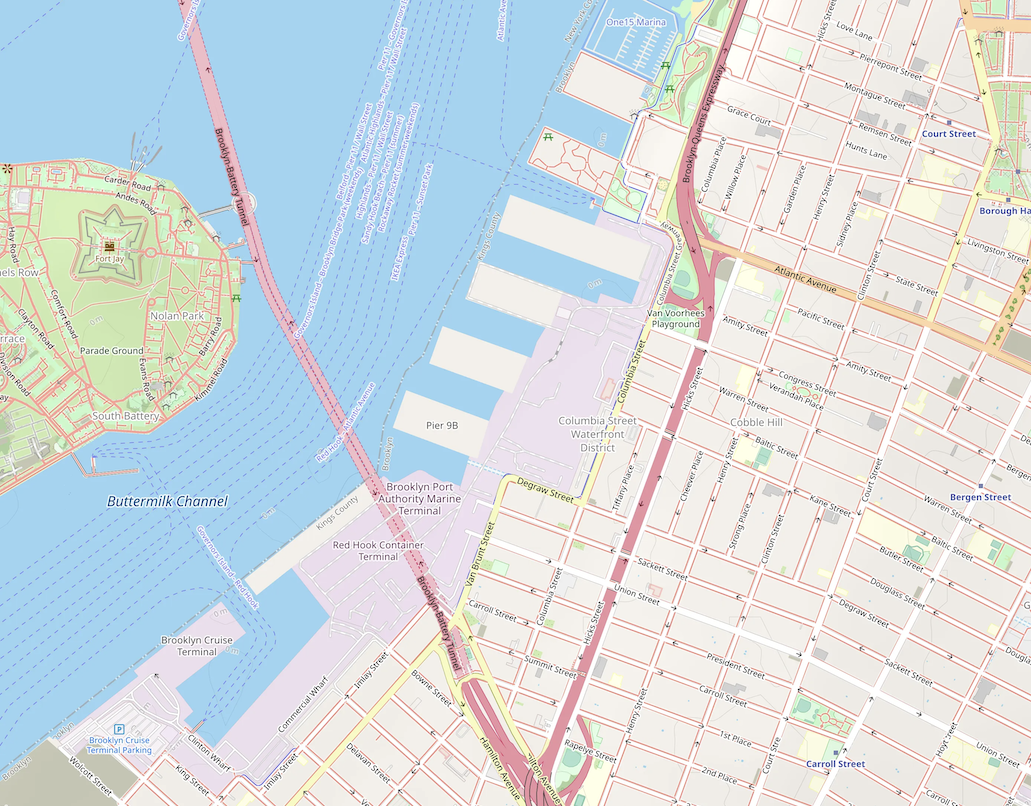
Detail of the same area in 2025. Sedgwick Street and several surrounding streets no longer exist, having been subsumed into the Columbia Street Waterfront District.

In the 1860s, two tobacco factories, operated by the Lorillard Tobacco Company and T. Watson & Company, were situated near each other on Sedgwick Street, in the Cobble Hill neighborhood in Brooklyn. By 1862, these two plants had been in operation for about eight to nine years. At the time, this South Brooklyn neighborhood was made up largely of working class Irish Americans. However, both factories employed both African Americans and White Americans, with the two groups of workers operating under separate shop foremen and not usually directly interacting with each other. In total, the two factories employed roughly 100 black workers and 200 white workers, with the black workers earning a weekly wage of about $14 (equivalent to $452 in 2025) and the white workers receiving $10 ($323 in 2025). Most of the white employees were Irish, while most of the black workers were freedmen. Almost all of the African American workers commuted to the factory from outside of the neighborhood, from places such as New York City or other Brooklyn neighborhoods, like Weeksville. They consisted primarily of women and children.

British misgovernance in 19th century Ireland, including the Great Famine and the restrictive penal laws, had prompted mass immigration to the United States. In the early part of the century, it was not uncommon for Irish immigrants to work alongside free Negroes. According to historians Glenn C. Altschuler and Stuart M. Blumin, Irish workers were conflicted about working alongside African Americans, as many feared the competition for employment that increased black involvement in the labor force would bring. During the first half of the 19th century, Irish Americans engaged in several major acts of violence against African Americans, including the 1834 Philadelphia race riot and the 1838 destruction of Pennsylvania Hall, an abolitionist venue in Philadelphia. This hostility continued during the American Civil War, with Altschuler and Blumin noting that Irish Americans in the Northern United States were resistant to emancipation. In Brooklyn, these fears were inflamed by Copperhead newspapers and politicians who alleged that the emancipation of black slaves in the Southern United States and subsequent migration northwards would hurt the Irish workers economically.

== Riot ==
On the afternoon of Saturday, August 2, 1862, a fight broke out between a black man and a white man outside of a liquor store in South Brooklyn, at the same intersection that Lorillard's factory was located on. The scuffle was shortly broken up by a police officer. While sources differ on where the two men worked, (Note: An 1862 article of The Pilot, the official organ of the Roman Catholic Archdiocese of Boston, specifies only that the black man involved in the fight worked for Lorillard's tobacco factory. A 2020 article on HistoryNet states that the two involved in the fight worked for Watson's factory, while a 2022 book by historians Stuart M. Blumin and Glenn C. Altschuler states that both men worked for a nearby resin factory.) the animus of many Irish Americans in the neighborhood was quickly directed at the two tobacco factories and their African American employees. According to The New York Times, later that night, a group of Irish American men yelled and threw stones at a group of black women and children who were working at the factories, though without causing any serious injuries. Around the same time, rumors began to circulate among the white population that some African Americans in the area had made insulting comments towards white women. According to academic Carla Peterson, contemporary newspapers in the area, including the Brooklyn Daily Eagle, the Brooklyn Daily Times, The New York Times, and the New-York Tribune cite other factors as contributing to this increased hostility, including rumors that some African Americans were planning to move into the neighborhood or had offered to work for wages less than what the Irish workers were being paid.

At about 8 a.m. on Monday, August 4, William Egner, a foreman at Lorillard's plant, said that he saw some young man hanging around the street corner and had heard rumors that some sort of confrontation was planned for the day related to Friday's fight. Egner then notified Lorillard, Watson, and a local tobacco merchant named Charles Kelsey. Around 10 a.m., the three went off to secure police protection, and subsequently, police officers were stationed inside the factories. One of the foremen at Lorillard's factory had sent home all of the black employees for the day, additionally barricading the door and locking the windows. Many of the black male workers at Watson's were not at work that day, as they were attending an emancipation rally in Brooklyn. While the foreman at Lorillard's had recommended that Watson's also send home their remaining black workers, this did not occur. As a result, on that day, there were about 5 black men and 20 black women and children working. (Note: Multiple sources give this breakdown for the number of workers present at the time. However, in contemporary reporting from The New York Times, it was reported that there were 5 men and 15 women and children working at the time.) That morning, a group of white men congregated at Lorillard's and demanded entry, though they were denied. However, in a meeting with the mob, the owner of the factory agreed to the mob's demands that African Americans be barred from working at his factory. Following this, at around 1 p.m., the mob moved to Watson's, some wielding pitchforks and yelling expletives as they did. The mob, which was made up largely of Irish Americans, numbered at least 50 in strength and may have included upwards of 1,000. (Note: Sources vary considerably in the number of rioters. On the lower end, a 2011 book by academic Carla Peterson states that the mob consisted of "[a]bout fifty to seventy-five Irishmen". A 2020 article on HistoryNet states that the mob consisted of "400 whites", while a 2016 book by historian John Strausbaugh gives the number as "a few hundred". Contemporary reporting in The New York Times further states that there were between four and five hundred individuals. On the higher end, an 1862 article in The Pilot states that the mob consisted of "over a thousand" people.) As it was around lunchtime, many of the white workers had gone home to eat, while the African American workers, who lived further away from the factory, remained on the factory premises.

The mob laid siege on the factory, throwing bricks and stones at the building while attacking the people inside with their pitchforks, breaking every window on the building in the process. The black workers fled upstairs to the second floor, where they barricaded themselves against the mob. While the mob was held back from the second floor for about an hour, one black worker, Charles Baker, was seized by the mob and severely beaten. Police who had been stationed inside the factory engaged with the mob and prevented them from reaching the second floor. These officers were soon joined by reinforcements from nearby precincts. Failing to reach the second floor, the mob attempted to burn down the building. The mob lit on fire a pan of tar and soon had some of the factory woodwork in flames, though police were able to quickly extinguish the fire. Ultimately, the mob was repelled by the police after the violent confrontation. In the end, several officers suffered minor injuries, while one black worker was severely wounded. According to a contemporary account, one police officer suffered a pitchfork wound in his shoulder, while another had been attacked by one of the black workers who feared the police were going to arrest him. Eight white rioters were arrested, while Baker was also arrested for hitting a police officer during the fray.

== Aftermath ==
Following the riot, the police informed the factory workers that they should be safe to resume their work under police protection, though many opted to instead go home out of fear for their safety. The police escorted many of them home. Watson would later permanently close his factory at Sedgwick Street, with plans to relocate to a larger facility. According to Peterson, newspapers covering the event were largely sympathetic towards the victims and criticized the mob, with The New York Times accusing the rioters of working in the services of Jefferson Davis, the president of the Confederate States of America.

=== Legal proceedings ===
Following the riot, legal proceedings commenced against the arrested rioters, which included Richard Baylis, Thomas Clark, Joseph Flood, Patrick Keenan, John Long, Michael Meagher, William Morris, and Elias P. Weider. Keenan, who owned a liquor store in Brooklyn and had been a candidate for alderman in a previous election, was identified as the leader of the rioters, and it was he who had ordered the factory to be burned. The New York Times also noted that more arrests could be forthcoming. In addition to the rioters, the superintendent of police for Brooklyn charged that some of his own officers had acted with negligence during the riot, though following testimony from the factory owners that defended the officers' actions, these charges were dismissed. Additionally, charges against Baker were dropped. A preliminary hearing for the rioters was eventually held on August 11. Initially, the lawyer representing Keenan requested that he be tried separately, though the judge overseeing the case denied this request. Over the next several weeks, the case was delayed and rescheduled numerous times, and according to Peterson, newspaper coverage of the trial largely tapered off by August 19. In late September, after a hearing occurred in which neither the plaintiffs nor their legal counsel were present, the judge dismissed the case. By this point, several of the accused had enlisted in the Union army.

== Legacy ==
Concerning the severity of the event, an 1862 article in The New York Times labeled it as "one of the most atrocious riots of modern time", while the Brooklyn Daily Eagle called it "one of the most disgraceful riots, which has ever happened in this city". In a 2024 article for Gothamist, journalists Alison Stewart and Luke Green called the riot the "first recorded act of white terrorism in that part of Brooklyn", while historian John Kuo Wei Tchen called it a "race riot". In his analysis of the riot, Tchen views it as one of several related to the economic competition between Irish Americans and other minorities in the United States. According to historian John Strausbaugh, the riot was the first in a series of race-based incidents of violence in the New York metropolitan area. In the weeks following the riot, there were reports of roving gangs of White Americans attacking African Americans in the area, and from late 1862 to mid-1863, there were multiple labor strikes along the docks that saw violent confrontations between Irish American strikers and African American strikebreakers. Several commentators have noted similarities between the 1862 riot and the later New York City draft riots of 1863, with several highlighting that both riots involved the targeting of African Americans by working-class Irish Americans.

== See also ==
- African Americans in New York City
- List of incidents of civil unrest in New York City
- List of incidents of civil unrest in the United States
- Racism against African Americans

== Sources ==
- Blumin, Stuart M.; Altschuler, Glenn C. (2022). The Rise and Fall of Protestant Brooklyn: An American Story. Ithaca, New York: Cornell University Press. ISBN 978-1-5017-6552-0. OCLC 1281791907.
- Goldstein, Norm (September 7, 2020). "Abolitionist Brooklyn: A Sanctuary City Before Its Time". HistoryNet. World History Group. Archived from the original on September 16, 2024.
- Ignatiev, Noel (March 17, 2010). "The Divide Between Blacks and the Irish". The Root. The Slate Group. Archived from the original on March 17, 2024.
- Peterson, Carla L. (2011). Black Gotham: A Family History of African Americans in Nineteenth-Century New York City. New Haven, Connecticut: Yale University Press. ISBN 978-0-300-16255-4. OCLC 707082775.
- "The Irrepressible Conflict". The Pilot. Roman Catholic Archdiocese of Boston. August 16, 1862. p. 2. Archived from the original on January 10, 2025.
- Stewart, Alison; Green, Luke (October 5, 2024). "A new book looks at the history of free Black Brooklyn, and how it shaped the borough". Gothamist. New York Public Radio. Archived from the original on October 8, 2024.
- Strausbaugh, John (2016). City of Sedition: The History of New York City During the Civil War. New York City: Twelve. ISBN 978-1-4555-8417-8. OCLC 1019488235.
- Tchen, John Kuo Wei (1997) [1996]. "Quimbo Appo's Fear of Fenians: Chinese-Irish-Anglo Relations in New York City". In Bayor, Ronald H.; Meagher, Timothy J. (eds.). The New York Irish (Johns Hopkins Paperbacks ed.). Baltimore: Johns Hopkins University Press. pp. 125–152. ISBN 978-0-8018-5764-5. OCLC 32625550.
