= 1989 New York City mayoral election =

- November 7, 1989
- Registered: 3,183,741
- Turnout: 1,899,845; 59.67% (▲18.48 pp)
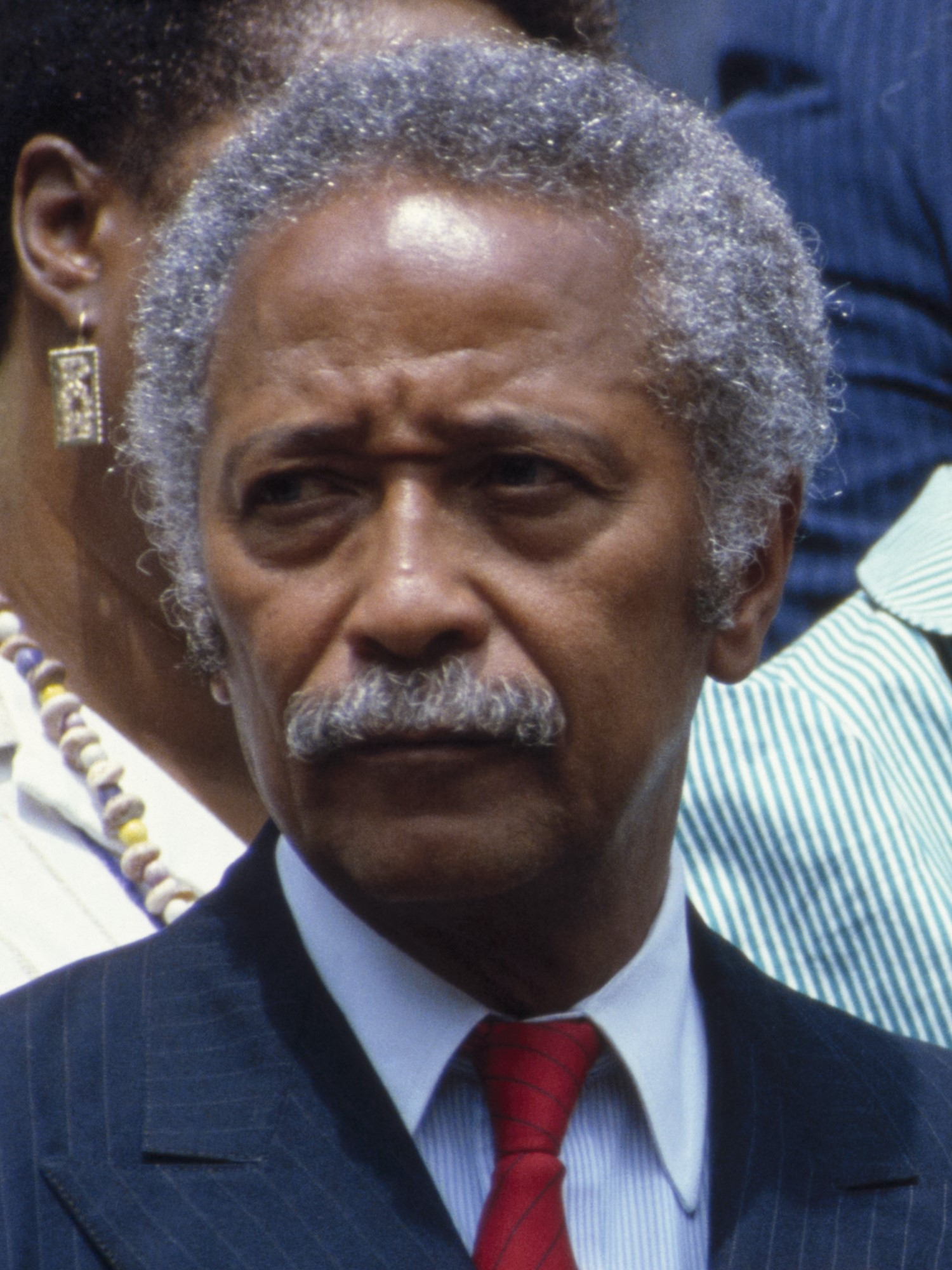

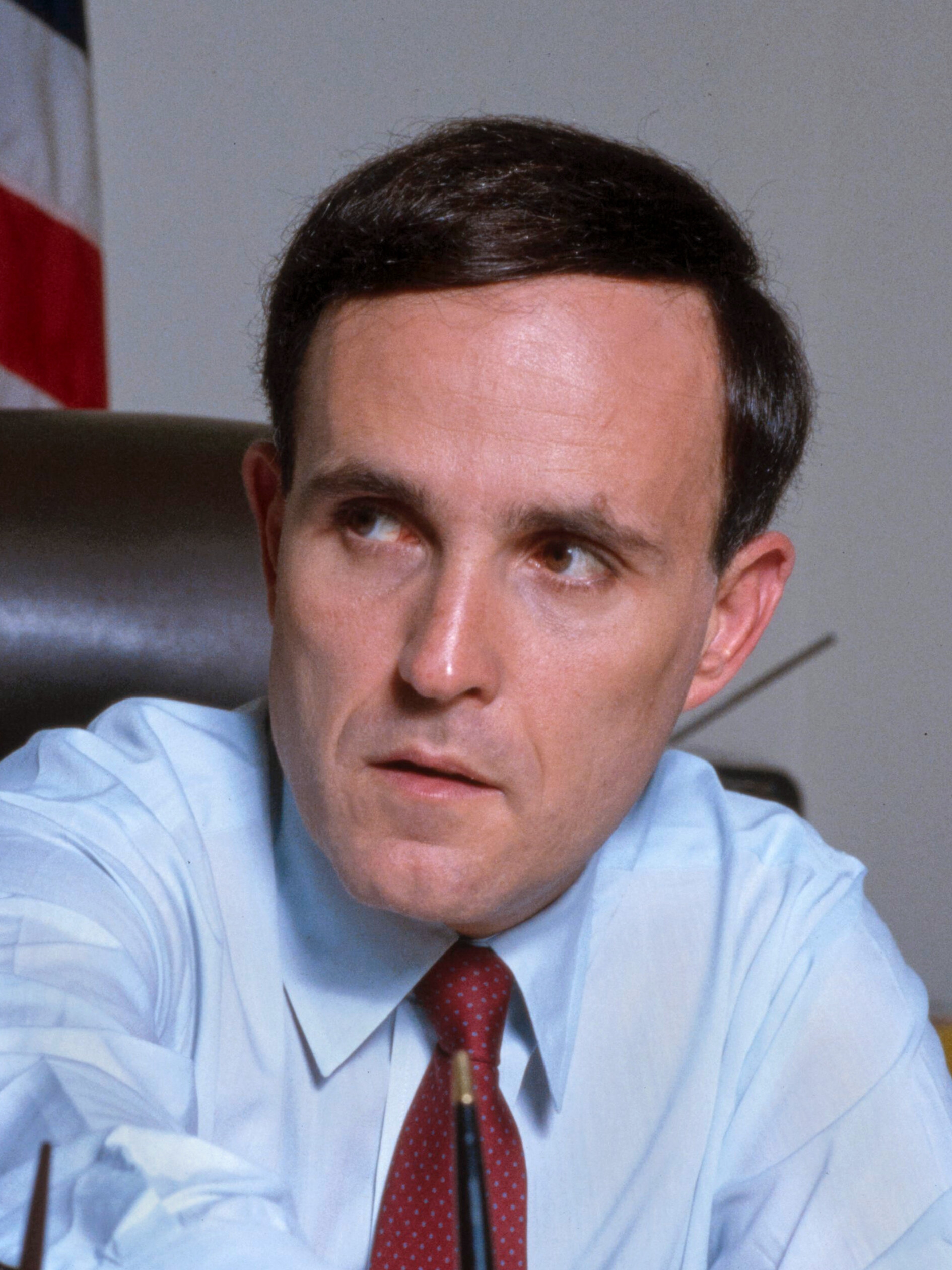
Candidate	David Dinkins	Rudy Giuliani
Party	Democratic	Republican
Alliance		Liberal
Popular vote	917,544	870,464
Percentage	50.42%	47.84%
- Dinkins: 40–50% 50–60% 60–70% 70–80% 80–90% >90% Giuliani: 50–60% 60–70% 70–80% 80–90%
Mayor before election
Ed Koch
Democratic
Elected Mayor
David Dinkins
Democratic

The 1989 New York City mayoral election was held on Tuesday, November 7.

Incumbent Mayor Ed Koch, who had served since 1978, ran for an unprecedented fourth term in office but was defeated in the Democratic Party primary by Manhattan Borough President David Dinkins. Dinkins went on to narrowly defeat U.S. Attorney for the Southern District of New York Rudy Giuliani, the candidate of both the Republican Party and Liberal Party of New York. Dinkins won with 50.42% of the vote to Giuliani's 47.84%.

Whereas the two preceding mayoral elections of the 1980s had been landslide victories for Koch, who had not lost a single borough and had received the co-endorsement of the Republican Party in 1981, this election was a closely contested race. Dinkins won majorities in the Bronx, Manhattan, and Brooklyn, while Giuliani carried Queens and won a landslide on Staten Island. At the time, this was the strongest showing for a candidate on the Republican line since 1965 (not counting Koch's 1981 cross-endorsement), and the first since then that a candidate on the Republican line managed 30 percent of the vote.

Four years later, in the 1993 election, Dinkins and Giuliani would face each other again in a re-match and Dinkins would lose to Giuliani in his bid for re-election. Democrats would not win a mayoral election in New York City again until 2013. This was the first of two elections in a row where the incumbent lost re-election.

== Democratic primary ==
=== Candidates ===
- David Dinkins, Manhattan Borough President
- Harrison J. Goldin, New York City Comptroller
- Ed Koch, incumbent Mayor since 1978
- Richard Ravitch, former chairman of the Metropolitan Transportation Authority

==== Declined ====
- Andrew Stein, President of the New York City Council

=== Polling ===
Poll source	Date(s)	Sample size	David Dinkins	Harrison Goldin	Ed Koch	Andrew Stein
Johnson/Singer Inc.	Dec. 10, 1988	1,204	34%	6%	29%	17%

=== Results ===
Results by borough

Results by State Assembly district

Dinkins: 40–50% 50–60% 60–70% 70–80% 80–90% >90%
Koch: 40–50% 50–60% 60–70% 70–80% 80–90%

Democratic primary results
Party	Candidate	Votes	%
Democratic	David Dinkins	547,901	50.71%
Democratic	Ed Koch (incumbent)	456,313	42.23%
Democratic	Richard Ravitch	47,534	4.40%
Democratic	Harrison J. Goldin	28,809	2.67%
Total votes		1,080,557	100.0%

== Republican primary ==
=== Candidates ===
- Rudy Giuliani, U.S. Attorney for the Southern District of New York
- Ronald Lauder, son of Estée Lauder and former U.S. Ambassador to Austria

=== Results ===
Results by State Assembly district Giuliani: 50%–60%; 60%–70%; 70%–80%; Lauder: 50%–60%

Republican primary results
Party	Candidate	Votes	%
Republican	Rudy Giuliani	77,150	67.02%
Republican	Ronald Lauder	37,960	32.98%
Total votes		115,110	100.0%

== General election ==
=== Debates ===
1989 New York City mayoral election debates
No.	Date	Host	Moderator	Link	Democratic	Republican	Right to Life
Key: P Participant A Absent N Not invited I Invited W Withdrawn							
Key: P Participant A Absent N Not invited I Invited W Withdrawn					David Dinkins	Rudy Giuliani	Henry F. Hewes
1	Nov. 1, 1989	El Diario La Prensa; National Hispanic Council on Aging; WADO, WPIX, WXTV	Orlando Garcia	C-SPAN	P	A	P
2	Nov. 5, 1989	WNBC-TV	Gabe Pressman	C-SPAN	P	P	P

=== Candidates ===
- Warren L. Baum (Libertarian)
- David Dinkins, Manhattan Borough President (Democratic)
- Lenora Fulani, psychologist, activist and candidate for President of the United States in 1988 (New Alliance)
- Rudy Giuliani, U.S. Attorney for the Southern District of New York (Republican and Liberal)
- James E. Harris (Socialist Workers)
- Henry F. Hewes, consultant (Right to Life)
- Ronald S. Lauder, son of Estée Lauder and former U.S. Ambassador to Austria (Conservative)

=== Results ===
General election results
Party	Candidate	Votes	%	±%
Democratic	David Dinkins	917,544	50.42%	▼27.6
Republican	Rudy Giuliani	815,387	44.80%	▲35.7
Liberal	Rudy Giuliani	55,077	3.02%	▼7.1
Total	Rudy Giuliani	870,464	47.84%	N/A
Right to Life	Henry F. Hewes	17,460	0.96%	▼0.3
Conservative	Ronald S. Lauder	9,271	0.51%	▼2.5
New Alliance	Lenora Fulani	1,732	0.10%	▼0.5
Socialist Workers	James E. Harris	1,671	0.09%	▼0.06
Libertarian	Warren L. Baum	1,118	0.06%	N/A
Total votes		1,819,260	100.0%	
Democratic hold				

=== By borough ===
General election
		Manhattan	The Bronx	Brooklyn	Queens	Staten Island	Total
Dinkins' lead over Giuliani		+ 97,600	+ 72,471	+ 39,071	– 94,670	– 67,392	+ 47,080
Democratic	David N. Dinkins	255,286	172,271	276,903	190,096	22,988	917,544
Republican – Liberal – Independent	Rudy Giuliani	157,686	99,800	237,832	284,766	90,380	870,464
Right to Life	Henry Hewes	3,025	2,571	4,140	5,647	2,077	17,460
Conservative	Ronald S. Lauder	1,701	1,139	2,328	3,062	1,041	9,271
	Others	1,904	714	1,197	947	194	4,956
							1,819,695
