= 1917 New York City Food Riot =

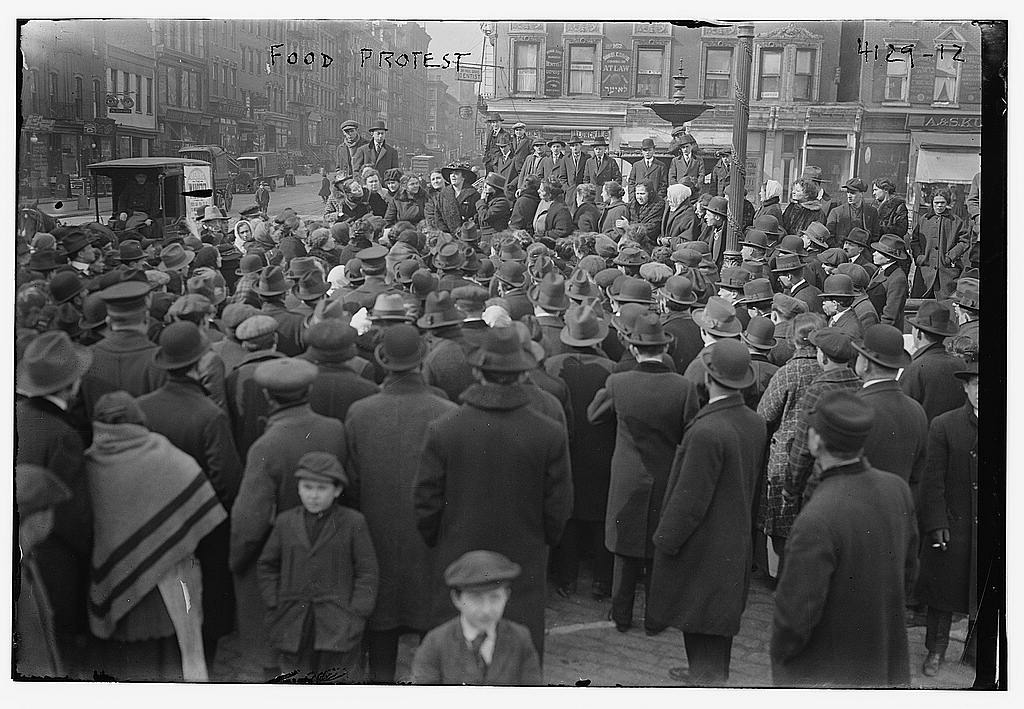
Marie Ganz speaking during the food riots of 1917

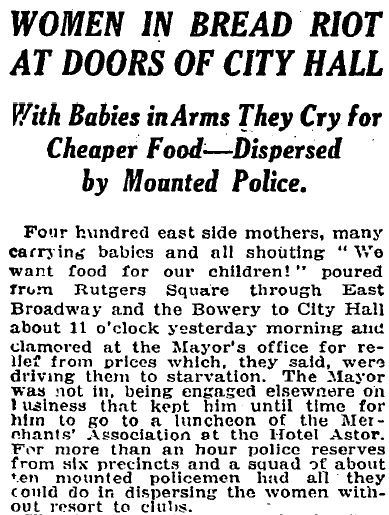
Food Riots of 1917 in the New York Times on February 21, 1917

The New York City Food Riot of 1917 were a series of demonstrations and riots which began on February 19, 1917, after a mob composed mostly of women confronted store and pushcart owners over the raising of prices following the shortages of World War I.

== History ==
Ida Harris, president of the socialist Mothers Vigilance Committee, and anarchist labour organizer Marie Ganz, led the crowds through Manhattan's Lower East Side. After another gathering on February 20, Ganz was arrested for "failing to comply with orders to stop stirring up the crowd."

On February 22, the women stormed the city's poultry markets, assaulting customers and destroying chickens.

On February 24, thousands of New Yorkers marched on Madison Square, where "several high-profile speakers addressed the crowd."

The food riots were effective in that "by the beginning of March, the city responded to the crisis by securing thousands of pounds of low-cost produce and wholesalers lowered prices." Although this succeeded in ending the riots, food prices continued to "fluctuate sharply throughout the war."

== See also ==
- List of food riots
- List of incidents of civil unrest in New York City
