= List of incidents of civil unrest in New York City =

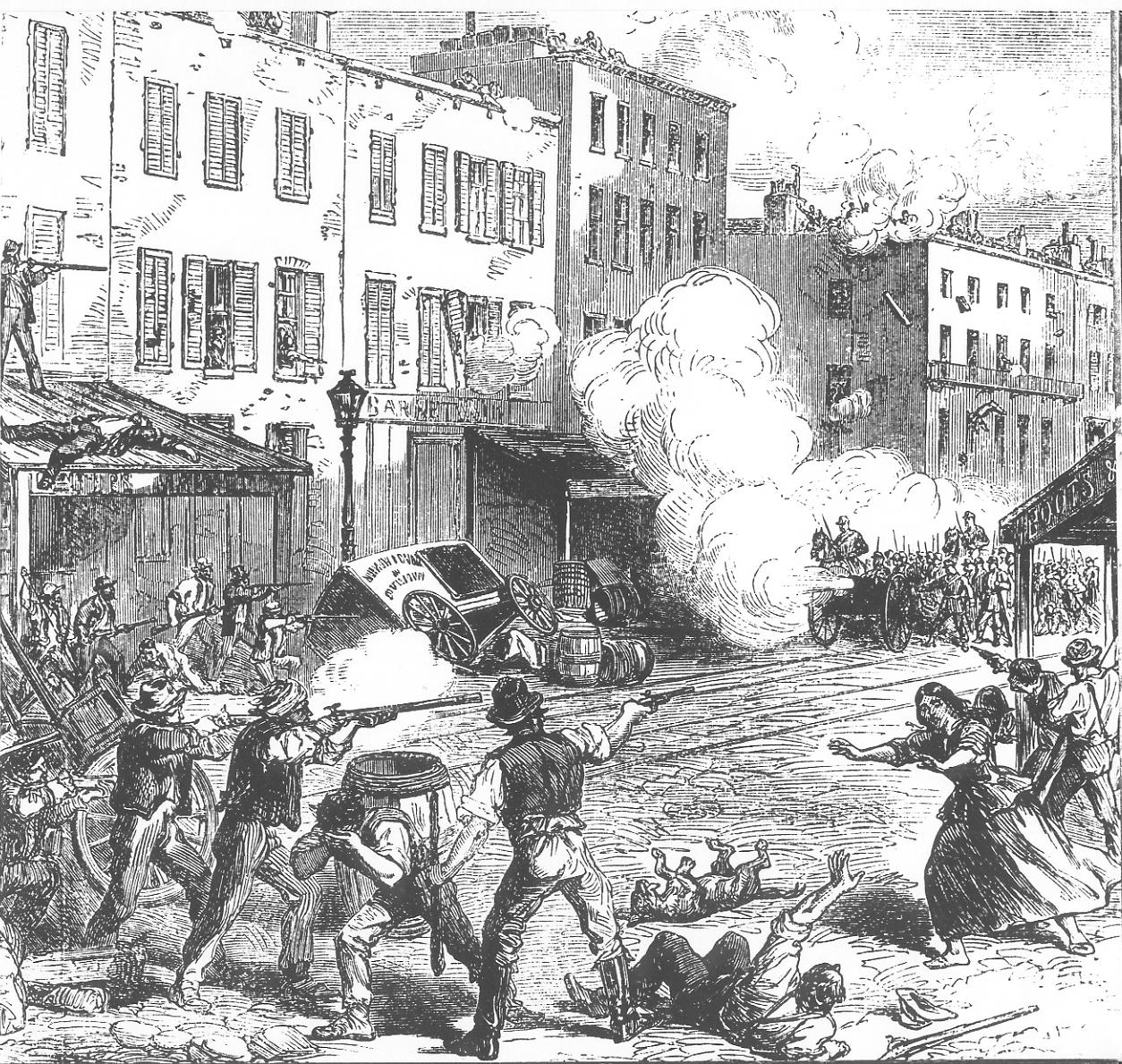
Fighting during the Draft Riots of 1863

This list is about incidents of civil unrest, rioting, violent labor disputes, or minor insurrections or revolts in New York City.

== By date ==
Civil unrest in New York by date in ascending order, from earliest to latest.

- 1712 – New York Slave Revolt occurred on April 6, when Africans set fire to a building and attacked settlers
- 1741 – New York Conspiracy occurred when a series of fires March through April burned portions of the city
- 1788 – Doctors' Riot, occurred in April over the illegal procurement of corpses from the graves of slaves and poor whites
- 1834 – Anti-abolitionist riot, occurred from July 7 to July 10 over abolitionism
- 1837 – Flour Riots, occurred February 12, when merchant stores were sacked, destroying or looting 500-600 barrels of flour and 1,000 bushels of wheat
- 1844 – Brooklyn riot, occurred on April 4 between nativists and Irish immigrants.
- 1849 – Astor Place riot, occurred May 10 at the Astor Opera House between immigrants and nativists
- 1857 – New York City Police Riot occurred June 16 between the New York Municipal Police and the Metropolitan Police over the Mayor's appointment for the position of city street commissioner
- 1857 – Dead Rabbits Riot, occurred July 4 through 5 and consisted of widespread gang violence and looting
- 1858 – Staten Island Quarantine War, Sept. 1 & 2, 1858, opposition to federal quarantine hospitals
- 1862 – 1862 Brooklyn riot occurred August 4 between the New York Metropolitan Police against a white mob attacking African American strike-breakers at a Tobacco Factory
- 1863 – New York City draft riots, occurred July 13 through 16 in response to government efforts to draft men to fight in the ongoing American Civil War.
- 1870 – First New York City Orange riot, occurred July 12 when The Twelfth demonstrators clashed with hecklers and laborers during the Orange parade
- 1871 – Second New York City Orange riot, occurred July 12 when Orangemen, police and militia clashed with the crowd during the Orange parade outside the Grand Orange Lodge of the USA headquarters
- 1874 – Tompkins Square riot, occurred January 13 when the New York City Police Department clashed with demonstrators
- 1900 - New York City Race Riot, occurred August 15 through 17th after the death of a white undercover police officer, Robert J. Thorpe caused by Arthur Harris, a black man.
- 1917 – New York City Food Riot, occurred February 20 over shortages related to World War I
- 1919 – New York race riots of 1919
- 1922 – Straw Hat Riot, occurred September 13 and 14 when gangs of boys stole hats throughout the city and assaulted those who resisted
- 1926 – Harlem Riots of July 1926. between unemployed Jews and Puerto Ricans over jobs and housing. This riot started on One Hundred and Fifteenth Street (115th), between Lenox and Park Avenues. Reserves from four Police precincts struggled for nearly half an hour before they dispersed a crowd estimated at more than 2,000 and brought temporary peace to the neighborhood.
- 1935 – Harlem riot, occurred March 19–20, sparked by rumors of the beating of a teenage shoplifter
- 1943 – Harlem riot, occurred August 1 and 2 following the nonfatal shooting of Robert Bandy by a white police officer

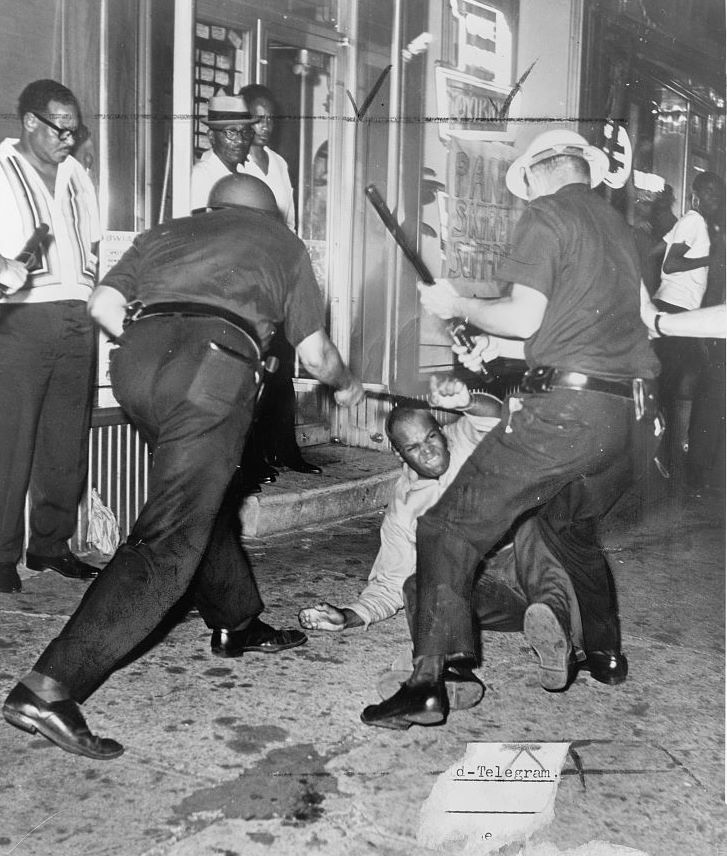
1964 riots in Harlem

- 1964 – Harlem riot, occurred July 16 through 22, following the fatal police shooting of a 15-year-old African American bystander
- 1967 - In a wave of race riots across the country called the Long, hot summer of 1967, riots and looting took place in Spanish Harlem and Bedford-Stuyvesant
- 1968 – New York City riot, occurred April 4 and 5 following the assassination of Martin Luther King
- 1968 – Columbia University protests, occurred April 23 in response to the Vietnam War and segregation
- 1969 – Stonewall riots, occurred June 28 through July 2 as a series of spontaneous, violent demonstrations by members of the gay (LGBT) community in response to a police raid of the Stonewall Inn
- 1970 – Hard Hat Riot, occurred May 8 in a confrontation between construction workers and protesters of the Vietnam War, the Kent State shootings, and the U.S. invasion of Cambodia
- 1973 – Shooting of Clifford Glover, occurred on April 28 and led to several days of rioting in the South Jamaica neighborhood
- 1977 – New York City Blackout riot, occurred July 13 and 14, when widespread looting and arson followed a power outage
- 1988 – Tompkins Square Park riot, occurred August 6 and 7 as protesters against a city imposed curfew clashed with police
- 1991 – Crown Heights riot, occurred August 19 through 21 between black and Orthodox Jewish residents after two children of Guyanese immigrants were unintentionally struck by an automobile driven by an Orthodox Jew
- 1992 – Washington Heights riots, occurred July 4 through 7 following the fatal police shooting of Jose Garcia, a 23-year-old immigrant from the Dominican Republic. One man was killed after falling five stories off a building, 15 were injured and 11 were arrested.
- 1992 – Patrolmen's Benevolent Association Riot, occurred September 16. Carried out by thousands of off-duty police officers protesting mayor David N. Dinkins' proposal to create a civilian agency to investigate police misconduct. The 300 uniformed officers did little to stop the protestors from blocking traffic on the Brooklyn Bridge, damaging vehicles, and physically assaulting journalists.
- 2011 – Occupy Wall Street (Brooklyn Bridge protests). Demonstrators blocked the bridge and more than 700 people were arrested. Brooklyn, New York
- 2013 – Flatbush Riots, on March 11, a candlelight vigil was held in response to the police shooting death of 16-year-old Kimani Gray, who allegedly pointed a .38 caliber pistol at the officers, though a later witness disputed Gray held a weapon and neither fingerprints nor DNA recovered from the weapon were a match for Gray. The demonstration turned violent due to disappointment that no public officials had attended. At least one person was injured and a Rite Aid store was looted and damaged. There was one arrest on disorderly conduct. Violence continued on March 12 resulting in two officers receiving minor injuries and 46 arrests, mostly for disorderly conduct.
- 2020 – George Floyd protests. Protests began after officers in Minnesota murdered George Floyd, an unarmed black man.
- 2023 – 2023 Union Square riot, ensued after thousands of fans of Twitch streamer Kai Cenat participated in a PlayStation 5 giveaway held at Union Square in New York City.
- 2024 – 2024 Columbia University pro-Palestinian campus occupation. The NYPD was called in by the University to clear the occupation.

== By number of deaths ==
The following is a list of civil unrest in New York by number of deaths in descending order from most to least deaths. In cases where the number of deaths is uncertain, the lowest estimate is used.

- 1863 – New York City draft riots, 120 killed and 2,000 to 8,000 injured
- 1871 – Second New York City orange riot, more than 60 dead, more than 150 wounded
- 1741 – New York Conspiracy, 35 total executed as a result
- 1712 – New York Slave Revolt, 31 total deaths consisting of 9 killed in the revolt and 23 executed as a result
- 1849 – Astor Place riot, 25 killed and more than 120 injured
- 1857 – Dead Rabbits Riot, eight dead and between 30 and 100 injured
- 1870 – First New York City orange riot, eight dead
- 1788 – Doctors Mob Riot, between six and 20 dead
- 1943 – Harlem riot, six dead
- 1935 – Harlem riot, three dead
- 1991 – Crown Heights riot, two dead and 190 injured
- 1964 – Harlem riot, one dead, 118 injured
- 1992 – Washington Heights riots, one dead and 15 injured

=== No deaths ===
The following is a list of civil unrest in New York where no deaths occurred listed in ascending order by year, from earliest to latest. The number of injured is listed in cases where the number is known.

- 1834 – Anti-abolitionist riot
- 1837 – Flour Riots
- 1844 – Brooklyn riot
- 1857 – New York City Police Riot, 53 injured
- 1862 – 1862 Brooklyn riot
- 1874 – Tompkins Square riot
- 1922 – Straw Hat Riot, unknown number injured in assaults, seven of the offending boys "spanked ignominiously" by order of the police lieutenant
- 1970 – Hard Hat Riot, more than 70 injured
- 1973 – Shooting of Clifford Glover, 24 injured
- 1977 – New York City Blackout riot
- 1988 – Tompkins Square Park riot, 38 injured
- 2020 – George Floyd protests, 353+ injured
- 2023 - 2023 Union Square riot, 9 injured

== See also ==
- Timeline of New York City
- List of incidents of civil unrest in the United States
- Lists of Incidents of unrest and violence in the United States by city
- List of riots (notable incidents of civil disorder worldwide)
