= Edward A. Stevenson Sr. =

American politician

Edward A. Stevenson Sr. (November 9, 1907 – February 1980) was an American civil servant and politician from New York.

== Life ==
He was born on November 9, 1907, in Kingston, Jamaica. In New York City, he attended high school, City College, New York University, and the Graduate School of Public Administration. He entered the New York City Department of Corrections in 1931 as assistant storekeeper, and rose to become the department's Food Service Director in 1954. He entered politics as a Democrat.

He was a member of the New York State Assembly from 1966 to 1970, sitting in the 176th, 177th and 178th New York State Legislatures. He was the first Caribbean-American to serve in the Assembly.

Edward A. Stevenson Jr. was his son and only child. Ex-Assemblyman Eric Stevenson (born 1966) is his grandson.

New York State Assembly
Preceded by new district	New York State Assembly; 86th District; 1966	Succeeded by Joseph A. Fusco
Preceded by David Dinkins	New York State Assembly; 78th District; 1967–1970	Succeeded by Louis Niñé
