= Edward A. Stevenson Jr. =

Edward A. Stevenson Jr. (January 21, 1935 – December 22, 1996) was a New York City politician active in the Bronx. A long-time city employee, he worked for the Housing Development Association and later for the Department of Environmental Protection. He had been appointed to be a commissioner of the New York City Board of Elections two days before his death.

Stevenson was a Democratic district leader in the Bronx and a co-founder of Voters Organized to Educate and Register and a founder of the Bronx Shepherd's Restoration Group and a founder of the Jackson Democratic Club. He served as chair of the Neighborhood Advisory Board and as a member of Community Board 9. In honor of his 28 years of service to the city, Boston Road between Third Avenue and East 174th Street has been designated Edward A. Stevenson Boulevard.

Stevenson and his wife Mildred had eight sons: Greg, Eric, Eddie Jr., John, Cecil, Scott, Mark, and Motier. His father, Edward A. Stevenson Sr and son Eric Stevenson were both also active in Bronx politics.
