= Marie Ganz =

Galician anarchist

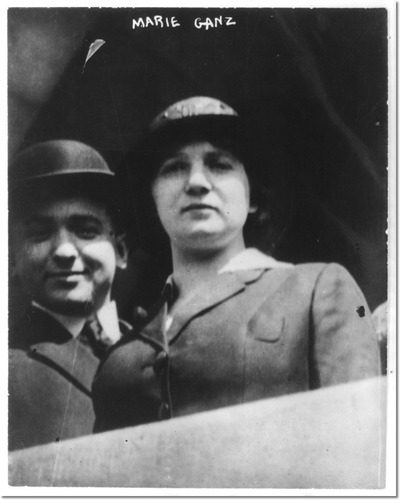
- Portrait of Ganz, 1914
- Born: 1891; Kingdom of Galicia and Lodomeria
- Died: 1968 (aged 76–77); Manhattan, New York, United States
- Movement: Anarchism
- Spouse: Nat J. Ferber
- Children: Lenore Ferber Kahn

Marie Ganz (1891–1968) was an anarchist and activist.

== Biography ==
Marie was born in Galicia, Austria, in 1891. She started work at 8 years old and left school at 13 to work full-time as a delivery person, then in a sweatshop.

In 1914, she threatened to shoot John D. Rockefeller, Jr. as she arrived with a crowd and a loaded pistol in front of the Standard Oil Building in Manhattan. She traced that desire, in part, to the Ludlow Massacre, for which, she felt, the Rockefellers were directly responsible:

"The Colorado Fuel and Iron Company, controlled by the Rockefellers, had employed armed guards to shoot down the strikers. In a battle with the State troops forty-five persons had been killed and many wounded, and women and children had been burned to death in pits as fire destroyed the tent colony at Ludlow. The whole country was ringing with these reports. The Colorado Federation of Labour was calling on the unions to arm and to aid the strikers. The Anti-Militarist League was making plans to recruit fighters to wage war against the soldiers. At the White House and in Congress labour was appealing for justice against the tyranny of capital."

The judge was lenient. Later, she authored an autobiography in which she renounced anarchism and wrote: "During all this time, Emma Goldman, the anarchist leader, was away on a lecture tour and out of harm's way. She paid no attention to appeals to come back and to take part in the meetings. She was making money and she was living comfortably at first-class hotels, and I became convinced that she had always been actuated by sordid motives."

She was arrested during the New York City Food Riot of 1917.

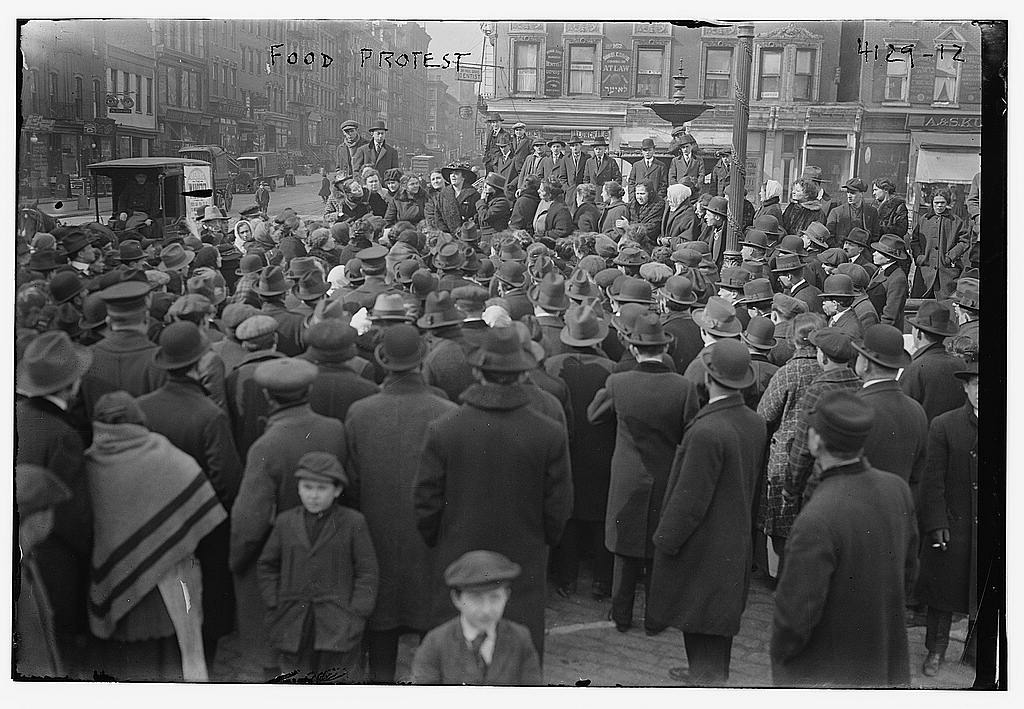
Ganz speaking at the Food Riots of 1917

In 1919, she met her future husband, journalist Nat J. Ferber, as he visited her in jail to interview her. They would go on to write her autobiography, Rebels: Into Anarchy–And Out Again. On September 30, 1921, their daughter, Lenore Ferber Kahn, was born in New York City.

Marie died at Saint Vincent's Hospital in Manhattan, New York City in 1968.
