= 1993 New York City mayoral election =

- November 2, 1993
- Registered: 3,301,683
- Turnout: 1,898,437; 57.50% (▼2.17 pp)
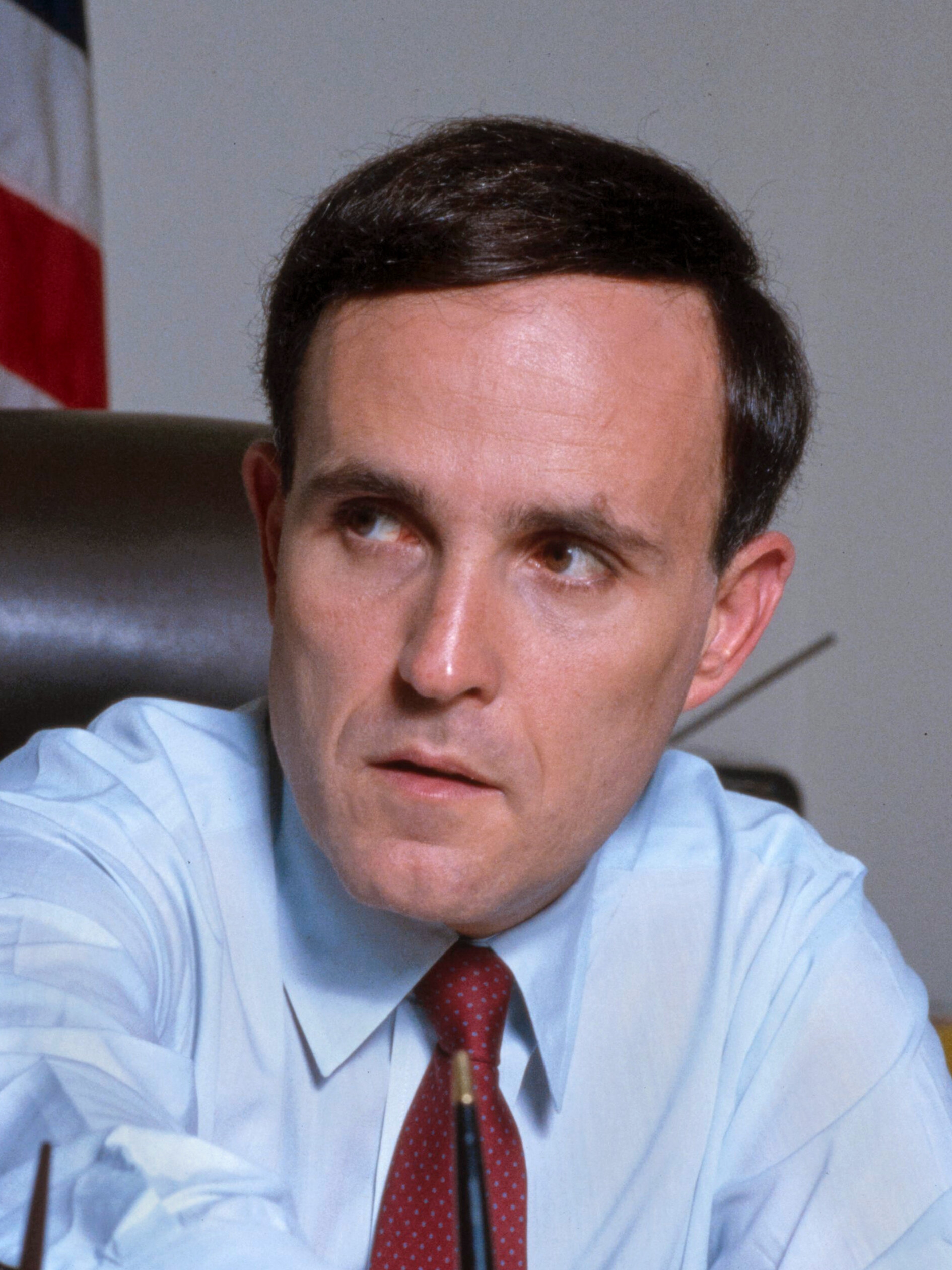

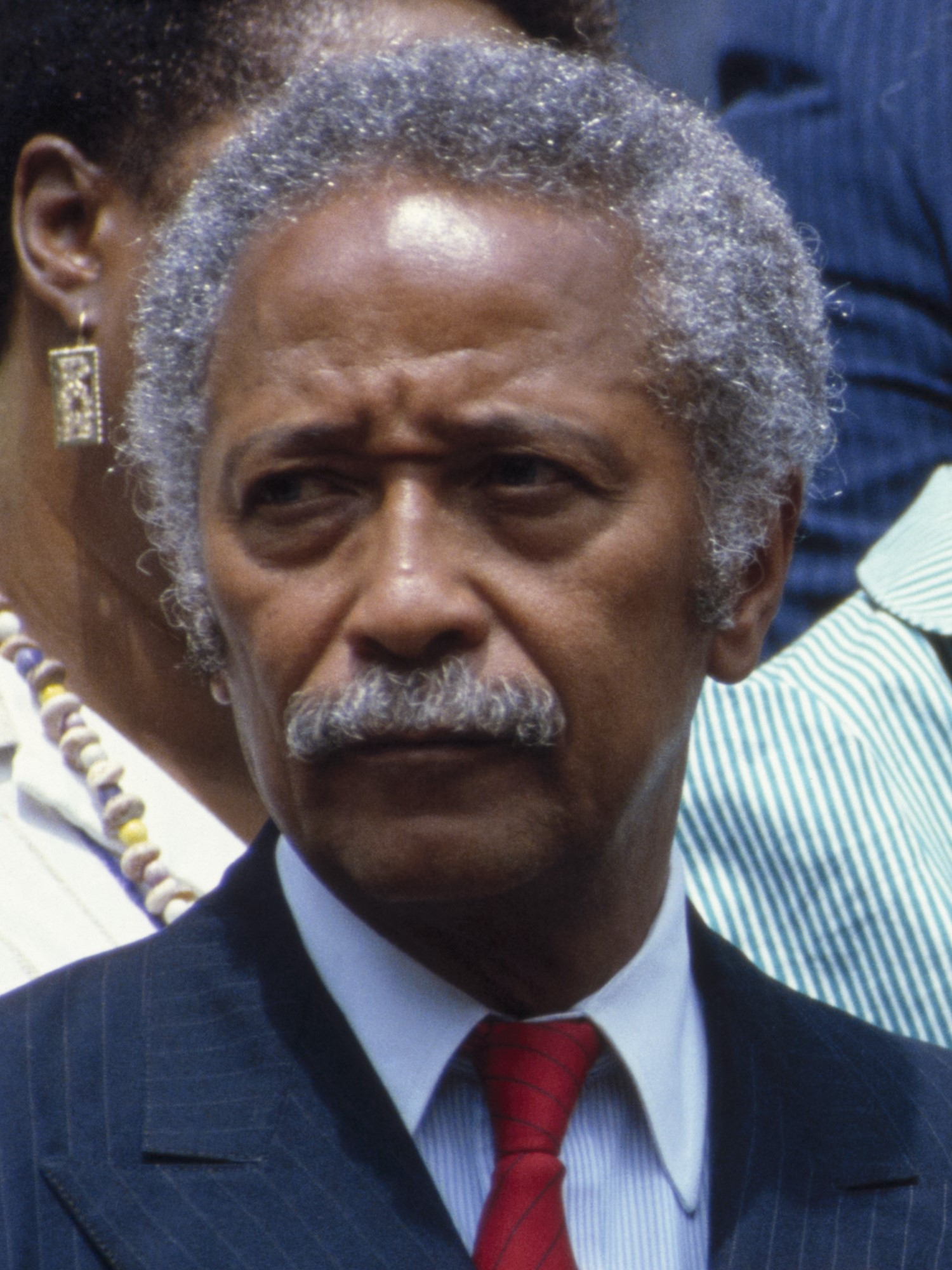
Nominee	Rudy Giuliani	David Dinkins
Party	Republican	Democratic
Alliance	Liberal
Popular vote	903,114	858,868
Percentage	50.62%	48.14%
- Giuliani: 50–60% 60–70% 70–80% 80–90% Dinkins: 50–60% 60–70% 70–80% 80–90% >90%
Mayor before election
David Dinkins
Democratic
Elected Mayor
Rudy Giuliani
Republican

The 1993 New York City mayoral election was held on Tuesday, November 2. The incumbent mayor David Dinkins of the Democratic party ran for re-election to a second term, losing in a rematch with Rudy Giuliani of the Republican party. This was the first time since 1965 that a Republican won a mayoral election in New York City. Democrats would not win a mayoral election again until 2013.

== Background ==
Dinkins had narrowly defeated Giuliani in the previous election.

By 1993, the city was suffering from a spike in unemployment associated with a nationwide recession, and with a rise in local unemployment rates from 6.7% in 1989 to 11.1% in 1992. Although crime rates had begun to fall during the Dinkins administration, Dinkins suffered badly from a perception that crime and racial tension was uncontrolled in the city, following events such as the January 1990 Family Red Apple boycott and 1991 Crown Heights riot.

In 1992, Giuliani was a key speaker at a Patrolmen's Benevolent Association rally opposing Dinkins, in which Giuliani said "The reason the morale of the police department of the City of New York is so low is one reason and one reason alone: David Dinkins!" The rally quickly devolved into a riot, with nearly 4,000 off-duty police officers storming the City Hall and blocking traffic on the Brooklyn Bridge.

== Democratic primary ==
=== Candidates ===
- David Dinkins, incumbent mayor since 1990
- Roy Innis, national director of the Congress on Racial Equality
- Eric Ruano-Melendez

==== Withdrew ====
- Herman Badillo, former U.S. Representative and Borough President of the Bronx (endorsed Rudy Giuliani, ran for Comptroller)
- Andrew J. Stein, President of the New York City Council (ran for Public Advocate)

=== Campaign ===
Herman Badillo ran a short-lived campaign for mayor, his sixth in seven elections, but dropped out on May 13 citing poor fundraising. He ran instead for New York City Comptroller on Rudy Giuliani's fusion ticket.

After Stein withdrew, the primary largely became an afterthought; Innis and Ruano-Melendez were unfamiliar to most voters, and the mayoral primary became an afterthought relative to the Comptroller and Public Advocate races, where Giuliani allies (Badillo and Susan Alter, respectively) who had already secured the Republican and Liberal endorsements ran against established Democrats in hopes of establishing a cross-party fusion ticket. The looming presence of Giuliani also led Dinkins to focus on the general election before the primary had concluded.

Innis, who had expressed conservative positions on the issues and criticized Dinkins for his handling of the Crown Heights riots, nevertheless chose to run as a Democrat, arguing, "the Democratic Party is the only game in town. It's unfortunate that we have a corrupt one-party, one ideology system in New York City, and I'd like to change that. But being a Democrat doesn't mean you have to be a fool." During his own campaign, Innis also appeared at fundraising events for the Republican candidate Rudolph Giuliani.

Dinkins did criticize Innis directly for giving Idi Amin lifetime membership in CORE and defending Amin's admiration of Adolf Hitler by stating he did not believe Hitler was unkind to "black folks". Innis responded that the attacks by Dinkins were "McCarthyism".

=== Results ===
Innis received just 25% of the vote but carried the borough of Staten Island.

Results by borough

Results by State Assembly district

Dinkins: 40–50% 50–60% 60–70% 70–80% 80–90% >90%
Innis: 40–50% 50–60% 60–70% 70–80%

1993 Democratic mayoral primary
Party	Candidate	Votes	%
Democratic	David Dinkins (incumbent)	346,181	67.61
Democratic	Roy Innis	129,872	25.36
Democratic	Eric Ruano-Melendez	35,969	7.02
Total votes		512,022	100.0

Giuliani cited the result as a sign of Dinkins's vulnerability, saying, "The Mayor was devastated today. Less than 20 percent of the electorate even turned out to vote -- it's actually considerably better than we thought. This is a Democratic Mayor who can't even get his own people out to vote."

== General election ==
=== Candidates ===
- Rudy Giuliani, former U.S. Attorney and candidate in 1989 (Republican and Liberal)
- David Dinkins, incumbent mayor (Democratic)
- George J. Marlin (Conservative)

==== Disqualified ====
- Jimmy McMillan, activist

Jimmy McMillan, the founder of the Rent Is Too Damn High Party, made his first run for political office in this election. In the course of his campaign, McMillan was at one point tied to a tree and doused with gasoline. He would later climb the Brooklyn Bridge and refuse to come down from it unless television stations broadcast his message. He was ultimately disqualified from the ballot for coming 300 petition signatures short of the 7,500 needed to qualify for the general election ballot.

=== Campaign ===
As in his unsuccessful 1989 campaign, Giuliani also ran on the Liberal Party ballot, while the Conservative Party line was held by activist George Marlin.

Citing broken windows theory, Giuliani promised to focus the police department on shutting down petty crimes and nuisances as a way of restoring the quality of life:

It's the street tax paid to drunks and panhandlers. It's the squeegee men shaking down the motorist waiting at a light. It's the trash storms, the swirling mass of garbage left by peddlers and panhandlers, and open-air drug bazaars on unclean streets.

Dinkins and Giuliani never debated during the campaign, unable to agree on how to approach a debate. Dinkins wanted to share the debate stage with third-party candidates, while Giuliani did not.

Dinkins was endorsed by The New York Times and Newsday, while Giuliani was endorsed by the New York Post and, in a key switch from 1989, the New York Daily News.

On election day, Giuliani's campaign hired off-duty cops, firefighters, and corrections officers to monitor polling places in Manhattan, Brooklyn, and The Bronx for cases of voter fraud. Despite objections from the Dinkins campaign, who claimed that the effort would intimidate Democratic voters, Police Commissioner Ray Kelly assigned an additional 52 police captains and 3,500 officers to monitor the city's polling places.

In April 2023, Giuliani admitted to using a "dirty trick" in an effort to suppress voting by the city's Hispanic population. Giuliani claimed he spent $2,000,000 on a "Voter Integrity Committee", which distributed literature in the predominantly Hispanic neighborhood of East Harlem which told voters to bring their green cards and claimed that the Immigration and Naturalization Service was conducting deportations. Giuliani says that when then-Attorney General Janet Reno questioned the tactic, he responded by saying "What civil rights did we violate? They don't have civil rights! All we did was prevent people who can't vote from voting. Maybe we tricked them, but tricking is not a crime." He also stated that "in those days, we didn't have crazy prosecutors. Nowadays, they'll probably prosecute you for it ... and that's the way we kept down the Hispanic vote."

=== Debate ===
1993 New York City mayoral election debate
No.	Date	Host	Moderator	Link	Democratic	Republican	Conservative
Key: P Participant A Absent N Not invited I Invited W Withdrawn							
Key: P Participant A Absent N Not invited I Invited W Withdrawn					David Dinkins	Rudy Giuliani	George Marlin
1	Oct. 17, 1993	WNBC	Gabe Pressman	C-SPAN	P	A	P

=== Results ===
Dinkins earned 48.3 percent of the vote, down from 51 percent in 1989. Although he was a moderate with a substantial history of building coalitions and supporting Jewish causes, one factor in Dinkins' loss was his perceived indifference to the plight of the Jewish community during the Crown Heights riot. Another was a strong turnout for Giuliani in Staten Island; a referendum on Staten Island's secession from New York City was placed on the ballot that year by Governor Mario Cuomo and the New York State Legislature. Dinkins defeated Giuliani handily in Manhattan, the Bronx, and narrowly won Brooklyn.

However, Giuliani's margin in the other two boroughs was large enough to win the election. Giuliani won by a margin of 53,367 votes. He became the first Republican elected Mayor of New York City since John Lindsay in 1965.

1993 New York City mayoral election
Party	Candidate	Votes	%	±%
Republican	Rudy Giuliani			
Liberal	Rudy Giuliani			
Total	Rudy Giuliani	903,114	50.62%	
Democratic	David Dinkins (incumbent)	858,868	48.14%	
Conservative	George Marlin			
Right to Life	George Marlin			
Total	George Marlin	16,921	0.95%	
	Bockman	2,608	0.15%	
	Brennan	2,425	0.14%	
Total votes		1,783,937	100.00%	

General Election
		Manhattan	The Bronx	Brooklyn	Queens	Staten Island	Total
change in Giuliani margin		+ 21,433	+ 8,256	+ 27,786	+ 16,428	+ 26,517	+ 100,447
Giuliani – Dinkins, 1989		– 97,600	– 72,471	– 39,071	+ 94,670	+ 67,392	– 47,080
Giuliani – Dinkins, 1993		– 76,167	– 64,215	– 11,285	+ 111,098	+ 93,909	+ 53,367
Republican - Liberal	Rudolph W. Giuliani	166,357	98,780	258,058	291,625	115,416	930,236
Democratic	David N. Dinkins	242,524	162,995	269,343	180,527	21,507	876,869
Conservative - Right to Life	George J. Marlin						15,926
							1,889,003
