= Crown Heights riot =

1991 racial riot in Brooklyn, New York City

- Crown Heights (red) in Brooklyn (yellow) and New York City (light gray)
- Date: August 19–21, 1991
- Location: Crown Heights, Brooklyn
- Caused by: Chabad motorcade collides with Guyanese children, killing one
- Methods: Rioting, looting, assault, arson, protests, property damage, murder
- Result: Controversy in New York City mayoral election of 1993; Eventual improvement of African American–Jewish relations

Casualties
- Deaths: 2
- Injuries: 152 police officers 38 civilians
- Arrested: 129

The Crown Heights riot was a race riot that took place from August 19 to August 21, 1991, in the Crown Heights section of Brooklyn, New York City. Black residents attacked Orthodox Jewish residents, damaged their homes, and looted businesses. The riots began on August 19, after two 7-year-old children of Guyanese immigrants were struck by a driver running a red light while following the motorcade of Rebbe Menachem Mendel Schneerson, the leader of Chabad, a Jewish religious movement. One child died and the second was severely injured.

In the immediate aftermath of the fatal crash, black youths attacked several Jews on the street, seriously injuring several and killing an Orthodox Jewish student from Australia. Over the next three days, black rioters looted stores and attacked Jewish homes. Two weeks after the riot, a non-Jewish man was killed by a group of black men; some believed that the victim had been mistaken for a Jew. The riots were a major issue in the 1993 mayoral race, contributing to the defeat of Mayor David Dinkins, an African American. Opponents of Dinkins said that he failed to contain the riots, with many calling them a 'pogrom' to emphasize what was seen as the complicity of New York City political leaders.

Ultimately, black and Jewish leaders developed an outreach program between their communities to help calm and possibly improve racial relations in Crown Heights over the next decade.

== Causes ==
=== Car crash ===
At approximately 8:20 p.m. on Monday, August 19, 1991, Yosef Lifsh, 22, was driving a Mercury Colony Park station wagon with three passengers west on President Street, part of the three-car motorcade of Rabbi Menachem Mendel Schneerson, leader of the Chabad Lubavitch Hasidic movement. The procession was led by an unmarked police car with two officers, with its rooftop light flashing.

The police car and Schneerson's automobile crossed Utica Avenue on a green light and proceeded along President Street at a normal speed, but Lifsh's vehicle had fallen behind. Not wishing to lose sight of Schneerson's car, Lifsh crossed Utica Avenue on a red light. There was no indication of the exact speed of his vehicle. Lifsh's vehicle struck a car being driven on Utica Avenue, veered onto the sidewalk, knocked a 600-pound (275 kg) stone building pillar down and pinned two children against an iron grate covering the window of a first-floor apartment in a four-story brick building (40.66717°N 73.93166°W). Seven-year-old Gavin Cato, the son of Guyanese immigrants, who was working on his bicycle chain while on the sidewalk near his apartment on President Street, died instantly. His seven-year-old cousin Angela Cato, who was playing nearby, survived but was severely injured.

Lifsh believed he had the right of way to proceed through the intersection because of the police escort. Lifsh said he deliberately steered his car away from adults on the sidewalk, toward the wall, a distance of about 25 yards (23 m), in order to stop the car. Lifsh later said that the car did not come to a full stop when it hit the building but slid to the left along the wall and hit the children.

=== Death of Gavin Cato ===
Accounts differ as to the next sequence of events. After the collision, Lifsh said that the first thing he did was to try to lift the car in order to free the two children beneath it. Members of the private Jewish Hatzolah Emergency medical services unit, who arrived on the scene about three minutes after the crash, at about 8:23 p.m., said that Lifsh was being beaten and pulled out of the station wagon by three or four men. Two attending police officers, as well as a technician from the City ambulance, directed the Hatzolah driver to remove Lifsh from the scene for his safety, while Gavin Cato was being removed from beneath the station wagon. Hatzolah took the driver away, and some time later a city ambulance took Gavin Cato to Kings County Hospital, arriving at 8:32 p.m.; Cato was pronounced dead shortly thereafter. Volunteers from a second Hatzolah ambulance helped Angela Cato, until a second City ambulance arrived and took her to the same hospital.

A rumor that the dying boy was ignored by the Jewish medical team spread quickly angering the Black community. According to The New York Times, more than 250 neighborhood residents, mostly black teenagers, many of whom were shouting "Jews! Jews! Jews!", jeered the driver of the car and turned their anger on the police.

Some members of the community were outraged because Lifsh was taken from the scene by a private ambulance service while city emergency workers were still trying to free the children who were pinned under the car. There was a rumor at the time that Lifsh was intoxicated. A breath alcohol test administered by police within 70 minutes of the crash indicated this was not the case.

Later that evening, as the crowds and rumors grew, people threw bottles and rocks. Someone reportedly shouted, "Let's go to Kingston Avenue and get a Jew!" A number of black youths set off westward toward Kingston Avenue (0.7 miles (1.1 km) away from Utica Avenue), a street of predominantly Jewish residents several blocks away, vandalizing cars, and throwing rocks and bottles as they went.

== Riots and murders ==
=== Murder of Yankel Rosenbaum ===
About three hours after the riots began, early on the morning of August 20, a group of approximately 20 young black men, with the incitement of Charles Price, who chanted "Let's go get a Jew," surrounded Yankel Rosenbaum, a 29-year-old Jewish University of Melbourne student in the United States conducting research for his doctorate. They stabbed him several times in the back and beat him severely, fracturing his skull. Before being taken to the hospital, Rosenbaum identified 16-year-old Lemrick Nelson Jr. as his assailant in a line-up shown to him by the police. Rosenbaum died later that night because the doctor did not notice a stab wound in his chest. Nelson was charged with murder as an adult; he was acquitted at trial.

Following that trial, Australian attorney Norman Rosenbaum became an advocate for his late brother, inspiring protests that included a shutdown of the Brooklyn Bridge and a demonstration at Gracie Mansion, the mayor's official residence.

In 1997, Nelson and Price were both convicted in federal court of violating Rosenbaum's civil rights resulting in his death. After the judge ruled that the two men had committed second degree murder, Nelson was sentenced to nearly 20 years in prison, while Price was sentenced to nearly 22 years in prison. However, that verdict was vacated on appeal due to unfairness in the jury selection process. A retrial was held in 2003. There were two primary issues of contention: whether Nelson's actions had been motivated by prejudice and whether Nelson's actions caused Rosenbaum's death.

Nelson later was convicted in federal court of violating Rosenbaum's civil rights. He eventually admitted that he had stabbed Rosenbaum but was acquitted of having caused Rosenbaum's death. Nelson received the statutory maximum of 10 years in prison. In 2002, Charles Price pleaded guilty to civil rights violations resulting in Rosenbaum's death. He was sentenced to 11 years and six months in prison.

=== Rioting ===
For three days following the crash, numerous African Americans and Caribbean Americans of the neighborhood, joined by growing numbers of non-residents, rioted in Crown Heights. In the rioting of the ensuing three days, according to Edward Shapiro, many of the rioters "did not even live in Crown Heights."

During the riots, Jewish people were injured, stores were looted, and cars and homes were damaged. The rioters identified Jewish homes by the mezuzot affixed to the front doors.

An additional 350 police officers were added to the regular duty roster on August 20 and were assigned to Crown Heights in an attempt to quell the rioting. After episodes of rock- and bottle-throwing involving hundreds of blacks and Jews, and after groups of blacks marched through Crown Heights chanting "No Justice, No Peace!", "Death to the Jews!", and "Whose streets? Our streets!", an additional 1,200 police officers were sent to confront rioters in Crown Heights.

On the third day of the disturbances, Al Sharpton and Sonny Carson led a march. The marchers proceeded through Crown Heights carrying antisemitic signs and burning an Israeli flag. Rioters threw bricks and bottles at police; shots were fired at police and police cars were pelted and overturned, including the Police Commissioner's car.

Riots escalated to the extent that a detachment of 200 police officers was overwhelmed and had to retreat for their safety. On August 22, over 1,800 police officers, including mounted and motorcycle units, had been dispatched to stop the attacks on people and property.

By the time the three days of rioting ended, 152 police officers and 38 civilians were injured, 27 vehicles were destroyed, seven stores were looted or burned, and 225 cases of robbery and burglary were committed. At least 129 arrests were made during the riots, including 122 blacks and seven whites. Property damage was estimated at one million dollars.

=== Murder of Anthony Graziosi ===
On September 5, two weeks after the riot had been controlled, Anthony Graziosi, a 67-year-old sales representative of Italian descent with a white beard who was dressed in dark business attire, was driving in the neighborhood. As he stopped at a traffic light at 11 p.m., six blocks away from where Yankel Rosenbaum had been murdered, a group of four black men surrounded his car, dragging Graziosi out and beating him before one member of the group fatally shot him. It was alleged by Graziosi's family and their attorney, as well as Senator Al D'Amato, Senator Daniel Patrick Moynihan, State Attorney General Robert Abrams, former Mayor Ed Koch, and a number of advocacy organizations, that Graziosi's resemblance to a Hasidic Jew precipitated his murder. The New York Police Department, Mayor Dinkins, newspaper columnist Mike McAlary, and the U.S. Justice Department did not agree. The murder was not treated as a hate crime.

== Viewpoints ==
After the death of Gavin Cato, members of the black community believed that the decision to remove Lifsh from the scene first was racially motivated. They also said that the decision to remove Lifsh first was proof that a perceived system in which preferential treatment was afforded to Jews existed in Crown Heights, and referred to the riot as an 'uprising'. (Some Jews referred to the riot as a 'pogrom'; see § Use of the word 'pogrom'). The preferential treatment was reported to include biased actions by law enforcement and uneven allocations of government resources, amongst others. Many members of the black community were concerned that the number of Jews in the community had increased and that they were buying all of the property in the crowded area.

The text of an interview which was conducted by Shmuel Butman, published in 1991, cites a police directive to Hatzolah to transport Lifsh, along with Jews who were already injured by rioters, without transporting either of the Cato children. "We did exactly what the police officers wisely advised us." Based on protesters' statements and actions during the rioting, Butman said, "We were always hoping that after World War II no Jew would ever be killed just for being Jewish, but this is what happened in the city of New York." In his eulogy at the funeral of Gavin Cato, the Rev. Al Sharpton said that "It's an accident to allow an apartheid ambulance service in the middle of Crown Heights" and referred to "diamond merchants right here in Crown Heights."

A writer for City Journal criticized the news media for downplaying the role which antisemitism played in the riots, noting various antisemitic displays, such as a banner which was displayed at the funeral of Cato that said, "Hitler did not do the job". Edward S. Shapiro, a historian at Seton Hall University, later described the riot as "the most serious anti-Semitic incident in American history" and published a book about it in 2006. He notes that there are many interpretations of what happened:

Almost immediately after the riot a host of differing interpretations emerged regarding its nature and origins. This effort at explanation ... reflected the diverse political, religious, and social circumstances, the differing ideological assumptions, and the divergent understandings of the past by the journalists, sociologists, political activists, and historians who wrote about the riot.

— Edward S. Shapiro, American Jewish History, 2002

== Court case ==
A grand jury composed of 10 black, eight white, and five Hispanic jurors found no cause to indict Lifsh. Brooklyn District Attorney Charles J. Hynes explained that under New York law, the single act of "losing control of a car" is not criminal negligence, even if death or injury resulted. Lifsh waived immunity and testified before the grand jury. About an hour after hearing Lifsh's testimony, the grand jury voted not to indict him. Subsequently, Lifsh moved to Israel, where his family lives, because he claimed his life was threatened. In Israel, Lifsh settled in the Lubavitch village of Kfar Chabad.

Afterwards, Hynes fought unsuccessfully for the public release of the testimony that the grand jury had heard. His lawsuit was dismissed, and the judge noted that more than three-quarters of the witnesses who had been contacted refused to waive their right to privacy. The judge also expressed concern for the witnesses' safety.

== Aftermath ==
=== Impact on the 1993 mayoral race ===
The Crown Heights riot contributed to the defeat of David Dinkins in his second mayoral bid. He was attacked by many political adversaries in his reelection bid, including vocal proponents of "Black nationalism, back-to-Africa, economic radicalism, and racial exclusiveness."

==== Girgenti Report ====
On November 17, 1992, New York Governor Mario Cuomo gave the Director of Criminal Justice Services, Richard H. Girgenti, the authority to investigate the rioting and the Nelson trial. The Girgenti Report was compiled by over 40 lawyers and investigators. The 656-page document, dated July 1993, is available through a website of the Washington, DC–based Police Foundation, which prefaces the report with a disclaimer that the "review does not seek to put blame on any entity for what happened..."

The report was extremely critical of Police Commissioner Lee Brown. The report also criticized Mayor Dinkins for poor handling of the riots. However, the report found no evidence to support the most severe charge against Dinkins and Brown: that they had purposely delayed the police response in order to allow rioters to "vent" their rage.

The first night of the riot, Dinkins, along with Police Commissioner Brown, both African Americans, went to Crown Heights to talk to the community to dispel the rumors about the circumstances surrounding the crash. They had no appreciable influence on the rioters, most of whom were young black men.

In a 16-minute speech on the Thanksgiving holiday following the riot, Dinkins rebutted allegations that he had prevented police from protecting citizens in Crown Heights. The Jewish community believed Dinkins failed to contain the riot and failed to exercise his responsibility, to their detriment.

==== Use of the word 'pogrom' ====
The Crown Heights riot was an important event that was repeatedly talked about on the campaign trail during the 1993 mayoral election. According to Edward S. Shapiro, politicians who opposed Mayor Dinkins used the word 'pogrom' in an attempt to discredit his response to the riot by characterizing it as an act of government-approved violence against Jews, writing "the controversy over how to define the Crown Heights riot was not merely an issue of semantics."

Rudy Giuliani, who would be elected as the next mayor of New York, referred to the Crown Heights riot as a 'pogrom' on July 1, 1993, during a speech which he made in Bay Ridge, Brooklyn, he stated: "You can use whatever word you want, but in fact for three days people were beaten up, people were sent to the hospital because they were Jewish. There's no question that not enough was done about it by the city of New York. One definition of pogrom is violence where the state doesn't do enough to prevent it." Other political opponents of Dinkins also used the term, including Ed Koch, who had been defeated by Dinkins in the 1989 Democratic mayoralty primary, and Andrew Stein, a candidate in the 1993 Democratic mayoral primary. The term had previously been used in 1991 by journalists such as A. M. Rosenthal in The New York Times and Eric Breindel in the New York Post, and politicians such as New York City Councilman Noach Dear and later by Judah Gribetz, president of the JCRC of New York. By September 1991, it had become routine within Jewish circles to describe the riot as a pogrom. Some Jews continued to use this term for the riot a decade later, as shown by articles in publications such as Jewish Week, The Jerusalem Post, The Forward and The Jewish Press; others went further and called it "America's Kristallnacht".

The use of the word 'pogrom' was rejected by Dinkins and his supporters, primarily on the basis that by definition, a pogrom is a state-sponsored act of violence. Dinkins said, "To suggest that this is [a pogrom] is not to contribute to the resolution of the problem but to exacerbate tensions and problems that are there." Dinkins was personally offended by the use of the word "pogrom" since it insinuated that the riot was state-sanctioned and it also insinuated that he personally was an antisemite. "I am incensed by it... [it is] patently untrue and unfair."

In 1992, Michael Stanislawski, Professor of Jewish History at Columbia University, wrote that it was "historically inaccurate" to couple "pogrom" with the riot which occurred in Crown Heights, because the word "pogrom" denoted the perpetration of acts of state-sponsored violence against Jews, acts of violence which are "having some sort of governmental involvement." Journalists also disagreed with the use of the term, including Joyce Purnick in The New York Times, Earl Caldwell in the New York Daily News, and an article in The City Sun. Rev. Al Sharpton said that Giuliani was engaged in "race-baiting" by using the word "pogrom." Henry Siegman and Marc D. Stern of the American Jewish Congress also publicly rejected use of the term to refer to the riot.

In 2011, shortly before the twentieth anniversary of the riots, an editorial in The Jewish Week stated: "A divisive debate over the meaning of pogrom, lasting for more than two years, could have easily been ended if the mayor simply said to the victims of Crown Heights, yes, I understand why you experienced it as a pogrom."

=== Ethnic relations ===
Prior to the riots, Eastern Parkway divided the black community in northern Crown Heights and the Jewish community in southern Crown Heights. Efforts which were aimed at improving the relations between black people and Jews in Crown Heights began almost immediately after the rioting. Brooklyn Borough President Howard Golden summoned the leaders of each of the ethnic communities to Borough Hall within days after the riots ended, creating what became known as the Crown Heights Coalition. The Coalition, led by Edison O. Jackson, then President of Medgar Evers College, and Rabbi Shea Hecht, chairman of the Board of the National Committee for the Furtherance of Jewish Education (NCFJE), operated for ten years as an inter-group forum in which residents of the neighborhood could air their concerns and attempt to resolve their issues. Golden used the Coalition to initiate interracial projects which were designed to promote dialogue. One project involved sending a Jewish leader and a black leader together in a pair to public intermediate and high schools in the area to answer questions from the children about each other's cultures.

A week after the riot, Hatzolah helped repair an ambulance which was used by providers of a black-owned volunteer service. The following year, the Brooklyn Children's Museum held an exhibit about the contributions which were made by black people and Jews in New York. In 1993, the Rev. Jesse Jackson actively promoted improved black-Jewish relations. In 1993, a series of neighborhood basketball games were scheduled by teams which represented the two communities, including a scrimmage which was scheduled to be held as part of the halftime entertainment during a New York Knicks vs. Philadelphia 76ers professional basketball game. Also that year, Rabbi Israel Shemtov, whose anti-crime patrol had long been perceived by many black residents as biased against them, rushed to the aid of a black woman who had been shot on the street in Crown Heights, putting her in his car and taking her to the hospital. The Crown Heights Mediation Center was established in 1998 to help resolve local differences, also a direct outcome of the Coalition.

=== Anniversary commemorations ===
On August 19, 2001, a street fair was held in memory of Cato and Rosenbaum, and their relatives met and exchanged mementos in hopes of healing in Crown Heights. Again in 2016, family members Carmel Cato and Norman Rosenbaum planned to meet together to commemorate their loss.

Twenty years after the riot, a Manhattan synagogue invited Sharpton to participate in a panel discussion marking the anniversary. Norman Rosenbaum, brother of the murdered Yankel Rosenbaum, was outraged, saying inviting Sharpton to speak was "an absolute disgrace" and that his "vile rhetoric incited the rioting." He added that Sharpton "did absolutely nothing then to improve black-Jewish relations — and nothing since." Sharpton expressed regret for some aspects of his involvement. He insisted that his marches were peaceful, although his language and tone "sometimes exacerbated tensions."

In a 2019 speech to a Reform Jewish gathering, Sharpton said that he could have "done more to heal rather than harm". He recalled receiving a call from Coretta Scott King at the time, during which she told him "sometimes you are tempted to speak to the applause of the crowd rather than the heights of the cause, and you will say cheap things to get cheap applause rather than do high things to raise the nation higher".

=== Demographics ===
In his 2006 book about the riot, Edward Shapiro wrote that the demographic trends in Crown Heights largely remained the same as they were back in 1991. Jews did not flee from Crown Heights, and the Lubavitch population of Crown Heights increased after the riot, leading to an expansion of the area in which they reside.

== In popular culture ==
Anna Deavere Smith interviewed more than 100 people who were directly and indirectly involved in the riot and afterward, she wrote her play Fires in the Mirror (1992), a one-woman show with Smith playing the roles of numerous public and private figures, having drawn quotes from the transcripts of her interviews.

The television film Crown Heights (2004), starring Howie Mandel, focused on the aftermath of the riot.

== See also ==
- Antisemitism in the United States
  - History of antisemitism in the United States
    - Lynching of American Jews
    - List of antisemitic incidents in the United States
- History of the Jews in the United States
  - History of the Jews in New York City
- Interminority racism in the United States
  - African American–Jewish relations
    - New York City teachers' strike of 1968 – an eruption of tensions between African Americans and Jews in New York City
- List of incidents of civil unrest in the United States
  - List of incidents of civil unrest in New York City
- Mass racial violence in the United States
- Racism in Jewish communities
