= Hard Hat Riot =

1970 riot in New York, New York, United States

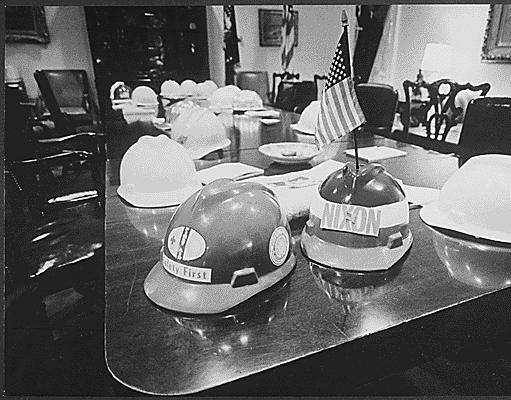
- Hard hats on Cabinet table after Nixon meeting with and supporting construction trades group 18 days after the New York City Hard Hat Riot
- Location: New York City Hall, New York, New York, US
- Date: May 8, 1970; 56 years ago 11:55 a.m. (Eastern Time Zone)
- Deaths: 0
- Injuries: 100+
- Perpetrators: NYC union trade/construction workers, office workers

The Hard Hat Riot occurred in New York City on May 8, 1970, when around 400 construction workers and around 800 office workers attacked around 1,000 demonstrators affiliated with the student strike of 1970. The students were protesting the May 4 Kent State shootings and the Vietnam War, following the April 30 announcement by President Richard Nixon of the US invasion of neutral Cambodia. Some construction workers carried US flags and chanted "USA all the way" and "America, love it or leave it". Anti-war protesters shouted "Peace now".

The riot, first breaking out near the intersection of Wall Street and Broad Street in Lower Manhattan, led to a mob scene with more than 20,000 people in the streets, eventually leading to a siege of New York City Hall, an attack on Pace University and lasted more than three hours. Around 100 people, including seven policemen, were injured on what became known as Bloody Friday. Six people were arrested, but only one of them was a construction worker associated with the rioters. Nixon invited the hardhat leaders to Washington, D.C., and accepted a hardhat from them.

== Background ==
On May 4, 1970, thirteen students were shot, four of them fatally, at Kent State University in Ohio by National Guardsmen as they demonstrated against the US involvement in the Vietnam War and US incursions into neutral Cambodia. One of the dead was Jeffrey Glenn Miller, who was from a New York City suburb on Long Island, which led to funeral proceedings in Manhattan and Long Island and in turn helped fuel local activism. In the days before the riot, there were anti-war protests on Wall Street and smaller clashes between construction workers and anti-war demonstrators. As a show of sympathy for the dead students, New York Mayor John Lindsay, a Republican, ordered all flags at New York City Hall to be flown at half-staff on May 8, the day of the riot.

The US labor movement was deeply divided over support for President Richard Nixon's war policy. AFL–CIO president George Meany and most US labor leaders were vehemently anti-communist and thus strongly supported military involvement in Southeast Asia. Peter J. Brennan, president of the Building and Construction Trades Council of Greater New York, was a strong supporter of Nixon's policy of Vietnamization and ending US involvement in the war. He was also president of the Building and Construction Trades Council of New York, the statewide umbrella group for construction unions, and the vice president of the New York City Central Labor Council and the New York State AFL–CIO, umbrella groups for all labor unions in these respective areas. Brennan was a registered Democrat who had lobbied strongly for that party through the 1950s and 1960s, but increasingly supported Republican candidates as support for skilled labor unions decreased.

New York City's building and construction unions were overwhelmingly white, Catholic, blue-collar and male. Although blue-collar whites were not generally more pro-war than upscale whites, the anti-war movement was particularly unpopular among blue collar whites. According to David Paul Kuhn, in response to flag desecration within the anti-war movement and perceived rejection of returning veterans, a disproportionate majority of whom were blue-collar, blue-collar whites came to oppose the anti-war demonstrators, who tended to be college-educated, a group which were disproportionately non-veterans.

== The riot ==
At 7:30 a.m. on May 8, several-hundred anti-war protesters, mostly college students, began picketing the New York Stock Exchange, and later held a protest and memorial at Federal Hall for the four dead students at Kent State. By late morning, after some high school students, teachers and others joined, more than a thousand protesters were gathered in the street in front of Federal Hall and on the steps around George Washington's statue. Future New York City Council member Paul O'Dwyer was among the speakers. The protesters demanded an end to the war, the release of political prisoners in the United States such as Black Panther Party leaders Huey Newton and Bobby Seale and an end to military-related research on all university campuses.

Shortly before noon, more than 400 construction workers, many of whom were building the World Trade Center, converged on the student protest from four directions. Some construction workers carried US flags and chanted, "USA all the way" and "America, love it or leave it". Anti-war protesters shouted "Peace now". More than 800 office workers soon joined the construction workers' ranks. Hundreds more construction workers arrived around noon, as the lunchtime crowd and onlookers in the streets exceeded 20,000. A thin and inadequate line of NYPD police officers, who were largely sympathetic to the workers' position, formed to separate them from the protesters. Construction workers then broke through the police lines and began chasing students through the streets. Workers attacked those who looked like hippies and beat them with their hard hats and other weapons, including tools and steel-toe boots. Victims and onlookers reported that the police stood by and did little.

Hundreds of construction workers and counter-protesters moved up Broadway, making their way to City Hall. They pushed their way to the top of the front steps as some chanted "Hey, hey, whattya say? We support the USA", while others held American flags. The workers attempted to gain entrance, demanding the flag above City Hall be raised to whole staff. Police on duty at City Hall, and reinforcements, were able to stop them from getting inside. A few workers were asked to enter the building to calm tensions. One postal worker, who was already inside, went to the roof and raised the US flag there to full mast. When one mayoral aide lowered the flag back down to half-mast, hundreds of construction workers stormed the area around City Hall, leading to a melee similar to the one on Wall Street the hour prior. Deputy Mayor Richard Aurelio, fearing the building would be overrun by the mob, ordered city workers to raise the flag back to full mast.

Rioting construction workers, many of them Catholic "white ethnics", also attacked buildings near City Hall. Several workmen ripped the Red Cross flag down at nearby Trinity Church, because the flag was associated with the anti-war protestors, though it was planted to signal a first aid haven. Several groups of construction workers stormed the newly-built main building at Pace University, smashing lobby windows and beating up students and professors, including with tools. Ironically, Pace was a conservative, business-oriented school where the most popular major was accounting—hardly a hotbed of activism. More than 100 people were injured, including seven policemen. Most of the injured required hospital treatment. The most common victim was a "22-year-old white male collegian" and the worst injuries were to the "half-dozen young men beaten unconscious," but about one in four of the injured were women. Six people were arrested, but only one construction worker was arrested by police.

== Aftermath ==
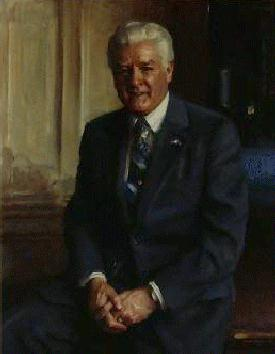
Peter J. Brennan, US Secretary of Labor during the Nixon and Ford administrations.

During a press conference that evening, President Nixon tried to defuse the situation before tens of thousands of students arrived in Washington, D.C. for a scheduled protest rally the next day. Before dawn, the next morning, Nixon told some protesters that, "I understand just how you feel" and defended the recent troop movements into Cambodia as aiding their goal of peace.

Mayor Lindsay severely criticized the NYPD for their lack of action. NYPD leaders later accused Lindsay of "undermining the confidence of the public in its police department" by his statements, and blamed their inaction on inadequate preparations and "inconsistent directives" in the past from the mayor's office.

The following week, Brennan claimed that "the unions had nothing to do with" the riot and that workers were allegedly "fed up" with violence and flag desecration by anti-war demonstrators. He also denied that anything except fists had been used against the demonstrators, though police records showed tools and some iron pipes were used. One man, Edward Shufro, of the brokerage firm Rose and Ehrman, saw two men wearing grey suits directing the workers. The NYPD "buried most records of police malfeasance", according to Kuhn's The Hardhat Riot. In August 1970 the NYPD published a report that largely acquitted itself of any collusion with the construction workers, though its own records were shown, decades later, to undermine that report. The construction workers and police were both mostly "white ethnics", lived in the same neighborhoods, and socialized in similar establishments. Many were also veterans of World War II and Korea, and both were also disproportionately likely to have family and friends in Vietnam.

National Security Advisor Henry Kissinger later wrote, "The incident shocked some into the realization that a breakdown of civil order could backfire dangerously against the demonstrators." On Sunday, May 10, White House Chief of Staff H. R. Haldeman wrote in his diary, "The college demonstrators have overplayed their hands, evidence is the blue-collar group rising up against them, and [the] president can mobilize them".

Several thousand construction workers, longshoremen and white-collar workers protested against Lindsay on May 11, holding signs reading, "Impeach the Red Mayor" and chanting "Lindsay is a bum". They held another rally May 16, carrying signs calling Lindsay a "rat", "commie rat" and "traitor". Mayor Lindsay described the mood of the city as "taut". These demonstrations culminated in a large rally on May 20, in which an estimated 150,000 construction workers, longshoremen and others gathered outside City Hall. When the workers later marched down Broadway, many office workers in surrounding buildings showed their support by showering the marchers with ticker tape. One magazine coined the day "Workers' Woodstock".

Union stewards and contractors encouraged their construction employees to attend these rallies, and those who refused to attend were informed that their pay would be withheld for the day. At the May 20 rally, black construction workers freely told newspaper reporters that they were being made to attend under duress.

On May 26, Brennan led a delegation of 22 union leaders, representing more than 300,000 tradesmen, to meet with Nixon at the White House and presented him with several ceremonial hardhats and a flag pin. Nixon said he sought to honor those “labor leaders and people from Middle America who still have character and guts and a bit of patriotism.” Nixon's general counsel, Charles Colson, who organized the meeting and was later in charge of developing a strategy to win union support for Nixon in the 1972 presidential election, identified Brennan as a friendly labor leader due to his role in organizing the counter-protests in the weeks after the riot.

In its August 1970 issue, Scanlan's Monthly claimed that Spiro Agnew had arranged the riots and demonstrations using CIA funding. This infuriated Nixon, who urged the FBI and IRS to investigate the small magazine. The following month's issue investigated the criminal records of the leading hard hat rioters.

Brennan later organized significant union political support for Nixon in the 1972 election. Nixon appointed him labor secretary as reward for his support, a position he retained under President Gerald Ford into 1975, following Nixon's resignation.

The 2020 book The Hardhat Riot described the event as the day when the Old Left attacked the New Left: "two liberalisms collided that day, presaging the long Democratic civil war ahead". It claimed that the riot and the demonstrations that followed captured the "era when FDR’s everyman first turned against the liberalism that once had championed him" and Nixon "moved the Republican Party from blue bloods to blue collars". In its review of the book, the New York Daily News wrote that the riot "changed American politics, perhaps forever", while The New York Times’ Clyde Haberman characterized it as "a blue-collar rampage whose effects still ripple, not the least of them being Donald Trump’s improbable ascension to the presidency".

== See also ==
- List of incidents of civil unrest in New York City
- List of incidents of civil unrest in the United States
- New Left
- Mineriad
