= Carla Peterson (academic) =

American academic (born 1944)

Carla L. Peterson (born September 4, 1944) is a Professor of English at the University of Maryland, College Park. Her expertise includes nineteenth-century African-American women writers and speakers in the northern US, African-American novelists in the post-Reconstruction era, and gender and culture in historical literature.

== Career ==
=== Education ===
Peterson completed her Ph.D. at Yale University in 1976. Subsequently, she won a National Research Council Postdoctoral Fellowship for Minorities from 1981–1982 and a fellowship at the Center for Advanced Study in the Behavioral Sciences (at Stanford) from 1987-1988. In the 1990s, she won awards from the American Council of Learned Societies (1991–1992) and from the American Association of University Women (1991–1992).

=== Research and teaching activities ===
In the American Studies Association, Peterson served as co-chair of the ASA 2003 Annual Meeting Program Committee, and was a member of the John Hope Franklin Prize Committee in 1993-94. She also sat on the American Quarterly Board of Managing Editors and was on the Board of Advisory Editors. Peterson has participated in the TV documentaries, “Ticket to Freedom” and “Remembering Slavery.” Peterson has held curriculum development workshops for public school teachers and served as a USIA academic specialist in American Studies at institutions such as Quisqueya University, Port-au-Prince, Haiti. She has also taught summer seminars in Rio de Janeiro and Mexico City.

=== Current activities ===
Peterson is currently a member of the Maryland Humanities Council Speakers Bureau. Peterson also serves as an affiliate faculty member of the American Studies, African-American Studies, and Women’s Studies Departments. Her current research interests include a range of issues including race, ethnicity, African-American issues, gender and feminism, family/children/child development, history, and literature.

Peterson's most recent book, Black Gotham: African American Family and Community in Nineteenth-Century New York, was published in 2012. The book is a non-fiction account of nineteenth-century black New Yorkers, viewed from the perspective of family histories.

== Works ==
- The Determined Reader: Gender and Culture in the Novel from Napoleon to Victoria (1986)
- “Doers of the Word”: African-American Women Speakers and Writers in the North (1830-1880). New York: Oxford University Press, 1995.
- “Reconstructing the Nation: Frances Harper, Charlotte Forten, and the Racial Politics of Periodical Publication.” Proceedings of the American Antiquarian Society, vol. 107, no. 2, Oct. 1997, pp. 301–34. EBSCOhost, https://search.ebscohost.com/login.aspx?direct=true&db=31h&AN=44539495&site=ehost-live&scope=site.
- "The Remaking of Americans: Gertrude Stein's 'Melanctha' and African-American Musical Traditions" in Criticism and the Color Line: Desegregating American Literary Studies, Rutgers UP, 1996.
- * “Reading Contested Spaces in Antebellum New York: Black Community, City Neighbourhoods and the Draft Riots of 1863.” In “We Shall Independent Be”: African American Place-Making and the Struggle to Claim Space in the United States, edited by Leslie M. Alexander and Angel David Nieves. Boulder: University Press of Colorado, 2008.
- Black Gotham: Family History of African Americans in Nineteenth-Century New York City, Yale University Press, 2011.
- Coles, K.A., Bauer, R., Peterson, C.L., Nunes, Z. "Introduction." In The Cultural Politics of Blood, 1500-1900, edited by Coles, K.A., Bauer, R., Nunes, Z., Peterson, C.L. London: Palgrave Macmillan, 2014. https://doi.org/10.1057/9781137338211_1.
- "Mapping Taste: Urban Modernities from the Tatler and Spectator to Frederick Douglass’ Paper", American Literary History, Vol. 32 Issue 4, pp. 691–722, 2020.
