= List of riots =

This is a chronological list of known riots.

== 17th century and earlier ==
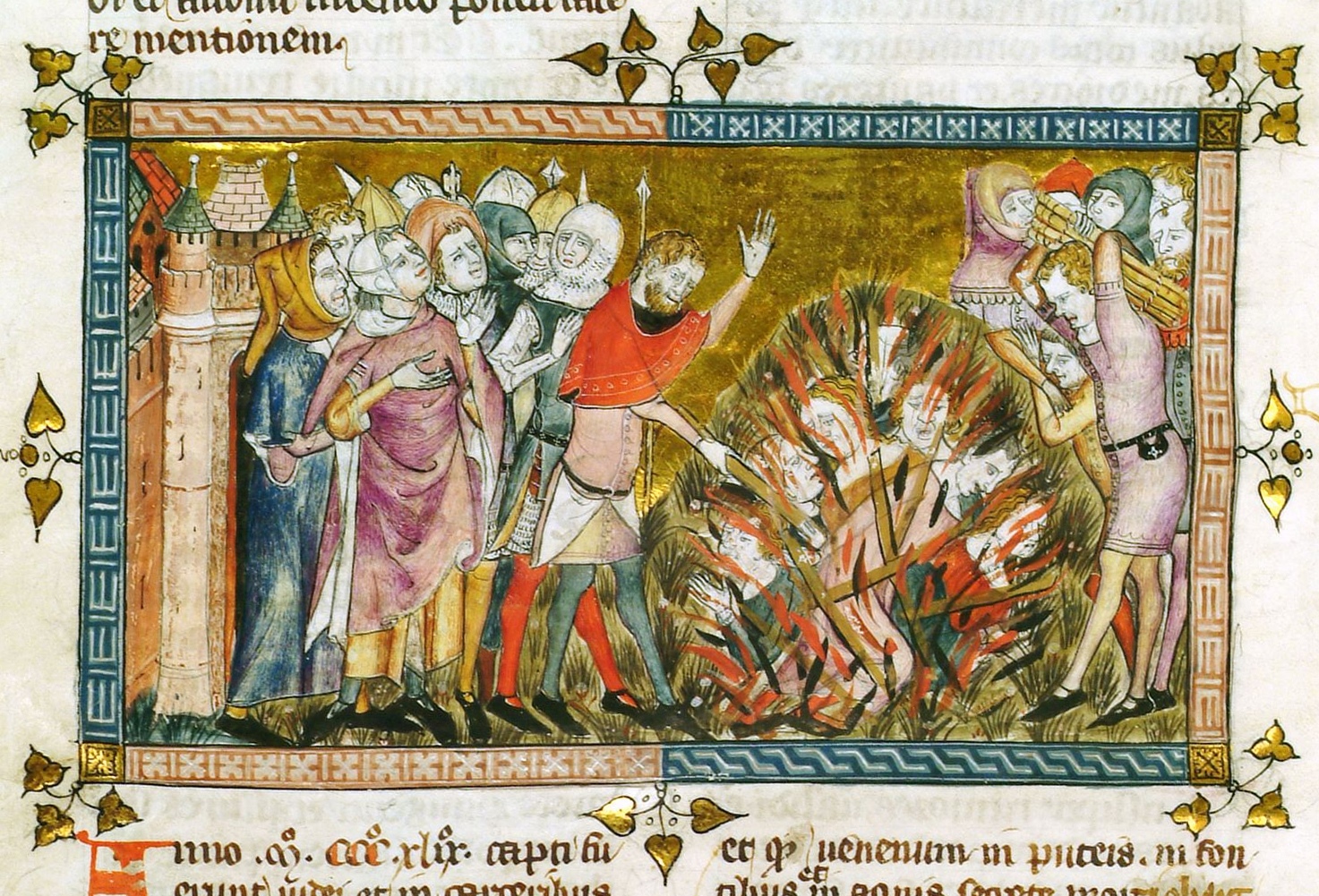
Representation of a massacre of the Jews in the 1349 Anti-Jew riots, that was justified by allegations that Jews were behind the Black Death Epidemic. Antiquitates Flandriae (Royal Library of Belgium manuscript 1376/77).

- 205–186 – BC The great revolt of Egypt against Ptolemy V Epiphanes.
- 48 BC – 47 BC – Riots during the Siege of Alexandria (47 BC) in Egypt.
- 44 BC – Assassination of Julius Caesar (Rome, Roman Republic). During Caesar's cremation in the Forum, an incensed mob took firebrands from the pyre and attacked the houses of Brutus and Cassius, as well as killing Helvius Cinna.
- 6 CE – Riots in Rome precipitated by a grain shortage caused by a failed harvest.
- 38, 40 – Alexandrian riots (38 CE) erupted in Alexandria (Roman Egypt) between Jews and Greeks.
- 66 – Jerusalem riots. Massacres of Roman and Greek inhabitants by a Jewish mob
- 115 – Diaspora Revolt. Jewish mobs massacre Greek civilians in Cyprus and Alexandria. Escalates into full-blown rebellion (115-117) in which 220,000 Greeks are massacred
- 532 – Nika riots (Constantinople, Byzantine Empire). Thirty thousand killed in the Hippodrome.
- 1046 – Vata pagan uprising (Pest, Hungary)
- 1066 – 1066 Granada massacre (Granada, Andalusia). A Muslim mob killed the Jewish vizier and massacred the Jewish population.
- 1182 – (Constantinople, Byzantine Empire). Venetians and other "Latins" massacred during a riot.
- 1196 – Poor riot (England)
- 1229 – 1229 University of Paris strike (France). Student riot leads to closing of university for two years.
- 1298 – Rintfleisch massacres (Holy Roman Empire)
- 1349 – Strasbourg massacre, over 2000 Jews killed after widespread rioting caused by claims that they were behind the spread of the Black Death Epidemic. Most of the victims were burned to death.
- 1355 – St Scholastica Day riot (Oxford, England)
- 1381 – Peasants' Revolt (England)
- 1382 – Harelle (France)
- 1391 – The Massacre of 1391 (Spain)
- 1437–1438 – Transylvanian peasant revolt (Hungary)
- 1506 – Lisbon massacre of Jews.
- 1517 – Evil May Day (London, England)
- 1562 – 1562 Riots of Toulouse (Toulouse, France)
- 1572 – St. Bartholomew's Day massacre (Paris, France)
- 1588 – Day of the Barricades (Paris, France)
- 1640 – Corpus de Sang (Barcelona, Spain)
- 1648 – Salt Riot (Moscow, Russia)
- 1662 – Copper Riot (Moscow, Russia)
- 1668 – Bawdy House Riots (London, England)
- 1692 – Mexico City

== 18th century ==
- 1706–1707 – Treaty of Union Riots (various cities, Scotland)
- 1710 – Sacheverell riots (England)
- 1710–1713 – Boston Bread Riot (Boston, British America)
- 1713 – Dublin election riot (Dublin, Kingdom of Ireland)
- 1714 – Coronation riots, England
- 1715 – 1715 England riots
- 1726 – Riot in Dresden for two days after a Protestant clergyman was killed by a soldier who had recently converted from Catholicism.
- 1736 – Porteous Riots (Edinburgh, Scotland)

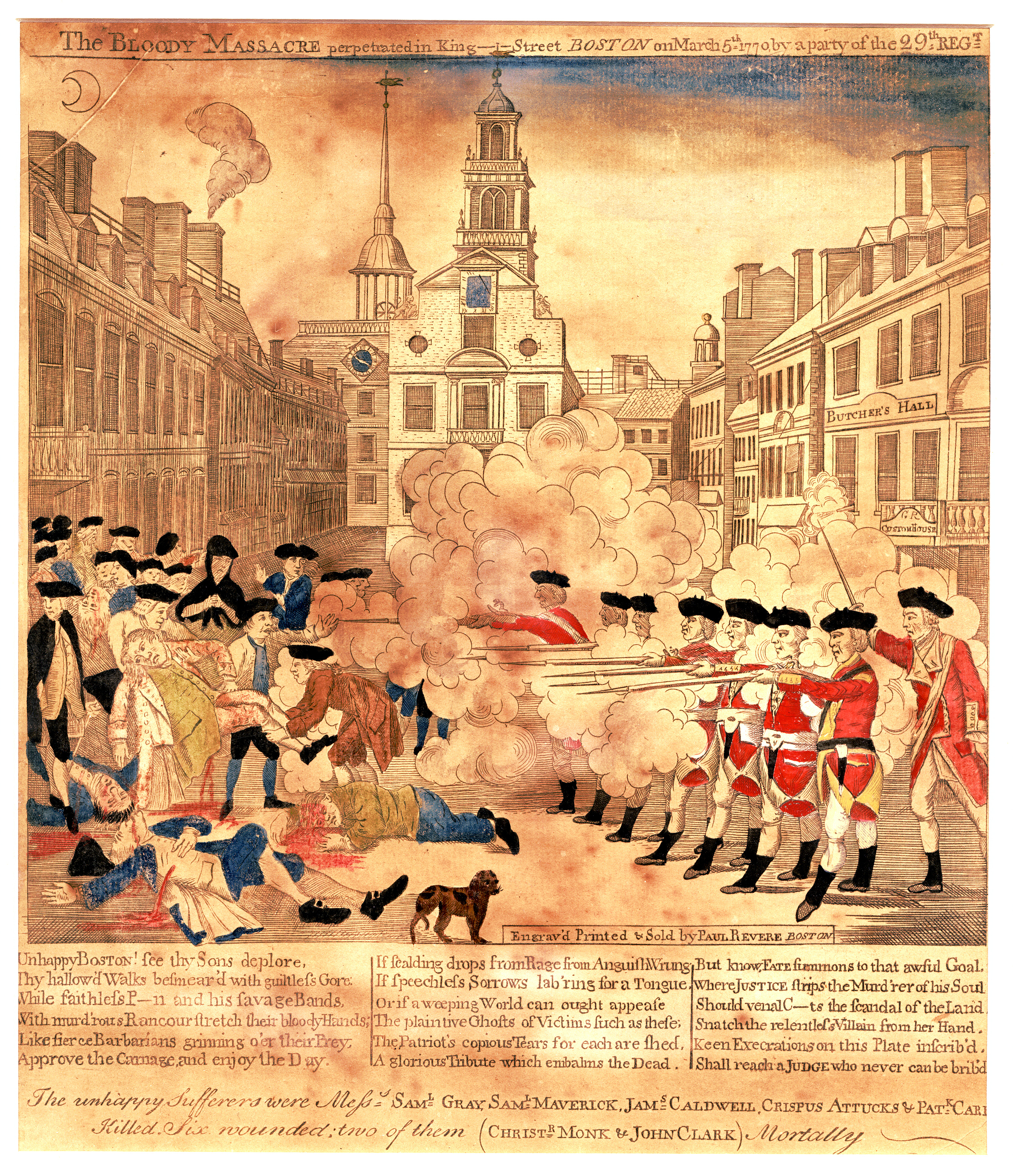
Paul Revere's engraving of the Boston Massacre

- 1740 – Batavia Massacre (Jakarta, Indonesia). Anti-Chinese race riots led by Dutch and Indonesian residents.
- 1742 – Philadelphia Election Riot (Philadelphia, British America)
- 1743 – London Gin Riots (London, England)
- 1754 – Taunton, England
- 1766 – Esquilache Riots (Madrid, Spain)
- 1766 – Food Riots (Black Country and elsewhere, England)
- 1766 – Nottingham cheese riot
- 1768 – Massacre of St George's Fields (London, England)
- 1769 – Spitalfield Riots (Spitalfields, London, England)
- 1770 – Boston Massacre (Boston, British America)
- 1771 – Plague Riot (Moscow, Russia)
- 1772 – Pine Tree Riot (Weare, New Hampshire, British America)
- 1773 – Boston Tea Party Boston, British America
- 1775 – Flour War (France)
- 1780 – Gordon Riots (London, England)
- 1788 – Doctors' Riot (New York City)
- 1789 – Réveillon Riots (Paris, France)
- 1791 – Priestley Riots (Birmingham, England)
- 1793 – Ebel Riot (Stockholm, Sweden)
- 1794 – Whiskey Rebellion (Western Pennsylvania, United States)
- 1795 – Revolt of the housewives (England)
- 1798 – Vienna flag riot (Vienna, Austrian Empire)
- 1797 – Massacre of Tranent (East Lothian, Scotland)

== 19th century ==
- 1809 – Old Price Riots, 1809 (London, England)
- 1811–1812 – English Luddite Riots (Leicester/York, England)
- 1816 – Ely and Littleport riots of 1816
- 1816 – Spa Fields riots
- 1819 – Hep-Hep riots (Germany)
- 1826 December – Eggnog riot (United States Military Academy, West Point, New York)
- 1829 – Cincinnati riots of 1829 (Cincinnati, United States)
- 1830 – Swing Riots (south and east of England)
- 1830 – Opera Riot (Belgium)
- 1831 – Cholera Riots (Sevastopol/Saint Petersburg, Russia)
- 1831 – Merthyr Rising (Merthyr Tydfil, South Wales)
- 1831 – 1831 reform riots (various places in England)
- 1831 – 1831 Bristol riots (Bristol, England)
- 1833 – Coldbath Fields riot (Calthorpe Estate near Gray's Inn Road, Coldbath Fields, Clerkenwell, Islington, London)
- 1833 – Sylvester Graham Riot (Providence, United States)
- 1834 – Anti-abolitionist riots (New York City, United States)
- 1834 – Sylvester Graham Riot (Portland, United States)
- 1835 – Baltimore bank riot (Baltimore, United States)
- 1835 August – Snow Riot: Lynch mob and riots in Washington, D.C. over a drunken attack by slave Arthur Bowen against his mistress, Anna Thornton
- 1836 – Cincinnati riots of 1836 (Cincinnati, United States)
- 1836 – Abolition Riot of 1836 (Boston, United States)
- 1837 – Flour Riot (New York City, United States)
- 1837 – Sylvester Graham Riot (Boston, United States)
- 1838 – Rabulist riots (Stockholm, Sweden)
- 1838 – Pennsylvania Hall riots (Philadelphia, United States)
- 1839 – Newport Rising (Newport, South Wales)

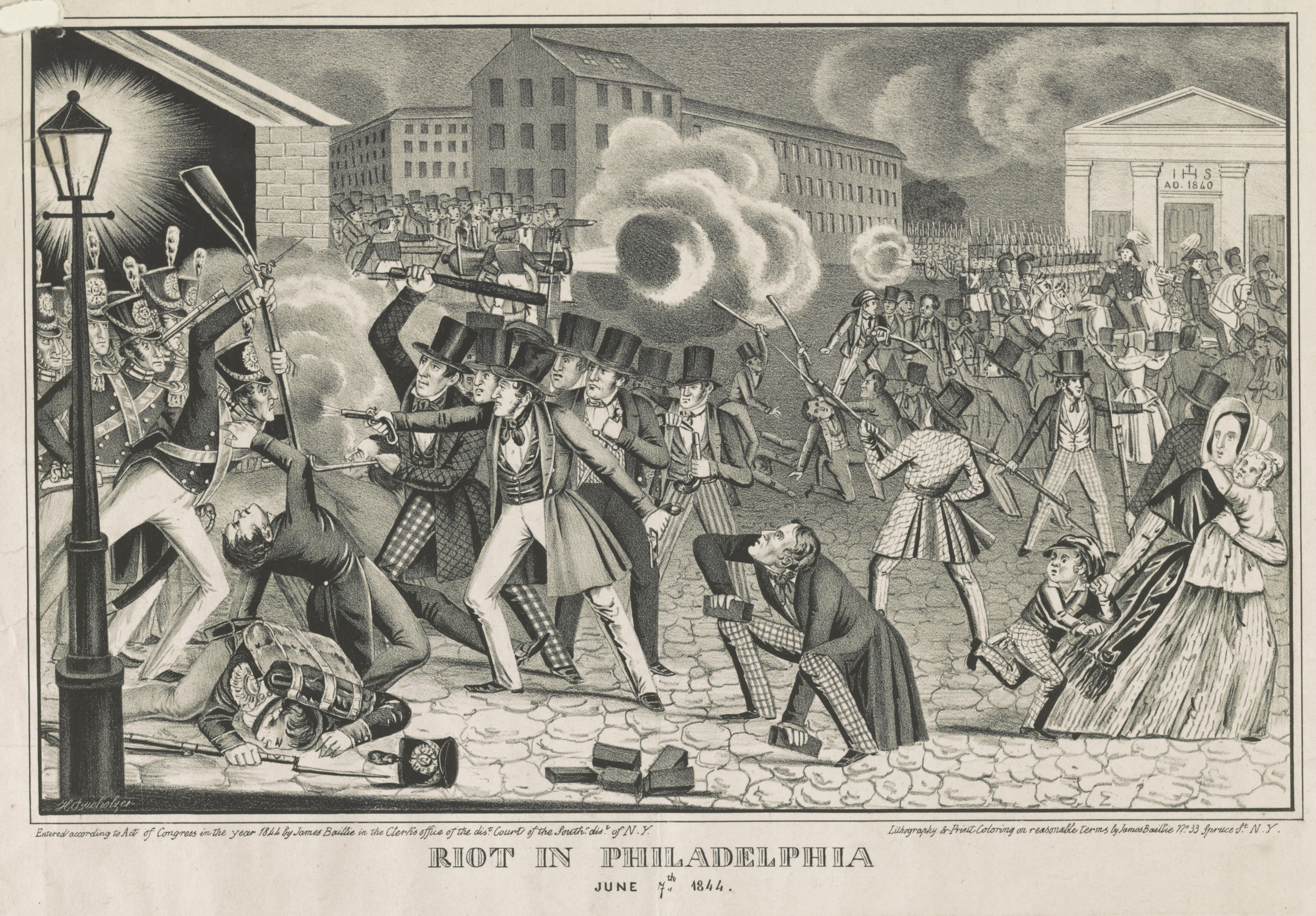
1844 Philadelphia nativist riots

- 1839–1843 – Rebecca Riots (Wales)
- 1841 – Cincinnati riots of 1841 (Cincinnati, United States)
- 1841–1842 – Potato Riots (Russian Empire)
- 1842 – Plug Plot Riots (England)
- 1842 – Lombard Street riot (Philadelphia, United States)
- 1844 – Beer riots in Bavaria (Bavaria, independent at the time, later part of Germany)
- 1844 – Philadelphia Nativist Riots (Philadelphia, United States)
- 1848 – Marsoroligheterna (Stockholm, Sweden)
- 1849 – Genoa (Kingdom of Sardinia – actual Italy)
- 1849 – Stony Monday Riot (Bytown, Upper Canada, Canada)
- 1849 – Montreal Riots (Montreal, Lower Canada, Canada)
- 1849 – Astor Place Riot (New York City, United States)
- 1850 – Squatters' Riot (California, United States)
- 1851 – Christiana Riot (Christiana, Pennsylvania)
- 1851 – Anti-Catholic Riots, Singapore
- 1853 – Cincinnati riot of 1853 (Cincinnati), United States
- 1854 – Hokkien–Teochew Riots, Singapore
- 1855 – Bloody Monday (Louisville, Kentucky, United States)
- 1855 – Portland Rum Riot (Portland, Maine, United States)

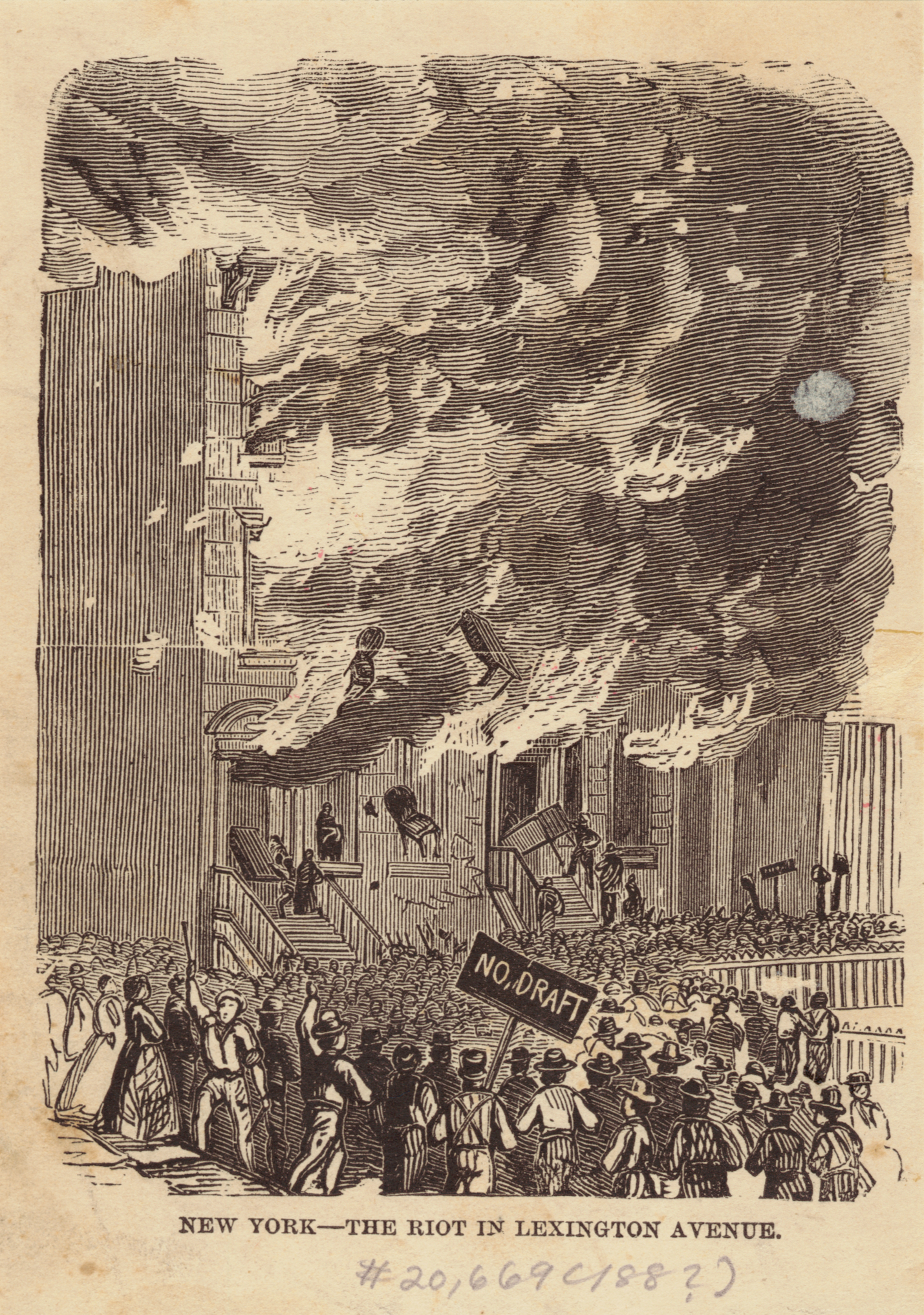
The New York City Draft Riots

- 1855 – Lager Beer Riot (Chicago, United States)
- 1856 – Know-Nothing Riot of 1856 (Baltimore, United States)
- 1857 – Know-Nothing Riot (Washington, D.C., United States)
- 1857 – New York City Police Riot (New York, United States)
- 1860 – Lambing Flat riots (New South Wales, now in Australia)
- 1861 – Election Riots (St. John's, Newfoundland and Labrador)
- 1862 – 1862 Brooklyn riot (Brooklyn, New York, United States)
- 1862 – Buffalo riot of 1862 (Buffalo, New York, United States)
- 1863 – Richmond Bread Riot (Richmond, Virginia, Confederate States of America)
- 1863 – New York City draft riots (New York City, United States)
- 1864 – Leicester balloon riot (Leicester, United Kingdom)
- 1866 – Memphis Riots of 1866 (Memphis, Tennessee), United States
- 1866 – New Orleans Riot (New Orleans, United States)
- 1868 – Pulaski Riot (Pulaski, Tennessee, United States)
- 1868 – Camilla riot (Camilla, Georgia), United States
- 1870 – New York City Orange Riot (New York City, United States)
- 1871 – Second New York City Orange Riot (New York City, United States)
- 1871 – Meridian race riot of 1871 (Meridian, Mississippi)
- 1871 – Los Angeles anti-Chinese riot (Los Angeles, United States)
- 1873 – Colfax Riot (Colfax, Louisiana, United States)
- 1874 – Election Riot of 1874 (Barbour County, Alabama, United States)
- 1874 – Tompkins Square Riot (New York City, United States)
- 1874 – Battle of Liberty Place New Orleans, United States
- 1876 – Hamburg Massacre (Hamburg, South Carolina), United States
- 1879 – Sydney Riot of 1879 (Sydney, New South Wales, now in Australia)
- 1881 – Canboulay Riots (Trinidad, later part of Trinidad and Tobago)
- 1884 – Hosay Riots (Trinidad, later part of Trinidad and Tobago)
- 1884 – Cincinnati riots of 1884 (Cincinnati, Ohio, United States)
- 1885 – Rock Springs massacre (Rock Springs, Wyoming, United States)
- 1885 – Tacoma riot of 1885 (Tacoma, Washington, United States)
- 1885 – Issaquah riot of 1885 (Issaquah, Washington, United States)
- 1886 – Haymarket affair (Chicago, United States)
- 1886 – Seattle riot of 1886 (Seattle, United States)
- 1886 – Belfast Home Rule Riots (Belfast, Northern Ireland)
- 1886 – Bay View Labor Riot (Milwaukee, Wisconsin, United States)
- 1891 – 1891 Belgrade riot (Belgrade, Serbia)
- 1896 – Newlyn riots (Cornwall, United Kingdom)
- 1897 – Badeni riots (Prague, Austria-Hungary)
- 1898 – Wilmington massacre (Wilmington, North Carolina, United States)

== 20th century ==
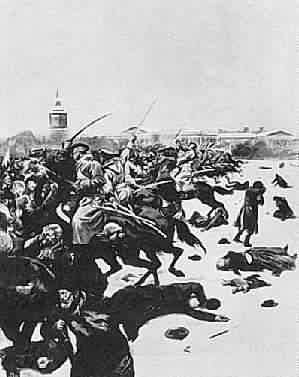
Bloody Sunday massacre in Saint Petersburg

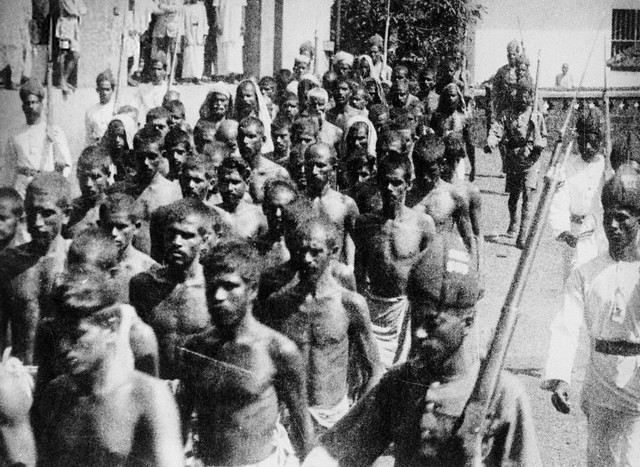
Captured Moplah prisoners taken after a battle with British troops in Moplah rebellion of 1921–22

- 1900 – Robert Charles riots (New Orleans, United States)
- 1903 – Chișinău pogrom (Chişinău, Russia, now in Moldova)
- 1904 – Vaccine Revolt (Rio de Janeiro, Brazil)
- 1905 – Hibiya Incendiary Incident (Japan)
- 1905 – Broome riots (Australia)
- 1905 – Bloody Sunday (Saint Petersburg, Russia)
- 1905 – Pagoda riots Cantonese versus Hakka clans (Mauritius)
- 1906 – Atlanta race riot (Atlanta, United States)
- 1907 – Bellingham riots (Bellingham, Washington, United States)
- 1907 – Brown Dog riots, (London, United Kingdom])
- 1908 – Springfield Race Riot (Springfield, Illinois, United States)
- 1909 – Tragic Week (Catalonia, Spain)

=== 1910s ===
- 1910 – Black Friday Riot (London)
- 1910 – Tonypandy Riot (South Wales, United Kingdom)
- 1911 – Champagne Riots (France)
- 1911 – 1911 Curepipe riots (Mauritius)
- 1911 – Vienna inflation riot (Vienna, Austria-Hungary)
- 1912 racial conflict in Forsyth County, Georgia (Forsyth County, Georgia, United States)
- 1915 – The first and second Battle of the Wazzir
- 1915 – Anti-German riots across Britain in retaliation for the sinking of the RMS Lusitania
- 1916 – Everett massacre (Everett, Washington, United States)
- 1916 – Liverpool riot of 1916 (Sydney, Australia)
- 1917 – 1917 Bath riots (El Paso, United States)
- 1917 – East St. Louis Riot (St. Louis, Missouri and East St. Louis, Illinois, United States)
- 1917 – Quebec Easter riots (Quebec, Canada)
- 1917 – Houston riot of 1917 (Houston, United States)
- 1918 – Rice Riots of 1918 (Japan)
- 1918 – 1918 Kudus riot an anti-Chinese pogrom in Semarang Regency, Dutch East Indies
- 1918 – 1918 Toronto anti-Greek riot, Toronto, Ontario, Canada, involved 5,000 veterans destroying and looting over 20 Greek businesses causing $100,000 damage, 16 police and 150 rioting veterans and civilians were hurt
- 1918/19 – Red Flag Riots, Queensland, Australia, largely undertaken by members of the First Australian Imperial Force
- 1919 – Battle of Bow Street (Bow Street, London)
- 1919 – Jallianwala Bagh massacre, Jallianwala Bagh, Punjab, British India
- 1919 – Luton Peace Day Riots, (Luton, England)
- 1919 – Red Summer (United States)
- 1919 – Annapolis riot of 1919 (United States)
- 1919 – May Day Riots (Cleveland, United States)
- 1919 – Jenkins County, Georgia (United States)
- 1919 – Charleston, South Carolina (United States)
- 1919 – Bisbee, Arizona (United States)
- 1919 – Longview, Texas (United States)
- 1919 – Knoxville, Tennessee (United States)
- 1919 – Omaha, Nebraska (United States)
- 1919 – Chicago race riot (Chicago, United States)
- 1919 – Washington, D.C. (United States)
- 1919 – Boston Police Strike (Boston, United States)
- 1919 – Elaine massacre (Elaine, Arkansas, United States)
- 1919 – Bloody Saturday (Winnipeg, Manitoba, Canada)

=== 1920s ===
- 1920 – Nebi Musa riots (British Mandate of Palestine, later Israel)
- 1921 – Black Wall Street Massacre
- 1921 – March Action (Mansfeld Land, Germany)
- 1921 – Jaffa riots (British Mandate of Palestine, later Israel, May 1–7, 1921)
- 1921 – Tulsa race massacre (Tulsa, Oklahoma, United States)
- 1921 – Belfast's Bloody Sunday (10 July 1921 in Belfast, Northern Ireland)
- 1921 – Bloody Night (19 October 1921, in Lisbon, Portugal)
- 1921 – Prince of Wales Riots (19-22 November in Bombay, British India)
- 1921–1922 – Moplah Riots (Southern Malabar, British India, later India)
- 1922 – Harry Thuku Riot, Nairobi, Kenya, March 15–16. The violence and its suppression lasted a minute or two at the most.
- 1922 – Herrin Massacre (Herrin, Illinois, United States)
- 1923 – Hamburg Uprising (Hamburg, Germany, on October 23, 1923)
- 1923 – Rosewood massacre (Rosewood, Florida)
- 1927 – Nagpur riots of 1927 (Nagpur, India)
- 1929 – Blutmai (Berlin, Germany)
- 1929 – Hebron–Safed riots (British Mandate of Palestine, later Israel)

=== 1930s ===
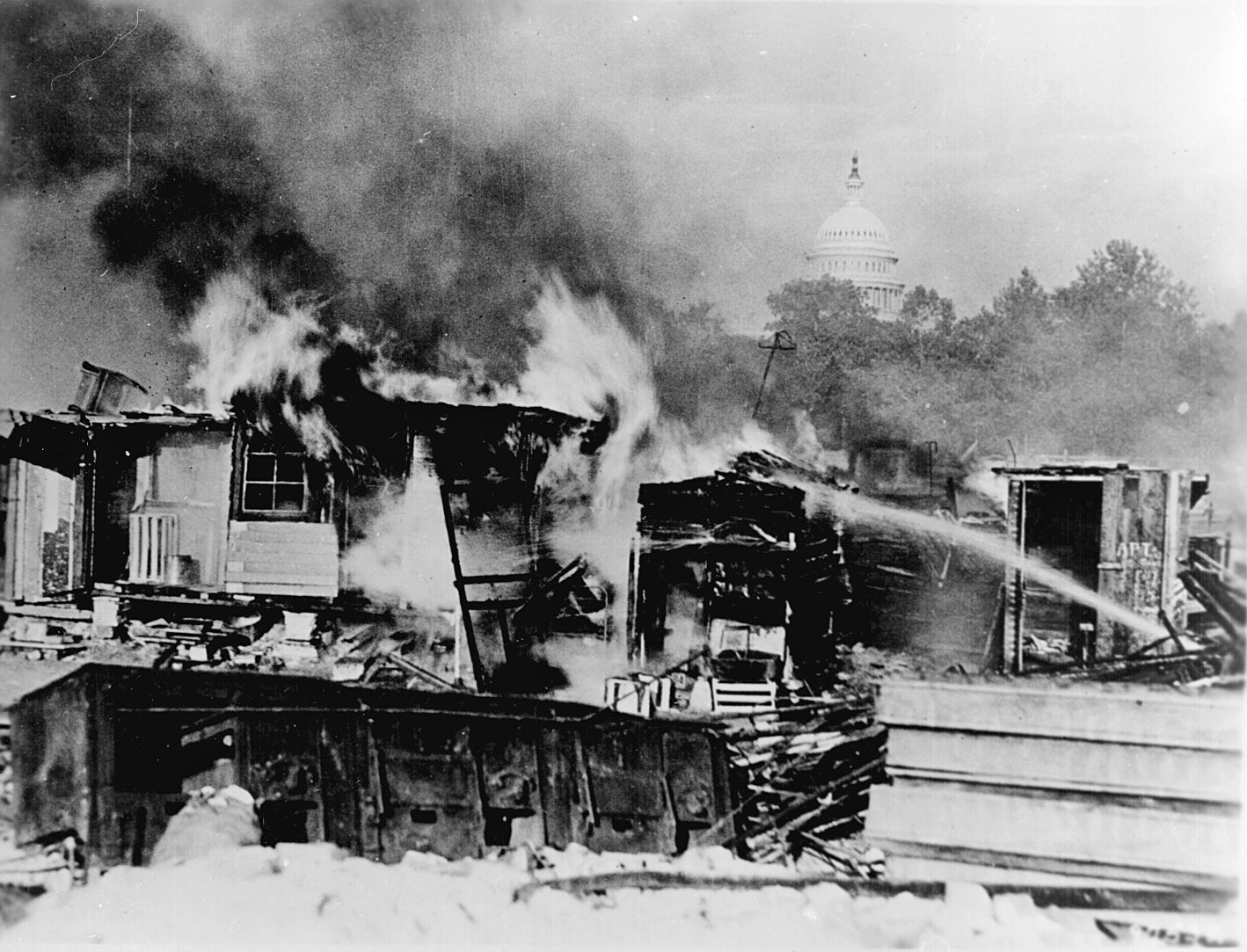
Fires rage during the Bonus Army March

- 1931 – Hawaii Riot (Hawaii, United States)
- 1932 – 1932 Colonial Building riot (St. John's, Dominion of Newfoundland, later Newfoundland and Labrador)
- 1932 – Queen Street unemployment riot (Auckland, New Zealand)
- 1932 – Altona Bloody Sunday (Hamburg, Germany)
- 1932 – Ford Hunger March (Dearborn, United States)
- 1932 – Bonus Army March, Spring/Summer, Washington, D.C., United States
- 1933 – Christie Pits riot - clash between Jewish and pro-Nazi demonstrators in Toronto, Ontario, Canada.
- 1933 – Palestine riots (British Mandate of Palestine, later Israel and the Occupied Palestinian territories)
- 1934 – Copley Street riot (Cork, Ireland)
- 1934 – U.S. Nazi Riot (New York City, New York, United States)
- 1934 – Minneapolis Teamsters Strike of 1934 Minneapolis
- 1935 – Harlem Race Riot (New York City, United States)
- 1935 – Regina Riot (Regina, Saskatchewan, Canada)
- 1935 – Battle of Ballantyne Pier (Vancouver, British Columbia, Canada)
- 1936 – Battle of Cable Street (London, England)
- 1936 – Bhagalpur riots of 1936 (Bhagalpur, India)
- 1936–1939 – Arab Revolt (British Mandate of Palestine, later Israel)
- 1937 – Memorial Day massacre of 1937 (Chicago, United States)
- 1937 – Uba riots of 1937 August 1937 Mauritian sugar cane growers versus sugar mill owners at Union Flacq Sugar Estate, Mauritius
- 1938 – Bloody Sunday (1938) (Vancouver, British Columbia, Canada)

=== 1940s ===
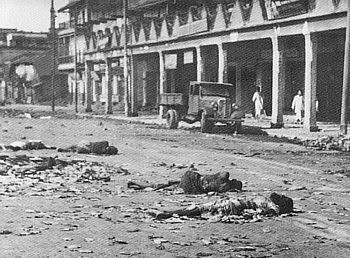
Dead and wounded after the 'Direct Action Day' battle between Hindus and Muslims

- 1941 – Ossewabrandwag attacks on South African Union Defence Force February 1 (Johannesburg, South Africa)
- 1942 – Battle of Manners Street (Wellington, New Zealand)
- 1943 – Easter Riots (Uppsala, Sweden)
- 1943 – Belle Vue Harel Massacre Anjalay (Mauritius)
- 1943 – Zoot Suit Riots (Los Angeles, California, United States)
- 1943 – Detroit Race Riot (1943) (Detroit, United States)
- 1943 – Beaumont Race Riot of 1943 (Beaumont, Texas, United States)
- 1943 – Harlem Riot (New York, United States)
- 1944 – Fort Lawton Riot (Washington, United States)
- 1944 – The Montreal and Verdun Zoot-Suit disturbances of June 1944 (Montreal, Quebec, Canada)
- 1944 – Agana race riot (Agana, Guam)
- 1945 – Hanaoka mine riot by Chinese workers, Ōdate, Akita, Japan
- 1945 – Halifax Riot (Halifax, Nova Scotia, Canada)
- 1945 – Helwan Riots, Egypt
- 1946 – Direct Action Day, India
- 1946 – Nylon riots, United States
- 1946 – Bhagalpur riots of 1946 (Bhagalpur, India)
- 1947 – Jerusalem Riots (British Mandate of Palestine, later Israel)
- 1947 – Partition riots, India and modern-day Pakistan and Bangladesh, the hardest hit region was the densely populated state of Punjab (today divided between India and Pakistan), death toll estimates between 500,000 and 2,000,000, the deadliest riots known to humankind.
- 1948 – Accra Riots (Gold Coast, now renamed Ghana)
- 1948 – Bogotá riots, named Bogotazo (Bogotá, Colombia)

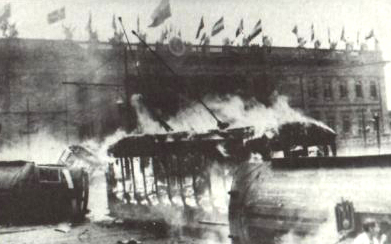
Tram burning in Bogotá, April 9, 1948

- 1949 – Durban Riot, South Africa
- 1949 – Peekskill Riot (Peekskill, New York, United States)
- 1949 – Icelandic NATO Riot of the thirtieth of March (Austurvöllur, Reykjavík, Iceland)

=== 1950s ===
- 1950 – Maria Hertogh riots December 11–13, Singapore
- 1950 – Belgian anti-royalism riots Spring–August 1950 (Belgium)
- 1952 – Black Saturday riots and fire (January 26, Cairo, Egypt)
- 1953 – East German Uprising, June 16–17, 1953 (Berlin and Eastern Germany)
- 1953 Lahore riots, Anti-Ahmadiyya riots in Lahore, West Pakistan, around 2000 Ahmadis killed.
- 1955 – The Richard Riot March 17, Montreal, Quebec, Canada
- 1955 – Hock Lee bus riots 12 May (Singapore)
- 1955 – Istanbul Riots September 6–7, Istanbul, Turkey
- 1956 – Hungarian Revolution of 1956 (October 23 – November 10, 1956, Hungary).
- 1956 – Chinese Middle School riots October 24–28 (Singapore)
- 1956 – Hong Kong 1956 riots (Hong Kong)
- 1956 – Gal Oya riots (Sri Lanka).
- 1957 – Little Rock Integration Crisis (autumn 1957 Little Rock, Arkansas)
- 1958 – Notting Hill race riots (Notting Hill, London, England)
- 1958 – Sri Lankan riots of 1958 (Sri Lanka)
- 1958 – 1958 Grozny riots, Grozny, Soviet Union
- 1959 – 1959 Congolese Riots, January 4–6, 1959 Leopoldville, Belgian Congo
- 1959 – Tibetan riots against Chinese government, in Lhasa, Tibet Area, China, between March 10 to 21, this is the deadliest riot to take place in a single month and also the second deadliest riot to take place in a single year (after the 1947 Indian partition riots), a confirmed death toll of around 87,000 people.

=== 1960s ===
- 1961 - Edmonton Indian Residential School uprising, May St. Albert, Alberta
- 1962 – Bettors Riot at Yonkers Raceway, May 30, Yonkers, New York
- 1962 – Novocherkassk riots, June (Novocherkassk, Soviet Union)
- 1962 – Ole Miss riot of 1962, September 30, University of Mississippi
- 1963 – Cambridge riot 1963, June 14, Cambridge, Maryland
- 1963 – Roosevelt Raceway Riot, November 8, Westbury, New York
- 1964 – 1964 East Pakistan riots
- 1964 – National Stadium Tragedy Riot, May 24, Estadio Nacional, Lima, Peru
- 1964 – Harlem race riot, July 18–23 (New York City, United States)
- 1964 – 1964 Race Riots, July 21 – August 2 and September 3 (Singapore)
- 1964 – Rochester 1964 race riot, July 24–25 (Rochester, New York, United States)
- 1964 – Jersey City 1964 race riot, August 2–4 (Jersey City, New Jersey, United States)
- 1964 – Elizabeth 1964 race riot, August 11–13 (Elizabeth, New Jersey, United States)
- 1964 – Dixmoor 1964 race riot August 16–17 (Chicago, United States)
- 1964 – Philadelphia 1964 race riot August 28–30
- 1965 – Mangalmé riots September 2 – October (Guéra Prefecture, Chad)
- 1965 – 1965 Mauritius race riots May 10, 1965 Trois Boutiques (Souillac) followed by Mahébourg; Creoles versus Hindus. State of Emergency.
- 1965 – Watts riots, August 1965 (Los Angeles, United States)
- 1965 – Anti-Chinese riots in Indonesia.
- 1966 – Hong Kong 1966 riots (aka Kowloon riots), April 1966 (Hong Kong)
- 1966 – Division Street riots, June 12–14 (Humboldt Park, Chicago, United States)
- 1966 – Hough Riots, July 1966 (Cleveland, United States)
- 1966 – Compton's Cafeteria Riot, August 1966 (San Francisco, United States)
- 1966 – Benton Harbor Riot, August–September 1966 (Benton Harbor, Michigan, United States)
- 1966 – Sunset Strip curfew riots (Los Angeles, United States)
- 1966 – Mauritius race riots (prior to August 1967 general elections)
- 1967 – Bhagalpur riots of 1967 (Bhagalpur, India)
- 1967 – Tampa riots of 1967, June 1967 (Tampa, Florida, United States)
- 1967 – Buffalo riot of 1967, June 27 (Buffalo, New York, United States)
- 1967 – 1967 Newark riots, July 12–18, 1967 (Newark, New Jersey, United States)
- 1967 – 1967 Plainfield riots, July 14–20, 1967 (Plainfield, New Jersey, United States)
- 1967 – 12th Street Riot, July 23–27, 1967 (Detroit, United States)
- 1967 – Cambridge riot of 1967, July 24, 1967 Cambridge, Maryland
- 1967 – Cairo riot, July 17 (Cairo, Illinois, United States)
- 1967 – Winston-Salem 1967 race riot, November 2–4, 1967 (Winston-Salem, North Carolina, United States)
- 1967 – Hong Kong 1967 riots (Hong Kong)
- 1968 – 1968 Mauritian riots Pre-Independence Mauritius racial riots January 1968 started at Plaine Verte, Port Louis; Creoles versus Hindus and Muslims
- 1968 – Battle of Valle Giulia, March 1, 1968 (Rome, Italy)
- 1968 – 1968 Washington, D.C. riots, April 1968 (Washington, D.C., United States)
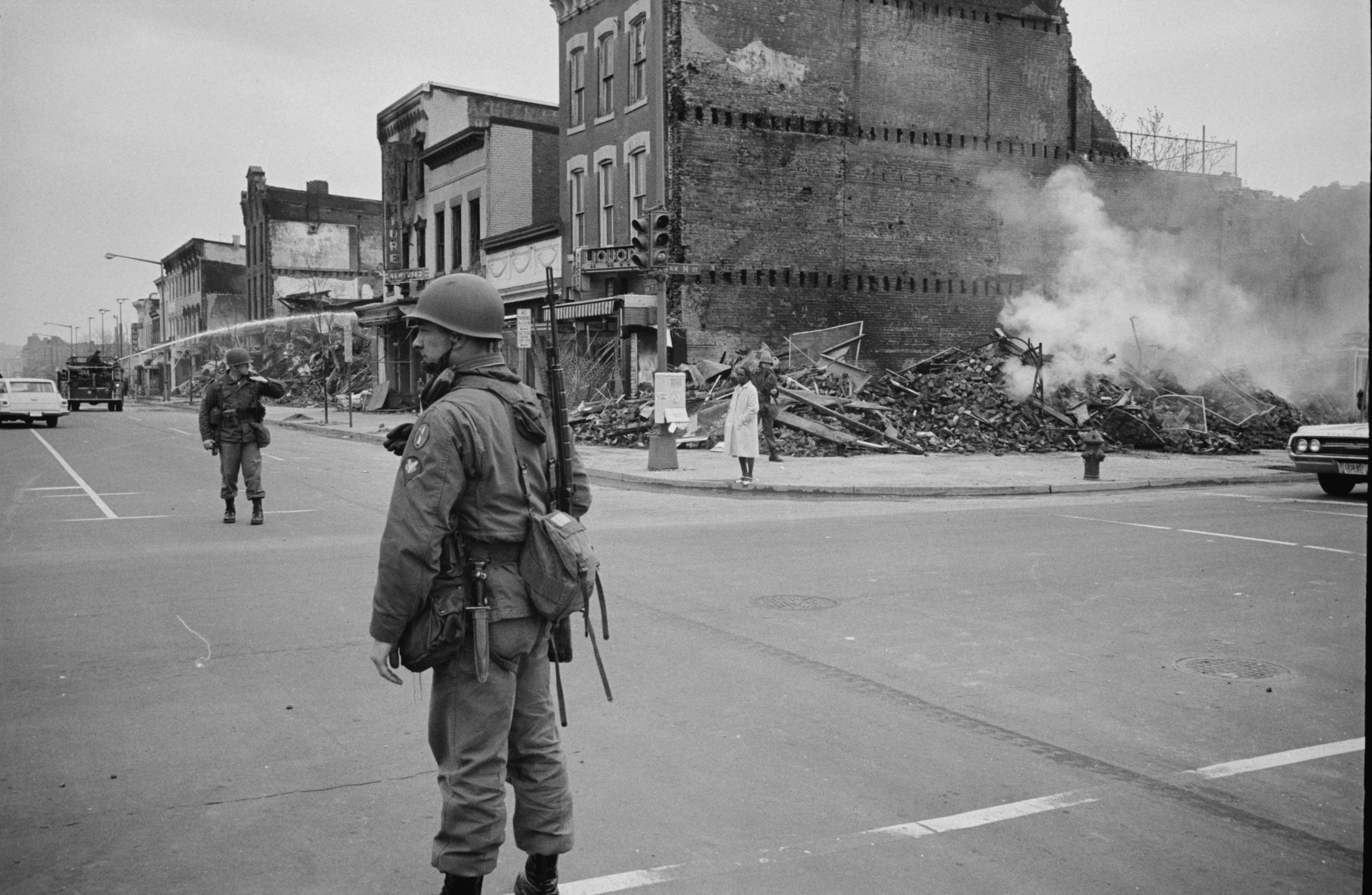
  The aftermath of a Washington, D.C. riot in April 1968
- 1968 – Baltimore riot of 1968, April 6–12 (Baltimore, United States)
- 1968 – Chicago riots of 1968 April 7–14 (Chicago, United States)
- 1968 – Kansas City riot of 1968, April 1968 (Kansas City, Missouri, United States)
- 1968 – May 1968 popular uprising (France)
- 1968 – Shinjuku riot (Shinjuku, Tokyo, Japan)
- 1968 – JCH Riot in outrage over Hartwick College's schism from the Lutheran Church
- 1968 – Louisville riots of 1968, May 27 (Louisville, Kentucky, United States)
- 1968 – Glenville Shootout (Cleveland, Ohio, United States)
- 1968 - Bloody Friday, June 1968 in Rio de Janeiro, Brazil
- 1968 – Saint-Jean-Baptiste Day riot (Montreal, Quebec, Canada)
- 1968 – Wooster Ave. riot of July 1968 (Akron, Ohio, United States)
- 1968 – 1968 Democratic National Convention riot, August 1968 (Chicago, Illinois, United States)
- 1968 - Battle of Maria Antonia, October 1968 in São Paulo, Brazil
- 1968 – Rodney Riots (Kingston, Jamaica)
- 1969 – Burntollet Bridge incident (near Derry, Northern Ireland on January 4, 1969)
- 1969 – 1969 Race Riots of Singapore
- 1969 – Czechoslovak Hockey Riots (1969)
- 1969 – Sir George Williams Computer Riot (Montreal, Quebec, Canada)
- 1969 – Stonewall Riots, June 1969 (New York City, United States)
- 1969 – May 13 race riots, May 13 – July 31, 1969 (Kuala Lumpur, Malaysia)
- 1969 – Battle of the Bogside (Derry, Northern Ireland, on August 12–14, 1969)
- 1969 – 1969 Northern Ireland Riots (throughout Northern Ireland on August 14–17, 1969)
- 1969 – Days of Rage, October 1969 (Chicago, United States)
- 1969 – Murray-Hill riot (Montreal, Quebec, Canada)
- 1969 – 1969 Gujarat riots (September 1969), India
- 1960s – Berkeley riots, a series of riots in (Berkeley, California)

=== 1970s ===
- 1970 – Kent State shootings, May 1970 (Kent, Ohio, United States)
- 1970 – Jackson State killings, May 1970 (Jackson, Mississippi, United States)
- 1970 – Hard Hat Riot, Wall Street, May 8, 1970 (New York City, United States)
- 1970 – Battle of St Matthew's (27–28 June 1970 in Belfast, Northern Ireland)
- 1970 – Falls Curfew (3–5 July 1970 in Belfast, Northern Ireland)
- 1970 – 1970 Memorial Park riot, August 24–27, 1970 (Royal Oak and Birmingham, Michigan, United States)
- 1970 – 1970 Polish protests, December 1970 protests over food prices leading to riots and police killings in Northern Poland
- 1970 – Koza riot, December 20 (Ryukyu Islands, United States, later Okinawa Prefecture, Japan)
- 1971 – Gastown Riots, August 1971, Vancouver, British Columbia, Canada
- 1971 – Camden Riots, August 1971 (Camden, New Jersey, United States)
- 1971 – Attica Prison uprising (Attica, New York, United States)
- 1972 – Bloody Sunday (Derry, Northern Ireland on January 30, 1972)
- 1972 – Afrikaanderwijk riots (Rotterdam, Netherlands)
- 1972 – Operation Motorman (Northern Ireland on July 31, 1972)
- 1973 – South Jamaica Riots, April 28, 1973
- 1973 and 1974 – Athens Polytechnic uprising, Greek student riots and revolution at National Technical University of Athens, military junta overthrown (Greece)
- 1974 – Malari Incident (January 15–16 in Jakarta, Indonesia)
- 1974 – Ulster Workers' Council strike (Northern Ireland, May 1974)
- 1974 – Boston Busing Race Riots, anti-busing riots throughout Boston
- 1975 – Chapeltown riot Leeds, West Yorkshire, England
- 1975 – Livernois–Fenkell riot (Detroit, United States)
- 1975 – May 1975 Students protest riots Mauritius, Indian Ocean
- 1976 – Land Day protest, Massive strike by Israeli Arabs in protest at a government plan to expropriate lands in the Galilee (Israel)
- 1976 – Notting Hill Carnival Riot (London, England)
- 1976 – Soweto Riots (Soweto, South Africa)
- 1977 – 1977 Egyptian Bread Riots, January 1977 (Egypt)
- 1977 – Sri Lankan riots of 1977 (Sri Lanka)
- 1977 – Tampa Led Zeppelin riots of 1977, {Tampa, Florida}
- 1978 – Haredi riot, Brooklyn
- 1978 – Moody Park riots, May 1978 (Houston)
- 1978 – Ali Must Go riots, April 1978 (Nigeria)
- 1979 – Disco Demolition Night (Chicago, United States)
- 1979 – White Night gay riots, May 1979 (San Francisco)
- 1979 – Southall riots (Southall, West London)
- 1979 – Star Hotel riot (Newcastle, New South Wales, Australia)

=== 1980s ===
- 1980 – New Mexico State Penitentiary Riot: conditions in the penitentiary were terrible and overcrowding of the prison. It killed 33 and injured more than 200.
- 1980 – Arthur McDuffie riots, May 1980 (Miami, United States)
- 1980 — 1980 World 600 Qualifying Riot, May 1980, Concord, North Carolina
- 1980 – Racial riot in Central Java, Indonesia
- 1980 – St Pauls riot, April 1980 (St Pauls, Bristol, England)
- 1980 – Vondelstraat Riots (Amsterdam, Netherlands)
- 1980 – Amsterdam coronation riots (Amsterdam, the Netherlands)
- 1981 – 1981 Toronto bathhouse riots, February 1981 (Toronto, Ontario, Canada)
- 1981 – 1981 Irish hunger strike riots (Northern Ireland)
- 1981 – Brixton riot of 1981 (London, England)
- 1981 – Toxteth riots (Liverpool, England)
- 1981 – Moss Side riots (Manchester, England)
- 1981 – Chapeltown riot Leeds, England
- 1981 – Handsworth Riots (Birmingham, England)
- 1982 – Washington Anti-Klan protest 1982, November 1982 (Washington, D.C., United States)
- 1982 – Overtown Riot, December 1982 (Miami, United States)
- 1983 – Assam Riot
- 1983 – Polish Pro-Solidarity Riots, May. 1 (Poland)
- 1983 – Anti-Tamil Riots (Western and Southern Provinces, Sri Lanka)
- 1984 – Tunisian bread riots (Tunisia)
- 1984 – 1984 anti-Sikh riots (mainly Delhi but also other parts of India)
- 1984 – Aggieville Riot (Manhattan, Kansas)
- 1984 – Queen Street Riot, December 7, 1984. (Auckland, New Zealand)
- 1985 – Drumcree riots (Portadown, Northern Ireland, July 1985)
- 1985 – Durban Riots, August 8 (Durban, South Africa)
- 1985 – Brixton riot of 1985, September 28 (London)
- 1985 – Second Handsworth riots, September 11 (Birmingham, England)
- 1985 – Broadwater Farm Riot, October 6 (Tottenham, London, England)
- 1986 – Egyptian Conscription Riot, February 25 (Egypt)
- 1986 – 1986 Sabah riots, March 12 (Sabah, Malaysia)
- 1985 – Drumcree riots (Portadown, Northern Ireland, July 1986)
- 1986 – Clontibret invasion (7 August 1986 in Clontibret, Ireland)
- 1986 – U.S. Open of Surfing, August 31 (Huntington Beach, California, United States)
- 1986 – Battle of Ryesgade, October 14–22 (Copenhagen, Denmark)
- 1987 – Chapeltown riot Leeds, England
- 1987 – 1987 Tampa riots, February 1987 (Tampa, Florida, United States)
- 1987 – Anti-Sikh Riots of Delhi
- 1987 – Iranian pilgrim riot (Mecca, Saudi Arabia)
- 1987–1989 – Tibetan Anti-China Riots, September 27, 1987 (Lhasa, Tibet)
- 1987 – Atlanta prison riots (Atlanta, United States)
- 1987 – First Intifada, Israel
- 1988 – Fremantle prison riot
- 1988 – 8888 Uprising in Myanmar. Nationwide riots against military dictatorship in the country to restore democracy, as many as 10,000 protesters killed when the Myanmar Army brutally suppressed the movement.
- 1988 – Latino riot, Perth Amboy, New Jersey
- 1988 – Tompkins Square Park Police Riot, August 1988 (East Village, Manhattan, New York City)
- 1988 – Hot Biscuit Riot, Shreveport, Louisiana
- 1988–1989 – Nanjing Anti-African protests (Nanjing, China)
- 1988 – Anti Sikh Riots of Bidar, Karnataka
- 1989 – 1989 riots in Argentina
- 1989 – 1989 Sukhumi riots
- 1989 – Dewsbury riot
- 1989 – Tampa riot of 1989, February 1989 (Tampa, Florida, United States)
- 1989 – El Caracazo, February 1989 (Caracas, Venezuela)
- 1989 – Aftermath of Tiananmen Square protests of 1989 (Beijing China)
- 1989 – Romanian Revolution of 1989 (Romania)
- 1989 – 1989 Bhagalpur riots in India
- 1989 – Purple Rain Riot (South Africa)
- 1989 – Anti-Sikh Riots of Jammu

=== 1990–2000 ===
- 1990 – Poll Tax Riots (London, England))
- 1990 – Strangeways Prison Riot (Manchester, England), April 1–25
- 1990 – Dinamo Zagreb–Red Star Belgrade riot (Zagreb, Croatia, at the time part of Yugoslavia)
- 1990 – Golaniada (Bucharest, Romania), demonstrations against communism
- 1990 – Hyderabad Riots – Over 150 people killed. Communal riots occurred due to the killing of Sardar and Majid Khan.
- 1990 – 1990 Mass Uprising in Bangladesh against military dictator Lt. Gen. Ershad, who is forced to resign on December 6, and restore democracy in the country. December 6 has since been celebrated as democracy victory day in Bangladesh.
- 1990 – 1990 Airin Riots (Osaka, Japan), October 2–5
- 1991 – 1991 Washington, D.C. riot in Mount Pleasant neighborhood, May 1991 (Washington, D.C., United States)
- 1991 – Riverport Riot, at Riverport Amphitheater during a Guns N' Roses concert, July 2
- 1991 – Crown Heights Riot, August 1991 (Brooklyn, New York, United States)
- 1991 – 1991 Moscow August Putsch, GKChP (Russian: ГКЧП) riot, or "August Coup Attempt", August 19–21, 1991 (Moscow, Soviet Union)
- 1991 – Ely Petrol Riots, 2–6 September, (Cardiff, Wales)
- 1991 – Meadow Well riots, 9–12 September, (North Shields, England) one of the most severe riots in British history
- 1991 – Hoyerswerda riots, 17–23 September, (Hoyerswerda, Germany)
- 1992 – Los Angeles riots, April 29 – May 4 (Los Angeles, United States)
- 1992 – Washington Heights Riot, July 1992 (New York City, New York)
- 1992 – Salford (Greater Manchester, England), July
- 1992 – Chicago Bulls victory riots, June (Chicago, United States)
- 1992 – Montreal, Quebec, Canada – Riot after Guns N' Roses show during the Guns N' Roses/Metallica Stadium Tour.
- 1992 – Demolition of the Babri Masjid, Ayodhya, India. Over 2000 (mostly Muslims) killed in violence.
- 1992 – Riot of Rostock-Lichtenhagen, 22–24 August, Rostock, Germany – most serious xenophobic riots in Germany after World War II
- 1992 – Bombay riots and other inter-communal riots – Riots in the Indian city of Mumbai (formerly Bombay) after the demolition of Babri Mosque in Ayodhya. 6 December 1992 – 26 January 1993.
- 1992 – Riots in Bangladesh and Pakistan in protest of the demolition of Babri Masjid.
- 1993 – Russian constitutional crisis of 1993 riots, Moscow, Russia
- 1993 – 18 May Riot, Copenhagen, Denmark, May 18, 1993
- 1993 – Stanley Cup Riot, Montreal, Quebec, Canada, June 9, 1993
- 1993 – Welling Riots, London, England, October 16, 1993.
- 1994 – 1994 Tehreek-e-Nafaz-e-Shariat-e-Mohammadi Malakand Revolt
- 1994 – Stanley Cup Riot, Vancouver, British Columbia, Canada, June 14, 1994.
- 1994 – Riots against tolls 25 April Bridge, June 24, 1994 Lisbon, Portugal
- 1994 – Green Day Riot, Boston, Massachusetts, September 9, 1994.
- 1994 – 1990s uprising in Bahrain, 35 killed, 1994–1999.
- 1995 – 1995 Gazi Quarter riots, 23 killed, March 1995, Istanbul, Turkey
- 1995 – Brixton riot of 1995 (London, England)
- 1995 – Manningham riot, June 1995 (Bradford, West Yorkshire, England)
- 1995 – Lansdowne Road football riot, English Neo-Nazi Hooliganism (Lansdowne Road, Dublin, Ireland)
- 1995 – Drumcree riots, July 1995 (Portadown, Northern Ireland)
- 1996 – Yatala Prison Riot, May 6, 1996 (Yatala Labour Prison, Adelaide, South Australia)
- 1996 – Riots in Trafalgar Square during UEFA Euro 96, June 26, 1996 (London, England)
- 1996 – Drumcree riots, July 1996 (throughout Northern Ireland)
  - Derry riots
- 1996 – Parliament House Riot, August 19, 1996 (Canberra, Australia)
- 1996 – Western Wall Tunnel riots, September 1996 (Jerusalem)
- 1996 – St. Petersburg, Florida Riot 1996, October 1996 (St. Petersburg, Florida, United States)
- 1997 – Naples, Idaho, January 1997 – Five persons were injured in a riot at Northwest Academy, a troubled teen facility associated with CEDU.
- 1997 – Drumcree riots of July 1997 (throughout Northern Ireland)
- 1998 – Pullman (WSU) Riot, May 1998 (Pullman, Washington)
- 1998 – Jakarta Riots of May 1998 (Jakarta, Indonesia)
- 1998 – Drumcree riots, July 1998 (throughout Northern Ireland)
- 1998 – Reformasi (Malaysia)
- 1998 – Poso riots (December 1998 – 2001) in Poso, Central Sulawesi, Indonesia.
- 1999 – Maluku sectarian conflict, January 1999 – February 2002 in Maluku, Indonesia
- 1999 – 1999 Mauritian riots, February 21–25 started in Roche Bois. Spread throughout Mauritius after death in custody of singer Topize "Kaya". Linked to cannabis legalisation.
- 1999 – L'Amicale and Anjalay riots May 23, 1999 Port Louis, Mauritius. Muslim protesters murdered family of Chinese owners of gambling den.
- 1999 – Michigan State University student riot, April 1999 (East Lansing, Michigan, United States)
- 1999 – Iran student riots, July 1999, July 1999, Iran
- 1999 – WTO Ministerial Conference of 1999, November 1999 (Seattle, United States)
- 2000 – Cochabamba protests of 2000 (Cochabamba, Bolivia)
- 2000 – Lakers fans riot after the team was crowned the NBA Champions. It became known as The Laker Riot (Los Angeles, California)
- 2000 – October Riots (Israel)
- 2000 – Al-Aqsa Intifada, Israel
- 2000 – Riots between English and Turkish football fans break out in Copenhagen, Denmark, after the final of the 1999–2000 UEFA Cup,
- 2000 – Chinese anti-corruption riot, (Yangjiazhangzi, China)
- 2000 – Spanish anti-immigrant riots, (Almería, Spain)
- 2000 – May Day Riots, May 1, 2000 (London).

== 21st century ==
=== 2001–2009 ===
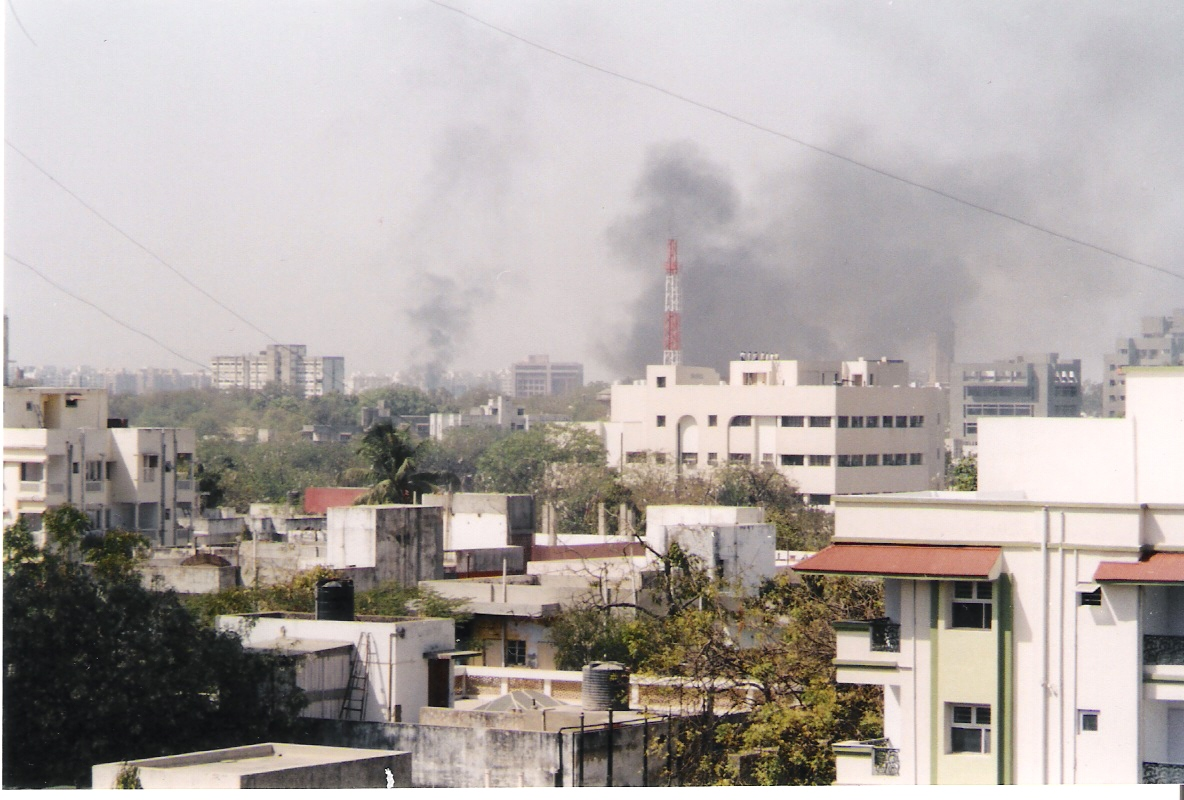
Many of Ahmedabad's buildings were set on fire during the 2002 Gujarat violence

- 2001 – Seattle Mardi Gras riot, February (Seattle, United States)
- 2001 – University of Maryland student riots following team's loss in the 2001 NCAA tournament (College Park, Maryland, United States)
- 2001 – 2001 Cincinnati Riots, April (Cincinnati, United States)
- 2001 – Quebec City Summit of the Americas, April (Quebec, Canada)
- 2001 – May Day Riots, May 1, 2001 (London, England).
- 2001 – Oldham Riots, May (Oldham, Greater Manchester, England)
- 2001 – Kraków Riots, June (Kraków, Poland )
- 2001 – Harehills riot, Leeds, June, (West Yorkshire, England)
- 2001 – Canada Day Riot, July, Edmonton, (Alberta, Canada)
- 2001 – Bradford Riot, July (Bradford, England)
- 2001 – Genoa Group of Eight Summit protest, July (Genoa, Italy)
- 2001 – July 2001 Belfast riots, (Belfast, Northern Ireland)
- 2001 – Holy Cross dispute, Summer (Belfast, Northern Ireland)
- 2001 – November 2001 Belfast riots, (Belfast, Northern Ireland)
- 2001 – December 2001 Riots (Buenos Aires, Argentina)
- 2001 – Ohio State University, First Chittfest block party riot, April (Columbus, Ohio, United States)
- 2002 – San Salvador Atenco Airport Riot (San Salvador Atenco, Mexico)
- 2002 – Post- Godhra Riots after the Godhra train burning, February (Gujarat, India)
- 2002 – Naroda Patiya massacre, happened on February 28, resulted in the death of 97 Muslims by approximately a mob of 5000 people.
- 2002 – University of Maryland students following their team's victory in the 2002 NCAA tournament (College Park, Maryland, United States)
- 2002 – Former military spies riot over their government pension (Seoul, South Korea)
- 2002 – Ohio State University, Second Chittfest block party riot, April 21 (Columbus, Ohio, United States)
- 2002 – 2002 Urso Branco prison riot, (Rondônia, Brazil)
- 2002 – May 2002 Belfast riots, (Belfast, Northern Ireland)
- 2002 – Short Strand Clashes, (Belfast, Northern Ireland)
- 2002 – Chinese textile worker riot, (Shuikou, Guangdong, China)
- 2002 – Soccer hooligans light flares and clash with riot police at a game in Kyiv, Ukraine.
- 2002 – Ohio State University post University of Michigan football game riot, November (Columbus, Ohio, United States)
- 2002 – Riot at Pavoncito Prison (Guatemala City, Guatemala)
- 2002 - Concordia University Netanyahu riot (Concordia University, Montreal, Canada)
- 2003 – Riot in Neos Marmaras (Porto Carras, Sithonia) against the EU-Summit, June 20, (Chalkidiki, Greece)
- 2003 – Benton Harbor Riot, June (Benton Harbor, Michigan, United States)
- 2003 – Wrocław football riot 2003, March 30
- 2003 – Maldives civil unrest, September (Malé, Maldives)
- 2003 – Riot over bad policy during a SARS outbreak, (Xiandie, China)
- 2003 – The Exploited Montreal riot, Montreal, Quebec, Canada October 14
- 2004 - Redfern riots, (Sydney, Australia).
- 2004 – Han–Hui riot, (Henan province, China).
- 2004 – Boston, Lincolnshire, Croydon, and other United Kingdom towns. Fans rioted after England lost to France in their first game of the UEFA Euro 2004 group stage.
- 2004 – 2004 Dublin May Day riot
- 2004 - Palm Island riots, (Queensland, Australia).
- 2004 – Kosovo Riot.
- 2004 – Chinese riot in response to a beating, (Guangdong, China)
- 2004 – Citizens in Benghu riot in response to rising prices and poor healthcare, (Anhui, China)
- 2004 – Chinese soccer fans riot when a Japanese team wins the final, (Beijing, China)
- 2004 – Rioters attack police station December 30 (Athens, Greece)
- 2005 – Dongzhou protest, (Guangdong, China)
- 2005 – 2005 Macquarie Fields riots, February, (southwestern suburb of Sydney, Australia)
- 2005 – Cedar Revolution, February, Lebanon
- 2005 – Anti-Japanese riots, April (Beijing, Shenzhen and Guangzhou, China)
- 2005 – Riots in response to land taken for a power plant, (Shenyou, China)
- 2005 – Riots over excessive pollution, (Zhejiang, China)
- 2005 – Perpignan ethnic violence, May, France
- 2005 – Riots during the Orange Order parade, July (Belfast, Northern Ireland)
- 2005 – Maldives civil unrest, August (Malé, Maldives)
- 2005 – Chinese worker riot, July (Xizhou, China). In 2005, the government admitted to 87,000 riots and demonstrations across China.
- 2005 – 2005 Belfast riots, (Belfast, Northern Ireland)
- 2005 – Street clashes in central Athens, September (Athens, Greece),
- 2005 – 2005 civil unrest in France, October
- 2005 – 2005 Toledo Riot, October (Toledo, Ohio, United States)
- 2005 – Anti-Muslim Riots of Mau, October (Mau, Uttar Pradesh, India)
- 2005 – Mar del Plata Summit of the Americas, November (Mar del Plata, Argentina)
- 2005 – 2005 Cronulla riots, December (Sydney, Australia)
- 2005 – 2005 Birmingham race riots in Lozells, (Birmingham, United Kingdom)
- 2006 – Stanley Cup Western Conference Finals (Edmonton Oilers victory), May 2006, Edmonton, Alberta, Canada
- 2006 – Cartoon riots
- 2006 – 2006 Nuku'alofa riots, November 16 (Nukuʻalofa, Tonga)
- 2006 – 2006 Dublin riots, February 25 (Dublin, Ireland)
- 2006 – San Bernardino punk riot, March 4 San Bernardino, California
- 2006 – 2006 labor protests in France, March–April, (Paris, France)
- 2006 – Burj Khalifa riot (Dubai, United Arab Emirates)
- 2006 – Hindu/Muslim Aligarh Riots, April (Aligarh, India)
- 2006 – April 2006 Venezuela prison riot, April (Venezuela)
- 2006 – 2006 civil unrest in San Salvador Atenco (San Salvador Atenco, Mexico)
- 2006 – Riot after a hospital doesn't treat a patient (Sichuan, China)
- 2006 – Riot over government response to a whistleblower, (Shandong, China)
- 2006 – Riot follows after a traffic accident incites violence, (Chizhou, China)
- 2006 – Riot over a land dispute, (Sanzhou, China)
- 2006 – 2006 protests in Hungary
- 2006 – The October 2006 Mangalore riots were a set of riots in Mangalore, India triggered after Hindu extremist group Bajrang Dal attacked a Van which was transporting cows. Government imposed a curfew for a week. Two people were killed and up to 50 people were injured.
- 2006 – November 2006 Political Riots in Bangladesh. Violent clashes between the two major parties Bangladesh Awami League and Bangladesh Nationalist Party including vandalism and arson attacks leave 40+ dead.
- 2006 – Copenhagen December Riot (Nørrebro, Copenhagen, Denmark)
- 2007 – Anti-immigrant riots, (Madrid, Spain)
- 2007 – 2007 – Guinea-Bissau riot
- 2007 – Chinese immigrants clash with riot police, (Milan, Italy)
- 2007 – Riot starts when a company takes over the bus routes and doubles the fares, (Zhushan, China)
- 2007 – 2007 Karachi riots (Karachi, Pakistan)
- 2007 – G8 Summit Riots, June 2007 in Rostock, Germany
- 2007 – Bronze soldier riot (Tallinn, Estonia)
- 2007 – Muslim-Tibetan riot, (Qinghai, China)
- 2007 – Muslim–Han riot (Shandong, China)
- 2007 – Romani riots (Sofia, Bulgaria)
- 2007 – Georgian anti-government protests, September – December
- 2007 – Burmese anti-government protests
- 2007 – Riots in Villiers-le-Bel, France, November 25–30
- 2007 – Food riots in West Bengal
- 2007–2008 – Kenyan Presidential Election Riots
- 2008 – Striking dock workers clash with riot police at state-controlled Piraeus (OLP) and Thessaloniki (OLTH) ports Greece, Jan 11–15
- 2008 – Panvoncito Prison riot
- 2008 – Protests in Serbia – Riots in Belgrade on embassies of countries recognizing the independence of Kosovo by Serbian nationalists.
- 2008 – Political crisis in Lebanon – Riots and engagements between Islamists and progressives.
- 2008 – Tibetan unrest, March 10 – June (Tibet)
- 2007–2008 – Food riots in India, Peru, Morocco, Egypt, Bangladesh, Pakistan, Zimbabwe, Mozambique, Namibia, Uzbekistan, Indonesia, Yemen, Guinea, Cameroon, Burkina Faso, Mauritania and Senegal.
- 2008 – UEFA Cup final riots in Manchester, United Kingdom
- 2008 – South Africa riots – Attacks on foreign nationals
- 2008 – Fishermen riots in Paris – French fishermen clashed with police as they protested over rising fuel costs
- 2008 – Fishermen riots in Brussels
- 2008 – Kamagasaki G8 Riots Osaka, June 2008 Repression and Revolt, General Union
- 2008 – 2008 Guizhou riot in Guizhou, China
- 2008 – Kanmen riot in the coastal province of Zhejiang. According to the Ministry of Public Security, there were 87,000 riots and protests reported in 2005 and this number increases every year.
- 2008 – 2008 riot in Mongolia, following the legislative election
- 2008 – August 2008 Montreal North Riot (Montreal, Quebec, Canada)
- 2008 – Riots throughout Greece after police shot dead a teenager.
- 2008 – 2008 attacks on Christians in southern Karnataka: Riot erupted after Hindu extremist groups Bajrang Dal and Sri Ram Sena attacked and damaged churches in Mangalore and injured people including nuns.
- 2009 – Riots in Oslo, Copenhagen, London, Belfast, Los Angeles, San Francisco, and other cities following the 2008–2009 Israel–Gaza conflict.
- 2009 – Riot on January 13 in Riga, Latvia, after a peaceful demonstration of people, demanding parliament (Saeima) dissolution.
- 2009 – Ubudiah Mosque riots in Kuala Kangsar, Perak, Malaysia.
- 2009 – Rioting in Belfast, Northern Ireland after St Patrick's Day on March 18.
- 2009 – Anti-government Riots, (Bangkok, Thailand). Protesters are demanding the resignation of Prime Minister Abhisit Vejjajiva. hundreds of protesters injured. Thai Army were deployed on the streets of Bangkok and the State of Emergency was declared.
- 2009 – 2009 Iranian election protests
- 2009 – July 2009 Ürümqi riots in Ürümqi, China, July 5–?
- 2009 – Riots in Pakistan's central Punjab, 8 dead.
- 2009 – Riots in Birmingham, United Kingdom, when far-right activists clash with anti-racism protesters and local members of the Muslim and Afro-Caribbean community on August 8, 2009.
- 2009 – Riots in Belfast, Northern Ireland, on August 30.
- 2009 – Arab protesters clashed with Israeli security forces during riots near Temple Mount in Jerusalem, Israel.
- 2009 – Football riot in Široki Brijeg, Bosnia and Herzegovina, 1 dead.

=== 2010s ===
==== 2010 ====
- 2010 – Times Square riots, New York City, NY, United States, 4 rioters shot, 54 arrested.
- 2010 – Prison riot in Venezuela, 8 dead.
- 2010 – Immigrants riots in Rosarno, Italy, 37 injured.
- 2010 – Riots in Nigeria between Muslim and Christian gangs, 992 dead.
- 2010 – Riots in Vancouver, British Columbia, Canada during the 2010 Winter Olympics
- 2010 – 2010 Kyrgyzstani uprising, 85 dead.
- 2010 – Political protests in Thailand, 91 dead.
- 2010 – April 10 – Springfest Riot, Harrisonburg, Virginia, dozens injured; 30–35 arrested.
- 2010 – Riots in Indonesia, 3 dead.
- 2010 – Riots in Kyrgyzstan, 5 dead
- 2010 – Riots in Santa Cruz, California.
- 2010 – Riots in Greece, 3 people killed.
- 2010 – Prison riot in Venezuela, 8 dead.
- 2010 – Riots in northeast India, 3 dead, 70 injured.
- 2010 – Riots in Kyrgyzstan between Kyrgyz and Uzbeks, 2 dead.
- 2010 – Riots in Jamaica, 73 dead.
- 2010 – Riots in Kyrgyzstan, at least 2000 dead.
- 2010 – Prison riot in Mexico, 28 dead.
- 2010 – Riots in Bariloche, Argentina, 2 dead, 12 injured.
- 2010 – Riots in Toronto, Ontario, Canada during the 2010 G-20 Toronto summit, 1105 arrests
- 2010 – Prison riot in Venezuela, 6 dead.
- 2010 – Riots in Indian Kashmir, at least 10 dead.
- 2010 – Riots in Yemen, 2 dead.
- 2010 – Riots in Panama, 1 dead, dozens injured.
- 2010 – Riots in Oakland, California after not-guilty verdict returned in Oscar Grant case.
- 2010 – Riots in Northern Ireland. Police estimate that million in damages were caused, and over 80 police officers injured by nationalist rioters.
- 2010 – Riots in Nigeria, at least 4 killed
- 2010 – Prison riot in Quebec, Canada, 2 killed.
- 2010 – Riots in Indian Kashmir, 50 people killed in seven weeks of clashes with Indian forces.
- 2010 – Riots in Karachi, Pakistan, 90 dead.
- 2010 – Prison riot in Mexico, 14 dead.
- 2010 – Prison riot in Kazakhstan, at least 2 killed, 80 injured.
- 2010 – Farmers riot in Uttar Pradesh, India, at least 2 killed.
- 2010 – Riots in Punjab province, Pakistan, 2 dead.
- 2010 – Riots in Mozambique, 13 killed.
- 2010 – Riots in Indonesia, 6 killed, 22 injured.
- 2010 – Riots in Afghanistan, 2 killed.
- 2010 – Riots in Karachi, Pakistan, 17 dead.
- 2010 – Riots in Ecuador, 3 killed, 50 injured.
- 2010 – Riots in East Kalimantan, Indonesia, 5 dead.
- 2010 – Prison Riots in Venezuela, 16 killed.
- 2010 – Belgrade anti-gay riot, 78 police officers and 17 civilians injured.
- 2010 – Riots in Karachi, Pakistan, at least 33 killed.
- 2010 – Prison riot in Haiti, 3 killed.
- 2010 – Riots in Cross River State, Nigeria, at least 30 killed.
- 2010 – Riots in Western Sahara, 11 dead.
- 2010 – Riot in Maranhão, Brazil, 18 dead.
- 2010 – Student riots in London, 14 injured, 35 arrested, Conservative head office damaged by protestors. Goldsmiths College's UCU (lecturers union) issue statement in support of all demonstrators: "The real violence in this situation relates not to a smashed window but to the destructive impact of the cuts."
- 2010 – Riots in Haiti, 2 dead.
- 2010 – Riots in Cairo, Egypt, 2 dead.
- 2010 – Riots in Rio de Janeiro, Brazil, at least 25 people have been killed.
- 2010 – Riots in Ivory Coast, at least 3 killed.
- 2010 – More student riots in London. Twelve police officers were injured with six requiring hospital treatment. 43 protesters injured, and 26 arrests made. Several buildings were attacked, including the Treasury, the Supreme Court and Topshop. The Prince of Wales and the Duchess of Cornwall car came under attack, smashing the window of the car and covered in paint.
- 2010 – Riots in Buenos Aires, Argentina, at least 3 killed.
- 2010 – Riots in Bangladesh, at least 3 killed and dozens more have been injured.
- 2010 – Ethnic riots in Moscow, Russia, 29 injured.
- 2010 – Riots in Ivory Coast, at least 20 people have been killed.
- 2010 – Riots in the Constitución neighborhood, Buenos Aires, Argentina.
- 2010 – Riots in Tunisia, 1 dead and several people injured.
- 2010 – New park riots – pupils riot in a newly built park, several injured in Glasgow, Scotland

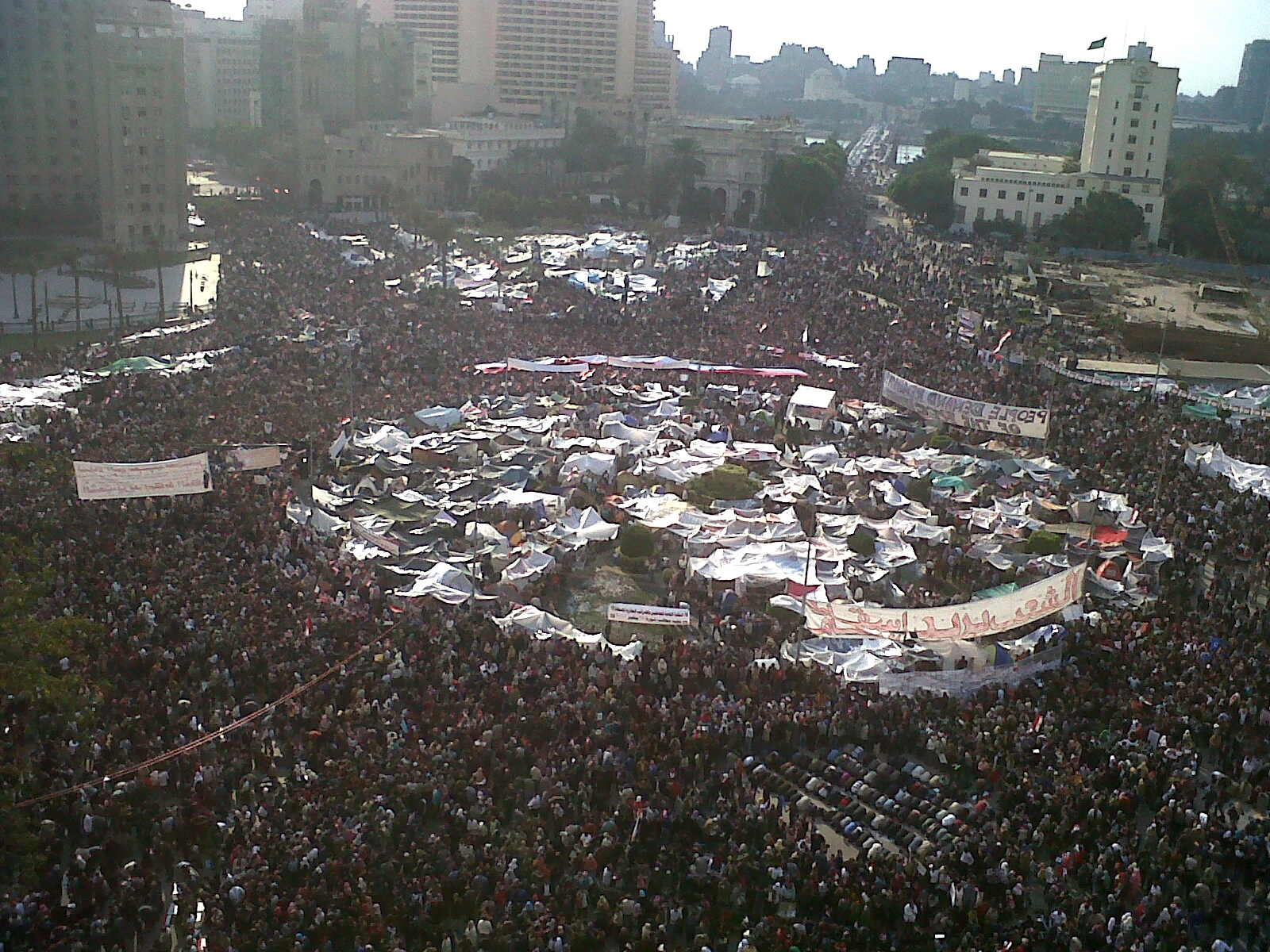
Protesters in Tahrir Square during the Egyptian revolution of 2011

==== 2011 ====
- 2011 – Riots in Assam, Meghalaya, Northeast India, 4 dead.
- 2011 – Riots in Arusha, Tanzania, 2 dead and nine people injured.
- 2011 – Riots in Algeria, 2 dead and four hundred people injured in riots linked to food price increases and unemployment.
- 2011 – Riots in Tunisia, at least 219 killed.
- 2011 – Riots in Jos, Nigeria, more than 30 people dead.
- 2011 – Riots in Tirana, Albania, 3 killed, 17 policemen and soldiers were injured, including three seriously, along with 22 civilians.
- 2011 – Riots in Lebanon, following the fall of Saad Hariri's government.
- 2011 – Riots in Egypt, at least 846 killed.
- 2011 – Riots in Tafawa Balewa, Nigeria, 4 killed.
- 2011 – Prison riot in Sao Luis, Brazil, 6 dead.
- 2011 – Religious riot in Banten, Indonesia, at least 6 killed.
- 2011 – Riots in Manama, Bahrain, at least 70 killed, 92 civilians, 2 security forces injured.
- 2011 – Riots in Sulaimaniya, Iraqi Kurdistan, two killed.
- 2011 – Riots in Al Hoceima, Morocco, 5 killed.
- 2011 – Riots in Libya, at least 24 people killed.
- 2011 – Riots in Iraq, at least 13 killed.
- 2011 – Riots in Yemen, 24 killed.
- 2011 – Riots in Tunis, Tunisia, 3 killed.
- 2011 – Miners riot in Peru, at least 2 killed.
- 2011 – Riots in Cairo, Egypt, between Muslims and Christians, at least 13 people died and 140 were injured.
- 2011 – Riot in Kissidougou, Guinea, at least 3 dead.
- 2011 – Prison riot in Tikrit, Iraq, 2 dead, 14 wounded.
- 2011 – Riots in Syria, at least 60 killed.
- 2011 – Riots in Sanaa, Yemen, 42 people had died and at least 300 were injured according to doctors.
- 2011 – Prison Riot in Hyderabad, Pakistan, 7 dead.
- 2011 – Riot in London, around 250 thousand people, initially a small protest.
- 2011 – Riots in Nigeria, at least 70 people have been killed.
- 2011 – Riots in Mazar-e Sharif and Kandahar, Afghanistan, at least 13 people have been killed.
- 2011 – Riots in Jessore, Bangladesh, 1 dead and at least 30 others injured.
- 2011 – Riots in Cairo, Egypt, 2 killed and at least 15 wounded.
- 2011 – Prison riot in Rumieh prison, Lebanon, 2 dead.
- 2011 – Riot in Parwan province, Afghanistan, 1 killed.
- 2011 – Riots in Uganda, at least 3 killed.
- 2011 – Riots in Yemen, more than 100 people have died in two months of protests.
- 2011 – Riots in Jaitapur, Maharashtra, India, 1 killed, more than 50 injured.
- 2011 – Riots in Diyarbakir, Turkey, 1 killed.
- 2011 – Riots in Dakar, Senegal.
- 2011 – Riots in Tyre, Lebanon, 2 killed.
- 2011 – Riots in Mansa, Luapula Province, Zambia, 3 people were burned to death.
- 2011 – Riots in Nigeria, at least 500 killed in post-election rioting.
- 2011 – Riots in Kampala, Uganda, at least 5 dead and 100 injured.
- 2011 – Riots in Cairo, Egypt, between Muslims and Christians, 12 dead.
- 2011 – Riots in Hesarak District, Nangarhar province, Afghanistan, 1 killed, 3 wounded.
- 2011 – Riots on Israel's borders, at least 12 killed and dozens injured.
- 2011 – Riots in West Bengal, India, at least 8 people killed in post-election violence.
- 2011 – Riots in Taloqan, Takhar province, Afghanistan, at least 12 killed and 80 injured.
- 2011 – Riots in Tbilisi, Georgia, 2 killed, 20 injured.
- 2011 – Riots in Choucha refugee camp, Tunisia, at least 2 killed.
- 2011 – Riots in Sri Lanka, 1 killed, at least 200 wounded.
- 2011 – Riots in Greater Noida, Uttar Pradesh, India, 4 killed.
- 2011 – Riots in Metlaoui, Tunisia, 3 dead and 90 wounded.
- 2011 – Riots in Mogadishu, Somalia, 2 killed.
- 2011 – Riots in El Rodeo I prison, Caracas, Venezuela, 19 killed.
- 2011 – Riots in Vancouver, British Columbia, Canada after the Vancouver Canucks lost to the Boston Bruins in the Stanley Cup.
- 2011 – Riots in Tripoli, Lebanon, at least 4 killed and at least 48 people wounded.
- 2011 – Riots, three separate outbreaks in June and July, Northern Ireland, United Kingdom, over 300 injured.
- 2011 – Riots in Huancavelica, Peru, 3 killed and more than 30 injured.
- 2011 – Riots in Guwahati, Assam, India, 2 killed and at least 30 injured.
- 2011 – Riots in Juliaca, Puno Region, Peru, at least 5 killed and 30 wounded.
- 2011 – Riots in Dadaab, Kenya, 2 killed and 13 injured.
- 2011 – Riots in Karachi, Pakistan, at least 114 killed, including violence a week prior.
- 2011 – Riots in Ganjam, Odisha, India, at least 2 killed.
- 2011 – Riot in Karaganda, Kazakhstan, at least 7 killed in a prison riot.
- 2011 – Riot in Nuevo Laredo, Mexico, 7 killed in a prison riot.
- 2011 – Riot in Hotan, China, 4 killed.
- 2011 – Riots in Homs, Syria, at least 30 killed in sectarian violence.
- 2011 – Riots in Sidi Bouzid, Tunisia, 1 killed.
- 2011 – Riots in Malawi, at least 18 killed.
- 2011 – Riots in Ciudad Juárez, Mexico, 17 people killed in a prison riot.
- 2011 – Riots in Papua, Indonesia, 18 killed in rioting between rival clans.
- 2011 – Riots in Qalad District, Zabul province, Afghanistan, at least 4 killed.
- 2011 – Riots in Pimpri-Chinchwad, India, 3 killed.
- 2011 – Riots in London which spread to other cities in England, over a hundred injured and 5 killed.
- 2011 – Riots in Mogadishu, Somalia, at least 10 killed.
- 2011 – Riots in Chile, scores of demonstrators and police injured, 1 killed.
- 2011 – Riots in Hakkari province, Turkey, 1 killed.
- 2011 – Riots in Jos, Nigeria, at least 22 killed.
- 2011 – Riots in Sbeitla, Tunisia, 4 injured, 1 teenage girl killed.
- 2011 – Riots in Cairo, Egypt, 3 killed and more than 1000 injured in anti-Israel protests.
- 2011 – Riots in Ambon, Indonesia, 5 dead and 80 injured in clashes between Christians and Muslims.
- 2011 – Riots in Paramakudi, Tamil Nadu, India, 7 killed.
- 2011 – Riots in Ujjain, India, 2 killed and 16 injured in a religious riot.
- 2011 – Riots in Bharatpur, Rajasthan, India, at least 9 killed, over a dozen injured.
- 2011 – Riots in Katunitsa, Bulgaria, 2 dead, at least 6 injured in ethnic clashes.
- 2011 – Riots in Dakhla, Western Sahara, Morocco, 7 killed, at least 20 injured.
- 2011 – Riots in Conakry, Guinea, at least 4 killed.
- 2011 – Riots in Cairo, Egypt, at least 24 killed.
- 2011 – Riots in Darrang district, Assam, India, 4 killed.
- 2011 – Riots in Papua, Indonesia, 1 killed, 5 injured.
- 2011 – Riots in Athens, Greece, 1 died of heart attack, 16 injured.
- 2011 – Riots in Monrovia, Liberia, at least 1 killed and several others wounded.
- 2011 – Riots in Nicaragua, at least 4 people killed in post-election violence and 46 officers have been injured.
- 2011 – Riots in Damietta, Egypt, 1 killed and at least 11 injured.
- 2011 – Riots in Cairo, Egypt, 33 killed.
- 2011 – Riots in Kinshasa, Democratic Republic of the Congo, at least 1 dead.
- 2011 – Riots in Karachi, Pakistan, at least 2 killed and 8 injured.
- 2011 – Riots in Zakho, Iraq, at least 30 injured.
- 2011 – Riots in Canete, Peru, at least 1 killed and 20 injured.
- 2011 – Riot in Jagatsinghpur district, Odisha, India, at least 1 killed and 2 injured.
- 2011 – Riots in Kinshasa, Democratic Republic of the Congo, 6 killed.
- 2011 – Riots in Zhanaozen, Kazakhstan, at least 11 people killed and 86 injured.
- 2011 – Riots in Cairo, Egypt, at least 13 people killed and hundreds injured.
- 2011 – Riots in Bima, West Nusa Tenggara, Indonesia, at least 2 people were killed and 8 wounded.
- 2011 – Riots in Rome, at least 100 injured.

==== 2012 ====
- 2012 – Riots in Uri, Indian Kashmir, India, 1 killed and 4 injured.
- 2012 – Riots in Ebonyi State, Nigeria, at least 50 killed.
- 2012 – Riots in Qatif, Saudi Arabia, several killed and 3 injured.
- 2012 – Riots in Bahrain, at least 100 killed and dozens injured within 2011–2012.
- 2012 – Riots in Dakar and Podor, Senegal, 3 killed.
- 2012 – Riots in Bangladesh, 4 killed.
- 2012 – Riots in Port Said, Egypt, at least 74 killed and at least 1000 people injured.
- 2012 – Riots in Cairo and Suez, Egypt, 7 dead.
- 2012 – Riots in Qatif, Saudi Arabia, 1 killed and at least 6 injured.
- 2012 – Riots in Chilaw, Sri Lanka, 1 killed and 4 injured.
- 2012 – Riots in Apodaca, Nuevo León, Mexico, 44 killed in a prison riot.
- 2012 – Riots in Rustenburg, South Africa, 2 killed.
- 2012 – Riots in Afghanistan, 23 killed.
- 2012 – Riots in Songea, Tanzania, 2 killed.
- 2012 – Riots in Aysén, Chile, 1 killed and several injured.
- 2012 – Riots in Macedonia, 2 killed and dozens wounded.
- 2012 – Riots in Puerto Maldonado, Peru, 3 killed and more than 30 injured.
- 2012 – Riots in Turkey, 1 killed.
- 2012 – Riots in Port Said, Egypt, 1 killed and 65 injured.
- 2012 – Riots in Israel, West Bank and Gaza Strip, 1 killed and scores injured.
- 2012 – Riots in San Pedro Sula, Honduras, at least 18 killed.
- 2012 – Riots in Gilgit–Baltistan, Pakistan, at least 17 killed and nearly 50 injured.
- 2012 – Riot in Kuala Lumpur, Malaysia, 25000 protesters fired upon by police using water cannons and tear gas.
- 2012 – Riots in Cairo, Egypt, at least 20 killed.
- 2012 – Riots in Tunis, Tunisia, 1 killed.
- 2012 – Riots in Papua Province, Indonesia, 1 killed and 4 injured.
- 2012 – Riots in Rakhine State, Myanmar, over 80 killed, properties burned down, thousands displaced.
- 2012 – Riots in Kaduna, Nigeria, more than 90 killed.
- 2012 – Riots in Celendín, Peru, at least 3 killed.
- 2012 – Riots in Potosí, Bolivia, 1 killed.
- 2012 – Riots in Qatif, Saudi Arabia, 2 killed.
- 2012 – Riots in Belfast, Northern Ireland.
- 2012 – Riots in Delhi, India, 1 killed and more than 85 injured.
- 2012 – Riots in Linden, Guyana, at least 3 killed.
- 2012 – Riots in Mérida state, Venezuela, at least 22 killed.
- 2012 – Riots in Assam, India, at least 36 killed.
- 2012 – Riots in Anaheim, California, several injuries and 24 arrested.
- 2012 – Riots in Nyala, Sudan, 6 killed.
- 2012 – Riots in Zogota, Guinea, 5 killed.
- 2012 – Riots in Mumbai, India, 2 killed and at least 55 injured.
- 2012 – Riots in North West Province, South Africa, 9 killed.
- 2012 – Riots in North West Province, South Africa, 34 killed, 78 wounded.
- 2012 – Riots in Santa Fe Province, Buenos Aires Province, Tucumán Province, Argentina, 6 killed and 200 injured.
- 2012 – Riots in Belfast, Northern Ireland.
- 2012 – Project X Haren in Haren, Groningen, the Netherlands. Over 30 injured.
- 2012 – Riots in Mexico City caused by the 2012 Mexican general election
- 2012 – Rioting during the Belfast City Hall flag protests in Northern Ireland.
- 2012 – Chinese demonstration and riots during escalation of Senkaku Islands dispute
- 2012 – A long-running series of protests and riots by farm workers in the Western Cape region of South Africa.
- 2012 – Wildcats supporters in Lexington, Kentucky

==== 2013 ====
- 2013 – Riots in Belfast, Northern Ireland during the flag protests. 29 police officers were hurt.
- 2013 – 2013 Bulgarian protests
- 2013 – Riots in Stockholm, Sweden
- 2013 – Riots in Bangladesh
- 2013 – Riots in Turkey (Istanbul) (see Gezi Park protests)
- 2013 – 2013 anti-Sri Lanka protests in Tamil Nadu, India.
- 2013 – Riots in Brazil (São Paulo, Brasília, Rio de Janeiro, Belo Horizonte, Salvador, Recife, Curitiba, Porto Alegre and Vitória)
- 2013 – Riots in Belfast, Northern Ireland following July 12 parade and over several days. Dozens injured mainly Police Officers.
- 2013 – Riots in Shanshan County (Xinjiang, China) 27 people were killed in riots.
- 2013 – Riots in Huntington Beach, California, 1 injured.
- 2013 – Riots in Cape Town, South Africa
- 2013 – Riots in Belfast, Northern Ireland on August 9.
- 2013 – Egyptian anti-coup rioting on August 14, 2013. Over 1000 killed by the Egyptian Security Forces.
- 2013 – Riots in Singapore, 18 injured.
- 2013 – Riots in Trappes, France. After a police patrol stopped a woman for wearing an Islamic face-covering veil (niqab), her husband tried to strangle a police officer and he was arrested. His arrest was followed by three days of rioting by about 200 participants. In the aftermath, three people were convicted to jail sentences from six to ten months.

==== 2014 ====
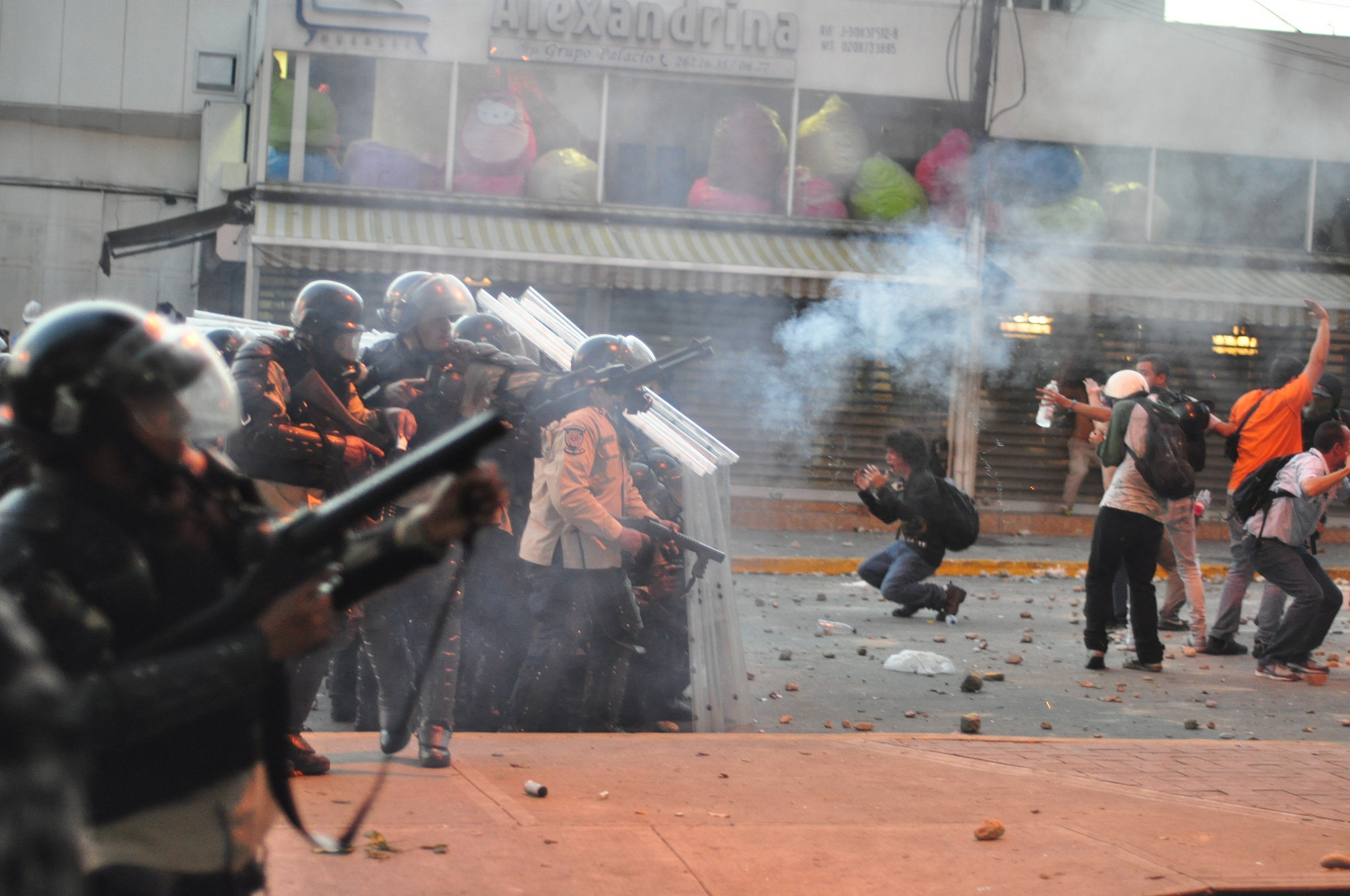
Tear gas being used against opposition protesters in Altamira, Caracas during the 2014 Venezuelan protests

- 2014 – Euromaidan in Ukraine, from November 21, 2013 – February 23, 2014. Protests and riots in Kyiv, Ukraine (106 dead, 1,880 injured, around 1,340 hospitalized, 320 arrested for mass rioting and 125+ police officers injured).
- 2014 – Hrushevskoho Street riots, from January 19, 2014 – February 23, 2014. Kyiv, Ukraine
- 2014 – January 20 Haredi rioted Brooklyn
- 2014 – February–May 2014: 2014 Venezuelan protests, 43 killed, 5000+ injured, 3,689 arrested.
- 2014 – Riots in Mombasa, Kenya after a raid on a mosque conducted by the police.
- 2014 – 2014 Jerusalem unrest.
- 2014 – 2014 unrest in Bosnia and Herzegovina The 2014 unrest in Bosnia and Herzegovina is a series of demonstrations and riots that began in the northern town of Tuzla on February 4, 2014, but quickly spread to multiple cities in Bosnia and Herzegovina, including Sarajevo, Zenica, Mostar.
- 2014 – Zhengzhou Airport riot, February 5–6 in China.
- 2014 – Riots in Tampa, Florida After Cigar City Brewing Company prematurely ran out of beer at their annual release of their highly acclaimed Hunahpu's Imperial Stout, angry attendees began a small riot. Police were called to the scene and dispersed the angry crowd. The riot prompted the brewery's owners to cancel the event in the future. There were no deaths, but some injuries were reported.
- 2014 – Riots in Mexico caused by the 2014 Iguala mass kidnapping
- 2014 – Riots in Ferguson, Missouri caused by the shooting of Michael Brown and charges against the accused officer being dropped.

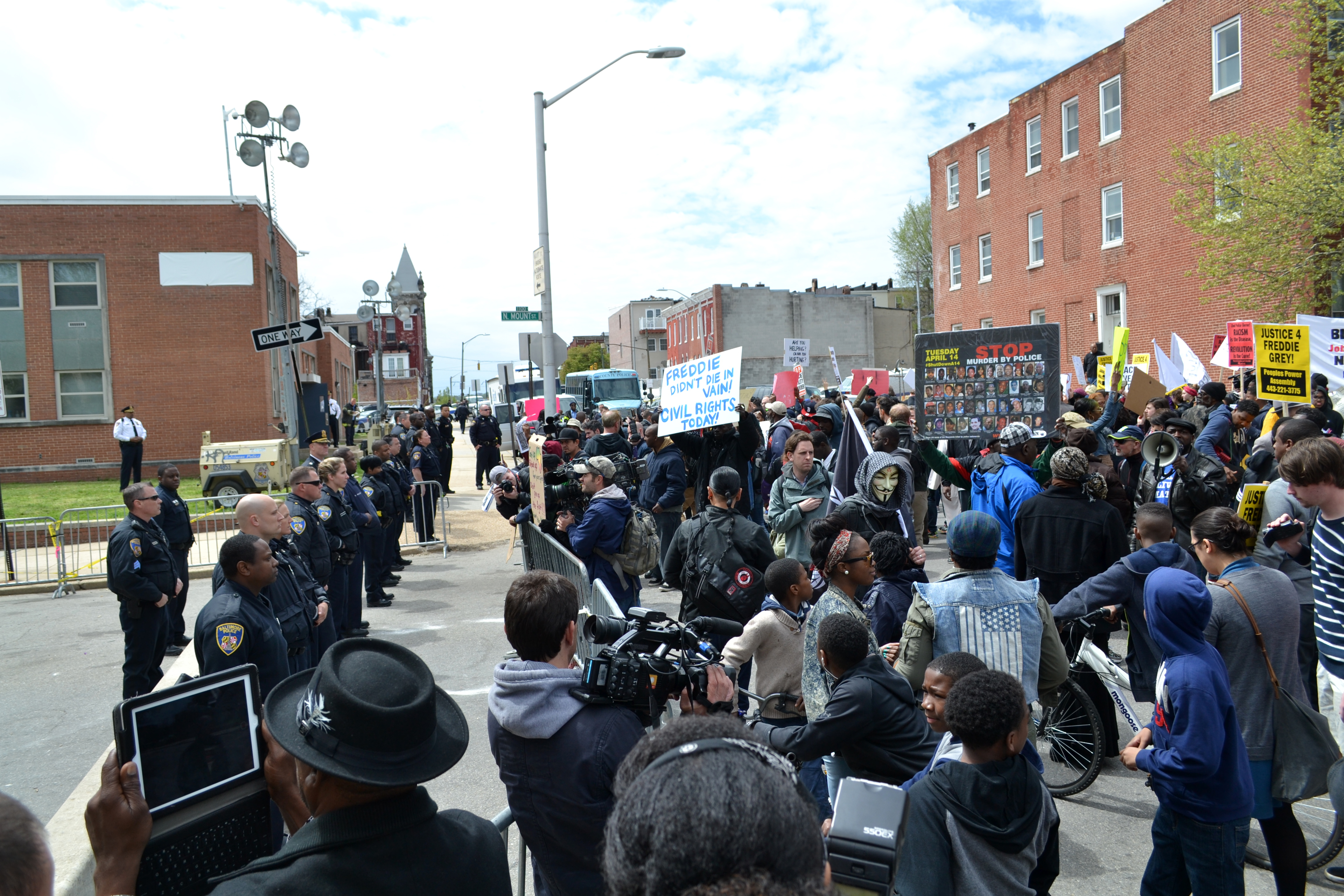
2015 Baltimore protests following the death of Freddie Gray

==== 2015 ====
- 2015 – April 11: 2015 South African xenophobic riots breakout first in Durban then spreading to Johannesburg, South Africa targeting foreign immigrants, 7 dead.
- 2015 – April 26: 2015 Baltimore riots erupted in Baltimore, Maryland, United States in response to the death of 25-year-old Freddie Gray, who died while in police custody.
- 2015 – July: Three days of riots in Belfast, Northern Ireland following the July 12 parade.
- 2015 – September 25: 100 Syrians and Afghans were fighting in a refugee station located in Leipzig, Germany during the Islamic Eid al-Adha festivities. 40 police vehicles were sent to calm the situation.
- 2015 – December: 2015 Corsican protests follow the rise of Corsican nationalism and resulted in the burning of a mosque in Ajaccio and continuing protests.

==== 2016 ====
- 2016 – February: 2016 Mong Kok civil unrest (Mong Kok, Hong Kong)
- 2016 – February 27: Riots after the shooting of Abdi Mohamed in Salt Lake City, Utah, United States
- 2016 – March 13: Riot in Melbourne, Australia central business district: largely gang-related gunshots were reported in the night.
- 2016 – May–June: A series of violent riots Melbourne, Australia between pro and anti-Islam protesters results in numerous acts of vandalism, injuries and arrests.
- 2016 – June 2: San Jose, California, Trump rally turns violent when protesters attacked supporters and one Police Officer was assaulted
- 2016 – June 10–19: UEFA Euro 2016 riots throughout France.
- 2016 – June 20–23: Riots in Tshwane, South Africa preceding national municipal elections. 5 dead and 54 arrested.
- 2016 – August: 2016 Milwaukee riots
- 2016 – August 30: Riots break out in Kalgoorlie, Australia after the Death of Elijah Doughty. 12 police officers injured and buildings and cars damaged.
- 2016 – September: Kaveri River water dispute, India
- 2016 – September: Riots in Charlotte, North Carolina caused by the shooting of Keith Lamont Scott by a police officer.
- 2016 Portland, Oregon riots and 2016 Oakland riots against the election of Donald Trump.

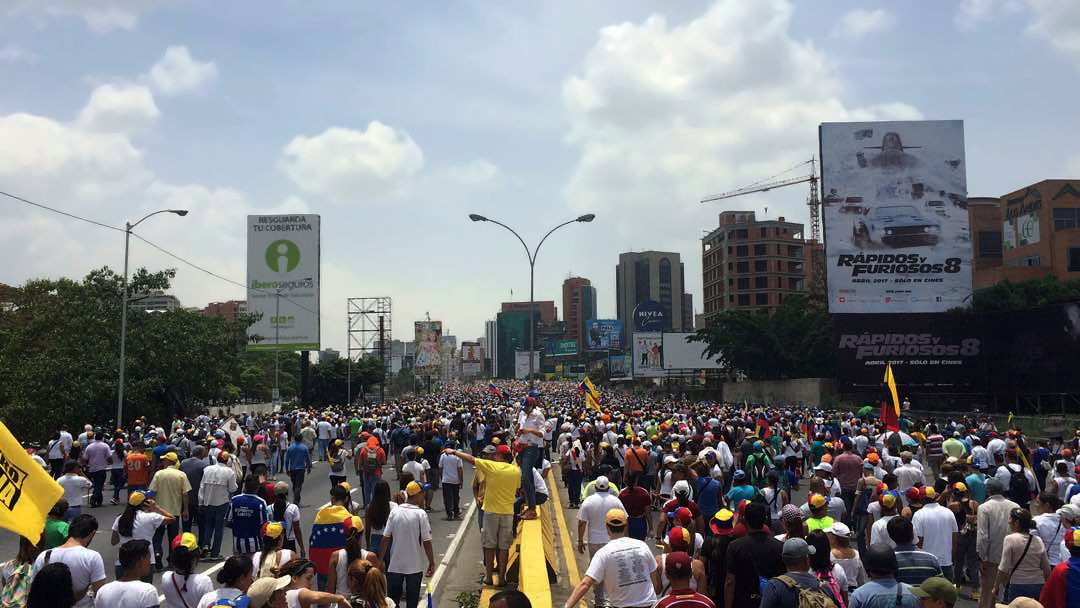
Millions protesting during the Mother of All Marches, part of the 2017 Venezuelan protests

==== 2017 ====
- 2017 – January 1–2: Riots in Ełk, Poland after the murder of 21-year-old Polish man by a Tunisian cook.
- 2017 – January 20: Sporadic rioting by anarchists in Washington, D.C. during the Inauguration of Donald Trump, leading to 234 arrests for rioting, and 6 officers needing medical attention.
- 2017 – January 1–24: 2017 Brazil prison riots.
- 2017 – February 20: Rinkeby riots in Sweden.
- 2017 – February 27 – March 2: Dhaka, Bangladesh, Transport Workers Riots. Transport workers paralyze the city in protest against a court verdict of a fellow worker, clashing with police, causing arson attack, torching of vehicles and other violence. Most violence were reported at the Gabtoli Intersection. One worker was killed after police forced to open fire.
- 2017 – February 4–15 and March 27–28: 2017 French riots
- 2017 – March 31, 2017 – August 12, 2017: 2017 Venezuelan protests, 165 killed, 15000+ injured, 4848 arrested.
- 2017– July 7–8: G20 Hamburg summit riots, Germany
- 2017 – August 7: Rioting in Belfast, Northern Ireland.
- 2017 – August 11–12: Unite the Right rally in Charlottesville, Virginia, following the various movements and actions to remove Confederate monuments. Participants included white supremacists, neo-fascists (including Neo-Nazis), right-wing militias, and figures associated with the Ku Klux Klan. 3 deaths, 33 injuries, 11 arrests.
- 2017 – August 25–26: 2017 Northern India riots, following the rape conviction of Gurmeet Ram Rahim Singh, the leader of the cult Dera Sacha Sauda. 40+ people killed in violence by his followers.
- 2017 – November 19: 50 people were fighting outside a discothèque in Cologne, Germany. 18 police vehicles came to stop the fighting. Several people were lightly wounded among whom were a police officer and one person was seriously wounded.
- 2017 – 11 November 2017 riots in Brussels: After the team of Morocco qualified for the 2018 FIFA World Cup with a 2–0 victory over Ivory Coast, the celebrations by the Moroccan community in Brussels turned into a riot with cars burnt and shops looted by some 300 rioters and 20 police officers injured. Firefighters sent to put out the fires were also attacked by the rioters.
- 2017 – November 29 – December 10: Tegucigalpa, Honduras After a close election between Salvador Nasralla and Juan Orlando Hernandez the electoral body in Honduras still had no results days after the election, so protests against the government occurred, because the government was having reelection even though it is unconstitutional, at the beginning the opposition candidate Salvador Nasralla was winning by 5% but the system fell and 3 days after the reelecting president Juan Orlando Hernandez started to win, this led to protests all over the country which were repressed by the police that up to today are still occurring, until now there has been 34 deaths, between the riots the government declared curfew between 6 PM and 6 AM.

==== 2018 ====
- 2018 – February 1: Calais Migrant Riot: Violence between two groups of migrants, 100 Eritreans and 30 Afghans in Calais, France.
- 2018 – April 2: Rioting in Derry, Northern Ireland, following an illegal republican march.
- 2018 – May 1: Riots broke out in Paris, France when black bloc rioters damaged local businesses, a Genki Sushi restaurant and set fire to cars and a bulldozer.
- 2018 – May 8–10: Prison riot in Depok, Indonesia.
- 2018 – June 25: Riots in Nigeria between Muslim herders and Christian farmers. Total 86 dead.
- 2018 – October 21: Violence between Christian and Muslim youths in Kaduna in Nigeria. Total 55 dead.
- 2018 – October 23: Garments Workers Riots in Narayanganj, Bangladesh. 5 hour clash between agitated rioting garments workers and the police force, 35 injured, 9 vehicles vandalized including a lorry set on fire.
- 2018 – November 26–27: A two-day riot broke out at USJ25, Subang Jaya, Malaysia, between two groups involving more than 10,000 people mostly Indian regarding the relocation of Seafield Sri Maha Mariamman Temple. Malay people were also involved by doing an ambush and a demonstration causing racial misunderstanding. A team of 700 policemen including the Federal Reserve Unit were deployed to Subang Jaya to control the situation. An evacuation of a hotel had been done. 106 people had been arrested. Some injuries were recorded. The developer premises had been vandalized by a group of rioters. Twenty-three vehicles had been set on fire, and a police MPV and a fire engine had been damaged by the rioters. A firefighter was heavily beaten by the rioters and was later warded in the intensive care unit. The victim died on December 17, 2018.
- 2018 – since November: Yellow vests protests, France, sometimes developing into major riots

==== 2019 ====
- 2019 – January 1: Four asylum seekers attacked passers-by of whom 12 were injured near the train station in Amberg, Germany. Members of the public fled into a shop and the shop assistant locked the door to stop the rioters from entering.
- 2019 – January 14–17: Zimbabwe fuel protests erupt into national riots after a dramatic increase the price of fuel by the government, at least 12 deaths and over 600 people arrested.
- 2019 – February 12: Riots in Haiti, 4 killed.
- 2019 – February 23: A large street brawl involving 50 individuals took place in Upplands Väsby, Sweden Masked youth threw rocks at police and three were arrested for rioting (Swedish: våldsamt upplopp).
- 2019 – March 15–October 28: 2019–20 Hong Kong protests
- 2019 – April 8–11: Riots in Sudan.
- 2019 – April 20, riots in Northern Ireland
- 2019 – April 15, riots broke out in Nørrebro in Copenhagen, Denmark, after Islam critic Rasmus Paludan staged a demonstration in the district. 23 people were arrested for a range of offences, from refusal to obey commands issued by police, arson and violence against police. Emergency services responded to 70 fires connected to the disturbances in Nørrebro, Nordvest, Christianshavn og Amager. About 200 people took part.
- 2019 – 20 May: Riots in Oldham, Greater Manchester, United Kingdom; Violent clashes between anti-Islamic demonstrators and counter demonstrators.
- 2019 – 22 May: Riots in Jakarta, Indonesia; Peaceful protest from election results turned violent overnight.
- 2019 – June 2, Deggendorf, Germany: asylum seekers attacked police at the refugee centre. Five police were wounded and six Nigerian nationals were arrested for disturbing the peace and causing bodily harm.
- 2019 – June 3–5: Khartoum massacre in Sudan. 128 dead, over 650 injured.
- 2019 – June 13: Riots in Memphis, in the US following the fatal shooting of Brandon Webber by the police.
- 2019 – July 12: Paris and Marseille, France: after Algeria defeated Ivory Coast in the African football championships, riots broke out in Paris and Marseille. Supporters of the Algerian national team gathered on the Champs-Élysées in Paris. The celebration in Paris turned into unrest where two shops were looted. Police used tear gas in Paris and Marseille to disperse the crowds.
- 2019 – July 26–30: Prison riots in Northern Brazil, at least 112 dead.
- 2019 – August 23: Left-wing protests against the 45th G7 summit in the French town of Biarritz degenerated into riots when participants started throwing rocks at police. Police responded with tear gas and water cannons. The rioters yelled "everybody hates the police" and "anti anti anti capitalists".
- 2019 – August 19–September 23: Riots in Papua, Indonesia. Over 30 people dead.
- 2019 – August 30–September 1: Riots in Glasgow, Scotland. Attack on Irish unity march by opposition and subsequent clash of both parties with the riot police.
- 2019 – September 1–8: Xenophobic riots in Johannesburg primarily targeting African immigrants, sparked by the death of a taxi driver. At least 12 dead and over 680 arrested.
- 2019 – September 23–October 28: Student protest in Jakarta, Indonesia turned into riots, spread nationwide. One student dead.
- 2019 – October 1–Ongoing: Anti-Government riots in Iraq, at least 93 killed, over 1000 injured.
- 2019 – October 3–14: Riots in Ecuador, mass protests with protesters throwing bricks, causing arson attacks and clashing with riot police, the riots were said to be caused by fuel price hike. A State Of Emergency was issued. 8 people were killed during the course of the riots.
- 2019 – October 18–Present: Mass protests with nationwide reach in Chile caused by public transport fares increasing. A State of Emergency was issued.
- 2019 – October 20–22: Riots in Borhanuddin, Bangladesh due to an allegedly offensive Facebook post sent by a hacker. 4 dead.
- 2019 – November 16–18: 8 killed, dozens injured in political riots in Bolivia
- 2019 – November 25: Brawl between hundreds of knife yielding youths turned into violent riots a movie theater in Birmingham, United Kingdom. Tasers were used to stop rioters, 4 rioters were arrested and 7 policemen were injured.
- 2019 – December 20–26: Prison riots in Honduras, 37 killed.

=== 2020s ===
==== 2020 ====
- 2020 – January 13–present: Riots against the ratification of the omnibus law on the Job Creation Law were still happening in various regions in Indonesia, until Thursday (8/10/2020). Many of the actions carried out by workers and students ended in chaos. Some burned tires, damaged police cars, and knocked down government office gates.
- 2020 – February–Ongoing: Riots in Thailand demanded the resignation of Prime Minister Prayuth Chan-ocha and the right to rule King Maha Vajiralongkorn.
- 2020 – February 3–5: Riots in Lesbos, Greece, violent clashes between Afghan migrants and the Greek Police. Overcrowded refugee camps have been blamed for triggering the riots.
- 2020 – February 23-March 1: North East Delhi riots in India, 53 killed.
- 2020 – March 9: In the town of Novi Sanzhary in Ukraine, people started rioting due to the fear that the COVID-19 pandemic was going to kill the population.
- 2020 – March 10: About 50 inmates escaped from Italian prisons as the coronavirus triggered riots and brought the country's criminal-justice system to a halt.
- 2020 – March 11: Ohio: Riot breaks out following a university's announcement of a temporary closure due to COVID-19.
- 2020 – March 13: In Italy, riots erupted in almost 50 prisons this month, leaving 13 inmates dead and 59 guards injured. Authorities said the inmates died of drug overdoses after raiding a prison infirmary.
- 2020 – March 18: Riots rock overcrowded Lebanon prisons over coronavirus fears.
- 2020 – March 21: In Israel, riots erupts after police limit entrance to Temple Mount.
- 2020 – March 23: Prison riots in Colombia following COVID-19 panic. 23 killed.
- 2020 – March 25: Prison riots break out across Argentina sparked by anger over conditions and coronavirus fears.
- 2020 – March 25: A migrant-detention facility in the southern Mexican state of Chiapas experienced a series of riots committed by hundreds of foreign nationals.
- 2020 – March 26: Prisoners Riot in Luxembourg Amid Restrictions on Visitors. Luxembourg's main prison erupted in violence overnight after about 25 inmates started rioting, forcing several police units to intervene.
- 2020 – April 11: Prison riot in Siberia, Russia, prison set ablaze.
- 2020 – April 12: Prison riot in Manado, Indonesia.
- 2020 – May 24 – Ongoing: Riots in Belarus broke out after Lukashenko claimed a landslide victory in Sunday's presidential election, the results of which were criticized amid allegations of fraud.
- 2020 – May 26, 2020 – May 26, 2021: Nationwide riots in the United States, after the police killing of an unarmed black man in Minneapolis, George Floyd, during arrest by a police officer placing his knee on the victim's neck. Protesters and the police clashed for several days, leaving at least 30 dead in or near riot or protest zones. Numerous incidents of property destruction and arson attacks took place during the rioting.
- 2020 – June 7: Black Lives Matter demonstration developed into a riot in Gothenburg. 36 people were charged with crimes included rioting, sabotage and assaulting police officers.
- 2020 – June 11–17: 2020 Dijon riots
- 2020 – June 20–21: 2020 Stuttgart riot, where hundreds of people fought police and looted shops in Stuttgart after police investigated a 17-year-old for narcotics, Germany after police investigated an incident involving drugs. A dozen police were injured.
- 2020 – 29 July 4: Riots in Ethiopia over the death of a musician, 81 people killed.
- 2020 – July 7: The crowd was annoyed by President Aleksandar Vučić's announcement to impose a weekend curfew to eradicate the COVID-19 pandemic that led to riots in Serbia.
- 2020 – July 24: Riots in Satbayev, Kazakhstan, violent mob tried to lynch a man who was suspected of raping a 5-year-old girl resulted in homes and police cars being damaged, police injured and 4 arrests.
- 2020 – August 4 – September 16, 2021: Riots in Beirut, Lebanon following the 2020 Beirut explosions.
- 2020 – August 12: Riots in Bangalore, India, 3 rioters killed in police firing.
- 2020 – August 23–September 1: Riots in Kenosha Wisconsin, Sparked by the police shooting of Jacob Blake.
- 2020 – August 23–October 16: Riots in Libya.
- 2020 – August 29: Riots in Malmö, Sweden: about 300 people rioted in the Rosengård of Malmö. The unrest broke out at 1900 in the evening after activists from the Danish Hard Line party had burned a Quran during the afternoon and posted a film of their manifestation on social media. Swedish authorities had earlier denied Hard Line party leader Rasmus Paludan a permit to hold a demonstration featuring the burning of the Quran and he was stopped at the border. The rioters set fire to property and attacked police officers and police vehicle with rocks while chanting antisemitic slogans.
- 2020 – September 25: DR Congo jail riots, mass rape of at least 25 women committed by rioting inmates who broke free from the jail, while around 20 people died of the initiated violence before the situation was brought under control.
- 2020 – October 25: Riots in Nigeria, at least 12 people killed.
- 2020 – October 26–November 4: Riots in Philadelphia, Pennsylvania sparked by the police shooting of Walter Wallace Jr.
- 2020 – October 29: Prison riots in Herat, Afghanistan, 8 inmates killed during the violence.
- 2020 – December 7–9: Riots in Indonesia by followers of Islamist religious leader Rizieq Shihab. Six rioters killed in police firing.

==== 2021 ====
- January 6: Supporters of President Donald Trump attacked the United States Capitol in Washington, D.C., in an attempt to overturn the results of the 2020 presidential election. 4 rioters were killed.
- January 13: On Wednesday 13 January a protest condemning the death of African 23-year-old Ibrahim B during a police arrest the preceding Saturday turned into rioting and a police station in the Schaerbeek area of Brussels was set afire. The motorcade of king Philippe of Belgium was briefly caught in the incident.
- January 23–26: 2021 Dutch curfew riots. After the introduction of a curfew in reaction to the COVID-19 pandemic in the Netherlands, riots broke out in several cities and towns throughout the Netherlands around the time (21:00) the curfew went into effect for multiple days in a row. Large scale protests were organized under the name "Let's have a coffee together", but turned violent after police were ordered to clear the unlicensed demonstrations. Repair costs are estimated to have run into hundreds of thousands of euros.
- February 2 – Ongoing: 2021 Myanmar Anti-Coup Protests, over 700 protesters killed by the Myanmar Army as of 11 May 2021. Protests and violent crackdown on protesters are still ongoing.
- February 25: Prison riots in Haiti during a jail break led by gang leader Arnel Joseph, at least 25 killed.
- March 19–29: 2021 Bangladesh anti-Modi protests, 17 dead, around 500 injured.
- March 21–29: Riots in Bristol, England, at least 25 arrested.
- March 31 – April 9: Riots in Northern Ireland are caused by tensions relating to a post-Brexit arrangement introducing a sea border. Hostilities further escalated by the refusal of the Public Prosecution Service for Northern Ireland to prosecute a Sinn Féin member for attending an illegal funeral.
- April 12: Riots in Montreal in Canada due to COVID-19 curfews imposed by the Quebec government, damage occurred in Old Montreal
- April 13: Riots in North Portland in the US, arson attack at PPA, one arrest.
- April 17: Coal power plant workers riot in Chittagong, Bangladesh, 5 workers killed, 15 injured in police firing.
- April 23: Riots in Jerusalem, Israel, at least 32 injured.
- April 24–25: Anti COVID-19 lockdown riots in London, 5 arrested.
- May 8–10: Anti COVID-19 lockdown riots in Alberta, Canada, some of the protesters arrested.
- May 21: Riots between Jews and Arabs at al-Aqsa mosque in Israel following the ceasefire to the 2021 Israel–Palestine crisis, 15 injured.
- June 4–5: Solhan and Tadaryat massacres, in Burkina Faso, at least 160 killed.
- June 18–19: Rioting and violent clashes between Proud Boys and Antifa members in Oregon City, Oregon, US, over opposing views.
- July 9–18: July 2021 South African Riots, 337 dead, over 3000 arrested.
- July 15, 2021 – September 15, 2022: 2021–2022 Iranian protests
- July 24–25: Anti-COVID lockdown riots occur throughout Australia, most prominently in Sydney, resulting in injuries and many arrests.
- August 15: Riots outside the Los Angeles City Hall, one person stabbed.
- August 15–19: Riots in Meghalaya, India. Violent clashes were reported in the region.
- August 21: Anti-COVID lockdown riots occur again throughout Australia, most prominently in Melbourne, but also in Sydney, Brisbane, and Perth; resulting in injuries to both rioters and police officers and many arrests.
- September 29–30: Two days of prison riots in Ecuador, at least 116 prisoners killed, some reportedly beheaded.
- October 3–9: Lakhimpur Kheri massacre and subsequent riotings in India. Riots begun after an Ashish Mishra, the son of Union Minister of State Ajay Mishra Teni drove a truck over protesting Farmers killing eight (8) of them, resulting in violent clashes erupting in the region for seven days.The riots ended after Ashish Mishra was arrested on October 9 late evening.
- October 21–31: Ten day violent rioting in Pakistan, at least seven police officers and four demonstrators were killed and many injured on both sides during the rioting initiated by the outlawed far-right Tehreek-e-Labbaik Pakistan (TLP) party, that ended after the Pakistan government reached an agreement with them on October 31.
- November 19: Police fired tear gas to quell an anti-government protest against deteriorating economic conditions and rising cost of living in Malawi. Hundreds of people poured onto the streets of the southern commercial hub of Blantyre, calling on President Lazarus Chakwera's administration to take immediate steps to rein in soaring prices and unemployment. The protesters set tires on fire and blocked roads to bring traffic to a halt in parts of the city, and also torched a police post in Blantyre's central business district.
- November 19–21: Anti-lockdown riots in The Netherlands, most noticeably in Rotterdam, which started off as protests against the new COVID-19 restrictions. Multiple rioters and police were injured including 4 rioters shot by police. 173 have been arrested
- November 24: During the 2021 Solomon Islands unrest, Police in Solomon Islands have used tear gas and rubber bullets to disperse hundreds of protesters, who allegedly burned down a building in the parliament precinct, a police station and a store in the nation's capital of Honiara, amid reports of looting. The protesters marched on the parliamentary precinct in the east of Honiara, where they allegedly set fire to a leaf hut next to Parliament House. The protesters were demanding the prime minister, Manasseh Sogavare step down. Many of the protesters come from Malaita province, the most populous province in the country whose provincial government has had tense relations with the central government for years. The tensions between the provincial and national government intensified in 2019 when Sogavare announced that Solomon Islands would switch its diplomatic allegiance from Taiwan to China, to the chagrin of Malaita premier Daniel Suidani.
- December 25–29: Riots in Kerala, India, clashes between migrant workers started during Christmas evening, who also attacked the police and set police van on fire around 160 migrant workers connected to the violence arrested. The mass arrest drive ended on the early morning of December 28, while police patrolling continued till December 29 and the situation was finally brought under control.

==== 2022 ====
- January 2–11: 2022 Kazakh unrest which include rioting and other acts of vandalism and numerous deaths.
- March 9–November 14: 2022 Sri Lankan protests, violent protests, including rioting due to Sri Lankan economic collapse.
- March 9– April 10: 2022 Corsica unrest.
- April 19: Riots in New Market, Dhaka, Bangladesh leave 1 dead, 50 injured.
- July 27–31: Iraq parliament protest and siege, Protesters besiege the Iraqi parliament in support of Iraqi Shia leader Muqtada al-Sadr, over 100 injured.
- August 27–28: Violent clashes in Tripoli, lead to at least 32 deaths.
- August 28-September 19: the 2022 Leicester unrest, a series of riots and street fights between members of the Hindu and Muslim communities.
- September 16: Anti-monarchy protests against King Charles III of the United Kingdom turned into violent rioting forcing police to crackdown on the protesters and calming the situation.
- September 16–2023: Mahsa Amini protests in Iran.
- October 1–2: Two day rioting in Indonesia following a football match. 129 killed.
- October 19–24: Ethnic clashes lead to violent rioting in Sudan, at least 220 killed.
- October 20–26: Riots in Chad lead to at least 60 deaths.
- October 25: More than 30 people killed in tribal fighting in Papua New Guinea.
- November 12: Riots in Southeast Maluku killed two people and injured dozens more.
- November 27–29: Three day rioting in Belgium, following their 2-0 2022 FIFA World Cup defeat to Morocco. On November 29 the situation calmed after the mayor of Brussels increased police presence.
- December 6–7: Minor rioting across Spain, following Spain's 3–0 2022 FIFA World Cup defeat on penalties to Morocco.
- December 11–12: Violent clashes between the Taliban and Pakistan forces lead to 8 deaths.
- December 13–14: The killing of a teenager by the police in Greece triggers massive rioting in Athens on December 13. After a massive arrest drive by the police on December 14 the situation was brought under control.
- December 14–15: Riots in French cities such as Montpellier and Paris after Morocco's 2–0 2022 FIFA World Cup defeat to France. There were also clashes between French and Moroccan fans which resulted in the death of a 14-year-old boy.
- December 24–26: Kurds riot in Paris after the 2022 Paris shooting.

==== 2023 ====
- January 21: 2023 Atlanta anti-police riot, protest turned violent, attacking businesses and burning an Atlanta Police Department vehicle.
- February 23: 2023 Wamena riot: 12 people were killed when a crowd of Papuans was angered by rumors of a child being kidnapped.
- March 1–22: Tempi train crash protests
- March 16–19: 2023 Paris riots
- April 5: 2023 Al-Aqsa clashes, rioting by Palestinians and clashes between Palestinians and Israeli police. 14 injured.
- May 3–Ongoing: 2023 Manipur violence in India, over 70 people killed during the violent ethnic rioting as of May 17, 2023.
- March 14–May 12: Riots in Pakistan at least 47 killed, over 5000 arrested.
- June 20: Támara prison riot, at least 41 killed.
- June 27-July 15: Nahel M. riots in France, after the death of a 17-year-old boy by a police officer.
- July 31-August 8: 2023 Haryana riots in India, after an organized Muslim mob attacked a Hindu religious procession for allegedly including cow vigilante Monu Manesar. However the attendance of Monu Manesar in the procession was later proven to be a false rumor to initiate the violence.
- August 4: 2023 Union Square riot ensues after Twitch streamer Kai Cenat holds giveaway at Union Square in New York City.
- August 8–9: 5 people killed in rioting in Cape Town, South Africa.
- August 9: Riots in Greece by Croatian football fans and their subsequent arrest.
- August 21–23: Riots in Derbyshire, England surrounding a Kabaddi event. Knife attacks and gun shots were reported. 3 injured, 4 arrested.
- November 6–7: Two day riots in Los Angeles, US; after altercation while two sides rallied over conflicting opinion regarding the Gaza war, 1 dead.
- November 23–24: Riots in Dublin, Ireland in the evening following the stabbing of several school children in Dublin. 57 arrested.
- December 9: Violent rioting between gang members and villagers in Central Mexico, at least 14 dead.

==== 2024 ====
- January 10–19: Riots in Port Moresby, Papua New Guinea after James Marape's tax deduction announcement. At least 15 dead.
- January 25–February 15: Violence and riots circling the 2024 Pakistani general election leaves over 30 dead.
- February 10–13: 5 dead in violence following the destruction of an allegedly illegal madrasa in Uttarakhand, India.
- February 19: 64 killed in Papua New Guinea tribal rioting.
- March 21: Over 40 killed in violent rioting between farmers and hearders in Chad.
- March 30: Riots in Mexico following the killing of an eight-year-old girl by a woman.
- April 9: Three Tanzanian soldiers were killed in violence in eastern Congo.
- April 14: Pre-poll rioting in Sikkim, India; political candidate's house attacked.
- April 15: Wakeley church riot. Rioting in Wakeley (a western suburb of Sydney), New South Wales, Australia; outside of a church where a bishop was stabbed during a sermon being livestreamed.
- April 30: 23 dead in violent rioting over cattle theft in South Sudan.
- May 13: 2024 New Caledonia unrest
- May 17–22: Violent clashes and attack on Pakistani students by mob in Kyrgyzstan force over 3000 students to flee back to Pakistan. At least four of the students had been killed.
- June 1: Violent clashes related to the Lok Sabha election erupt between TMC and BJP workers in West Bengal, India; several injured.
- June 18–8 August: Kenya Finance Bill protests.
- June 25: Storming of the Kenyan Parliament by protestors. Over 23 people dead and hundreds missing. Few days later bodies discovered dumped allegedly of missing protestors.
- July 18: Harehills riot
- 1 July-5 August: July Revolution in Bangladesh, 1500+ killed.
- 30 July-5 August: Riots across many cities in the United Kingdom by the political right.
- November 7: November 2024 Amsterdam riots, relating to a match between AFC Ajax and Maccabi Tel Aviv amidst the backdrop of the Gaza war.
- November 21–27: Riots between Sunnis and Shias in Pakistan leave over 80 dead.
- December 2: Around 100 killed in riots surrounding a football match in Guinea.
- December 24–25: 21 killed in post-election violent rioting in Mozambique, part of larger 2024–2025 Mozambican protests. The opposition urged for calm on December 25, ending the two day riotings.

==== 2025 ====
- February 6: 80+ killed in violence in Southern Sudan.
- February 8–9: Riots in Gazipur, Bangladesh.
- March 17: Riots in Nagpur, India over the removal of tomb of Mughal emperor Aurangzeb.
- March 9–Ongoing: 2025 Nepalese pro-monarchy protests.
- May 25: May 2025 Paris riots
- June 6+: 2025 Los Angeles anti-ICE riots
- July 14+: Torre-Pacheco unrest in Torre-Pacheco, Spain.
- 16 July: Four people are killed in an attack by the banned Awami League on a convoy carrying leaders of the National Citizen Party that led to rioting in Gopalganj.
- September 8–13: Riots in Kathmandu, Nepal after a ban on social media as well as bringing light to the corruption during KP Sharma Oli's regime. At least 19+ killed, 345+ injured. Curfew imposed to prevent further violence.
- December 28: 2025–2026 Iranian protests (December 28, 2025 – January 2026): Nationwide protests sparked by economic grievances and the collapse of the rial. The unrest spread to over 180 cities, resulting in a severe government crackdown and an internet blackout starting January 8, 2026.

==== 2026 ====
Riot police firing tear gas during clashes at Porte Saint-Martin in Paris, 17 October 2026

- May 19-June 30: Riots in Bangladesh over the 2026 Pallabi Rape and Murder Case.
- June 9–11: 2026 Northern Ireland riots: Anti-Immigration riots in Belfast in response to a stabbing.
- July 26–August 4: Anti-Muslim riots in Nepal. On August 4, 2026 the Nepalese Army finally brought the situation under control.
- October 17 Riots in France in Marseille (city hall storming), Limoges (town hall torched), Lyon (fires in city offices), Bordeaux (police compound). More than 1000 people detained.

== See also ==
=== Prominent riots ===
- 2007–2008 world food price crisis

=== Related lists by topic ===
- Classical music riots
- List of battles
- List of ethnic riots
- List of food riots
- List of race riots
- List of revolutions and rebellions
- List of strikes
- List of timelines
- List of uprisings led by women
- List of wars

=== Related lists by place ===
- List of incidents of civil unrest in Belize
- List of riots and civil unrest in Calgary
- List of riots in London
- Timeline of riots and civil unrest in Omaha, Nebraska
- List of riots in Singapore
- List of incidents of civil unrest in the United States
- List of incidents of civil unrest in France
