= 2005 Australian riots =

2005 Australian Riots may refer to:

- 2005 Cronulla riots
- 2005 Macquarie Fields riots
