= 2006 Aligarh riots =

Violent civilian conflict in Aligarh, India

The 2006 Aligarh riots an outbreak of violent conflict between Muslims and Hindus in Aligarh, India. Aligarh is a majority-Hindu district with a large Muslim minority in the northern Indian state of Uttar Pradesh. It has been the site of large-scale riots in past. On April 5, 2006, riots broke out which lead to the deaths of at least five to six people.

== Causes ==
The exact cause of the riots is disputed. The rioting started on night of 5 April during the Hindu festival of Ram Navami. According to some reports, members of the Muslim community removed the decorations on a Hindu temple, while other reports suggest that riots started after some Muslims objected to the overnight celebration of Ram Navami.

== Timeline ==
- 5–6 April: According to one version of the events, members of Muslim community remove decorations on a Hindu temple in view of Rama Navami leading to communal clashes in Sabzi Mandi (Vegetable Market) and Dahi Wali Galli areas of the city. Four people are killed and 13 are injured. Another, more authoritative report by Reuters suggests that tensions escalated after Muslims objected to overnight celebration of Rama Navami.
- 6 April: Curfew is imposed in certain areas of the city and Rapid Action Force is deployed. State of Uttar Pradesh goes on 'Red Alert' as government fears of rioting spreading to other cities.
- 7 April: Death toll rises to 6, as the city's Superintendent of Police S. K. Verma and Additional District Magistrate Satya Bhan are placed under suspension on charges of laxity. Lalji Tandon, opposition leader of the Uttar Pradesh state assembly, is detained at Kanpur while on his way to riot-affected areas. 68 people are arrested on rioting charges.
- 8 April: Rioting continues despite the curfew and heavy paramilitary presence in the city.

== See also ==
- 1990 Aligarh riots
- 1992 Bombay Riots
- 2002 Gujarat Riots
