= 1996 Trafalgar Square riots =

1996 football riots in London

The 1996 Trafalgar Square riots in London occurred on 26 June 1996. After the England national football team was defeated by Germany in the knockout stage of UEFA Euro 1996 at Wembley Stadium, hooligans took over Trafalgar Square in the West End of London. Up to 2,000 hooligans, many drunk, pelted police and civilians with bottles, smashed windows and shops and overturned cars.

The Metropolitan Police deployed its public order unit in riot gear, and they were confronted by the hooligans. Sixty-six people were injured and over 200 arrests were made.

Amongst the hooligan firms held responsible for the Trafalgar Square riot were Chelsea Headhunters.

The events were a familiar flashback to the large-scale football violence in the country during the 1980s. However, the rioting was the only notable incident that happened during the Euro 1996 championship, which was otherwise peaceful and orderly.

As well as the rioting in London, violence also occurred that day in several other places in the country, including Swindon and Bedford, where looting occurred. In Shirley, West Midlands, hooligans threw bricks at an Aldi (German) supermarket. In Brighton, a Russian student was stabbed five times by a hooligan who thought he was German.

== See also ==
- Poll Tax riots
- 2009 Upton Park riot
