= Pavoncito Prison =

Prison in Guatemala

- Location: Fraijanes, Guatemala

Pavoncito Prison (Spanish: Prisión de Pavoncito) is a prison in Guatemala. It is located in the municipality of Fraijanes south of Guatemala City.

== December 2002 riot ==
In December 2002, 18 prisoners were killed in a two-day riot at the prison.

== November 22, 2008 riot ==
On November 22, 2008, a fight between members of rival gangs left seven inmates dead. Two died from gunshots and five beheaded. The riot lasted five hours before authorities regained control.
