= 1990 Aligarh riots =

Riots in India

The 1990 Aligarh riots were an outbreak of violent conflict between Hindu and Muslim Indians between December 7-10, 1990. It was part of a wave of riots in several major Indian cities that lead to hundreds of deaths in December of 1990. Between 75 and 200 people were killed in Aligarh. Official reports claim that 92 were killed, two-thirds of whom were Muslims. Unrest began after a Hindu-led protest in Ayodhya outside a mosque that was once the site of a Hindu temple.

== Cause of the riot ==
There is a long history of interreligious tension between Muslims and Hindus in India. The country was almost entirely Hindu until the 14th century, when Muslim armies invaded. Approximately 3,000 mosques in India were built on top of Hindu temples, or on sites otherwise sacred to Hindus. Some Hindu nationalists want to demolish these mosques and rebuild temples there.

In September 1990, a coalition of Hindu nationalist parties started a campaign to build a temple on the site of the Babri Masjid, a 16th-century mosque that was built on the site of Ram Janmabhoomi. The mosque had been in dispute since the 19th century, which saw conflicts in and out of court over Hindus or Muslims should rightfully control the site, which was the birthplace of the god Rama. This led to a security crackdown around the site of the mosque, which only angered nationalists further.

On October 30, 1990, 17 kar sevaks (religious volunteers) were shot by police in Ayodhya for attempting to demolish the mosque. Mourners cremated the bodies of those killed and carried their ashes in a procession throughout the state, including to Aligarh, thereby arousing tensions between the communities. There is dispute to the immediate cause of the riots: some claim that Muslims attacked Provincial Armed Constabulary (PAC) soldiers after a rally at a mosque, while others claim that a bomb went off near a mosque and Muslims attacked in retaliation.

== Violence and response ==
The violence peaked on December 8. Around 500 people attacked and derailed a train car. Several passengers, both Muslim and Hindu, were pulled out and killed. The same day, rioters attempted to burn down the home of a Muslim family, killing more than a dozen.

News circulated through the Hindu media about Muslims killing hospital patients added fuel to the conflict. There were also reports by the People's Union for Civil Liberties that PAC was killing Muslim civilians.

A curfew was imposed, but officials struggled to contain the violence. Fighting was sporadic and difficult to for police to keep up with. The police also became a target for incensed rioters, who threw rocks from rooftops. Eventually, the army was called in to enforce order.
