= 2005 Macquarie Fields riots =

Event in south-west Sydney, Australia

The 2005 Macquarie Fields riots were a series of disturbances in south-west Sydney which occurred from 25 February 2005-1 March 2005. The Macquarie Fields riots were referred to as a riot by both the Parliament of New South Wales and the media.

== Trigger event ==
The riots were sparked by a high-speed police pursuit on 25 February through the Glenquarie housing estate in the south-west Sydney suburb of Macquarie Fields. The chase resulted in the driver, 20-year-old Jesse Kelly, crashing the stolen vehicle into a tree and killing his two passengers, 17-year-old Dylan Raywood and 19-year-old Matthew Robertson. Certain circumstances around the riots including the fatal police pursuit in a low-income area were seen to be a repeat of the riots that took place in Redfern, New South Wales during the previous year.

The accident sparked protests and accusations of police impropriety after Kelly's aunt Deborah claimed police had rammed the car prior to the crash. A surveillance tape recorded Deborah fabricating the accusation with Kelly.

Premier of New South Wales Bob Carr mobilised hundreds of police, including heavily armed riot squads into the area. The violence that followed lasted four nights, involving at least 300 residents clashing with police. The rioters hurled rocks, bottles, bricks, petrol bombs, and set cars alight, injuring several officers. During a Parliamentary inquiry nine months later, NSW Police Commissioner Ken Moroney stated that the violence during the incident was not a riot when compared to incidents in Los Angeles or Paris, referring to the distinction between "disturbance" and "riot" as defined by Los Angeles Police Department police chief Bill Bratton, who had been visiting Australia at the time of the disturbances.

== Criticism of response ==
The police were criticised at the time for not acting to quell the disturbances quickly enough, with some arguing the riots could have been ended in their first day had a more aggressive stance been adopted. The so-called 'soft' approach by police was put down to downsizing and a lack of training within the NSW Police Force that inhibited their ability to contain the ringleaders effectively. The police eventually made 55 arrests, including that of Jesse Kelly, who had fled the scene of the fatal car crash which preceded the riots.

== Social issues ==
The suburb of Macquarie Fields suffered from a high unemployment rate of 11.3 per cent, more than twice the National average. Of its 4,600 homes, 1,500 are housing commission projects and home to low-income and disadvantaged families. Criticisms have been made about this controversial cul de sac-style urban planning that left many residents with very little privacy.

== Charges and sentences ==
In October 2006, Jesse Kelly was formally charged after admitting two counts of aggravated dangerous driving occasioning death and was sentenced to 5 years' jail. In the same month a coronial inquiry officially cleared New South Wales Police of any responsibility for the riot. His aunt Deborah Kelly, who started the rumours that sparked the riots, was charged with attempting to pervert the course of justice and with concealing a serious indictable offence.

== See also ==
- List of riots
