= 2013 Stockholm riots =

2013 Stockholm riots may refer to:

- May 2013 Stockholm riots (Husby), between security forces and immigrant youth
- December 2013 Stockholm riots (Kärrtorp), between anti-fascist and neo-Nazi activists
