= Riot =

Violent public disturbance

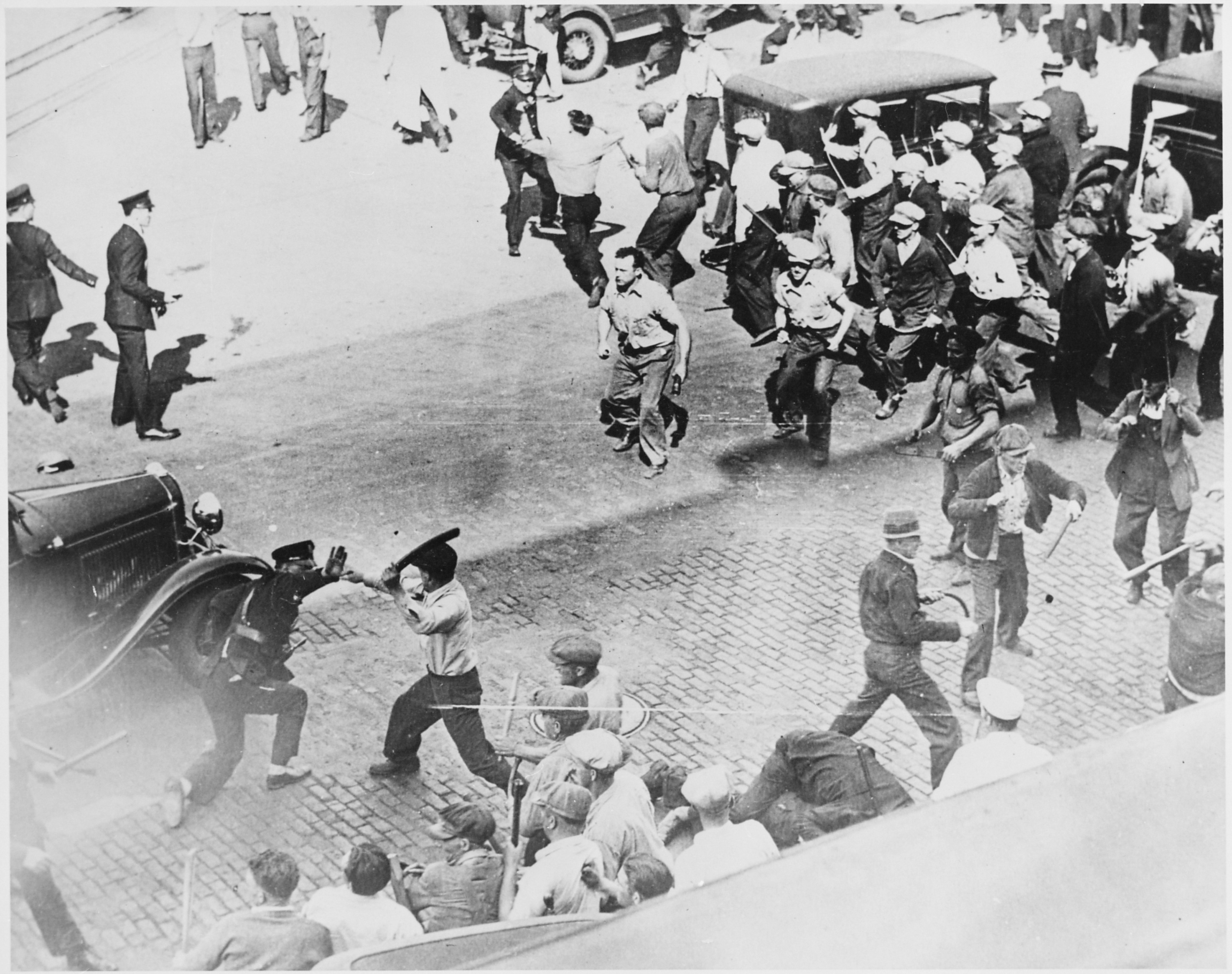
Teamsters, armed with pipes, riot in a clash with police in the Minneapolis Teamsters Strike of 1934 during the Great Depression.

Riot of the French Algerian Front on 11 November 1960, in Algiers, French Algeria

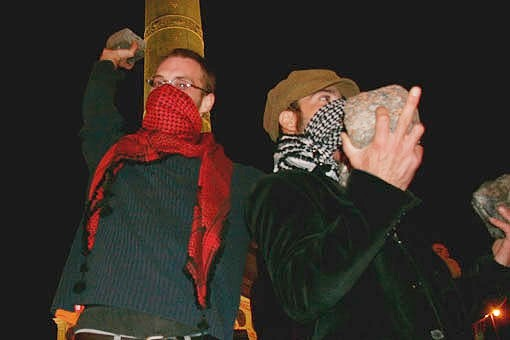
Anti-Sarkozy rioters wearing scarves to conceal their identity and filter tear gas in Paris, France in May 2007

A riot or mob violence is a form of civil disorder commonly characterized by some people committing public violence against government or other authority figures and property. Riots typically involve destruction of property, public or private. The property targeted varies depending on the riot and the inclinations of those involved. Targets can include shops, cars, restaurants, state-owned institutions, and religious buildings or other symbol of a targeted sector of the population. Although a riot may be produced by political grievances, government offices themselves are not often targeted due to their strong protection.

Riots often occur in reaction to a grievance or out of dissent. Historically, riots have occurred due to poverty, unemployment, poor living conditions, governmental oppression, taxation or conscription, conflicts between ethnic groups (race riot) or religions (e.g., sectarian violence, pogrom), the outcome of a sporting event (e.g., sports riot, football hooliganism) or frustration with legal channels through which to air grievances.

Individuals may attempt to lead or control a riot, but riots typically are conducted by disorganized gatherings of people. Mob actions are frequently "chaotic and exhibit herd behavior". A body of evidence suggests that riots do not exhibit irrational, herd-like behavior (sometimes called mob mentality), but actually follow inverted social norms.

Police forces often have difficulty dealing with a riot. They may use tear gas or CS gas to control rioters. Riot police may use less-than-lethal methods of control, such as shotguns that fire flexible baton rounds or rubber bullets to injure or otherwise incapacitate rioters, thus breaking up a riot or allowing easier arrest.

== Classification ==
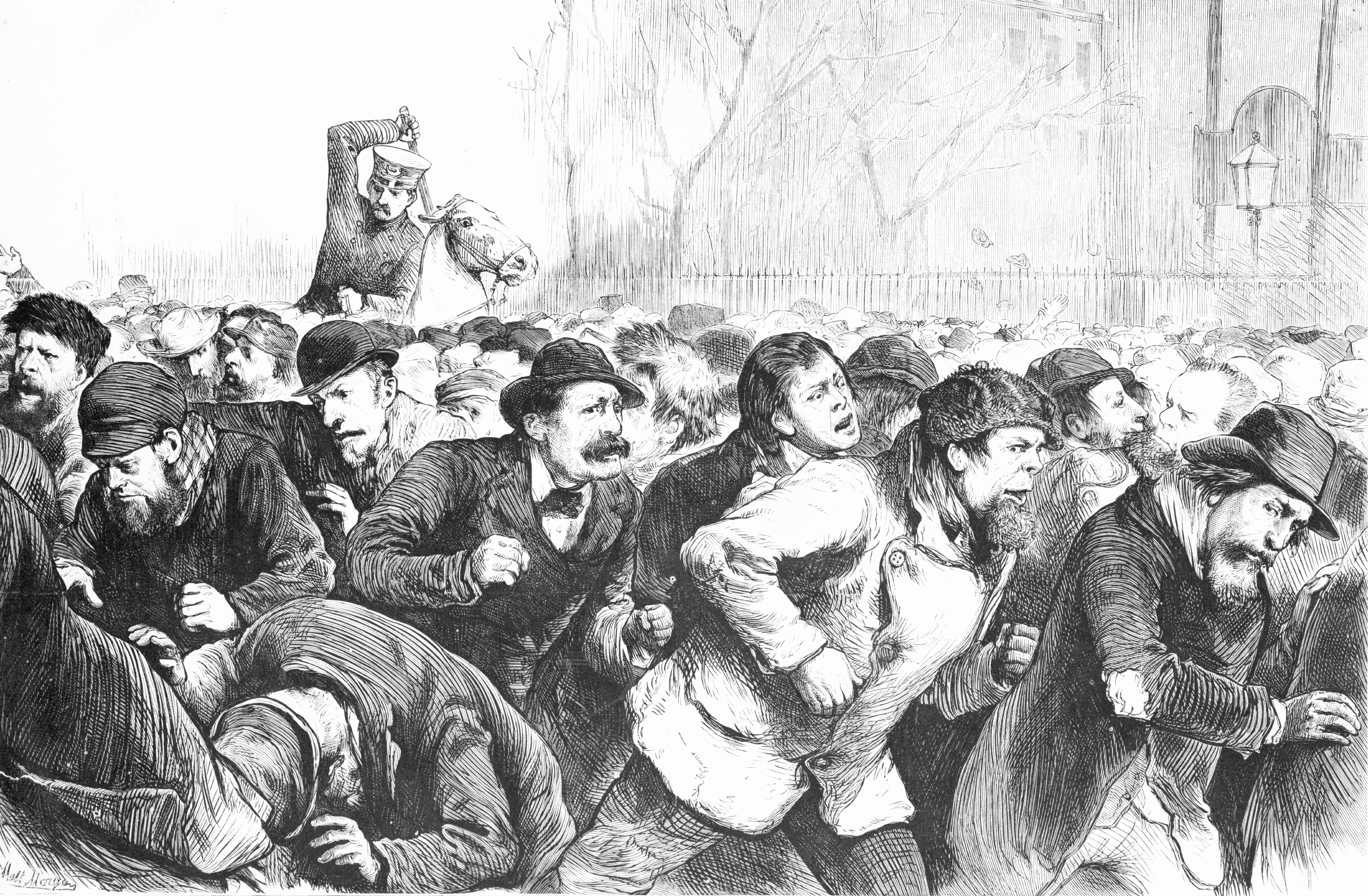
New York police attacking unemployed workers in Tompkins Square Park, 1874.

Food riots may occur due to food shortages caused by harvest failures, incompetent food storage, hoarding, poisoning of food, or attacks by pests like locusts. If members of the public become desperate from such conditions, they may attack shops, farms, homes, or government buildings to loot staple foods like bread, grain or salt. T. S. Ashton, in his study of eighteenth century food riots among colliers, noted that "the turbulence of the colliers is, of course, to be accounted for by something more elementary than politics: it was the instinctive reaction of virility to hunger." Charles Wilson noted, "Spasmodic rises in food prices provoked keelmen on the Tyne to riot in 1709, tin miners to plunder granaries at Falmouth in 1727." In the 1977 Egyptian Bread Riots, hundreds of thousands of people rioted after food subsidies stopped and prices rose.

A police riot is a term for the disproportionate and unlawful use of force by a group of police against a group of civilians. This term is commonly used to describe a police attack on civilians or provoking civilians into violence.

A political riot is a riot for political purposes or that develops out of a political protest.

A prison riot is a large-scale, temporary act of concerted defiance or disorder by a group of prisoners against prison administrators, prison officers, or other groups of prisoners. It is often done to express a grievance, force change or attempt escape.

In a race riot, race or ethnicity is the key factor. The term had entered the English language in the United States by the 1890s. Early use of the term referred to riots that were often a mob action by members of a majority racial group against people of other perceived races.

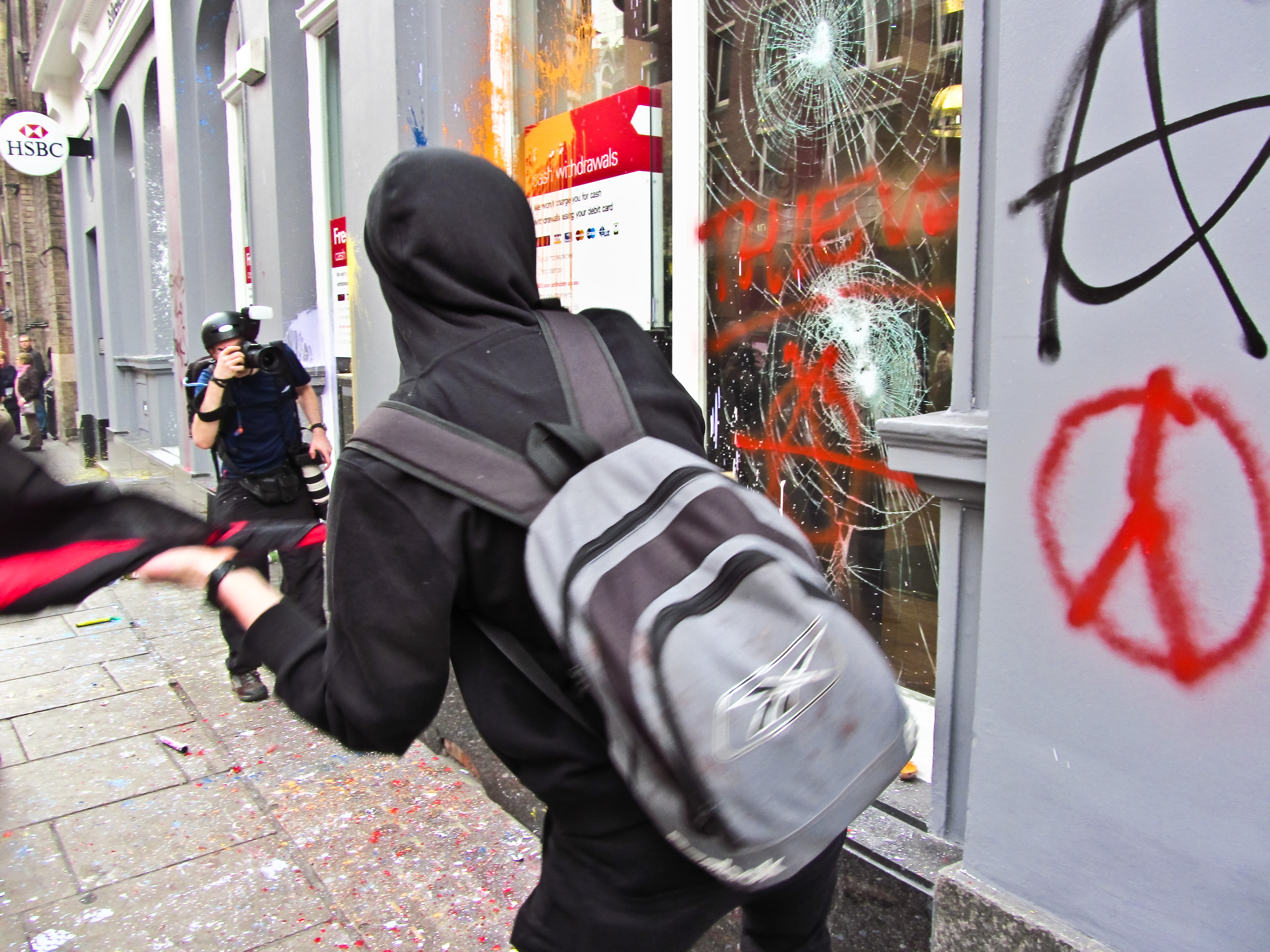
March for Alternative - 25 student anarchist rioters damage storefront windows in protests against the IMF

In a religious riot, the key factor is religion. Historically, these riots could involve groups arguing who possesses the primate of orthodoxy. The rioting mob targets people and properties of a specific religion, or those believed to belong to that religion.

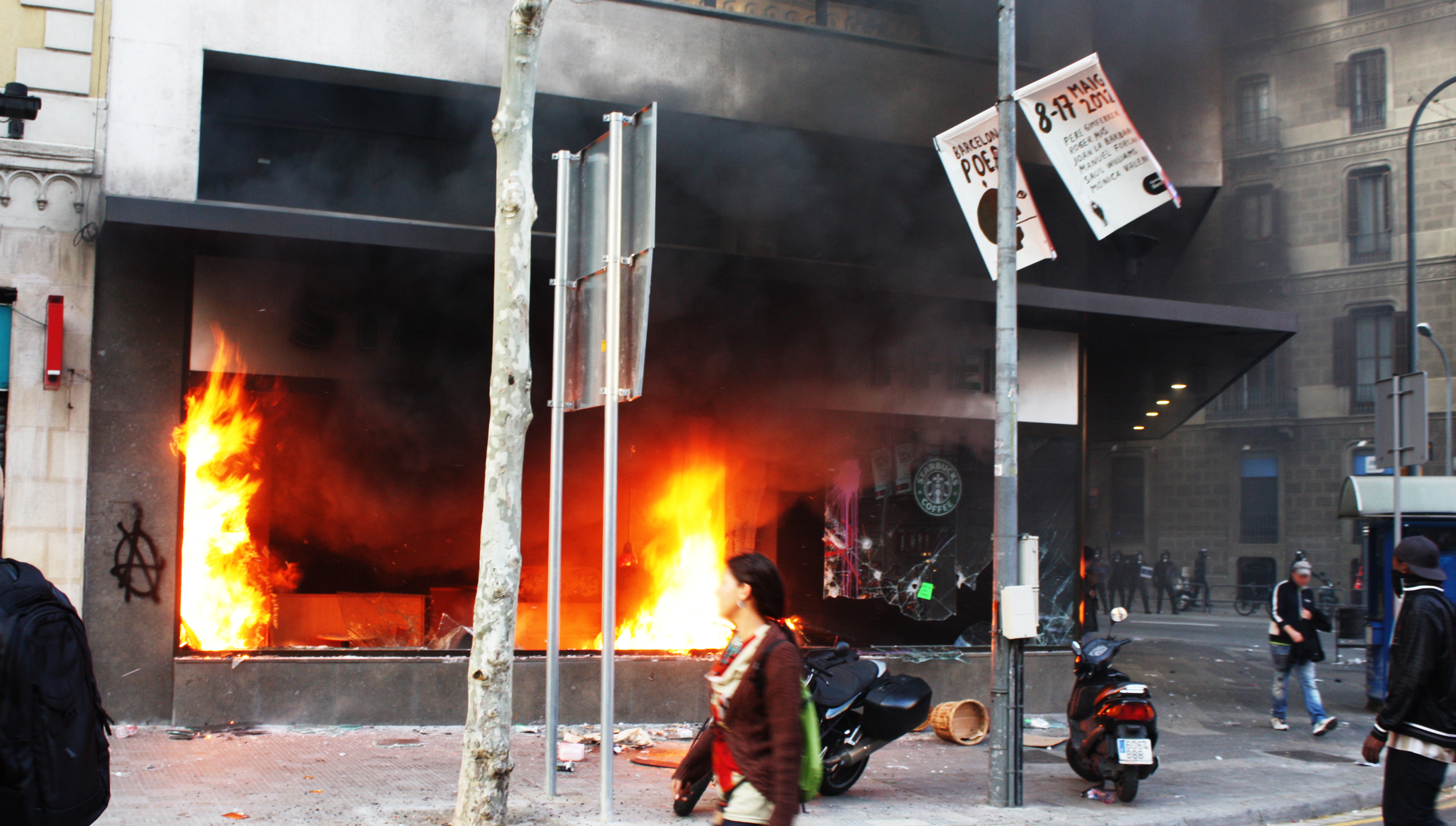
A Starbucks after anti austerity protests and riots in Barcelona in April 2012

Sports riots such as the Nika riots can be sparked by the losing or winning of a specific team or athlete. Fans of the two teams may also fight. Sports riots may happen as a result of teams contending for a championship, a long series of matches, or scores that are close. Sports are the most common cause of riots in the United States, accompanying more than half of all championship games or series. Almost all sports riots in the United States occur in the winning team's city.

== Effects ==
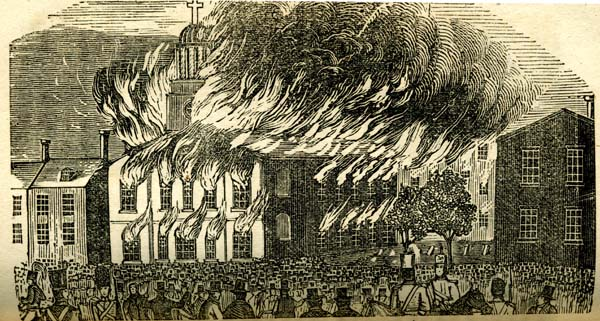
St. Augustine's Church on fire during the Philadelphia Nativist Riots in 1844

The economic and political effects of riots can be as complex as their origins. Property destruction and harm to individuals are often immediately measurable. During the 1992 Los Angeles riots, 2,383 people were injured, more than 12,000 were arrested, 55 people were killed and over 700 businesses burned. Property damage was estimated at over $1 billion. At least ten of those killed were shot by police or National Guard forces.

Similarly, the 2005 riots in France lasted over three weeks and spread to nearly 300 towns. By the end of the incident, over 10,000 vehicles were destroyed and over 300 buildings burned. Over 2,800 suspected rioters were arrested and 126 police and firefighters were injured. Estimated damages were over €200 Million.

== Riot control and laws ==
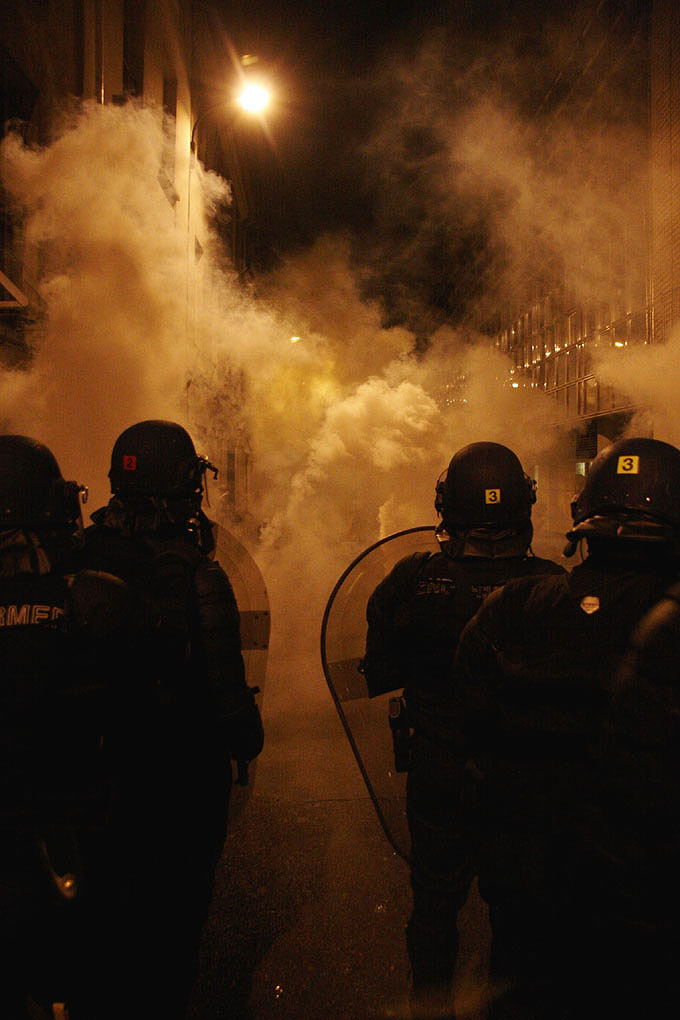
Law enforcement teams deployed to control riots often wear body armor and shields, and may use tear gas against anti-Sarkozy demonstrators in Paris

Riots are typically dealt with by the police, although methods differ from country to country. Tactics and weapons used can include attack dogs, water cannons, plastic bullets, rubber bullets, pepper spray, flexible baton rounds, and snatch squads. Many police forces have dedicated divisions to deal with public order situations. Some examples are the Territorial Support Group (London), Special Patrol Group (London), Compagnies Républicaines de Sécurité (France), Mobiele Eenheid (Netherlands), and Arrest units (Germany).

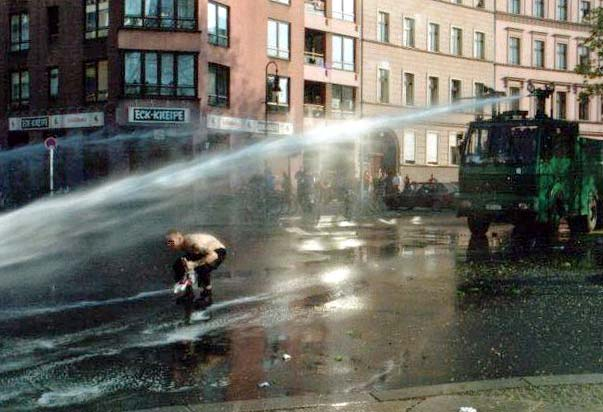
Water cannon during a riot in Germany, 2001

The policing of riots has been marred by incidents in which police have been accused of provoking rioting or crowd violence. While the weapons described above are officially designated as non-lethal, a number of people have died or been injured as a result of their use. For example, seventeen deaths were caused by rubber bullets in Northern Ireland over the thirty five years between 1970 and 2005.

=== Risk of arrest ===
A high risk of being arrested is even more effective against rioting than severe punishments. As more and more people join the riot, the risk of being arrested goes down, which persuades still more people to join.

=== National laws ===
==== India ====
In India, rioting is an offense under the Indian Penal Code (IPC).

==== Israel ====
In 1988 the Israeli army issued rules of engagement for the use of plastic bullets which defined a "violent riot" as a disturbance with the participation of three or more persons, including stone throwing, erection of a barrier or barricade, burning a tire.

==== United Kingdom ====
===== England and Wales =====
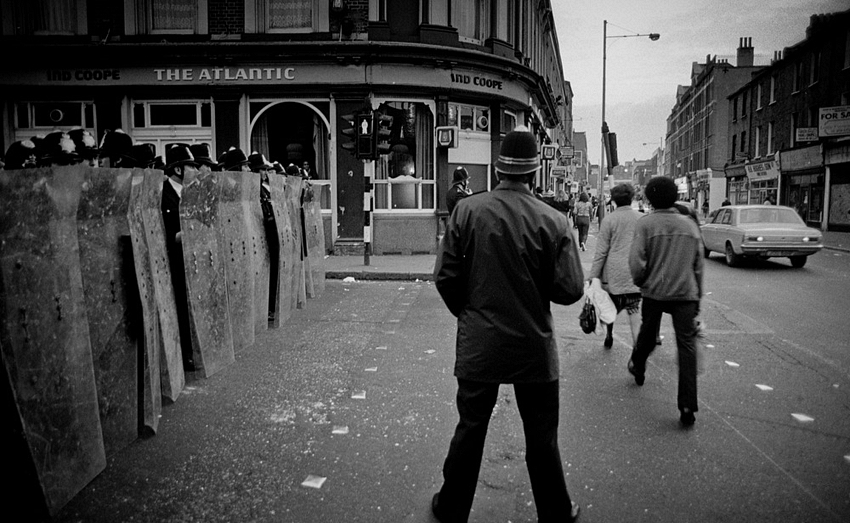
The Brixton race riot in London, 1981

Riot is a statutory offence in England and Wales. It is created by section 1(1) of the Public Order Act 1986. Sections 1(1) to (5) of that Act read:

(1) Where 12 or more persons who are present together use or threaten unlawful violence for a common purpose and the conduct of them (taken together) is such as would cause a person of reasonable firmness present at the scene to fear for his personal safety, each of the persons using unlawful violence for the common purpose is guilty of riot.

A single person can be liable for an offence of riot when they use violence, provided that it is shown there were at least twelve present using or threatening unlawful violence. The word "violence" is defined by section 8. The violence can be against the person or against property. The mens rea is defined by section 6(1).

In the past, the Riot Act had to be read by an official – with the wording exactly correct – before violent policing action could take place. If the group did not disperse after the Act was read, lethal force could legally be used against the crowd. See also the Black Act.

====== Mode of trial and sentence ======
Riot is an indictable-only offence. A person convicted of riot is liable to imprisonment for any term not exceeding ten years, or to a fine, or to both.

See the following cases:

- R v Luttman
- R v Pilgrim
- R v Keys
- R v Cooke

====== Association football matches ======
In the case of riot connected to football hooliganism, the offender may be banned from football grounds for a set or indeterminate period of time and may be required to surrender their passport to the police for a period of time in the event of a club or international match, or international tournament, connected with the offence. This prevents travelling to the match or tournament in question. (The measures were brought in by the Football (Disorder) Act 2000 after rioting of England fans at Euro 2000.)

====== Compensation for riot damage ======
See the Riot (Damages) Act 1886 and section 235 of the Merchant Shipping Act 1995.

====== Construction of "riot" and cognate expressions in other instruments ======
Section 10 of the Public Order Act 1986 now provides:

- (1) In the Riot (Damages) Act 1886 ... (compensation for riot damage) "riotous" and "riotously" shall be construed in accordance with section 1 above.
- (2) In Schedule 1 to the Marine Insurance Act 1906 (form and rules for the construction of certain insurance policies) "rioters" in rule 8 and "riot" in rule 10 shall, in the application of the rules to any policy taking effect on or after the coming into force of this section, be construed in accordance with section 1 above unless a different intention appears.
- (3) "Riot" and cognate expressions in any enactment in force before the coming into force of this section (other than the enactments mentioned in subsections (1) and (2) above) shall be construed in accordance with section 1 above if they would have been construed in accordance with the common law offence of riot apart from this Part.
- (4) Subject to subsections (1) to (3) above and unless a different intention appears, nothing in this Part affects the meaning of "riot" or any cognate expression in any enactment in force, or other instrument taking effect, before the coming into force of this section.

As to this provision, see pages 84 and 85 of the Law Commission's report.

====== History ======
The common law offence of riot was abolished for England and Wales on 1 April 1987.

Riot Act 1414 (Note: The citation of this act by this short title was authorised by section 5 of, and the second schedule to, the Statute Law Revision Act 1948. Due to the repeal of those provisions, it is now authorised by section 19(2) of the Interpretation Act 1978.)
- Act of Parliament
- Parliament of England
- Long title: Recital of the Statute 13 H. 4. c. 7. against riots, &c. (Note: These words are printed against this act in the second column of the second schedule to the Statute Law Revision Act 1948, which is headed "Title".)
- Citation: 2 Hen. 5. Stat. 1. c. 8
- Territorial extent: England and Wales

Dates
- Royal assent: 29 May 1414
- Commencement: 30 April 1414 (Note: Start of session.)
- Repealed: 1 January 1968
Other legislation
| Repealed by | Statute Law Revision Act 1948; Criminal Law Act 1967 |
| Relates to | Riot Act 1411; Riot Act 1495; Riot Act 1503 |

Status: Repealed

Text of statute as originally enacted

The Riot Act 1414 (2 Hen. 5. Stat. 1. c. 8) was an act of the Parliament of England.

The following provisions were repealed by section 1 of, and the first schedule to, the Statute Law Revision Act 1948 (11 & 12 Geo. 6. c. 62).:

- The words from the beginning to "officers aforesaid in this behalf; And that"
- The words "and ransom"
- The words from "And that the bailiffs" to "the same franchises"
- The words from "and that this statute" to the end of the chapter.

The whole act, so far as unrepealed, was repealed by section 10(2) of, and part I of schedule 3 to, the Criminal Law Act 1967, which came into force on 1 January 1968.

The statute 2 Hen. 5. Stat. 1, of which this chapter was part, was repealed for the Republic of Ireland by section 1 of, and part 2 of the schedule to, the Statute Law Revision Act 1983.

===== Northern Ireland =====
Riot is a serious offence for the purposes of Chapter 3 of the Criminal Justice (Northern Ireland) Order 2008.

See paragraph 13 of Schedule 5 to the Electoral Law Act (Northern Ireland) 1962.

===== Scotland =====
There is an offence under the law of Scotland which is known both as "mobbing" and "mobbing and rioting".

In July 1981, both Dundee and Edinburgh saw significant disorder as part of the events of that July, while in 1994 and in 2013, two years after the English riots of August 2011, Edinburgh saw rioting, albeit localised to one specific area and not part of any bigger 'riot wave'. Events in 1981 were very similar to those in England, although sources are severely limited. Both Niddrie and Craigmillar saw riots in the 1980s.

==== United States ====
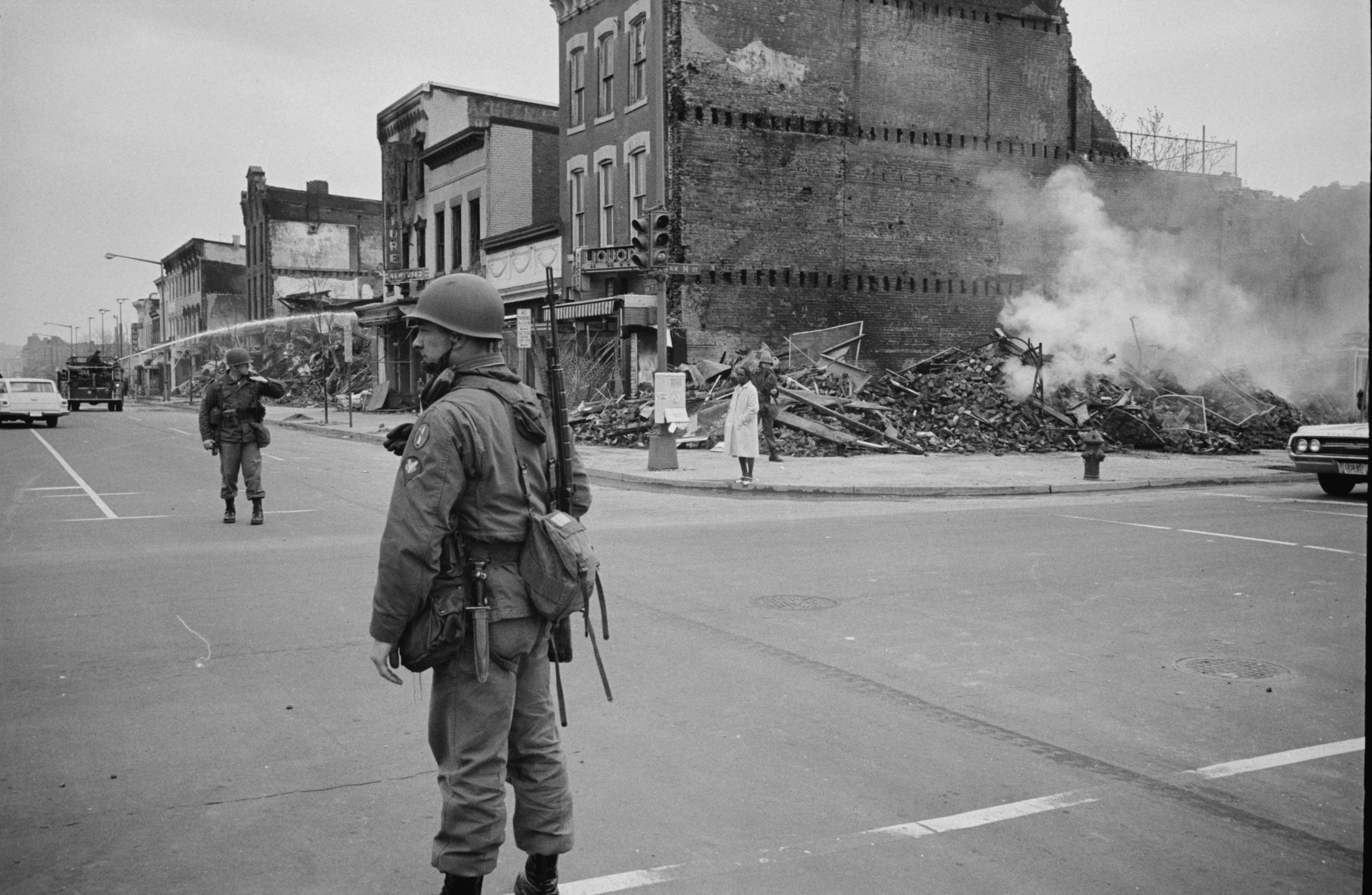
The aftermath of a Washington, D.C. riot in April 1968

Under United States federal law, a riot is defined as:

A public disturbance involving (1) an act or acts of violence by one or more persons part of an assemblage of three or more persons, which act or acts shall constitute a clear and present danger of, or shall result in, damage or injury to the property of any other person or to the person of any other individual or (2) a threat or threats of the commission of an act or acts of violence by one or more persons part of an assemblage of three or more persons having, individually or collectively, the ability of immediate execution of such threat or threats, where the performance of the threatened act or acts of violence would constitute a clear and present danger of, or would result in, damage or injury to the property of any other person or to the person of any other individual.18 U.S.C. § 2102.

Each state may have its own definition of a riot. In New York, the term riot is not defined explicitly, but under § 240.08 of the New York Penal Law, "A person is guilty of inciting to riot when one urges ten or more persons to engage in tumultuous and violent conduct of a kind likely to create public alarm."

== See also ==
- 1967 Newark riots, in USA
- Afrikaanderwijk riots
- 1977 Egyptian bread riots
- 2007–2008 world food price crisis
- Black bloc
- Boston bread riot, of 1710-1713
- Chicago race riot of 1919
- Civil disorder
- First Quarter Storm, Philippines, 1970
- Flour riot of 1837, in New York City
- Ferguson unrest, in US 2014
- George Floyd protests, across the US 2020
  - 2020 Black Lives Matter unrest
- Insurrectionary anarchism
- January 6 United States Capitol attack, in 2021
- List of incidents of civil unrest in the United States
- King assassination riots, in US 1968
- List of food riots
- List of riots
- Mass racial violence in the United States
- Orange Riots, Irish Catholics vs Irish Protestants in New York City, 1870-1871
- Pogrom, anti-Jewish attacks in Eastern Europe
- Poll tax riots, in UK 1990
- Rebellion
- Riot Acts, in UK law
- Riot gun
- Southern bread riots, Confederacy 1863
- Stonewall riots, New York City 1969
- Student riot
- Tulsa race massacre, in US, 1921
- Urban riot
- Wrocław football riot 2003
- 2024 United Kingdom riots
