= List of food riots =

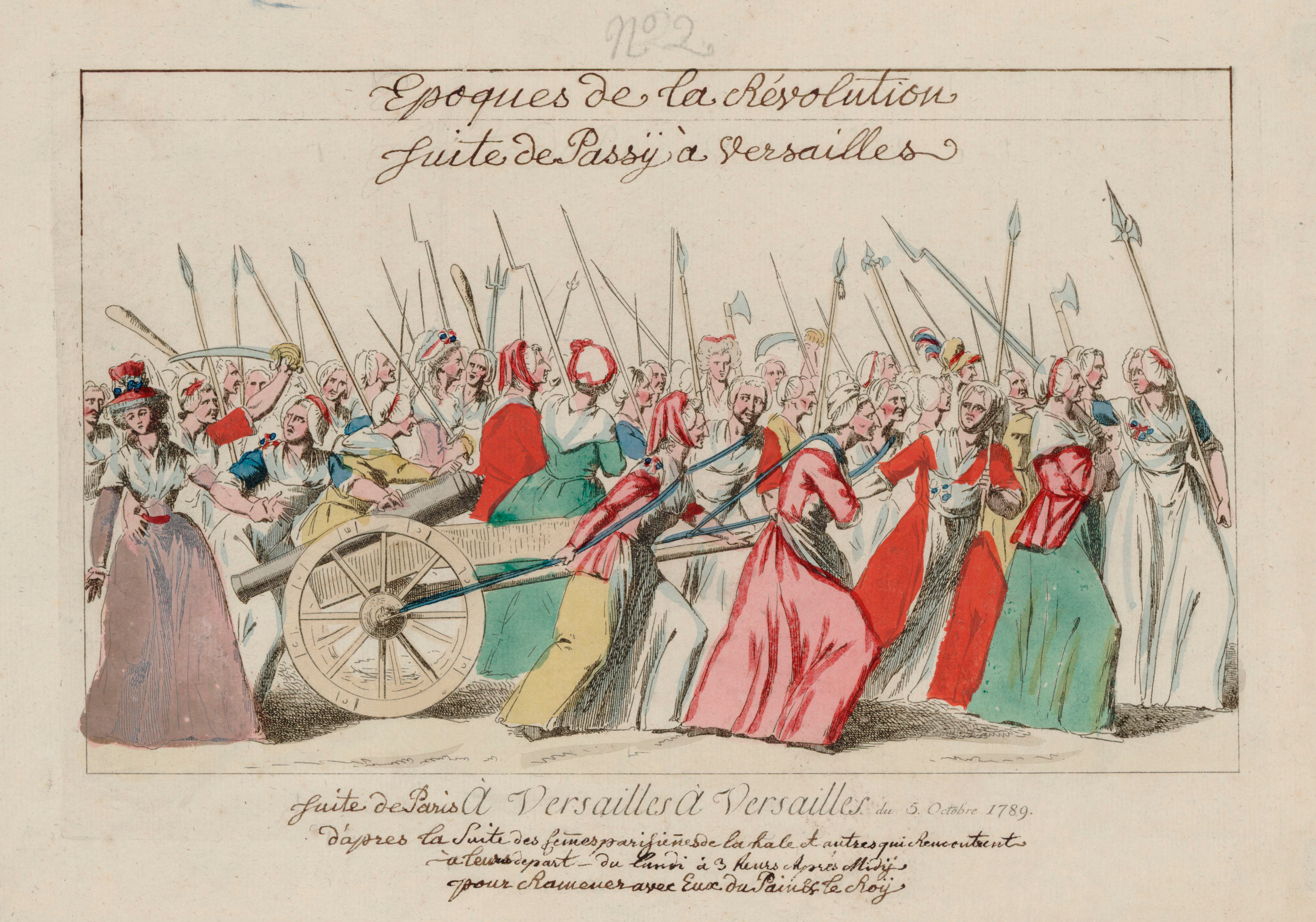
An illustration of the Women's March on Versailles, 5 October 1789

The following is a list of food riots.

== Food riots ==
=== 17th century ===
- Salt riot, also known as the Moscow Uprising of 1648, started because of the government's replacement of different taxes with a universal salt tax for the purpose of replenishing the state treasury after the Time of Troubles. This drove up the price of salt, leading to violent riots in the streets of Moscow.
- Novgorod uprising of 1650 – an uprising in Novgorod, caused by the Russian government's bulk purchasing of grain (traded to Sweden) and the resulting increases in the price of bread.

=== 18th century ===
- Boston bread riot – the last of a series of three riots by the poor of Boston, Massachusetts, between 1710 and 1713, in response to food shortages and high bread prices. The riot ended with minimal casualties.
- Nottingham cheese riot - merchants from Lincolnshire attempted to purchase large amounts of cheese in Nottingham to sell in their home county, upsetting the locals. The dispute broke out into rioting, involving mass looting of cheese wheels. The rioting eventually ended after several days due to military intervention.
- Flour War – occurring in 1775, this was an uprising caused by the excessive price of bread in France before the French Revolution. Early in the season for wheat harvesting and flour production, the government enacted fewer price controls than later in the year, leaving prices to the free market. This caused the price of flour to climb, and the working classes could not buy bread.
- Women's March on Versailles was one of the earliest and most significant events of the French Revolution. The march began among women in the marketplaces of Paris who, on the morning of 5 October 1789, were near rioting over the high price and scarcity of bread. Their demonstrations quickly became intertwined with the activities of revolutionaries who were seeking liberal political reforms and a constitutional monarchy for France.

=== 19th century ===
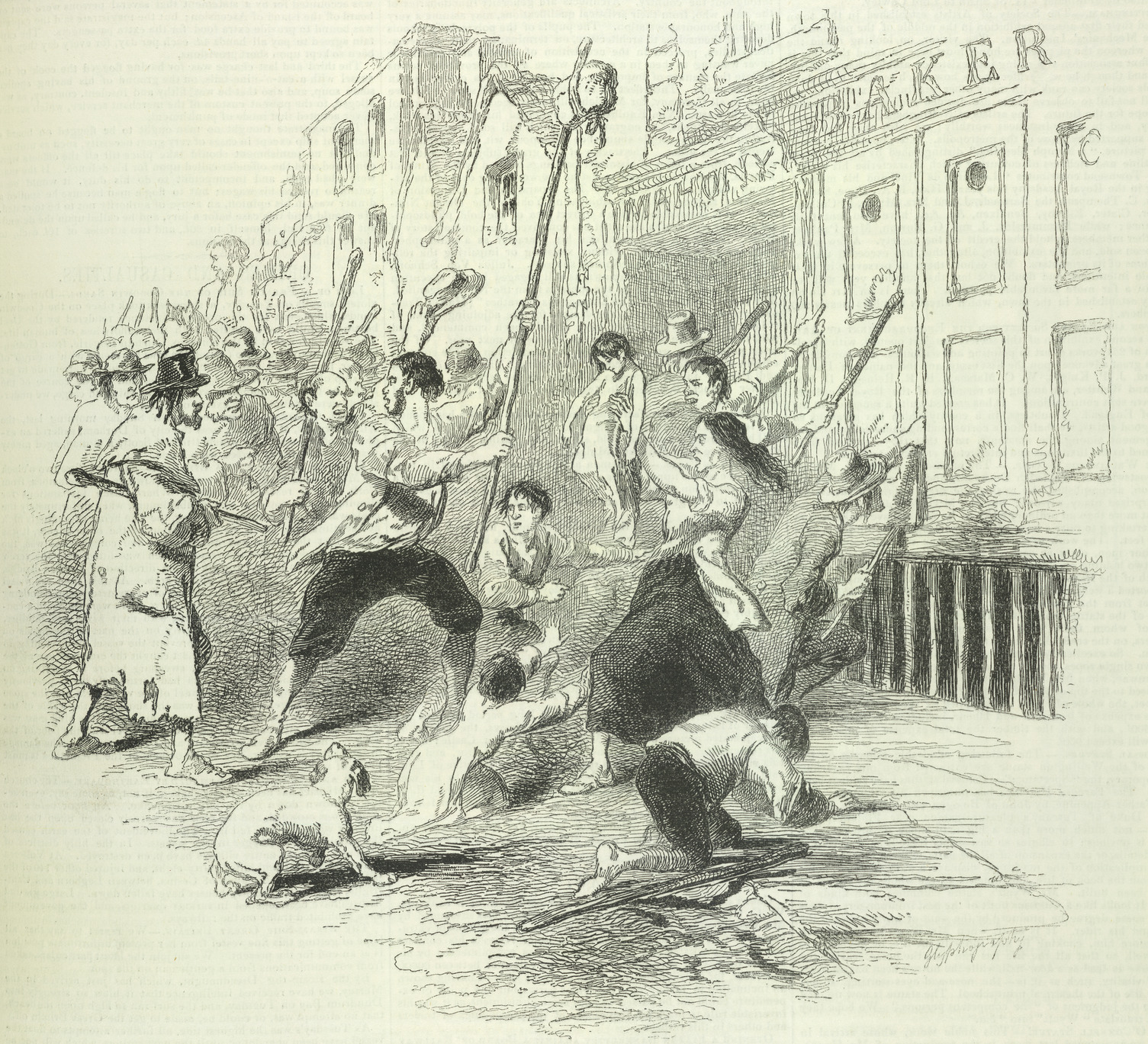
Great Famine: Rioters in Dungarvan attempt to break into a bakery (The Pictorial Times, 1846).

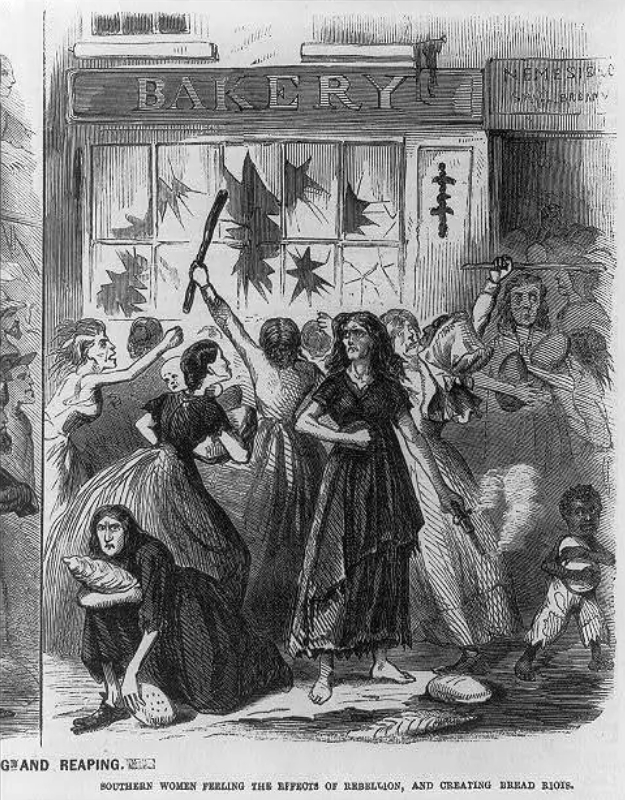
An illustration of the bread riots in Richmond, Virginia

- Potato crop failure in Ireland in 1830 led to food riots in Limerick on 25 June.
- Flour riot of 1837 – occurred in New York City in 1837. The riot was caused by a combination of poverty and the rising cost of flour.
- Potato riots – the mass anti-serfdom movement of peasants (1834 and 1840–44) in the Russian Empire.
- Grain riots took place in Ennis, Ireland on 6 June 1842, with Irish Constabulary police shooting at the crowd, killing three and wounding twelve; a policeman also lost an eye.
- Great Famine (Ireland) – several food riots took place, for example, in Dungarvan in 1846 and at Bantry in 1847.
- Potato revolution- several food riots took place in Berlin in 1847.
- Southern bread riots – events of civil unrest in the Confederacy, perpetrated mostly by women in March and April 1863. During these riots, which occurred in cities throughout the South, women and men violently invaded and looted various shops and stores.
- 1898 in Italy is marked by widespread bread riots all over the country

=== 20th century ===
- Meat riots occurred in the Chilean capital Santiago in October 1905, and was a violent riot that originated from a demonstration against the tariffs applied to the cattle imports from Argentina.
- Macaroni Riots – protests over a price increase on pasta products such as macaroni in the Italian American neighborhood of Federal Hill in Providence, Rhode Island, erupted into several nights of rioting that resulted in 50 arrests and several thousand dollars in property damage.
- Potato Revolt – social unrest that broke out in Lisbon and Porto in May 1917 due to hunger and rising cost of living.
- 1917 potato riots – a food shortage during World War I caused a food rebellion in the Dutch capital city Amsterdam in July 1917.
- Rice riots of 1918 – a series of popular disturbances that erupted throughout Japan from July to September 1918, which brought about the collapse of the Terauchi Masatake administration. A precipitous rise in the price of rice caused extreme economic hardship, and rural protests spread to the towns and cities.
- Maltese Sette Giugno, bread riot of 1919 in Malta, where 4 Maltese men died.
- 1939 Nupi Lan Revolt of Manipur, India – Nupi Lan – which means women's war in Manipuri – is one of the important movements in the history of Manipuri women. It sowed the new seeds of economic and political reforms for a new Manipur in the early 1940s. It was started in 1939 as an agitation by Manipuri women against the oppressive economic and administrative policies ruled by the Manipur Maharaja and the political agent Mr. Gimson of the British Government (1933–1945) in Manipur, and later on, evolved into a movement for the constitutional and administrative reform in Manipur.
- Novocherkassk massacre was events tied to the labor strike of a locomotive building plant in Novocherkassk, a city in the Soviet Union, (now Russia). The events eventually culminated in riots of 1–2 June 1962 when reportedly 26 protesters were killed by the Soviet Army troops, and 87 were wounded. The riots were a direct result of shortages of food and provisions, as well as the poor working conditions in the factory.
- 1970 Polish protests – sparked by a sudden increase of controlled prices of food.
- Food riots in the Middle East – several food riots occurred in the Middle East during the 20th century.
  - 1977 Egyptian bread riots – affected most major cities in Egypt 18–19 January 1977. The riots were a spontaneous uprising by hundreds of thousands of lower-class people protesting World Bank and International Monetary Fund-mandated termination of state subsidies on basic foodstuffs. As many as 79 people were killed and over 550 injured in the protests, which were only ended with the deployment of the army and the re-institution of the subsidies.
- 1981 Moroccan riots also known as the Casablanca bread riots
- Tunisian bread riots took place in December 1983 to January 1984.
- Moroccan Intifada of 1984, also known as the Hunger Uprising
- 1989 riots in Argentina – a series of riots and related episodes of looting in stores and supermarkets in Argentina, during the last part of the presidency of Raúl Alfonsín, between May and June 1989.
- Cardiff Ely bread riots in 1991

=== 21st century ===
- The 2007 West Bengal food riots occurred in West Bengal, India, over shortage of food and widespread corruption in the public distribution system. The riots first happened in Burdwan, Bankura, and Birbhum districts but later spread to other districts.
- Food riots were associated with the 2007–2008 world food price crisis.
- 2008 Egyptian general strike over rising food costs.
- 2016 and 2017 Venezuelan food riots – The steep fall in oil prices hit the Venezuelan economy hard. With inflation set to top 1,600% in 2017, the decline of Venezuela’s industrial base led to food shortages and economic collapse.
- July 2021 unrest in South Africa that initially began as protests in response to the arrest of former president Jacob Zuma quickly escalated into nationwide looting of supermarkets and shopping malls. The expanded scope of the unrest, that had followed a record economic downturn and increasing unemployment from the COVID-19 pandemic, has been described as food riots.
- 2022 Sri Lankan protests escalated in part due to food shortages and post-COVID-19 pandemic inflation.

== See also ==
- List of riots
