= Mary Jackson =

Mary Jackson may refer to:

== People ==
- Mary Jackson (Richmond bread riot) (fl. 1863), organizer of the 1863 Richmond bread riots in Civil War Richmond, Virginia, in the Confederate States
- Mary Jackson (actress) (1910–2005), American television character actress
- Mary Jackson (engineer) (1921–2005), American mathematician and aerospace engineer at NASA
- Mary Jackson (artist) (born 1945), American fiber artist from South Carolina
- Mary Jackson McCrorey (1867–1944), born Mary C. Jackson, American educator and mission worker
- Mary Ann Jackson (1923–2003), American child actress
- Mary Ann Jackson (illustrator) (1819–1915), English botanical illustrator
- Mary Anna Jackson (1831–1915), widow of Confederate Army general Thomas "Stonewall" Jackson
- Mary E. Jackson (1867–1923), African-American female suffrage activist, YWCA leader and writer
- Mary M. Jackson (born 1966), United States Navy officer
- Mary Percy Jackson (1904–2000), English-born Canadian medical practitioner
- Mary Jane Jackson (1837–1897), American serial killer, sex worker, and criminal

== Fictional characters ==
- Mary Jackson (Coronation Street), in Coronation Street, played by Barbara Ashcroft
- Mary Jackson, in the Stephen King novels The Regulators and Desperation

== Other uses ==
- Mary Jackson School, a senior high school in Keg River, Alberta, Canada
- Mary W. Jackson Building, the official name of NASA Headquarters in Washington, D.C., in the United States
