= Alexandrian riots =

Alexandrian riots may refer to:

- The Alexandrian riots (38), attacks directed against Jews in 38 CE
- The Alexandria riot (66), riots in 66 CE, coinciding with the outbreak of the First Jewish–Roman War

== See also ==
- 2005 Alexandria riot, an anti-Christian riot
- Bombardment of Alexandria, British military action in response to anti-Christian riots in 1882
- Food riots in the Middle East § Egypt
