= Potato riots =

Food riots in the Russian Empire

Peasant uprising of 1860 as depicted by Sergei Vasilyevich Gerasimov (1951)

The "potato riots" (Russian: Картофельные бунты, romanized: Kartofeliyniye bunty; Belarusian: Бульбяны бунт, romanized: Bulbyani bunt) were the mass anti-serfdom movement of udelnye krestyane (imperial peasants; peasants in the personal property lands of the Russian imperial house) in 1834, and of state peasants in 1840–44, in Russian Empire. The reason for the rebellion was the coercive introduction of potato cultivation. The government selected the best fertile sections for potatoes from peasant lands. Authorities enforced brutal punishments for the non-fulfillment of the orders and assessed different requisitions. In 1834 unrest flared up in Vyatsky and Vladimir provinces, but it reached its height among the state peasants in 1840–44. Riots appeared simultaneously and they were partly in response to Pavel Kiselyov's reforms of state villages (1837–41). In the provinces of Ural and the lower Volga Region more than 500,000 peasants rose up destroying sowings of potatoes, and thrashing officials. They arbitrarily re-elected wardens, and attacked punitive detachments with weapons. Aside from ethnic Russians, participants in the riots included the Mari population, Chuvashes, Udmurts, Tatars, and Komi. The government sent troops to suppress the riots. In a number of places, peasants were shot. Thousands of rebels were convicted, and exiled into Siberia or forcibly drafted as soldiers.

The eschatological rumours associating potato planting with the service to the Antichrist has also contributed to the magnitude of the disturbances.

== See also ==
- List of food riots
