= Riot Act 1411 =

Act of the Parliament of England

Riot Act 1411 (Note: The citation of this act by this short title was authorised by section 5 of, and the second schedule to, the Statute Law Revision Act 1948. Due to the repeal of those provisions, it is now authorised by section 19(2) of the Interpretation Act 1978.)
- Act of Parliament
- Parliament of England
- Long title: Justices of the peace and sheriffs shall arrest all rioters and record their offences and inquire thereof... (Note: These words are printed against this act in the second column of the second schedule to the Statute Law Revision Act 1948, which is headed "Title".)
- Citation: 13 Hen. 4. c. 7
- Territorial extent: England and Wales; Ireland

Dates
- Royal assent: 19 December 1411
- Commencement: 3 November 1411 (Note: Start of session.)
- Repealed: 1 January 1968

Other legislation
- Repealed by: Statute Law Revision Act 1948; Criminal Law Act 1967
- Relates to: Forcible Entry Act 1381; Forcible Entry Act 1391; Riot Act 1414; Riot Act 1495; Riot Act 1503

Status: Repealed

Text of statute as originally enacted

The Riot Act 1411 (13 Hen. 4. c. 7) was an act of the Parliament of England.

== Subsequent developments ==
The act was extended to Ireland by Poynings' Law 1495 (10 Hen. 7. c. 22 (I)).

The words from "and the same justices" to "made to the contrary" were repealed by section 1 of, and the first schedule to, the Statute Law Revision Act 1948 (11 & 12 Geo. 6. c. 62), which came into force on 30 July 1948.

The whole act, so far as unrepealed, was repealed by section 10(2) of, and part I of schedule 3 to, the Criminal Law Act 1967, which came into force on 1 January 1968.

The statute 13 Hen. 4, of which this chapter was part, was repealed for the Republic of Ireland by section 1 of, and part 2 of the schedule to, the Statute Law Revision Act 1983.

== See also ==
- Riot Acts
