= 2007 West Bengal food riots =

Riots in India

The 2007 West Bengal food riots took place in West Bengal, India over shortage of food and widespread corruption in the public distribution system. The riots first happened in Burdwan, Bankura, and Birbhum districts but later spread to other districts. The riots started on 16 September 2007 in Radhamohanpur village in Bankura district.

Three villagers were shot dead and more than 300 villagers were injured in riots. At least three ration distributors committed suicide. The State Government suspended 113 dealers and served show cause notices to 37 food inspectors. A Supreme Court of India appointed committee has found wide-spread corruption to be the root cause of the riots.

== Causes ==
India had a public distribution system that was used to distribute food grains to poor people at affordable prices fixed by the government. These food grains are distributed through Ration Shops, to card-holders. Many of these ration shop dealers were also Rice Mill owners, able to control the entire chain of supply. In 2007-08 a worldwide phenomenon of increasing food prices motivated some of the dealers to sell quality food grains in open market while inferior quality grain was distributed through the ration shops. At the same time, a move by the state government to exclude some of the families above poverty line from the PDS system. Faced with increasing food prices, this led to increasing discontent among the masses.

In many places, the houses of local PDS dealers were set on fire and looted in many instances. The threat of violence and public humiliation also led to a few PDS dealers committing suicide. The riots originated from Bankura district in the latter half of the year, soon spreading across many other districts in the state.

A report by the commission appointed by the Supreme Court of India found that wide spread corruption and diversion of superior quality food grains caused the riots. The report said studies conducted by the government had shown that 34.9% of rice and 86.6% of wheat meant for PDS got diverted, while 83% of wheat meant for below poverty line people and 60% of rice (the essential diet of the poorest of the BPL families) also got stolen.

== See also ==
- List of food riots
