= 1837 New York flour riot =

Civil disturbance on New York City in 1837

Flour riot of 1837
- Date: February 1837
- Location: New York City
- Participants: Locofocos
- Outcome: 500–600 barrels of flour and 1,000 bushels of wheat stolen or destroyed

The flour riot of 1837 was a food riot that broke out in New York City in February 1837, and lasted less than a day. This violent civil disturbance grew out of a public meeting called by the Locofocos to protest runaway prices, as hungry workers plundered private storerooms filled with sacks of hoarded flour. Commodity prices had skyrocketed over the winter of 1836–37, an inflationary boom fueled by foreign investment and two successive years of wheat crop failures. The riot was also a sign of the impending financial crisis known as the Panic of 1837, that hit the American economy the following month.

== Background ==
The Panic of 1837 was largely influenced by the monetary policies of U.S. President Andrew Jackson, including the executive order known as the Specie Circular, which required hard money for the purchase of federal land in the west, in addition to subsequent changes in banking policy. These resulted in widespread rising prices and bank failures. Within two months the losses from bank failures in New York alone aggregated nearly $100 million. Out of 850 banks in the United States, 343 closed entirely, 62 failed partially, and the system of State banks received a shock from which it never fully recovered.

Over the winter of the previous year, the price of flour rose from between $5.62 and $7 a barrel to $12. The cost of meat rose substantially, with pork going from $13 to $24.50 over three years. Coal, used for home heating, did likewise, reaching $10 per ton. The prices of rent grew such that efforts were underway to organize tenants to refuse to leave their residences when their leases expired, and force their land lords to court.

In February of that year, a rumor circulated that there was only three or four weeks supply of flour on hand. This was picked up in newspapers, who added reports that vast supplies were being hoarded by merchants for the purpose of driving up prices yet higher. The reports railed against "an atrocious and wicked conspiracy by rich speculators," a group of "veritable vermin who prey upon the community".

Some in the temperance movement sought to blame prices on the amount of grain used by distilleries, but the scorn of many fell on local commission merchants, with large stores of grain in their facilities. Rumors and anonymous letters began to circulate about plots to raid the stores.

== Events ==
On February 10 a bulletin was posted throughout the city reading:

The voice of the people shall be heard and will prevail. The people will meet in the Park, rain or shine at four o'clock Monday afternoon to inquire into the cause of the present unexampled distress, and to devise a suitable remedy. All friends of humanity, determined to resist monopolists and extortioners, are invited to attend.

A crowd of four to five thousand gathered as beckoned on Monday morning February 13. A succession of speakers roused them on topics ranging from Bentonian currency to high rents, monopolists, and most topically, the price of flour. The final speaker, of unknown identity, rallied the crowd to move on Hart & Co. saying:

Fellow citizens, Mr Eli Hart has now 53,000 barrels of flour in his store; let us go and offer him eight dollars a barrel for it and if he will not take...

At this point someone touched his shoulder, a reminder of what he may be about to incite, and he finished "We shall depart in peace". But this final notion was lost on the crowd. They seized on the moment and advanced toward the stores. The clerks present, hearing the approaching commotion, closed and barred the doors and windows at Hart & Co, but one door left open provided the opportunity for the crowd to breach the facility and begin rolling barrels out into the street.

Mr. Hart himself, gathered a detachment of police and advanced toward the warehouse. They were attacked and disarmed by the crowd, but arrived nonetheless, and frightened off those inside. The mayor hurried to the scene, but so did those gathered in the park who by now were becoming aware of what had happened. The mayor addressed the crowd and urged them to desist and disperse, but was met with stones and ice thrown with sufficient fury, that he was forced to seek safety.

The crowd assaulted the warehouse, broke down the doors and out the windows, and began to roll and tumble barrels of flour into the street where they were fell upon by those present. Shortly thereafter, police arrived, followed by the National Guard.

As the crowd scattered, some fell on E. J. Herrick's flour store, but were dissuaded when a representative assured them they had been selling flour at a reasonable rate. They moved on to S.H. Herric & Son and repeated the looting ritual until they were assuaged by the owner, who addressed the crowd, and promised to gift his flour to the poor the next day. The police arrived and made what arrests they could.

By 9:00 PM the riot had ended, and the crowd had dispersed or been arrested.

== Results ==
By the time police and militia arrived and dispersed the crowd 500 to 600 barrels of flour and a thousand bushels of wheat had been destroyed. In total, some 40 people were arrested.

Within a day of the riot, a law was passed to add 192 to the ranks of the police force.

== See also ==
- List of food riots
- List of incidents of civil unrest in New York City
- List of incidents of civil unrest in the United States
