= Riot Acts =

Stock short title used for legislation

Riot Act (with its variations) is a stock short title used for legislation in the jurisdictions of both the United Kingdom and Ireland relating to riot.

== List ==
Acts of the Parliament of England

- 17 Ric. 2. c. 8 (The whole chapter was repealed by section 10(2) of, and Part I of Schedule 3 to, the Criminal Law Act 1967, wherein the entry for this act in the column headed "title or short title" is "(Riots)")
- The Riot Act 1411 (13 Hen. 4. c. 7)
- The Riot Act 1414 (2 Hen. 5. Stat. 1. c. 8)

Act of the Parliament of Great Britain

- The Riot Act (1 Geo. 1. St. 2. c. 5) (1714 or 1715)

Acts of the Parliament of the United Kingdom

- The Riotous Assemblies (Scotland) Act 1822 (3 Geo. 4. c. 33)
- The Riot (Damages) Act 1886 (49 & 50 Vict. c. 38)

Act of the Parliament of Ireland

- The Riot Act 1787 (27 Geo. 3. c. 15 (I)) (Repealed for by section 16 of, and the Third Schedule to the Criminal Law Act, 1997)

== See also ==
- Anti-Riot Act
- List of short titles
- Statutes concerning forcible entries and riots confirmed
