= Potato revolution =

1847 food riot in Berlin

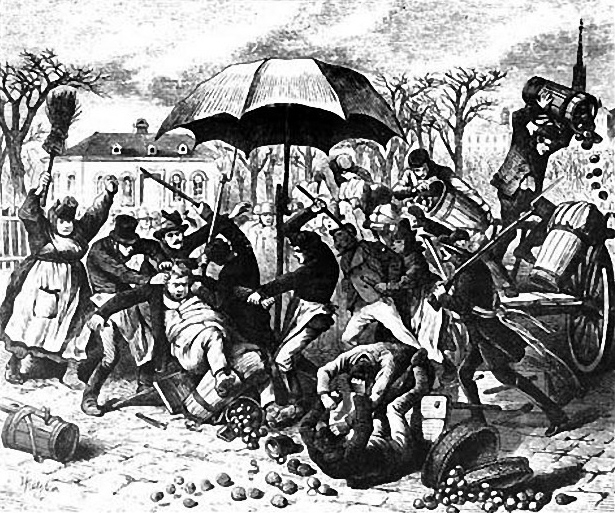
The lithograph Sturm auf die Kartoffelstände shows an angry crowd attacking potato merchants. Vinzenz Katzler (1823–1882), around 1847 in Vienna.

The "Potato revolution" (in German, Kartoffelrevolution) is the name given to the food riot that took place in the Prussian capital Berlin between April 21 and April 22/23, 1847.

This was triggered by failed harvests due to the then-ongoing European potato failure, which also caused the Great Famine in Ireland as well as famine crises and increased food prices in other European countries. Another reason was the social misery of large sections of the urban population. The revolt, which was also directed against the widespread fraudulent practices of Berlin's bakeries and butchers, was put down by the military. Like the First United Parliament of Prussia, which had opened shortly before, the potato revolution was also part of the prehistory of the Berlin March Revolution of 1848.

== Terminology and classification ==
The term "potato revolution" was coined by contemporaries. However, it was also used for other riots before and after, such as in 1844 in Newcastle in the Limerick area or in 1872 in Tarnow near Lemberg. In his work Berliner März 1848, the writer Adolf Streckfuß (1823–1895) also used this term to describe the revolt. It is based on the fact that the hunger and social revolt began with the looting of potato stalls, but hardly does justice to the events, as the insurgents did not only attack potato stalls. The protest also affected bakeries and butchers as well as "localities and status symbols of wealthy Berlin citizens" (Rüdiger Hachtmann).

The "potato revolution" was one of 193 known hunger riots that shook the German Confederation in 1847. 65 percent of these uprisings took place on Prussian soil; only its western provinces were largely spared. Manfred Gailus estimates that tens of thousands of people actively participated in hunger riots in the German states in 1847. The Berlin "potato revolution" was a mixture of different forms of protest: The initial "market riot" developed into a broader attack on grocery stores. According to political scientist Wilhelm Bleek, while the protests in populous cities (which were growing rapidly due to immigration) such as Berlin and Stuttgart adopted features of a "violent power struggle with the authorities and the wealthy", the events in small towns were often limited to a "redistribution" of food. In the German states, food riots were the "main form" of social protest between 1840 and 1850. Comparable hunger crises can only be found in the 1790s and 1816/1817.

== Causes ==
Three factors were decisive in bringing about the Berlin "potato revolution": firstly, the potato and grain harvest of 1846 in Prussia was on average 30 to 50 percent lower than in previous years. The potato pest Phytophthora infestans, which was found in North America, had already been introduced to Europe in 1845. In the same year, this fungus caused major damage to the fields in the western provinces of Prussia. The eastern provinces were only affected in isolated cases due to the weather conditions. In Ireland, which was particularly susceptible due to its rainy summer months and temperate winters, the fungus triggered the so-called Great Famine. The potato tubers often rotted while still in the ground. In 1846, the failure of the potato harvest in Prussia was accompanied by poor rye and wheat yields due to the exceptionally bad weather conditions: heavy rain in April and subsequent drought. In the Rhineland, the rye yield fell by around 50 percent in 1846, in Silesia by as much as 60 percent.

Secondly, the Prussian government and the city administrations reacted inadequately to the crop failure. To prevent social unrest, grain stocks had been bought up early in all German residential cities - except Stuttgart and Berlin. It was not until January 1847 that the Prussian government commissioned Liedke, a private secretary inexperienced in agricultural trade, to buy up Russian grain. He then purchased goods that turned out to be of inferior quality. On arrival at the port of Stettin, it became clear that the grain was spoiled. The edible part of the Russian grain that was still milled was stretched by adding barley and corn flour. For its part, the Berlin city council had already petitioned the Prussian King Friedrich Wilhelm IV in October 1846 to ban the export of grain, potatoes and spirits.However, the Prussian Minister of the Interior, Ernst von Bodelschwingh, replied that the petition had been submitted without the knowledge of the Berlin magistrate. Because of this formal error, it had not been passed on to the king. The resulting shortage of food in the city caused the price of rye to double in April 1847 and the price of potatoes to rise three to five times. In 1846, five pounds of potatoes cost one Silbergroschen, by the end of January 1847 it was three, and in April five Silbergroschen. This sum was equivalent to half the average daily earnings of most Berliners. As a result, economically weaker groups in the city were affected by hunger and malnutrition even more than before.

Thirdly, this trend in the markets was countered by the fact that the state had hardly any means of control. A police decree from 1846 required Berlin bakers to have their price lists checked by a police lieutenant. Accordingly, de jure prices for certain sizes of bread had to be adhered to. In reality, however, these regulations could not be enforced by the market police across the board. In many cases, Berlin bakers therefore evaded the regulations by using inferior materials or falsifying weights. The dissatisfaction of market shoppers over this everyday grievance, which had accumulated over decades, finally erupted in the "potato revolution".

The problems mentioned were combined with the generally precarious social situation of large sections of the population. Many families moved from the countryside to the big city. The resulting oversupply of labor depressed wages in Berlin. At the same time, working hours increased, often to 17 hours a day. Child labor was part of everyday life. Even minimal price fluctuations were enough to turn hunger into a mass phenomenon in the city. A financial and industrial crisis led to mass redundancies in Berlin's textile and engineering sectors in 1847. The number of unemployed increased even further.

== The riots ==
=== Spread in the urban area ===
Researchers are in dispute as to where exactly the "potato revolution" started. The difficulties here lie in the large-scale distribution of the riots throughout the city and the numerous actions by independent groups. On the morning of April 21, 1847, riots broke out in eight marketplaces in the city at roughly the same time. The centers of these first riots were mostly the outer districts of Berlin, especially Friedrichstadt, Rosenthaler Vorstadt and the area to the east of Alexanderplatz.

According to Rüdiger Hachtmann, the "potato revolution" actually began on Belle-Alliance-Platz, today's Mehringplatz. At a potato stall, a farmer's wife provoked a crowd with " rough answers" to such an extent that several women violently attacked her and stole her potatoes.

Manfred Gailus, on the other hand, describes the Gendarmenmarkt as the starting point of the riots. A crowd had attacked a potato seller because of inflated prices. She fled to a bakery in Charlottenstraße, which was subsequently besieged, stormed and looted by the crowd. While only the market squares were affected on the morning of April 21, the riot spread to the streets and stores in the city center at midday. The area around the Berlin Palace and the street Unter den Linden was seized. "Symbols of state power", churches and bourgeois wealth became the focus of the insurgents on the evening of April 21. The windows of the Royal Opera House, several luxury hotels, the Kranzler and Spargnapani cafés and, more by chance, some windows of the Prince of Prussia's palace were smashed on Unter den Linden, which some contemporaries "probably wrongly" saw as a political protest against its occupant. The windows of churches in the center, such as the Bethlehem Church, and the gas lanterns in Wilhelmstraße and Friedrichstraße were also destroyed, so that passers-by - as one contemporary noted - could "only walk on broken glass."

=== Storming of stores ===
A total of 45 stores were stormed, including 30 bakeries and eleven butcher's shops. An illustrative scene of the riots can be reconstructed from the report of a court hearing: Around noon on April 22, 1847, a crowd gathered in Weberstraße in front of a bakery. In this heated situation, the wife of a locksmith is said to have attracted the attention of the crowd. Not only did she claim that the master baker was baking "the smallest bread", she also accused him of not having distributed any bread yet. The crowd then forced their way into the bakery and the harassed baker lost bread worth around 50 thalers. The store sign was also stolen from him.

Throughout the city, the theft of food, especially bread and sausages, could not be stopped. The insurgents did not only steal out of hunger. In some cases, they deliberately destroyed the food, for example "by trampling it and throwing it into the gutter". In this way, they publicly expressed their anger at the methods of the shopkeepers. When storming the stores, the insurgents also damaged or stole "furniture" and "equipment". All doors and windows were smashed and public life came to a standstill: Markets remained deserted, the doors and windows of stores were barricaded with heavy objects. On April 22 and 23, performances in the theaters were canceled. Schools remained closed.

=== Role of the police and the military ===
It was difficult for the police to intervene quickly for many reasons: the market police and gendarmerie formally assigned to the area initially underestimated the extent of the unrest, as the different incident locations were spread over a wide area of the city. The soldiers stationed in Berlin were therefore initially not deployed. Although a few soldiers were on duty on the afternoon of April 21, they were overwhelmed by the scale of the uprising. The commander-in-chief of the garrison in Berlin, Prince Wilhelm, was still in the theater for part of the evening. It was not until the morning of April 22 that Wilhelm had a meeting with his officers in which Berlin was divided into three "districts". One cavalry and one infantry regiment were responsible for each district. Nevertheless, the military did not succeed in completely dispersing the uprising until around midnight. The military maintained a presence in the public sphere until April 25, 1847. It enforced lower prices for food in the marketplaces and searched for participants in the uprising.

A contemporary archivist of the city of Berlin, Paul Clauswitz, assumes that at the time of the "potato revolution", only 30 police officers were supposed to maintain public order. This deplorable state of affairs brought the bourgeois opposition onto the scene. They demanded the establishment of a larger police force or, alternatively, the formation of a vigilante group that could react to social unrest at an early stage. On April 23, 1847, the Berlin magistrate approached the Prussian Ministry of the Interior with a request to approve the formation of military "protective associations" in times of unrest. Interior Minister Bodelschwingh rejected the request, as vigilante groups would undermine the state's monopoly on the use of force. Under no circumstances did the state want to allow the liberal opposition to be supported by the forces of law and order. The leadership was to remain solely in the hands of the aristocracy close to the government. Nevertheless, the Potato Revolution brought about personnel changes: the city governor Karl von Müffling had to vacate his post in October 1847. He was replaced by Friedrich von Wrangel. Julius von Minutoli replaced Eugen von Puttkamer as Chief of Police.

=== Arrests ===
Gailus estimates that a total of five to ten thousand people took part in the potato revolution. Given this scale, the military was only able to capture a small proportion of them. The prisoner log can therefore provide little information about the actual social composition. However, craftsmen and unskilled workers appear to have made up the majority of the insurgents. Only around three hundred people were arrested. But even this number pushed the capacity of the Berlin prisons to their limits. 120 prisoners had to be provisionally housed in the military detention center in Lindenstraße. Of those arrested, 107 were brought before the Berlin Court of Appeal, 87 of whom received sentences. However, some of the insurgents were sentenced by police judges without a lengthy trial. The statistics do not show how many people were affected by this. The trials lasted six weeks. The harshest sentence was passed on a 32-year-old worker, father of two children, who was sentenced to ten years in prison and 30 lashes for beating an officer and snatching a soldier's sabre. Most of those sentenced were released again thanks to an amnesty on October 15, 1847, on the occasion of King Friedrich Wilhelm IV's birthday.

== Political dimension ==
=== Reaction of the First United Parliament ===
The "potato revolution" took place at a politically explosive time: Since April 11, 1847, a corporative assembly of representatives from all eight provinces of Prussia had been in Berlin, the so-called First United Diet. The Potato Revolution was therefore visible to a large part of the country's social elite, which cast the royal government in the worst possible light. However, the parliament did not regard the riots in the streets and squares as political. Although isolated remarks about the "potato revolution" can be found in the deputies' letters, the Assembly did not react to the riots until days later. On April 27 and May 17, 1847, the deputies held "emergency debates", whereby the Prussian bureaucracy was largely blamed for the riots. On April 27, 1847, the state parliament passed a ban on the export of potatoes for a period of six months. These were no longer allowed to be traded to countries outside the Deutsche Zollverein. On the same day, Parliament banned the processing of potatoes into schnapps. On May 17, 1847, the representatives agreed to create short-term employment opportunities. However, no long-term reform plans to alleviate the economic hardship of large sections of the population were adopted.

=== Political significance for the revolution of 1848 ===
An important research question is to what extent the "Potato Revolution" can be counted as part of the political prehistory of the Berlin March Revolution of 1848. Wilfried Löhken directly links the Berliners' willingness to use violence against soldiers and police in the barricade struggle with previous events such as the Tailor's Revolution of 1830 and the Potato Revolution. The historian Armin Owzar also believes that the potato revolution was "an indication of a fundamental politicization that had long since also affected women", who were primarily responsible for buying food. The historian Ilja Mieck also saw the food shortage of 1847 as a cause of the "increasing politicization of a broader public". However, according to Mieck, the "potato revolution" was "first and foremost a hunger revolt arising from the unbearable hardship and not a conscious, politically motivated uprising, even if political demands were combined with economic ones". Historian Rüdiger Hachtmann comes to a similar conclusion. According to Hachtmann, the insurgents were primarily demanding "cheap bread, not a different political system". Despite the riots the day before, the Prussian king was able to take his midday walk on the boulevard Unter den Linden undisturbed on April 23, 1847. According to Günter Richter, the relatively quick suppression of the "potato revolution" remained in the memory of the Prussian government. This experience initially led them to the "misjudgement" that they would also be able to disperse the protests on March 18, 1848, with the help of soldiers.

=== Reception at the time ===
The political interpretation of the "Potato Revolution" was already a topic in contemporary historiographies. In his history of the first Prussian Reichstag, the philosopher and writer Karl Biedermann (1812–1901) accused the conservative forces of misusing the uprising to defame the First United Parliament: The opponents of the Parliament had spread the rumor that the government had been slowed down by the Estates Assembly in resolving the social emergency, as the latter was "not making much haste" and was even "taking advantage of the people's distress." The writer Adolf Streckfuß (1823–1895) blamed the inhabitants of Berlin's suburbs for the riots in the capital in his 500 Jahre Berliner Geschichte, Vom Fischerdorf zur Weltstadt. Although he considered the uprising to be apolitical, according to the interpretation of political scientist Claudia von Gélieu, he saw it as a "dangerous vanguard of a coming age". Despite his "masculine language", Streckfuß does not conceal the fact that the uprising was initiated and largely supported by women.

== Sources ==
- Biedermann, Karl (1847). Geschichte des ersten preußischen Reichstags (in German). Leipzig: Biedermannsche Verlagsbuchhandlung.
- Streckfuß, Adolf (1867). Berlin im 19. Jahrhundert. In vier Bänden (1867–1869) (in German). Vol. 3. Berlin: Seidl. p. 325.
- Streckfuß, Adolf (1948). Berliner März 1848. Das Neue Berlin (in German). Berlin.

== Bibliography ==
- Bass, Hans-Heinrich (1991). Hungerkrisen in Preußen während der ersten Hälfte des 19. Jahrhunderts (= Studien zur Wirtschafts- und Sozialgeschichte. Band 8) (in German). St. Katharinen: Scripta Mercaturae. ISBN 3922661904.
- Gailus, Manfred (1990). Straße und Brot. Sozialer Protest in den deutschen Staaten unter besonderer Berücksichtigung Preussens, 1847–1849 (= Veröffentlichungen des Max-Planck-Institut für Geschichte Göttingen. Band 96) (in German). Göttingen: Vandenhoeck & Ruprecht. ISBN 3525356323.
- von Hellfeld, Matthias (2022). "Hunger und Elend – Kartoffelrevolution 1847.". 1848 in 48 Kapiteln. Geschichte einer Revolution (in German). Freiburg: Herder. pp. 221–225. ISBN 9783451391552.
- Löhken, Wilfried (1991). Die Revolution 1848. Berlinerinnen und Berliner auf den Barrikaden (in German). Berlin: Edition Hentrich. ISBN 392617580X.
- Inga, Weise (1991). Die Berliner Kartoffelrevolution. Eine Fallstudie zum sozialen Protest im Vormärz. (Master's thesis at the Free University of Berlin 1991) (in German). Berlin: Freie Universität.
- Wernicke, Kurt (1999). Vormärz – März – Nachmärz. Studien zur Berliner Politik- und Sozialgeschichte 1843–1853 (in German). Berlin: Edition Luisenstadt. ISBN 3895421057.
- Wernicke, Kurt (1997). "… der betretene Weg der Unordnung. Kartoffelrevolution in Berlin 1847". Berlinische Monatsschrift (Luisenstädtischer Bildungsverein) (in German). 4: 19–23. ISSN 0944-5560.
