= Food riots in the Middle East =

Food riots refer to protests, riots, and civil unrest attributed to popular outrage against food shortages and high or rising prices of food. In the 20th and 21st century, food riots occurred across the Middle East in several different countries. Immediate causes of food riots have included reduction in food subsidies, inflation, and economic stagnation. Food riots have also occurred as part of larger social movements. Food riots also figure prominently in criticism of austerity, neoliberal, and related IMF structural adjustment policies, such as during the 1977 Egyptian Bread Riots.

== Egypt ==
Egypt experienced food riots in 1977, 1984 and 2017.

On Sunday, October 1, 1984, Egyptians in the Kfar el-Dewar industrial outside of Alexandria rioted and fought with police for eight hours. The rioters, who were said to number in the hundreds, "pelted police with stones, overturned carts in the town market, and smashed shop windows," according to one news report. The police reported that one person was killed, 13 people were injured, and 40 people (including police) were arrested.

== Jordan ==
Food riots hit Jordan in 1989 and 1996. At the beginning of 1989, Jordan defaulted on debt payment to the IMF, leading it to introduce price increases between 10 and 15% In April. That month the unrest began in the southern town of Ma'an before spreading to other cities in the south of Jordan. At least four civilians and one off-duty soldier were killed and total casualties reached at least 32 people in what would come to be known as habbat nissan, or the "Squalls of April". While the 1989 riots were occurring in Jordan, King Hussein gave an interview with PBS' Robert MacNeil. At the time, Hussein stated:

Our economy's sound and the promise of the future is great, but nonetheless, we have had to devaluate the Jordanian dinar and recently engaged the International Monetary Fund in talks, and that providing us with the potential to reschedule our foreign debt, half of which is military and half economic. This is a result of the awful situation we found ourselves, in when promises of the Arab states did not materialize as a result of the Baghdad summit, and the size of this foreign debt is equal to the commitments that were not forthcoming.

== Lebanon ==
Food protests began on Thursday, August 27, 1987, in Beirut and spread to other towns over the next few days. Marchers in the southern town of Sidon chanted "We're hungry! We want to eat!" and protests were logged by the police in the Eastern Lebanon town of Rasheiye in the Bekaa.

Occurring 12 years and 120,000 deaths into the Lebanon Civil War, the onset of the riots coincided with that day's record fall of the value of the Lebanese pound against the dollar to 300 to 1. The falling exchange rate had considerable repercussions at a time when Lebanon imported 85% of its basic needs.

== See also ==
- List of food riots
