= 1977 Egyptian bread riots =

Widespread civil unrest over food subsidies

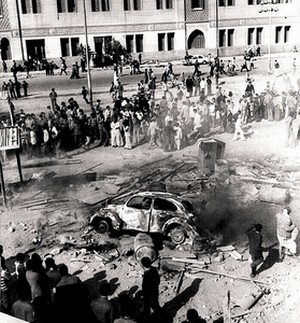
Cairo fires 1977.

The Egyptian "bread riots" of 1977 (Arabic: انتِفاضة الخُبز, romanized: intifāḍhat-ul-khobz, lit. 'The Bread Intifada') were a spontaneous uprising against the increase in commodities' prices on the 18th and 19 January after the Egyptian government cut subsidies for basic foodstuff.

The riots were carried out in the Egyptian bigger cities. When the army was deployed on the twentieth of January, order was forcibly reestablished. Around 80 people were killed, over 550 injured and approximately 1200 were arrested during the protests.

== Origins of the food subsidy system ==
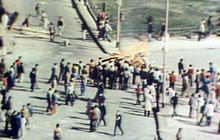
Demonstrations and riots in Cairo in 1977.

The roots of Egyptian subsidy system are to be found during World War II (in 1941), when the government wanted to assure everyone access to basic food, in rationed quantity and at low prices. The initial purpose was therefore not to provide the poor with food they could afford.

In the 1950-1960s the program was still affordable for the government but when in the 1970s new food items were added, the country's debt increased considerably. In 1975, food subsidies made up for 16,9% of the total government expenditures.

In the 1980s the program consisted of subsidies on almost twenty foodstuffs (among which: bread, flour, sugar, rice, tea, edible oil, beans, lentils, macaroni, coffee, sesame, shortening, imported cheese, frozen meat, fish, eggs and chicken), which the people could access through ration cards that granted them specific prices. These were given to 90% of Egyptians. In the years that followed, the government gradually decreased the number and quality of subsidies: today subsidies only apply to four basic food items (coarse baladi bread, wheat flour, edible oil and sugar).

== Lead up to riots ==
The origins of the riots lay in the people's dissatisfaction with Anwar Sadat's government and Sadat's will to conform to start economic relations with the West. The legacies of Gamal Abdel Nasser's "moral economy" were still very present in Egypt after his death. Sadat followed his footsteps and tried to implement the same ideas but did not succeed.

To reduce the burden of the $9000 million worth debt, Anwar Sadat pursued Infitah (openness) policies, which had—since he took power in 1970—sought to liberalise the economy and privileging the bourgeois class, which supported the government. The two successive wars of 1967 and 1973 severely impacted the debt to the point that, until 1975, over 50% of Egypt's GDP went to the military. In 1976, Sadat sought loans from the World Bank. However, the problem was that in order for the country to receive loans, it had to conform to international standards and market prices. The country's debt at the eve of the agreements with the IMF in 1977 amounted for the 42% of the total GDP. Furthermore, in the second half of the 1970s Egypt's agricultural stagnation led the country's food consumption to depend for the 40% on foreign imports, of which 78% was wheat. The fault for the poor harvests was attributed to Nasserian agrarian reforms, which brought restrictions on landownership, low crop prices and rent controls in favour of fair land distribution.

As stated in the interview by Dr. Hamed Latif el-Sayeh (minister of the Economy and Economic Cooperation in 1977), the government had four major beneficiaries of the total budget: the military, investment, subsidies and debt service. The military spending could not be reduced, and instead it was even increased to provide the army with modern equipment. Investment and debt could not be modified either, so the "not trained politicians" reduced what seemed to be the least worst: the subsidies. They certainly did not expect a people's uprising; the last uprising in fact dated back to 25 years before, when the so-called Cairo fires erupted in reaction to the British Occupation.

The precipitance of Mamdouh Salem's (the Egyptian prime minister) decision to cut the government's aids on the seventeenth January was explained by the Minister of Economics Abdel Muneim al-Kasouni as a way to avoid "long debates and manipulation of supplies". He also argued that the increase was legally allowed by law and that it was programmed in the general program of the government. The rise in prices affected basic commodities such as bread, tea, flour, rice, cigarettes and gas for heating. It is estimated that the cost of living after the reform increased by 15%. The cut of subsidies, seen from the people's perspective, topped a series of problems that Sadat's government was not facing or failing to address, such as shortages in housing and food, transport inefficiency, and employment.

Sadat's liberal economic policies involved allowing foreign ownership of some sectors of the economy, prohibited by the 1962 National Charter, agreements to ensure foreign investments and interruption of social protection policies, such as minimum wages.

== Food riots ==
Partly because of the above-mentioned economical reasons, the riots erupted in Egypt's big cities. The last straw that broke the camel's back were the rising prices of baladi bread. Baladi bread is Egypt's most consumed bread and it holds a 'considerable political weight' in the country, as it acts as the primary component of the Egyptian's people diet. It is cheap bread and has been subsidized by the Egyptian government since 1941. This caused the bread to be a social contract between the government and the people. On the night of 17 January, official prices were increased by administrative decision without consultation of the Assembly. When Egyptians realized the increase in price of commodities on the morning of the 18 January, protests erupted.

The first riots began at Alexandrian Arsenal, a maritime factory where around 5000 pro-Nasser workers protested against Sadat's political decisions. Protests rapidly spread to the other big cities, like Cairo, Luxor and Aswan. In Cairo, protests started with workers from the city's industrial southern suburb of Helwan. Students and other social groups soon joined, while the middle class limited themselves to commenting the economic policies.

The state's timing when raising the prices was not considered good. Students constituted a large part of protesters, as schools were in session and they were easily mobilized. Because the gas prices had also risen, the price difference was very feelable for the people, who needed gas to warm their houses.

The protests were intense. Police stations were the main target. Symbols of the state and signs of foreign presence were also attacked. Rioters attacked all those elements that recalled to the prosperity of the middle class and the corruption of the regime, shouting slogans like, "Ya batal el-'obur, fen el-fotür?" ("Hero of the Crossing, where is our breakfast?") and "Ya haramiyat al-Infitah, sha'b Masr mish mirtah" ("Thieves of the Infitah, the people of Egypt are famished"). There were also shouts of "Nasser, Nasser," in reference to Sadat's predecessor, Gamal Abdel Nasser. Sadat's pro-IMF measures and his support for global capitalism namely clashed with Nasser's opposition to the UK and the US, caused by their support for Israel.

It is said that the military did not want to go on the streets initially to protest against the government's sudden decision, and that the police had to try to re-establish order with its means. The claim that rioters wanted to overthrow the regime is hard to believe since, even though they presented traits of organization, they still were not symptoms of a larger plot against Sadat.

== End of the riots ==
To help the country to counter the riots, the IMF conceded a $150 million loan to Egypt to re-establish order. The cut to subsidies was suspended and the country had to rethink its domestic and foreign policies.

In a public speech in the days that followed the insurrections, the President claimed that the violences were instigated and organised by the Communists, backed by the Soviet Union, and by the left. He also stated that democracy had its own teeth, the next time he would be ruthless. Part of the responsibility was also attributed to Libya, with which Egypt had tense relations following the lack of economic support in the aftermath of the 1967 War against Israel. Three weeks after the bread riots the government organized a plebiscite on an eight-points programme.

The points addressed:

- The need to modify the law on how to form parties by the legislative Assembly;
- Punishability of membership in clandestine organizations;
- Punishability of demonstrations with sabotage intent by imprisonment;
- Payment of taxes;
- Registration of property and wealth, with penalty in case of fraud or failure to do so;
- Criminalisation of rioters or instigators of public disruptions with penal servitude;
- Imposition of penal servitude on workers who, by striking, harmed national economy;
- Imposition of penal servitude on demonstrations that threatened public security.

In the February plebiscite, the government assured tax exemption to people with an income lower than E£500 or owned a maximum of three fadeins. However, it also harshly condemned the rioters that threatened national security. The government claimed that 99% of the electorate voted in favour, nevertheless observers believe that no one did effectively vote. Some opposed the Prime Minister's move and the results of the plebiscite. Among those, Khalid Muhyi-al-Din (spokesman for the left), claimed the violation of the principle of presumed innocence by Salem. Also, Kemal al-Din Hussein, an independent member of the Parliament condemned the unconstitutionality of the plebiscite and was eventually expelled from the Assembly. Similarly, the journal Al-Tali'ah, was closed down for this reason.

Those who were sentenced by the executive because of their participation in the revolts, however, were declared innocent by the Supreme Council of State Security. Sadat responded with the so-called "Law of Shame" (Arabic: قانون العيب), that vaguely condemned several political sins and had to be executed by a court in the hands of deputies of the People's Assembly.

The incident eventually caused the creation of the Central Security Forces for riot and crowd control, though its duties expanded to protection governmental fixed sites, foreign embassies and missions, high risk arrests and SWAT operations.

== See also ==
- List of modern conflicts in the Middle East
- 1986 Egyptian Conscription Riot
- 2008 Egyptian general strike
- Egyptian Revolution of 2011
- Tunisian bread riots
- List of food riots
- Food riots in the Middle East
