= Potato Revolt =

Revolt in Portugal, 1917

Date	May 14–31, 1917
Location	Lisbon and Porto, Portugal
Result	Government victory

Belligerents
Portugal	(First Portuguese Republic) Protesters

Commanders and leaders
(First Portuguese Republic) Afonso Costa	None

Units involved
(First Portuguese Republic) GNR (First Portuguese Republic) Portuguese Army	None

Strength
Unknown	>4,000

Casualties and losses
Unknown	~60 killed Many wounded Hundreds arrested

The Potato Revolt was a social unrest that broke out in Lisbon and Porto, with reverberations in several other Portuguese cities, between May 19 and 21, 1917, in protest against hunger and the rising cost of living. People looted grocery stores and warehouses, and a state of siege was declared in Lisbon and Porto.

== Background ==
In the spring of 1917, Portugal faced a severe food crisis, caused by the economic strain of World War I. Bread became increasingly scarce in Lisbon. By May, rumors circulated that bakeries were intentionally withholding bread from the population. On May 14, the situation worsened as crowds gathered outside bakeries, leading to looting and riots.

== Revolt ==
Riots broke out across Lisbon in neighborhoods such as Alcântara, Campo Grande, Benfica, and the Baixa. On May 19, bakeries that still had bread sold out before dawn, leaving many without food. The crowds turned their frustration toward other sources of sustenance, protesters began looting grocery stores, warehouses, and other establishments like shoe shops.

The police and GNR struggled to contain the violence. Protesters responded to government forces with firearms and explosives. By May 20, the government declared martial law, suspending civil liberties and deploying military forces to restore order. Despite these measures, riots continued, spreading to the neighboring cities of Lisbon and other parts of the country.

== Aftermath ==
The state of siege remained in place until May 31, by which time hundreds had been arrested and dozens killed. Systematic searches were conducted to recover stolen goods, from food items like codfish and potatoes to goods and clothing.

In parliament, Prime Minister Afonso Costa attributed the disturbances not to the government’s failures but to anarchist and syndicalist agitators intent on causing disorder. Propaganda campaigns were launched to discredit the protesters, branding them as monarchical sympathizers and traitors.
