= Tunisian bread riots =

1983–84 deadly anti-austerity protests

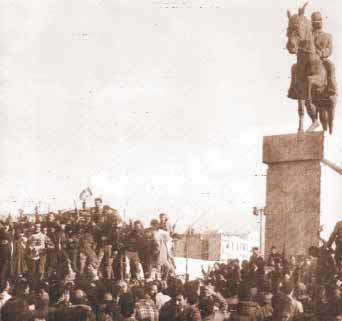
- Crowd in Africa Square, Tunis, January 1984
- Date: 29 December 1983 – 5 January 1984
- Location: Tunisia
- Caused by: Food price increase

Casualties
- Death: c. 150
- Injuries: c. 1,000

The Tunisian bread riots (French: émeutes du pain, Arabic: أحداث الخبز) were a series of violent demonstrations in Tunisia that occurred from December 1983 to January 1984, triggered by a rise in the price of bread due to an IMF-imposed austerity program. President Habib Bourguiba declared a state of emergency and the riots were put down by force. Over 100 rioters died. The regime was weakened by the upheavals and the aftermath of food riots. Three years later General Zine El Abidine Ben Ali seized power in a coup d'état.

== Background ==
In the 1970s, the Tunisian economy experienced high levels of growth (roughly 8% annually) due to agricultural and petroleum exports in addition to growing tourism. By the early 1980s, though, the European economy stagnated. This had affected Tunisia since its economy relied on exports to Europe and tourists from Europe. The government was struggling to meet rising expenses when a fall in the price of oil towards the end of 1983 further reduced revenue. In August 1983, there were several increases in the price of basic foods and goods, leading to the average cost-of-living increasing by 8%.

President Bourguiba agreed to seek a loan from the International Monetary Fund (IMF). The IMF loan was conditional on government spending cuts, removal of exchange controls, elimination of protective tariffs and devaluation of the currency.

The government decided to end subsidies on wheat and semolina, the main ingredients of bread. At the time, food subsidies accounted for 3.1% of gross domestic product and 10% of the state budget. The subsidies favored the wealthy as much as the poor. The decision was announced on 29 December 1983, and led to an immediate rise in the price of bread and flour. Prices went up by over 100%. The increase, the first in fifteen years, directly affected the poor. Some Tunisian families spent 80% of their food budget on bread and semolina.

During these riots, bread served as a symbol in opposition to poverty, oppression, and neoliberal economic policy. The subsidies were removed at a time of growing political tension. Leftist parties were becoming more popular, as were the Islamist movements, while members of the political elite were jostling for position in anticipation of the aging president's death or resignation. The southern region had been suffering from a drought, which caused a poor harvest. Many of the men in this region traditionally left to work in the coastal towns of Tunisia or as migrant laborers in Libya, and were having difficulty finding work. Open political opposition to the government had recently been expressed in the south, which the government blamed on "foreign-inspired agitators", pointing the finger at Libyans and Lebanese.

== Events ==
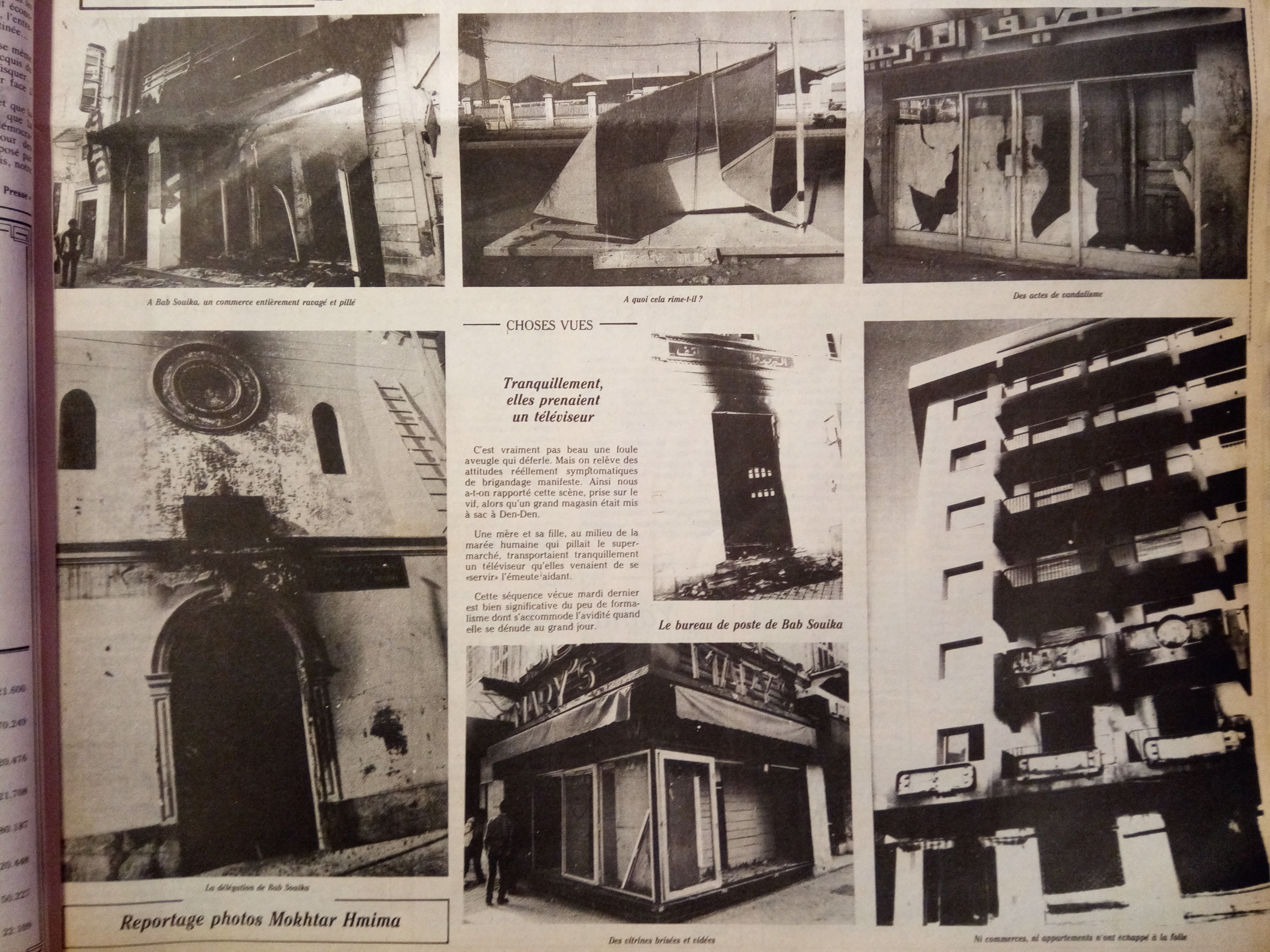
Pictures of the damage caused by bread riots published by La Presse in 1984

The first riots were on December 29 in the semi-desert region of Nefzaoua in the south. Riots began in the poverty-stricken and marginalized oases of this region. Although the price rise was the trigger, underlying causes were growing social and economic difficulties. There was speculation that the disturbances were in part fueled by grievances among Islamist groups. Most of the rioters were young and poor, including farmers, seasonal workers and the unemployed. Women supported the rioters, and in some cases participated. Thus in the small southern town of Al-Mabrouka a group of women workers in a textile factory marched into the town chanting slogans against the price rise. They were joined by men, students and even children, and the mob went on to storm the police station, party headquarters, town hall and National Guard headquarters. Security forces fired on the protesters, killing several people. The riots spread to the industrial center of Kasserine by Sunday, and to Gafsa and Gabès by Monday . In Sfax, a major port city, twelve people were killed and twenty were injured. On Sunday January 1, 1984, a peaceful protest occurred in the city of Gafsa, organized by Umar Thabet Qaadir, who served as the leader of the local branc of the Human Rights League. However, the protest was met with a heavy police presence. On Tuesday 3 January 1984 a state of emergency was declared after the unrest had spread to Tunis and Sfax.

The rioters were supported by students, who went on strike in solidarity. Many protestors initially joined in the streets with bread prices as their main focus, chanting the slogan, "Bourguiba, you are generous, leave us the bread at 80 millimes." However, the police response was massive. The demonstrators roamed the streets yelling anti-government slogans and attacking symbols of power, encouraged by onlookers in the windows and on rooftops. Slogans included: “Power, murderer, is this your policy of openness?” and “We are hungry, and the bread is 170 millimes.” The rioters looted and burned shops, destroyed street signs, attacked cars and buses and attacked public buildings. Local observers of the riots said the protesters showed "rage" or "hatred" against the rich as well as the authorities. They attacked shops that sold luxury goods, rampaged through wealthy neighborhoods and set fire to luxury cars. There was a feeling that the elite were wealthy only because of their political connections. They took the wealth of the country and spent it on imported goods, contributing little if anything to the country. Islamist slogans included "There is but one God and Bourghiba is the enemy of God."

A dusk-to-dawn curfew was imposed, all schools were closed and public gatherings of over three people were banned. Bus service was suspended and shops and cafes closed. Soldiers and riot police were deployed in the streets and at crossroads. The rioters hurled rocks at policemen, who responded with tear gas. In Tunis "Barricades went up everywhere. Again and again, troops opened fire on the crowds with automatic weapons. Tanks and armored personnel carriers rumbled through the streets, often firing on anything that moved. Many protestors were killed, and many more wounded, including women and children." The army even used helicopters against the protesters. They had restored order by 5 January 1984. By the time the protests ended more than 150 of the rioters had been killed. (Note: The official findings were that 89 people died and 938 were wounded, of whom 348 belonged to the security forces. The Tunisian Human Rights Defense League estimated that 110 people died. Other sources put the number of dead at "over 150".)

== Aftermath ==
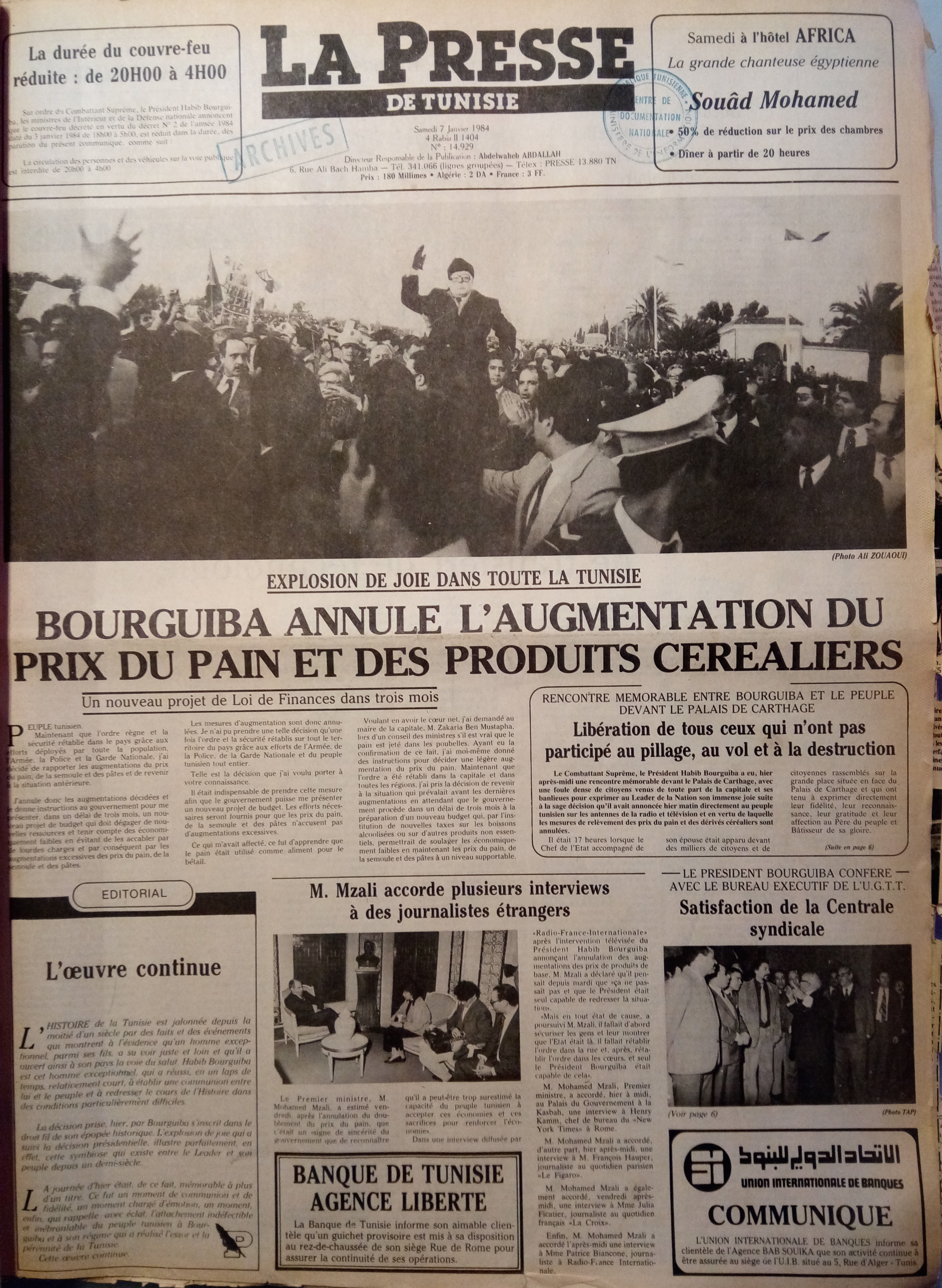
Front page of La Presse on January 7, 1984, announcing the cancellation of bread price increase

President Bourguiba announced on 6 January 1984 that the increase in the price of bread and flour had been cancelled. He gave the impression that Prime Minister Mohammed Mzali had not been authorized to raise prices. The handling of the price rise damaged the position of Mzali, who had been seen as the probable successor to Bourguiba. The prime minister temporarily assumed the post of Minister of the Interior. In an attempt to recover his popularity Mzali toured the provinces after the riots, promising projects to create new jobs. Mzali said, "the first lesson to be drawn from the events of January was that it is necessary to reorganise the forces of order so that they can respond adequately to all situations."

Relations with Libya soured after the riots, with the Tunisian government implying that Libya had been involved in stirring up the trouble. Libya denied any involvement. As the price of oil continued to drop, thousands of workers from Libya and other oil states returned to Tunisia, further weakening the economy. Bourguiba dismissed the Minister of the Interior, Driss Guiga, who took the blame for the way the disturbances had been handled. Guiga was later accused of corruption and treason. Bourguiba also dismissed the ministers who had supported the IMF loan.

The government was convinced that the Islamic Tendency Movement (Mouvement de la Tendence Islamique, MTI) had been behind the riots, and arrested many of its supporters. The MTI leaders had encouraged their followers to join in the riots, but the government produced no proof that they had organized them. The persecution of the MTI enhanced its reputation as an organization committed to helping the people. As part of a clamp-down on the opposition, General Zine El Abidine Ben Ali was reappointed director-general of national security. Soon after Ben Ali was made minister of the interior. The 1984 riots set the stage for the constitutional coup staged by Ben Ali in 1987. Under Ben Ali's administration, a neoliberal economic system was implemented which worsened tensions between the Tunisian people and the government. Ben Ali was himself exiled in 2011. Hunger has continued in Tunisia since 2011, in 2022 the World bank stepped in by providing a loan to lessen the impact which the Russian invasion of Ukraine will put on locals and farmers. In the long term, this loan is hoped to help lessen the country's reliance on imports, which will hopefully keep more income within their borders.

== Sources ==
- "Curfew Imposed Across Tunisia as Riots Spread". The New York Times. Associated Press. 4 January 1984.
- Entelis, John Pierre (1997). Islam, Democracy, and the State in North Africa. Indiana University Press. p. 98. ISBN 0-253-21131-X.
- Gana, Nouri (2013). The Making of the Tunisian Revolution: Contexts, Architects, Prospects. Oxford University Press. ISBN 978-0-7486-9103-6.
- Guay, Jean-Herman (2015). "29 décembre 1983: Déclenchement des émeutes du pain en Tunisie". Perspective Monde.
- Lief, Louise (10 January 1984). "Tunisia's riots pose troubling questions". Christian Science Monitor.
- Prince, Rob (15 April 2013). "Structural Adjustment: Former President Ben Ali's Gift to Tunisia (Part One) Tunisia and the International Monetary Fund". Foreign Policy in Focus.
- "Tunisia Report Places Blame for Bread Riots". The New York Times. Reuters. 23 April 1984.
- Shaked, Haim; Dishon, Daniel (1986). Middle East Contemporary Survey, Vol. 8, 1983-84. The Moshe Dayan Center. ISBN 978-965-224-006-4.
- "Tunisia: Bourguiba Lets Them Eat Bread". Time. 16 January 1984.
- Walton, John K.; Seddon, David (2008-09-15). Free Markets and Food Riots: The Politics of Global Adjustment. John Wiley & Sons. ISBN 978-0-470-71271-9.
