= Boston bread riot =

Series of three riots by the poor of Boston, Massachusetts

The Boston bread riot was the last of a series of three riots by the poor of Boston in Massachusetts Bay Colony between 1710 and 1713, in response to food shortages and high bread prices. The riot ended with minimal casualties.

== Riot ==
In the early 18th century, the city of Boston had very little arable land, and most grain had to be imported from surrounding towns or from abroad. It was common practice for the larger local grain merchants to hoard grain to drive up local prices, and to sell grain in more lucrative foreign markets such as Europe or the sugar plantations of the West Indies. On top of this, Queen Anne's War (1702–1713) interfered with foreign trade. By 1709, Boston was experiencing a serious food shortage and skyrocketing bread prices.

In April 1710, a group of men broke the rudder of a cargo ship belonging to merchant Andrew Belcher to stop its cargo of wheat from being shipped away and sold abroad. The next day, about 50 men attempted to force the ship's captain ashore, intending to loot the ship of its grain. They were arrested, but popular support for their cause resulted in them being released without charges.

In May 1713, a mob of more than 200 rioted on Boston Common, protesting high bread prices. The mob again attacked Belcher's ships, and this time they "broke into his warehouses looking for corn, and shot the lieutenant governor when he tried to interfere."

== See also ==
- List of food riots
