= 2008 Egyptian general strike =

Strike by Egyptian textile workers due to low wages and high food costs

The 2008 Egyptian general strike was a strike which occurred on 6 April 2008, by Egyptian workers, primarily in the state-run textile industry, in response to low wages and rising food costs. Strikes are illegal in Egypt and authorities have been given orders to break demonstrations forcefully in the past. The strike took place just two days before key municipal elections.

== Lead-up ==
Using Facebook, blogs, SMS, independent media and word-of-mouth, activists, and workers in Egypt sought to organize strikes, protests, and demonstrations throughout the country on April 6. Calling it the "Egyptian Intifida", supporters called for civil disobedience, asking everyone to stay home from work and avoid making purchases. The strike began as an initiative of the workers of El-Mahalla El-Kubra but was picked up, promoted, and expanded by activists using the Internet and cell phones. April 6 Youth Movement, a group on the social networking site Facebook, attracted more than 64,000 members. Although the banned Islamist organization the Muslim Brotherhood did not officially support the strike, it did not prevent its members from participating, and several Muslim Brotherhood activists and bloggers supported the strike. The night before Egyptian blogger Malek and three activists from the Islamic Labour Party were arrested for posting fliers about the strike.

The text of the call for strike read:

All national forces in Egypt have agreed upon the 6th of April to be a public strike. On the 6th of April, stay home, do not go out; Don’t go to work, don’t go to the university, don’t go to school, don’t open your shop, don’t open your pharmacy, don’t go to the police station, don’t go to the camp; We need salaries allowing us to live, we need to work, we want our children to get education, we need human transportation means, we want hospitals to get treatment, we want medicines for our children, we need just judiciary, we want security, we want freedom and dignity, we want apartments for youth; We don’t want price increases, we don’t want favouritism, we don’t want police in plain clothes, we don’t want torture in police stations, we don’t want corruption, we don’t want bribes, we don’t want detentions. Tell your friends not to go to work and ask them to join the strike.

== April 6: day of the strike ==
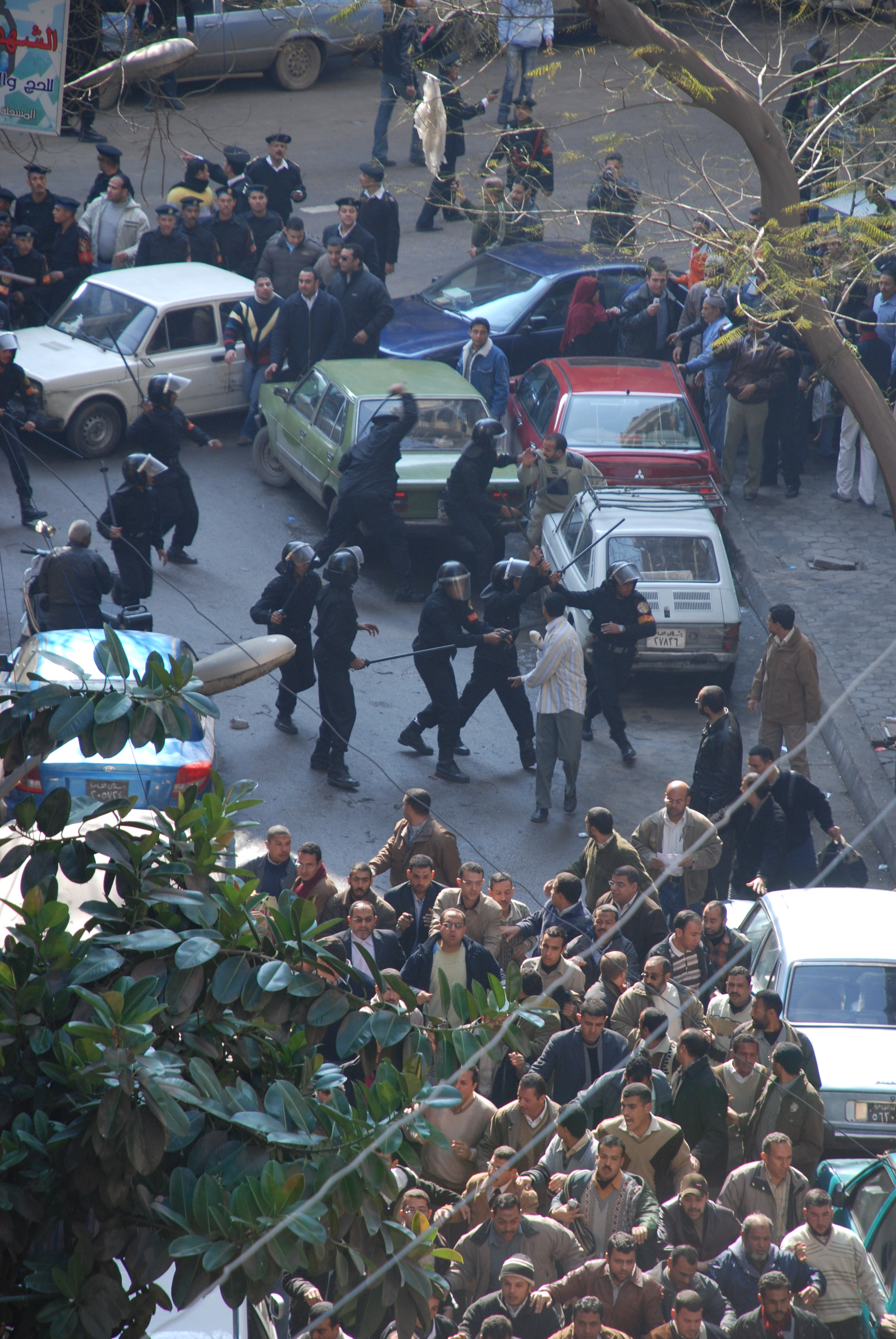
Security forces in Cairo beating protesters in 2008

The strike at Mahalla was to have begun at 7 a.m. but plainclothes security personnel and police infiltrated the factory and allegedly intimidated workers from striking. Hundreds of plainclothes security men took control of the Mahalla textile factories before work began, seizing workers and forcing them to work. At the end of the day, police escorts led small groups of workers out of the factories in an attempt to discourage mass protests. This led some in the press to call the strike a failure and many left the region (about an hour outside Cairo) before any violence started. Two people, including a 15-year-old-boy, were killed by Egyptian police, who used tear gas, rubber bullets, and live ammunition against the striking workers and other protesters. Several leaders of opposition parties have been detained, including the Kifaya coordinator Mohamed el-Ashqar, Freedom Commission Rapporteur of the Labor Party Mohamed Abdel Kodous, prominent activist and Kifaya member Magdy Qarqar, and blogger Sharkawy (who was sodomized and tortured by Egyptian police in 2006), and others.

Official media channels controlled by the Egyptian government discouraged citizens from participating in the strike, and law enforcement officials warned that protesters could be punished with three months to one year in jail. Thousands of police lined the streets in downtown Cairo near the universities and in Mahalla in attempt to intimidate people and prevent them from participating. There were no protests in Cairo's Tahrir Square (most likely due to strong police presence; at least some protesters were chased from the square by police), though students at Ain Shams, Helwan and Cairo universities held demonstrations. Many people did stay home in solidarity with the protesters and out of fear of possible violence, with the streets of Cairo noticeably quiet and more stores than usual shuttered for the day.

== See also ==
- 1977 Egyptian bread riots
