= Mary Jackson (Richmond bread riot) =

Organizer of the 1863 riots in Richmond, Virginia (1829–1870)

Mary Jackson (c. 1829 – c. 1870) was a Virginian peddler known for her role in organizing the 1863 riots in Richmond, Virginia, during the Civil War, now known as the Richmond Bread Riots. Jackson instigated and led a group of around 300 armed women through the streets of Richmond, demanding food and supplies that were in shortage during wartime. Although for the most part the violence was only threatened and not actually perpetrated, the armed mob did succeed in stealing thousands of dollars in goods as an expression of their frustration and desperation as the government failed to care for them while most of the men were fighting in the war.

== Biography ==
Mary Jackson was born around 1829. Varina Davis, the wife of Confederate president Jefferson Davis, described Jackson as a "tall, daring, Amazonian-looking" woman. A court reporter remarked in 1863 that Jackson was "an athletic woman of 40, with straight, strong features and a vixenish eye." Another court reporter described her as "a forty-year-old Amazon with the eye of the Devil." Although both court reporters stated that Jackson was 40 years old in 1863, many other accounts put her age at 34 years old at the time of the riot. Jackson lived in a working class suburb on Oregon Hill in the city until 1860, when she moved to a farm several miles west of the city. She lived with her husband, Elisha Jackson, who was 31 at the time and working as a painter, on Pine Street between Plank Road and Elm Street. Although Elisha was illiterate, he possessed $800 in property, and had even owned a slave when he and his wife lived within the city limits. The Jacksons had four children: one daughter and three sons. The eldest son was enlisted in the Confederate Army. Jackson frequently wrote to the War Office to petition for the discharge of her son from the army.

== Richmond Bread Riot ==
=== Background ===
The Richmond Bread Riots were born out of Confederate soldiers' wives grievances as women were forced to represent themselves in community appeals and communicate with government and generals. They have been described as an expression of women's mass political mobilization. Women turned vague promises from the state into practical workings for protection. Political development encouraged poor white women to affect change and take justice into their own hands as they fought with mill owners for yarn and food. Food riots and politics left women with direct action as mobs of disenfranchised women armed with revolvers, knives, and hatchets perpetrated 12 violent attacks on stores, government warehouses, army convoys, railroad depots, saltworks, and granaries just during March and April 1863. These highly organized, premeditated and disciplined appeals demonstrated class issues and the social frustrations of women amidst Civil War strife.

=== Planning and recruiting ===
Jackson began recruiting women for the riot on March 22, 1863, telling them in the market where she worked that there would be "a meeting of the women in relation to the high prices." She was open about her recruitment and used all of the urban and rural networks available to her. She primarily reached out to women in the market and to women working in a government clothing factory, but she also appealed to women in the countryside, including those in Henrico, Hanover, and New Kent counties. Jackson persuaded more than 300 women to show up at the Belvidere Baptist Church in Oregon Hill on April 1, 1863, for a meeting. Jackson asserted that, "the object of the meeting was to organize to demand goods of the merchants at government prices; and if they were not given, the stores were to be broken open and goods taken by force." The gathering was rowdy, but Jackson was clearly in control, according to observers. She walked up to the pulpit, where she delivered instructions on how the riot was to take place. She told the gathered women not to create a scene initially, but rather to walk quietly into the stores and demand supplies at government prices. She also insisted that the women were to demand an audience with the governor, John Letcher, to air their grievances. If their demands were not met, the women were to break open the stores and take the goods for themselves. She instructed the women to meet at 9:00 the next morning and to bring weaponry.

=== Riot ===
On the day of the riot, Jackson arrived at the market early in the morning but brought nothing to sell. She continued to openly recruit women to her cause, instructing a police officer that he had "better keep out of the street for today for the women intended to shoot down every man who did not aid them in taking goods", and brandishing weapons. Jackson also warned a clerk of the market and several other men that the women would demonstrate and seize edible goods, but the men did not take her seriously. A man overheard her violent threats against the city's merchants and she asked to borrow his pistol. She was seen leaving the market with a Bowie knife and a pistol.

By 8:00 am Jackson and a crowd of women had left the market. They walked to Capitol Square for another meeting and then traveled to the governor’s mansion to demand an audience with him. Visiting the governor's mansion to lay out their demands was a move calculated by Jackson to give their movement a sense of legitimacy, but also to make clear that they held the state government as responsible for their condition as they did the merchants. Accounts vary on what happened next. According to one version, Jackson and the other women barged into Letcher’s office and encountered an aide, Colonel S. Bassett French, who asked what they wanted. They reportedly responded that they "wanted bread, and bread they would have or die." French denied their requests. Other accounts report that Letcher did, in fact, meet with the women outside his mansion at the Washington monument. In either case, Jackson and her compatriots were dissatisfied with the governor's response to their demands.

One report indicates that, following the incident at his mansion, Governor Letcher gave a short and menacing speech, but the women were not intimidated and took to the streets. Richmond Mayor Joseph Mayo also spoke, reading the Riot Act to the mob, who ignored him. The crowd, numbering more than 300 women and including a growing number of men and boys, marched silently, per Jackson's instructions, up Ninth Street. The women were heavily armed, carrying both household implements and the contents of an old armory, including pistols, axes, knives, bayonets, and hatchets.

Once at the stores, they broke into open violence. They smashed shop windows using axes, held up the owners at gunpoint, took their goods, and loaded them onto stolen wagons in the street. One shopkeeper said that the mob took his entire supply in ten minutes, robbing him of 3,000 dollars of supplies, including 500 pounds of bacon. Jackson was closely involved in the rioting, leading a group of women and returning to her home before noon to retrieve a knife. One observer reported that Jackson directed an assault on John C. Page's shoe store at 93 Main Street midway through the riot. In total, at least twelve shops and warehouses were looted over the course of the riot. Ultimately, the public guard was called in, and the troops threatened to fire on the mob, which brought the riot to an end. One woman reportedly had four of her fingers cut off by a shopkeeper as she attempted to reach through his broken display window, but there are no other reports of bloodshed.

=== Aftermath ===
In the aftermath of the riot, many of the women involved were arrested. A number were captured as they attempted to drive the stolen wagons filled with goods back to their neighborhoods. Jackson was among those arrested. She was taken in around noon, found in the middle of a mob of women attempting to break into a store at First and Broad Street. At the time she was reportedly waving a Bowie knife and yelling "Bread or blood!" At her trial, a great deal of negative evidence, including the accusation that she speculated in beef, was presented. It was accompanied by a smattering of positive evidence at her initial trial in Mayor Mayo's police court, but bail was denied. This was despite the fact that her husband, Elisha, attempted to pay her bail, claiming to possess $7000 of real estate. On November 12, 1863, the Richmond Sentinel reported that Jackson was being tried for a misdemeanor because it could not be proven that she had actually stolen any goods.

== Death ==
Little is known about Jackson’s fate after her trial, largely because the circuit court records burned in a later fire. However, Jackson is believed to have died shortly after the end of the Civil War. An 1870 census shows a woman of a different name living with her husband in Brookland Township.
