= Mary Ann Jackson (illustrator) =

English botanical illustrator (1819–1915)

- Born: 1819; Woodstock
- Died: 1915
- Occupations: Botanical illustrator, author
- Spouse: Charles Chavasse
- Mother: Eleanor Sarah Benson
- Relatives: Edward White Benson

Mary Ann Jackson (1819–1915) was an English botanical illustrator, known only for two publications, now rare, copies of which are in various notable collections.

== Early life ==
Jackson was born in 1819 in Woodstock, Oxfordshire, England, to Ellen Sarah, formerly Benson and the Rev. Stephen Jackson, who was curate-in-charge at St Giles' Church, Sheldon, Warwickshire (now Birmingham). Her father died when she was nine, and she subsequently spent time at the Birmingham home of her maternal half brother, Edward White Benson (1802–1843), a fellow of the Botanical Society of Edinburgh, and his family, including his young son and namesake, Edward White Benson (1829-1896), who was later Archbishop of Canterbury.

== Career ==
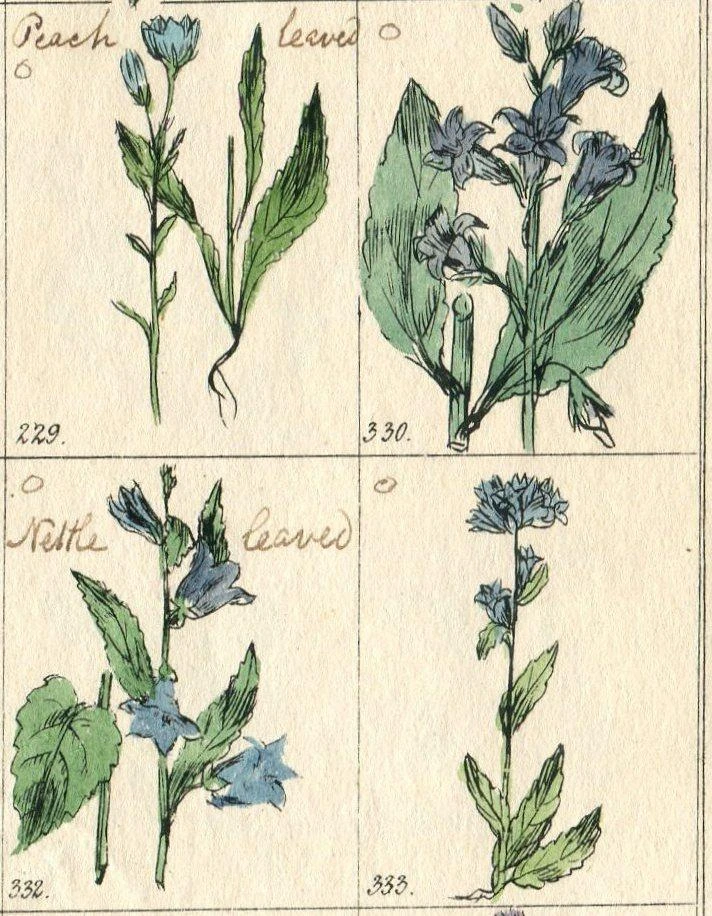
Illustrations 229, 330, 332 and 333 from the New York Public Library's copy of Jackson's The Pictorial Flora, depicting species of the genus Campanula. The hand-colouring may have been applied subsequent to publication; copies in other libraries are uncoloured.

Jackson's "Catalogue of some of the Rarer Species of Plants found in the Neighbourhood of Lichfield" was published with an introductory letter from Edward Benson, in The Analyst in 1837. Benson wrote:

...from Miss Jackson's extensive and minute acquaintance with our indigenous flora, implicit confidence may be placed in the accuracy of the list from Lichfield.

In 1840, crediting her only as "Miss Jackson", Longman, Orme, Brown, Green, and Longmans published The Pictorial Flora; or British Botany Delineated, a book comprising 131 plates with over 1,500 illustrations of native British flowering plants. Jackson created the lithographs herself. In a preface which she dated "Lichfield, March 1, 1839" she explained that the work was intended to serve as illustrations for floras by James Edward Smith, William Jackson Hooker, John Lindley and William Withering, and that the pages of her work had been sized so as to allow them to be cut and bound into those works. The preface also talked of the possibility of "continuing the series through Cryptogamia", but this never came to fruition.

On 6 December 1842 she married at St Mary's Church, Lichfield, surgeon Charles Allen Chavasse (1799-1863), a widower. They had one child, Charles Herbert Chavasse, in 1846. Her address was given as The Close, Lichfield.

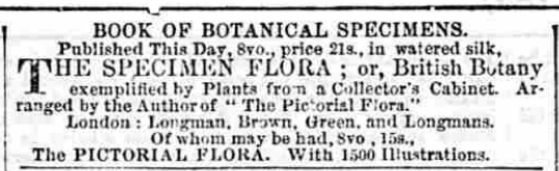
Press advert for The Specimen Flora, stated as "published this day", from the Morning Herald, 15 February 1847

Her final work The Specimen Flora: or, British Botany Exemplified by Plants from a Collector's Cabinet was published by Longman, Orme, Brown, Green, and Longmans in three volumes in 1847. On this occasion she was credited simply as "the author of The Pictorial Flora." The work was unusual in having pasted-in examples of pressed botanical specimens.

== Death and legacy ==
Jackson spent her final years in lodgings in Bristol. She died in 1915, having survived both her husband and son.

New York Public Library has a hand-coloured copy of Jackson's The Pictorial Flora, and two copies of The Specimen Flora, which they describe as "ultra rare", while an uncoloured copy of the former is also at the New York Botanical Garden. A copy of each of the two works is held by the Natural History Museum, London, which received The Specimen Flora as a donation in 1932.
