= Southern bread riots =

Civil unrest during the American Civil War

- Part of the American Civil War
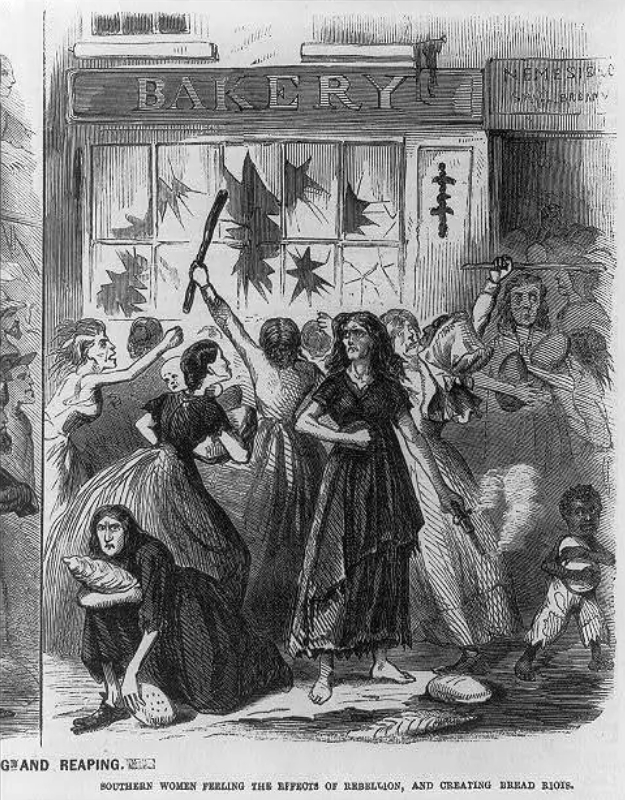
- Detail of a propaganda cartoon showing bread riots in Richmond, Frank Leslie's Illustrated Newspaper
- Date: March–April 1863
- Location: Confederacy
- Participants: Civilians, mostly women Confederate militia

The Southern bread riots were events of civil unrest in the Confederacy during the American Civil War, perpetrated mostly by women in March and April 1863. Though the Richmond riot was the largest, they occurred in cities throughout the Confederate States, with hungry women and men entering and looting various shops and stores.

By mid-1861, the Union naval blockade virtually shut down the export of cotton and the import of manufactured goods. Food that formerly came from more than a few hundred miles was largely cut off. By 1863 refugees had swollen the population of major Southern cities and severe food shortages depressed productivity and morale. Richmond, Virginia, the rebellion's national capital, was at the end of a long, vulnerable supply line. It became the main target of Union war effort, and starvation was a real threat. Food riots broke out. The Confederate Army was also affected, as its commanding general Robert E. Lee reported in January 1864: "Short rations are having a bad effect upon the men, both morally and physically. Desertions to the enemy are becoming more frequent, and the men cannot continue healthy and vigorous if confined to this spare diet for any length of time."

== Causes ==
The riots were triggered by the women's lack of money, provisions, and food. All were the result of multiple factors, mostly related to the Civil War:

- Inflation had caused prices to soar while incomes had not kept pace.
- Refugees had flooded the cities, causing severe shortages of housing and overwhelming the old food supply system. Richmond's population went from 38,000 people in 1860 to over 100,000 by 1863.
- Food supplies in rural areas were running short and less food was exported to cities; foraging armies, both Union and Confederate, ravaged crops and killed farm animals.
- Many cities—especially Richmond—were at the end of long supply lines, and internal transportation became increasingly difficult.
- Salt, which at the time was the only practical meat preservative, was very expensive (if available at all) because it was generally an imported item. The Union blockade prevented imports, and the capture of Avery Island, Louisiana, with its salt-mine, exacerbated the problem.
- The Confederate States Army seized provisions meant for civilian use to feed its soldiers, which in turn spurred farmers to withhold shipments.
- As shortages became more prevalent in urban areas, those who could afford to do so began to hoard what they could, exacerbating the shortages.

=== Timeline of Riots ===
Citizens, mostly women, began to protest the exorbitant price of bread. The protesters believed inaction from the government and speculators were to blame. To show their displeasure, many protesters turned to violence; with riots, including robberies of grocery and merchandise stores, happening on nearly a daily basis.

Listed below are both confirmed and unconfirmed riots:

- Atlanta (March 16, 1863)
- Salisbury, North Carolina (March 18, 1863)
- Mobile and High Point (March 25, 1863)
- (Unconfirmed) Raleigh, North Carolina (March 25, 1863)
- Petersburg (April 1, 1863)
- Richmond on (April 2, 1863)

== Richmond bread riots ==
After the Battle of Seven Pines (May 31 and June 1, 1862), incoming confederate soldiers, sex workers, and prisoners of war into Richmond only worsened the availability of supplies. Leading up to the riot, in March of 1863, poor weather conditions and flooding had prevented farmers from traveling and selling produce. The meeting with Governor John Letcher on April 1, 1863 and subsequent riot the next day, was believed to have been organized in late March in Oregon Hill by Mary Jackson, a peddler and the mother of a soldier, and Minerva Meredeth, a butcher's apprentice.

On April 2, 1863, in the Confederate capital of Richmond, Virginia, about 5,500 people, mostly poor women, after being denied the meeting with Governor John Letcher to seek relief amid food and fuel shortages, broke into shops and began seizing food, clothing, shoes, and even jewelry before the militia arrived to restore order. Tens of thousands of dollars' worth of items were stolen. There were no deaths and only a few were injured, but Virginia's armed forces made numerous arrests of both men and women.

President Jefferson Davis pleaded with the women and even threw them money from his pockets, asking them to disperse, saying "You say you are hungry and have no money; here, this is all I have". The mayor read the Riot Act; the governor called out the militia, and it restored order.

== Coverage ==
Prior riots were covered in local papers, often displaying approval of the soldiers' wives participants. To protect soldier morale, the Confederate government suppressed most news reports of the riot itself. As a result, multiple newspapers even reported the date of the Richmond riot incorrectly.

Many newspapers, however, did report on the trials of the participants themselves, and they usually portrayed those people in an unflattering light, suggesting that they were not actually starving, or that the rioters were mostly "Yankees" or lower-class people, allowing many upper-class citizens to ignore the scope of the problems. This was to create a barrier between the previous coverage of wealthy white women being contributive towards the war, and the poor-class who loot, "subvert[ing] the woman's war story."

Some reports focused solely on the looting of unnecessary items, not mentioning the mainly targeted items of food, suggesting ulterior motives, and referring to some of the "unworthy poor" as "subhuman, unsexed viragoes". However, that only served to deepen the feelings of resentment and injustice among the lower classes, leading to the sentiment that the Civil War was "a rich man's war, but a poor man's fight".

== Aftermath ==
In Richmond, measures were undertaken to alleviate starvation and inflation for poor people, and special committees were held to classify "worthy poor" from "unworthy poor"; the city then opened special markets for "worthy poor" citizens to purchase goods and fuel at significantly reduced prices. Historian Stephanie McCurry, who focuses on the American Civil War and Reconstruction, points out that the riots, though instigated through the poor-class, set in motion the expansion and intervention of welfare policies, particularly aimed at "protecting" the middle and planter-class white women. In doing so, the Confederacy was attempting to mend the previous veil of security and female support often displayed through media, one only allotted to middle and upper-class white women, that had begun to wear after years of war. Coinciding, the desertion rate of soldiers within the confederacy also grew.

== See also ==
- Economy of the Confederate States of America
- List of food riots
- List of incidents of civil unrest in the United States
