= Food riot =

Riot caused by shortages or unequal distribution of food

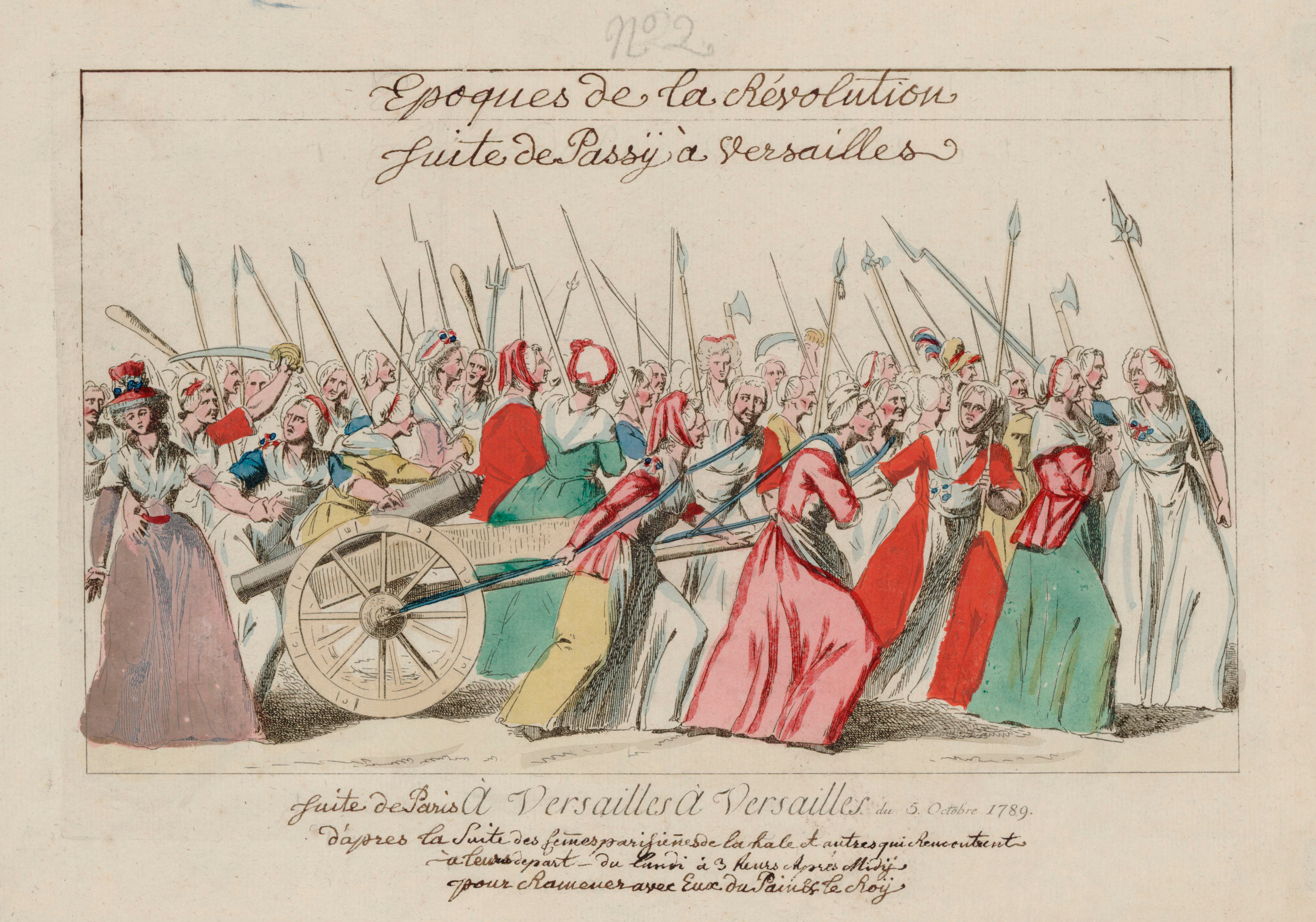
A contemporary illustration of the Women's March on Versailles, on 5 October 1789. The Women's March was a food riot in the Kingdom of France.

A food riot is a riot in protest of a shortage and/or unequal distribution of food. Historical causes have included rises in food prices, harvest failures, inept food storage, transport problems, food speculation, hoarding, poisoning of food, and attacks by pests.

Studies of food riots have found that they are often preceded by conditions of economic desperation, at which point members of the public may attack shops, farms, homes, or government buildings, in order to obtain staple foods such as bread, grain, or salt, as in the 1977 Egyptian bread riots. Historically, food riots are part of a larger social movement, such as the Russian Revolution or the French Revolution. Historically, women have been heavily involved in leading food riots; Food riots have thus served as a form of female political action even in societies without women's suffrage or other guaranteed political rights.

== Twenty-first century ==
During 2007–2008, a rise in global food prices led to riots in various countries. A similar crisis recurred in 2010–2011.

Due to a wheat crop failure in the mid-western United States because of drought in 2012, as well as simultaneous dryness during the start of the Russia's wheat season, a deficient monsoon rainfall in India and a drought in Africa's Sahel region, predictions were made for a possible outbreak of protests and riots akin to previous years. Yaneer Bar-Yam, the president of the New England Complex Systems Institute, said that computer modelling suggested an outbreak of instability, while he also blamed the use of corn for ethanol as exacerbating the problem. However, the director of trade and markets and the Food and Agriculture Organization, David Hallam, said that there was no imminent danger of such an outcome, though a worsening change in climate and government policies, such as export bans and panicked-buying, could trigger such a scenario. Oxfam added that a one percent increase in the price of food could lead to 16 million more falling below the poverty line. The International Food Policy Research Institute's Director-General Shenggen Fan suggested a global crisis could "hit us very soon. [Using corn for ethanol] actually pushed global food prices higher and many poor people, particularly women and children, have suffered."

Reports of events leading to the 2007–08 world food price crisis illustrate that it is challenging to find a single causal factor for food riots and highlights the need to multiple pre-emptive strategies to be adopted in different context given that food prices are said to remain volatile in the coming years. International commentators focusing on Africa have associated the riots with poverty and hunger hence the call to explore strategies to boost productivity and lower food prices. Yet on-the-ground reports highlight that the riots were driven by multiple factors coming together such as popular dissatisfaction with socioeconomic and political situation of the country and the availability of social media that helped rioters to mobilize. In this case some have called for broader structural changes to improve employment, equality and address social injustices.

In Venezuela, the steep fall in oil prices hit the economy hard in the 2010s. With a high rate of inflation (set to top 1,600% in 2017), the destruction of Venezuela´s industrial base has led to a famine in many parts of the country.

Protests in South Africa in July 2021 that initially began as a response to the arrest of former president Jacob Zuma quickly escalated into nationwide riots and looting of supermarkets and shopping malls. The expanded scope of the unrest, that had followed a record economic downturn and increasing unemployment from the COVID-19 pandemic, has been described as food riots.

== See also ==
- Food riots in the Middle East
- List of food riots
- Meat riots
- Southern Bread Riots
