= Lemrick Nelson =

Trinadadian man (born 1975)

Lemrick Nelson, Jr.
- Born: July 31, 1975 (age 51)
- Known for: Stabbing of Yankel Rosenbaum
- Criminal charges: Second-degree assault, resisting arrest and disorderly conduct (1995); Criminal trespassing (1996)
- Penalty: Aggravated assault and carrying a concealed weapon (1994; 120 days imprisonment and banishment from Georgia); Violation of civil rights (2003; 10 years imprisonment)

Lemrick Nelson, Jr. (born July 31, 1975) is a Trinidadian man who stabbed Hasidic student Yankel Rosenbaum to death during the racial unrest of the 1991 Crown Heights riot. Though his lawyer did not deny at his trial that Nelson stabbed Rosenbaum, he argued that the killing had nothing to do with Rosenbaum's being Jewish.

Nelson was arrested several times on unrelated charges over the following years. In a third trial for Rosenbaum's murder, Nelson was convicted of violating Rosenbaum's civil rights in the murder, and served a 10-year sentence. Nelson admitted for the first time at his 2003 trial that he had stabbed Rosenbaum.

== Early life ==
Nelson is the son of immigrants to the United States from Trinidad, Lemrick Nelson Sr. (formerly a baker) and his former wife, Valerie Evans. According to information presented by his lawyers in 1995, Nelson had a troubled childhood. His mother, who reportedly suffered from mental illness, repeatedly tried to abort him before he was born. As an infant, he lived with his mother at a shelter for battered women. Nelson's earliest memories involved a physical altercation between his father and mother. Eventually, his mother abandoned him when he was 18 months old. Nelson was identified as a "youngster at risk" in elementary school. He had poor motivation, disrupted classes, and did poorly academically.

Nelson was interviewed and tested in November 1994 by psychologists Dr. Naftali Berrill, and Dr. Ife Landsmark. Both rated his I.Q. as low average to average, while Landsmark noted a high-average score in a language-free test. The doctors characterized his symptoms as those of a conduct disorder without any significant psychopathology.

== Killing of Yankel Rosenbaum ==
=== Events of August 19–20, 1991 ===
After seven-year-old Guyanese boy, Gavin Cato was accidentally struck and killed by an automobile in the motorcade of a prominent Hasidic rabbi on August 19, 1991, some Black residents of Crown Heights rioted. Shortly after the riot began, a group of 12–20 young Black men, with the incitement of Charles Price, who chanted "Let's go get a Jew," surrounded Yankel Rosenbaum, a 29-year-old Australian University of Melbourne graduate student who was in the United States conducting doctoral research. Nelson stabbed Rosenbaum in the back and was apprehended by police a short time later. Before being taken to the hospital, Rosenbaum identified Nelson as the person who had stabbed him.

Rosenbaum died from internal bleeding at Kings County Hospital. His medical treatment at the hospital was the subject of later litigation: doctors failed to notice one of Rosenbaum's four stab wounds for almost an hour.

=== Murder trial (1992) ===
Nelson was tried on charges of murder as a hate crime in a New York state court in 1992. Nelson pleaded not guilty to the charge and denied stabbing Rosenbaum.

Police testified that Nelson had confessed to murdering Rosenbaum to police officers. Prosecutors claimed Nelson had been carrying a blood-stained knife inscribed with the word "KilleR" at the time he was arrested, but Nelson's defense denied the knife was his and suggested police officers had found it elsewhere. No evidence of fingerprints on the knife was presented. Despite media reports that the pants Nelson had been wearing at the time of his arrest had been bloody, prosecutors did not present evidence of bloodstains upon Nelson's clothing.

Nelson was acquitted of murder on October 29, 1992. The racial composition of the jury (which was considered relevant in the context of the racially charged atmosphere) is unclear: some contemporary reports described the jury as having consisted of six black jurors, four Hispanic jurors and two white jurors. Later reports described the jury as having consisted of eight black jurors, two white jurors and two Guyanese Americans of undisclosed race or as being "predominantly black". It was claimed that after conclusion of the trial, some jurors attended a party hosted by Nelson's lawyer which honored Nelson as a "hero".

=== Violation of civil rights trials (1997 and 2003) ===
In 1997, Nelson and Price were both convicted in federal court of violating Rosenbaum's civil rights resulting in his death. After the judge ruled that the two men had committed second degree murder, Nelson was sentenced to nearly 20 years in prison, while Price was sentenced to nearly 22 years in prison. However, that verdict was vacated on appeal due to unfairness in the jury selection process. A retrial was held in 2003. There were two primary issues of contention: whether Nelson's actions had been motivated by prejudice and whether Nelson's actions caused Rosenbaum's death.

In a departure from his position in the 1992 trial, Nelson admitted to having stabbed Rosenbaum and apologized to Rosenbaum's family for his actions. However, he denied his actions had been motivated by prejudice, claiming he had joined the mob because he was intoxicated and "caught up in the excitement". Prosecutors claimed that Nelson had admitted he had attacked Rosenbaum only after hearing Price shout "Let's get the Jew!" Rosenbaum's family claimed videotapes showed that Nelson was not intoxicated and claimed the mob of which Nelson was a member had shouted: "There's a Jew, let's get the Jew."

On the issue of whether Nelson caused Rosenbaum's death, medical evidence was presented indicating that Rosenbaum had been stabbed four times, of which two of the wounds were fatal.

On May 14, 2003, the jury found Nelson guilty of violating Rosenbaum's civil rights, but he was not found to have caused Rosenbaum's death. According to Cornell law professor Sherry Colb, the jury's verdict was "logically incoherent". Rosenbaum's family had filed a malpractice suit against the hospital where he died. The jury was supposed to—but did not—ignore this information in determining Nelson's guilt, reasoning that the hospital and Nelson could not both be guilty. Colb writes that "this line of reasoning can most generously be described as misguided and less generously as stupid."

Nelson was subsequently sentenced to the maximum sentence of ten years' imprisonment. He served the full sentence (including time served before his 2003 trial) and was released from prison on June 2, 2004. In a May 2010 interview with the New York Post, Nelson indicated that he had stopped drinking; he said he considered stabbing Rosenbaum a "mistake" he made as "a kid".

In 2002, Charles Price pleaded guilty to civil rights charges resulting in Rosenbaum's death. He was sentenced to 11 years and six months in prison. He was released from prison on November 4, 2009.

=== Political and social reaction ===
According to New York Magazine, Nelson's initial acquittal fueled anger at Mayor David Dinkins, with Dinkins becoming "a surrogate for Lemrick Nelson", in part because of Dinkins's support for the verdict, saying "I have no doubt that in this case the criminal-justice system has operated fairly and openly." According to Edward Shapiro, professor of history at Seton Hall University, "it is possible that David Dinkins would have been re-elected mayor in 1993 had the jury not exonerated Lemrick Nelson on October 29, 1992." Shapiro has called the riot "the most serious anti-Semitic incident in American history".

== Other incidents ==
After being acquitted of Rosenbaum's murder in 1992, Nelson moved to a suburb of Atlanta, Georgia, to live with a half-sister.

=== Aggravated assault and weapon charges (1994) ===
Nelson was charged in January 1994 with aggravated assault for slashing Erik Heard, a high school classmate, since Heard had reported to school officials that Nelson had stolen money from another classmate. When he was arrested on March 5, 1994, Nelson was also charged with carrying a concealed weapon (a scalpel).

He pleaded guilty and was convicted on both charges in DeKalb County Superior Court in Decatur, Georgia, in March 1995. He was sentenced to 90–120 days (of which he served 120 days) and three years' probation, and was banished from the State of Georgia.

The United States Court of Appeals for the Second Circuit also noted that Nelson was expelled from school as a result of the incident, and physically resisted arrest.

=== Disorderly conduct, resisting arrest, and harassment charges (1995) ===
After spending approximately two years in Georgia, Nelson returned to the New York area in 1994. He lived with his mother in New Jersey, and his father in Crown Heights.

In the early hours of June 23, 1995, Nelson and five other men were gathered outside an apartment building on Schenectady Avenue in Crown Heights. Police approached the men after receiving a complaint call and one man was summonsed for possession of marijuana. Nelson was subsequently arrested and charged with second-degree assault, resisting arrest and disorderly conduct.

On arraignment, police claimed that Nelson had pushed and punched an officer who had asked him for identification and attempted to search him, causing the officer to fall and sprain his wrist. Nelson's attorney claimed that the police officers had harassed and assaulted Nelson by beating him on the head with a flashlight.

A warrant was issued for his arrest, which was deemed a parole violation.

=== Criminal trespass arrest (1996) ===
Nelson was charged with criminal trespass on February 8, 1996. Police claimed that, having left a court hearing 90 minutes previously, Nelson was arrested after refusing to leave the lobby of an apartment building in which he did not live and that he was carrying a box cutter at the time.

=== Attack with icepick (2010) ===
On September 12, 2010, Nelson was stabbed in the head with an icepick in a possible road rage incident. He was found outside his car at 168th Street and Riverside Drive in upper Manhattan after 2:00 a.m., and brought to Harlem Hospital Center in stable condition.
