= Neil H. Buchanan =

American economist, legal scholar, and professor

- Born: Neil Harold Buchanan; April 20, 1959 (age 67); Hartford, Connecticut
- Education: Vassar College, A.B. in Economics; Harvard University, A.M. and Ph.D. in Economics; University of Michigan Law School, J.D.; Monash University, Ph.D. in Laws
- Occupations: Economist, Legal Scholar, Professor of Law
- Employers: Institute for Austrian and International Tax Law (Vienna University of Business and Economics); The University of Florida Levin College of Law

Neil Harold Buchanan is an American economist, legal scholar, and professor. He is currently a Senior Research Fellow at Institute for Austrian and International Tax Law (Vienna University of Business and Economics), specializing in tax policy and tax law, and a professor emeritus at University of Florida Levin College of Law.

== Early life ==
Buchanan was born on April 20, 1959, in Hartford, Connecticut, United States. He received his A.B. in Economics from Vassar College in 1981. He then received his PhD in Economics and his A.M. in Economics from Harvard, where he also spent time teaching undergraduate courses and working at think-tanks.

== Career ==
After starting his career as an economics professor, Buchanan changed directions and received his J.D. from University of Michigan's Law School in 2002. Then in 2017, he received his second Ph.D. in Laws with a specialization in public policy from Monash University in Melbourne. From 2002 to 2003, Buchanan was a judicial clerk for the United States Court of Appeals for the Tenth Circuit in the chambers of Judge Robert H. Henry in Oklahoma City.

Buchanan's research focuses on the long-term tax and spending patterns of the federal government. Buchanan and his co-author, Michael C. Dorf of Cornell Law School, do research on the U.S. debt ceiling, especially its constitutional implications, and the 12th Amendment regarding the 2024 US Presidential Election.

Buchanan has been a full-time faculty member in the Economics departments of Wellesley College, Goucher College, and the University of Wisconsin at Milwaukee. He has been a visiting or adjunct professor at the University of Utah, the University of California at Berkeley, Towson University, Bard College, and Barnard College. He served on the faculty at Rutgers University Law School, and was a visiting professor at New York University School of Law and a visiting scholar at Cornell Law School. Buchanan taught at The University of Florida Levin College of Law, specializing in tax policy and tax law, until late 2023, when he moved to Toronto. According to reporting by the New York Times, the "final straw" that caused Buchanan to leave the University of Florida Levin College of Law for Toronto was policies initiated by Florida Governor Ron DeSantis creating "a review process for tenured faculty, which he viewed as the end of academic freedom."
