= Emanuel V. Towfigh =

German legal scholar (born 1978)

Emanuel V. Towfigh (born 1978) holds the Chair in Public Law, Empirical Legal Research and Law & Economics at EBS Law School and is Professor for Law & Economics at the EBS Business School. He served as the Law School’s Dean from 2018 to 2020. Since August 2021 he holds the position of Distinguished Scholar in Residence at Peking University School of Transnational Law.

== Career ==
Towfigh studied Law as well as Economics at the University of Münster, Germany and at Nanjing University, China. He obtained his doctoral degree at the University of Münster in 2006. Subsequently, he was a Senior Research Fellow at the Max Planck Institute for Research on Collective Goods (2007-2016), a Global Fellow and Hauser Research Scholar at New York University Law School (2011/12) and a Visiting Professor of Law at the University of Virginia Law School (2012/13).

His research includes work on Comparative Constitutional Law, Democracy, Political Parties, Law and Religion, (Behavioral) Law & Economics and Empirical Legal Studies.

Since 2016, Towfigh is one of the Editors-in-Chief of the German Law Journal, and helped transition the Journal over to Cambridge University Press where it is published since 2019.

Towfigh was an elected member of the Junge Akademie at the Berlin-Brandenburg Academy of Sciences and Humanities (BBAW) and the German National Academy of Sciences Leopoldina (2011-2016), and Member/Speaker of the Board (2014-2016). He has been a member of the Supervisory Board of the Freudenberg Group since 2008.

== Publications ==
=== Books ===
- Economic Methods for Lawyers, Edward Elgar International Academic Publisher, Cheltenham 2015 (joint work with Niels Petersen et al.)
- Das Parteien-Paradox. Ein Beitrag zur Bestimmung des Verhältnisses von Demokratie und Parteien [The Paradox of the Parties. A Contribution to Defining the Relationship Between Democracy and Political Parties], Mohr Siebeck, Tübingen 2015

=== Journal articles ===
- Hyde, Andrew; Miller, Russell A.; Towfigh, Emanuel V. (September 2020). "Making Open Access Viable Economically". German Law Journal. 21 (6): 1129–1133. doi:10.1017/glj.2020.75.
- de Puiseau, Berenike Waubert; Glöckner, Andreas; Towfigh, Emanuel V. (May 2019). "Integrating theories of law obedience: How utility-theoretic factors, legitimacy, and lack of self-control influence decisions to commit low-level crimes". Judgment and Decision Making. 14 (3): 318–334. doi:10.1017/S1930297500004368.
- Towfigh, Emanuel V.; Goerg, Sebastian J.; Glöckner, Andreas; Leifeld, Philip; Llorente-Saguer, Aniol; Bade, Sophie; Kurschilgen, Carlos (April 2016). "Do direct-democratic procedures lead to higher acceptance than political representation?: Experimental survey evidence from Germany". Public Choice. 167 (1–2): 47–65. doi:10.1007/s11127-016-0330-y.
- Towfigh, Emanuel V. (October 2016). "Rational Choice and Its Limits". German Law Journal. 17 (5): 763–778. doi:10.1017/S2071832200021453.
- Towfigh, E. V. (1 July 2014). "Empirical arguments in public law doctrine: Should empirical legal studies make a 'doctrinal turn'?". International Journal of Constitutional Law. 12 (3): 670–691. doi:10.1093/icon/mou039.
- Towfigh, Emanuel; Glöckner, Andreas (August 2011). "GAME OVER: Empirical support for soccer bets regulation". Psychology, Public Policy, and Law. 17 (3): 475–506. doi:10.1037/a0023402. hdl:11858/00-001M-0000-0028-6FB2-8.
- Engel, Christoph; Beckenkamp, Martin; Glöckner, Andreas; Irlenbusch, Bernd; Hennig-Schmidt, Heike; Kube, Sebastian; Kurschilgen, Michael; Morell, Alexander; Nicklisch, Andreas; Normann, Hans-Theo; Towfigh, Emanuel (March 2014). "First impressions are more important than early intervention: Qualifying broken windows theory in the lab". International Review of Law and Economics. 37: 126–136. doi:10.1016/j.irle.2013.07.005. hdl:11858/00-001M-0000-0028-6CB3-9.
- Glöckner, Andreas; Towfigh, Emanuel; Traxler, Christian (November 2013). "Development of legal expertise". Instructional Science. 41 (6): 989–1007. doi:10.1007/s11251-013-9266-5.
- Towfigh, Emanuel (March 2012). "Old Weimar Meets New Political Economy: Democratic Representation in the Party State". German Law Journal. 13 (3): 237–258. doi:10.1017/S2071832200020484. hdl:11858/00-001M-0000-0028-6FB0-C.
