= Lassner =

Lassner is a surname. Notable people with the surname include:

- Andy Lassner (born 1966), American television producer
- David Lassner (born 1954), American computer scientist and academic administrator
- Jacob Lassner, American academic and writer

== See also ==
- Lasser
