= Catherine Sharkey =

American lawyer

- Born: 1970 (age 55–56)
- Education: Yale University (BA, JD); Magdalen College, Oxford (MSc)
- Employer: New York University School of Law
- Known for: Tort law, empirical legal studies
- Title: Crystal Eastman Professor of Law

Catherine Moira Sharkey (born 1970) is an American professor of law at the New York University School of Law.

== Biography ==
In 1992, Sharkey graduated with a bachelor's degree in Economics from Yale University, summa cum laude, where she was tapped for Skull and Bones. She went on to Magdalen College, Oxford as a Rhodes scholar, graduating in 1994 with a master of science in Economics for Development, with honors and with distinction. Catherine then attended Yale Law School, where she was an Executive Editor of the Yale Law Journal, graduating with a J.D. in 1997.

After law school, Sharkey clerked for judge Guido Calabresi of the United States Court of Appeals for the Second Circuit, and then for justice David Souter of the United States Supreme Court from 1998 to 1999.

In 2007, she joined the faculty at NYU School of Law, and is currently the Crystal Eastman Professor of Law. Her scholarship focuses on torts, punitive damages, class actions, remedies, products liability, administrative law, and empirical legal studies. Previously, she taught at Columbia Law School and practiced as an appellate litigation associate at Mayer Brown in New York.

She is a member of both the American Law Institute and Administrative Conference of the United States.

Sharkey is occasionally mentioned as a potential future United States Supreme Court nominee.

== Selected publications ==
- ———; Epstein, Richard A. (2012). Cases and materials on torts. New York: Wolters Kluwer Law & Business. ISBN 978-0-7355-9992-5.
- ——— (2012). "Inside Agency Preemption". Michigan Law Review. 110 (4): 521–595. JSTOR 23216793.
- ——— (2009). "Federalism Accountability: 'Agency-Forcing' Measures". Duke Law Journal. 58 (8): 2125–2192. JSTOR 20684789.
- ——— (2003). "Punitive Damages as Societal Damages" (PDF). Yale Law Journal. 113 (2): 347–453. doi:10.2307/3657525. JSTOR 3657525.

== See also ==
- List of law clerks for the third seat of the Supreme Court of the United States
