= Eduardo Peñalver =

American legal academic

49th President of Georgetown University
- Incumbent
- Assumed office July 1, 2026
- Preceded by: John J. DeGioia

22nd President of Seattle University
- In office July 1, 2021 – March 31, 2026
- Preceded by: Stephen Sundborg
- Succeeded by: Maura Mast

16th Dean of Cornell Law School
- In office July 1, 2014 – January 1, 2021
- Preceded by: Stewart J. Schwab
- Succeeded by: Jens David Ohlin

Personal details
- Born: Eduardo Moises Peñalver
- Education: Cornell University (BA); Oriel College, Oxford (BA); Yale University (JD)

Eduardo Moises Peñalver is an American legal scholar who has been the 49th president of Georgetown University since July 1, 2026. He was previously the 22nd president of Seattle University from July 2021 to March 2026 and the 16th dean of Cornell Law School from 2014 to 2021.

== Early life and education ==
Peñalver was raised in Puyallup, Washington. His family is Catholic. His mother is the child of Swiss immigrants and worked as a school nurse, and his father immigrated from Cuba and worked as a pediatrician. He has four siblings.

Peñalver received his primary education at his parish school, All Saints, and attended Henry Foss High School in Tacoma, Washington. He received a Bachelor of Arts from Cornell University, and a Bachelor of Arts and a promoted Master of Arts from Oriel College, Oxford, where he was a Rhodes Scholar. He received a Juris Doctor degree from Yale Law School.

Peñalver clerked for Judge Guido Calabresi of the United States Court of Appeals for the Second Circuit, and Justice John Paul Stevens of the U.S. Supreme Court.

== Career ==
Peñalver began his academic career at the Fordham University School of Law in 2003. In 2006, Peñalver joined the faculty at Cornell Law School and was a visiting professor at both Harvard Law School and Yale Law School. He moved to the University of Chicago Law School in 2012, where he served as the John P. Wilson Professor of Law.

He is an expert on property and land use law as well as the intersection of law and religion. He has authored, co-authored or edited five books on property including Property Outlaws, examining the role of disobedience in the development of property law, and An Introduction to Property Theory.

From 2014 to 2021, Peñalver was the Allan R. Tessler Dean of Cornell Law School, succeeding Stewart J. Schwab. He was the first person of Latin descent to become dean of an Ivy League law school.

He became the 22nd president of Seattle University in 2021, becoming the first layperson to lead the Catholic institution. As president, Peñalver oversaw the university's acquisition of the Cornish College of the Arts in 2024.

On October 15, 2025, Georgetown University announced that Peñalver would become the university's 49th president, succeeding president John DeGioia and interim president Robert Groves. He took office on July 1, 2026. He is the second layperson to lead the Catholic institution.

== Personal life ==
Peñalver married Sital Kalantry, whom he met at Cornell, in 1997. They have two sons.

== Publications ==
=== Books ===
- Peñalver, Eduardo; Katyal, Sonia (2010). Property Outlaws: How Squatters, Pirates, and Protesters Improve the Law of Ownership. Yale University Press. ISBN 9780300122954.
- Peñalver, Eduardo; Alexander, Gregory, eds. (2010). Property and Community. Oxford University Press. ISBN 978-0195391572.
- Peñalver, Eduardo; Sterk, Stewart (2011). Land Use Regulation. Foundation Press. ISBN 978-1599418742.
- Peñalver, Eduardo; Alexander, Gregory (2012). An Introduction to Property Theory. Cambridge University Press. ISBN 978-0521113656.
- Singer, Joseph William; Berger, Bethany; Davidson, Nestor; Peñalver, Eduardo (2021). Property Law: Rules Policies & Practices (8th ed.). Aspen. ISBN 978-1543838534.

=== Scholarly publications ===
- Exactions Creep, 2013 S. Ct. Rev. 287 (2014) (with Lee Fennell)
- The Right Not to Use in Patent and Property Law, 98 Cornell L. Rev. 1437 (2013) (with Oskar Liivak)
- The Illusory Right to Abandon, 109 Mich. L. Rev. 191 (2010)
- Regulatory Taxings, 105 Colum. L. Rev. 2182 (2004)

=== Opinion writing ===
- "The Obscure Case That Could Blow Up American Civil-Rights and Consumer-Protection Laws", The Atlantic, March 25, 2021 The Obscure Case That Could Blow Up American Civil-Rights and Consumer-Protection Laws
- "Remembering Justice Ginsburg", Cornell Chronicle, Sept. 2020, Peñalver: Justice, Justice Shall You Pursue – Remembering Justice Ruth Bader Ginsburg ’54 | Cornell Chronicle

== See also ==
- List of law clerks for the fourth seat of the Supreme Court of the United States
- List of presidents of Georgetown University
