= Sital Kalantry =

American law professor

- Education: Cornell University (AB); London School of Economics (MSc); University of Pennsylvania Carey Law School (JD)
- Occupation: Law professor
- Years active: 2021–present
- Employer(s): Seattle University School of Law (Associate Dean, Professor of Law); Cornell Law School (Clinical Professor of Law); University of Chicago Law School (Clinical Professor of Law)
- Website: skalantry.com

Sital Kalantry is an American legal scholar specializing in comparative law and international human rights. She is a professor of law at the Seattle University School of Law. Kalantry is the author of Court on Trial: A Data-Driven Account of the Indian Supreme Court (2022), and Women’s Human Rights and Migration: Sex-Selective Abortion Laws in the United States and India (2017).

== Early life and education ==
Kalantry was born in India and emigrated to the United States at the age of four. She grew up in Queens, New York, and attended the Bronx High School of Science.

She earned an AB degree from Cornell University, an MSc from the London School of Economics, and a JD from the University of Pennsylvania Carey Law School.

== Career ==
Kalantry is a Professor of Law and Associate Dean at Seattle University School of Law. Before joining Seattle University, she taught at Cornell Law School for 15 years, where she directed the International Human Rights Clinic. She has also held visiting faculty positions at the University of Chicago Law School and Yale Law School.

In 2012, Kalantry was a Fulbright-Nehru Senior Research Scholar at O.P. Jindal Global University in India, where she conducted research on the Indian Supreme Court.

Kalantry has been involved in founding several academic centers and clinics, including the Roundglass India Center at Seattle University, the Avon Center for Women and Justice at Cornell Law School, and the International Human Rights Clinic at University of Chicago Law School. Earlier in her career, she practiced corporate law at Milbank and O’Melveny & Myers.

== Awards ==
- South Asian Bar Association Public Interest Award (2021)
- Kheel Family Award for Excellence in Teaching, Cornell Law School (2019)
- 2018 Eric Hoffer Book Award for Best Academic Press Title for Women's Human Rights and Migration (University of Pennsylvania Press, 2017)

== Publications ==
=== Books ===
- Court on Trial: A Data-Driven Account of the Indian Supreme Court (Cambridge University Press, 2022)
- Women’s Human Rights and Migration: Sex-Selective Abortion Laws in the United States and India (University of Pennsylvania Press, 2017)

=== Selected articles ===
- “Sex Selection in the United States and India: A Contextualist Feminist Approach” – UCLA Journal of International Law and Foreign Affairs (2013)
- “The Intent-to-Benefit: Individually Enforceable Rights under International Treaties”– Stanford Journal of International Law (2007)

== Personal life ==
Kalantry is married to Eduardo Peñalver, president of Georgetown University.
