= Quill and Dagger =

Honor society at Cornell University

- Founded: May 28, 1893; 133 years ago Cornell University
- Type: Senior society
- Affiliation: Independent
- Status: Active
- Scope: Local
- Chapters: 1
- Headquarters: Ithaca, New York, U.S. United States

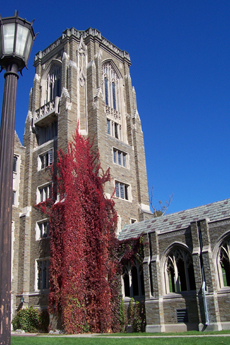
Quill and Dagger Tower on Cornell University's West Campus

Quill and Dagger is a senior honor society at Cornell University in Ithaca, New York. It was founded in 1893 for men only, but later began admitting women. In 1929, The New York Times stated that election into Quill and Dagger constituted "the highest non-scholastic honor within reach of undergraduates."

== History ==
Quill and Dagger was founded as a secret society at Cornell University on May 28, 1893. It seeks to recognize exemplary undergraduates at Cornell University who have shown leadership, character, and dedication to service. In 1929, The New York Times stated that membership in Quill and Dagger was "the highest non-scholastic honor within reach of undergraduates."

Quill and Dagger's meetings and proceedings in Lyon Hall are closed, and the society's contributions and activities on campus are typically concealed. However, it became open with regards to its members in 1899. Membership remained secret for a brief period after its founding, but the names of newly tapped members are published in The Cornell Daily Sun each semester. At times, newly elected members were also published in The New York Times. Quill and Dagger has also published its minutes from 1900 to 1950 and an occasional membership directory.

It was the first Ivy League society to open its membership to women.

== Symbols ==
The society's name originates from the expression "the pen is mightier than the sword". The Quill and Scroll gold badge is the head of a corpse, holding a quill in its mouth, impaled by a dagger with black enamel on its handle.

Members of the society have been responsible for numerous campus traditions, ranging from Cornell songs "Give My Regards to Davy," "Strike Up a Song," and "Fight for Cornell" to the Lynah Rink cowbell cheer.

== War Memorial ==
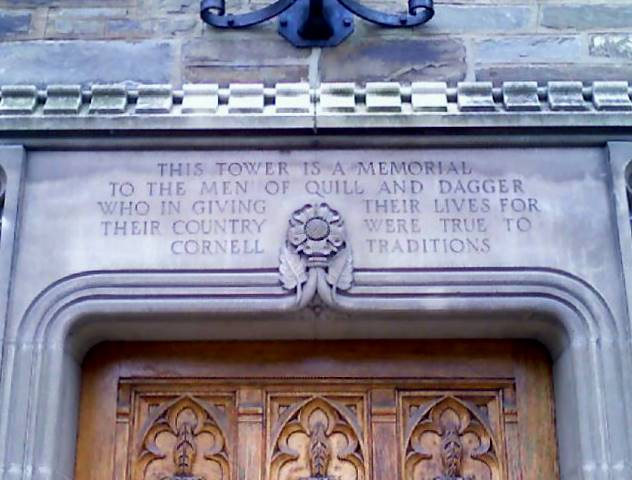
War Memorial Inscription

Beginning in 1925, Quill and Dagger members spearheaded the erection of a permanent memorial to Cornellians who served in the First World War. Based on the suggestion of F. Ellis Jackson, a Quill and Dagger member, the architectural plan for West Campus was modified to include the War Memorial structure. Funds for its construction were raised from alumni by a committee chaired by Robert E. Treman, also a society member. The War Memorial was dedicated on May 23, 1931, with a national radio address by President Herbert Hoover. It was erected in remembrance of the 264 Cornellian casualties and nearly 9,000 Cornellians who served during the war. It is the largest of several tributes to military service and sacrifice at Cornell University.

Because of Quill and Dagger's contributions to the war memorial's construction, the society was granted exclusive use of the top floors of the northern tower. The inscription above the entrance to the building reads, "This tower is a memorial to the men of Quill and Dagger who in giving their lives for their country were true to Cornell traditions." The mural in the first-floor War Memorial Shrine also prominently depicts a quill and a dagger, although official descriptions discuss their meaning as a palm and a sword.

The war memorial structure is filled with symbolism relevant to the society and its ideals. The east and west sides of the Tower depict four historic variations of a cross: the Latin cross, Saint Andrew's Cross, swastika, and Maltese cross. These four symbols have varying heraldic, religious, and secular meanings, including loyalty, piety, bravery, martyrdom, humility, and sacrifice. They are also connected with historic chivalric orders such as the Knights Hospitaller and Knights Templar. The south side of the tower depicts an ankh, which symbolizes life or the power to give and sustain life. Next to the ankh is a menorah, whose light has traditionally represented knowledge or enlightenment.

== Membership ==
Undergraduates are selected for membership in Quill and Dagger after May 1 of their junior year or during the fall of their senior year. Those who served the Cornell community, as well as those who received graduate degrees from Cornell, are eligible to be chosen as honorary members. Receiving an undergraduate degree from Cornell is not a requirement for honorary membership.

== Notable members ==
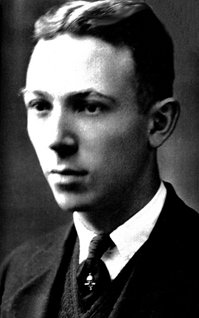
Author E. B. White with Quill and Dagger Pin

Quill and Dagger's membership is published in The Cornell Daily Sun each semester. Some notable members of Quill and Dagger include Sandy Berger, Adolph Coors III, Ken Dryden, Drew Nieporent, Leah Ward Sears, E. B. White, Paul Wolfowitz, and John Zimmer. Notable honorary members include Edward Leamington Nichols and Ernest Wilson Huffcut, who graduated from Cornell University before the society was founded, and Janet Reno and Ruth Bader Ginsburg, who graduated before the society accepted women. Names of Quill and Dagger members can be found on buildings throughout campus. At least one member of the society served in the United States Congress between 1913 and 1984.

== See also ==
- Collegiate secret societies in North America
- Honor society
