= Valerie Hans =

American legal scholar and psychologist

- Citizenship: American
- Education: University of California, San Diego (BA), University of Toronto (MA, PhD)
- Occupation: Legal scholar
- Employer: Cornell Law School

Valerie Hans is an American legal scholar and psychologist. She is the Charles F. Rechlin Professor of Law at Cornell Law School and has been the editor of the Annual Review of Law and Social Science. Trained as a social scientist, her major areas of study are the jury system, jury reform, and the application of social science to law.

== Education ==
Hans holds a BA in psychology from the University of California, San Diego (1973), an MA (1974) and a PhD (1978) in social psychology from the University of Toronto.

== Career ==
Hans' area of study is on the jury system, conducting social science-based empirical studies on legal decision making, particularly focusing on jury decisions. She has authored or edited seven books and written scholarly publications that are listed among the highest rated in terms of scholarly impact.

Hans serves as a co-editor for the Journal of Empirical Legal Studies and was the president of the Law and Society Association for a two-year term beginning in June 2015. She was awarded the group's Stan Wheeler Mentorship Award in 2012.

Hans has appeared as a commentator in news publications and programs on the jury system and juror behavior during prominent public trials such as the Boston Marathon bombing trial of Dzhokhar Tsarnaev, and other prominent cases.

== Publications ==
=== Selected books authored or edited ===
- Hans, Valerie; Robbennolt, Jennifer (2015). The Psychology of Tort Law. New York: NYU Press. ISBN 9781479814183.
- Hans, Valerie; Vidmar, Niel (2007). American Juries: The Verdict. New York: Prometheus Books. ISBN 978-1591025887.
- Hans, Valerie (2006). The Jury System: Contemporary Scholarship. Hampshire, England: Ashgate Publishing, Ltd. ISBN 978-0754625049.
- Hans, Valerie (2000). Business on Trial: The Civil Jury and Corporate Responsibility. New Haven: Yale University Press. ISBN 978-0300082067.
- Hans, Valerie; Vidmar, Neil (1986). Judging the Jury. New York: Plenum Press. ISBN 978-0738205748.

=== Selected publications ===
- Hans, V. P.; Blume, J. H.; Eisenberg, T.; Hritz, A. C.; Johnson, S. L.; Royer, C. E.; Wells, M. T. (2015). "The death penalty: Should the judge or the jury decide who dies?". Journal of Empirical Legal Studies. 12: 70–99. doi:10.1111/jels.12065. S2CID 155520969.
- Hans, V. P. (2014). "Reflections on the Korean jury trial". Journal of Korean Law. 14: 81–115.
- Hans, V. P. (2014). "The impact of victim participation in Saiban-in trials in Japan: Insights from the American jury experience". International Journal of Law, Crime and Justice. 42 (2): 103–116. doi:10.1016/j.ijlcj.2013.07.002.
- Hans, V. P. (2014). "What's it worth? Jury damage awards as community judgments". William & Mary Law Review. 55: 935–969.
- Hans, V. P. (2012). "What difference does a jury make?". Yonsei Law Journal. 3: 36–54.
- Johnson, S.L.; Blume, J.; Eisenberg, T.; Hans, V.P.; Wells, M. T. (2012). "The Delaware death penalty: An empirical study". Iowa Law Review. 97: 1925–1964.
- Hans, V. P.; Reyna, V. F. (2011). "To dollars from sense: Qualitative to quantitative translation in jury damage awards". Journal of Empirical Legal Studies. 8: 120–147. doi:10.1111/j.1740-1461.2011.01233.x. S2CID 678343.
