= Stephen Sundborg =

American Jesuit and theologian

Fr Stephen V. Sundborg SJ
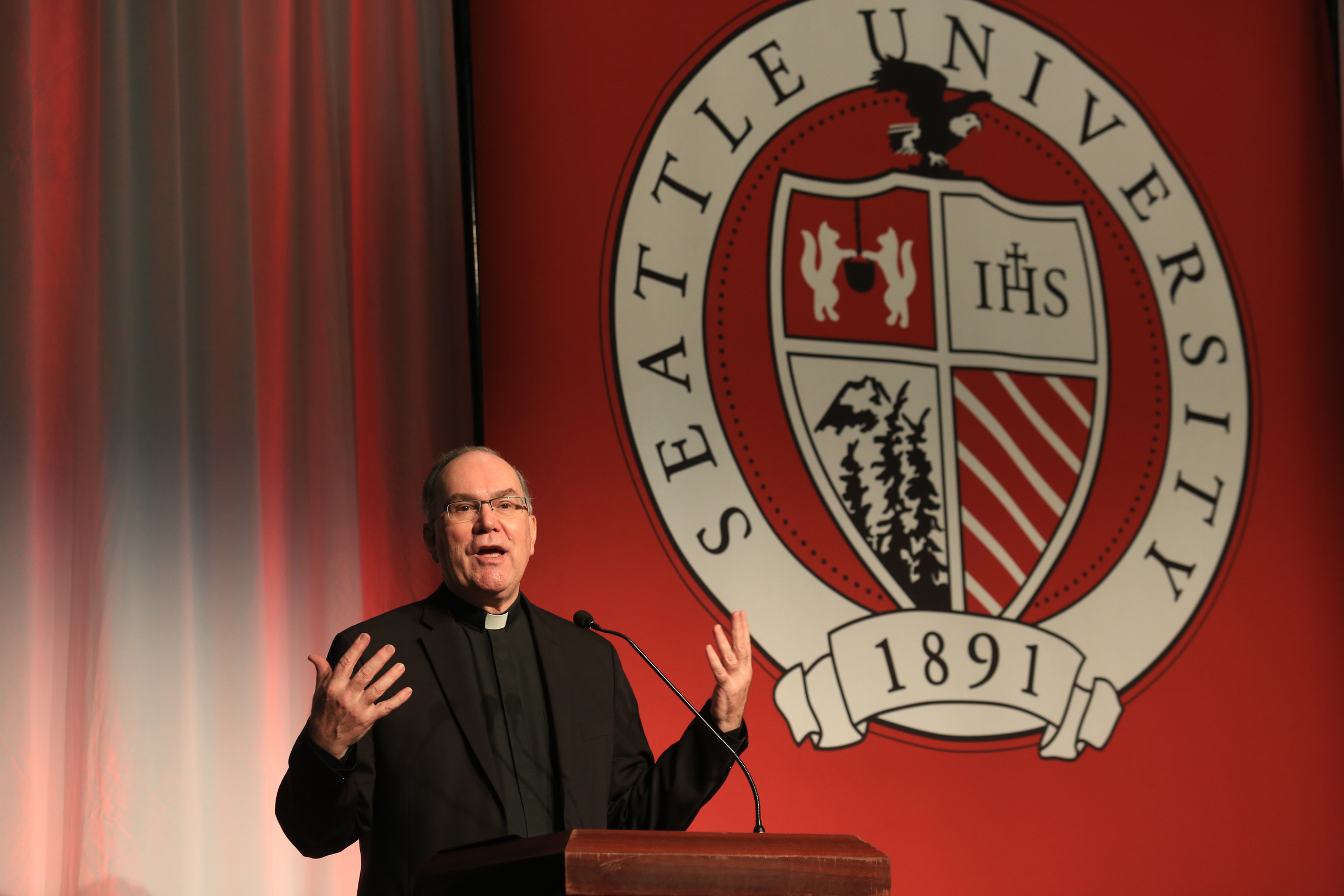

21st President of Seattle University
- In office July 1997 – July 1, 2021
- Succeeded by: Eduardo Peñalver

Interim President of Seattle University
- In office April 1, 2026 – August 31, 2026

Chancellor of Seattle University
- Incumbent
- Assumed office July 1, 2024

Personal details
- Born: August 3, 1943 (age 83) Portland, Oregon
- Education: Gonzaga University (BA, MA); Pontifical Gregorian University (STD)
- Profession: Jesuit priest, theologian, academic administrator

Stephen Vincent Sundborg, S.J. (born August 3, 1943) is an American Jesuit and theologian. He served as the 21st President of Seattle University from July 1997 to July 2021, Interim President from April 2026 to September 2026, and is currently serving as Chancellor as of July 2024.

== Life and career ==
Sundborg was raised in the Territory of Alaska. His father, George Walter Sundborg (1913-2009), was a newspaper reporter and editor, and longtime assistant to Ernest Gruening when Governor and U.S. Senator from the new State of Alaska. George Sundborg was a delegate to the Alaska State Constitutional convention in 1955–56, where, as Chairman of the Committee on Style and Drafting, he was responsible for selecting most of the words in that document.

Stephen Sundborg entered the Society of Jesus in 1961 and was ordained a Roman Catholic Jesuit priest in 1974 in Seattle. In 1982, he obtained a doctorate in spirituality from the Pontifical Gregorian University in Rome. He taught theology at Seattle University from 1982 until 1990, when he was appointed the Provincial of the Northwest Jesuits, a position he held until 1996. Sundborg also served as the rector of the Jesuit community at Seattle University beginning in 1986.

In July 1997, Sundborg became the 21st President of Seattle University. He became well known around campus as "Father Steve," a nickname used by all at SU. In 2017 the Trustees appointed him to another 5-year term. In 2019 he notified the Trustees of his hope to retire in 2021.

On June 30, 2021, Sundborg retired from the Presidency of Seattle University. His 24 years as president set a longevity record among all presidents of colleges and universities then serving in the State of Washington. He has been given a full year of complete freedom, and in 2021 is traveling the United States and Europe. In mid-2022, his Jesuit Northwest Province superior will give him a new assignment. Steve, now only 78, says he is ready for one more challenge before full retirement.

Sundborg was succeeded by Eduardo Peñalver as the President of Seattle University on July 1, 2021. Penalver is the first non-Jesuit President of the university.

== Planned Parenthood controversy ==
In October 2019, Seattle University removed references to Planned Parenthood as a student resource from its website, after anti-abortion group Students for Life of America sent a letter to Sundborg and other university leaders in August 2019 arguing that Planned Parenthood had "no place on a Christian campus" as an "abortion corporation". An excerpt from Sundberg's email response to the request to remove references to Planned Parenthood:

Thank you for contacting me about this matter. Please excuse my delay in responding to you. I am helped by learning what you bring to my attention about instances of Planned Parenthood on our website. As a Catholic university this subject of importance to us. Our policy is that it not be listed as a resource for any Seattle University-sponsored department or club. The listing for the Students of Concern Resources will be removed. We have made sure in the past that there are no referrals listed to Planned Parenthood, so it is good to learn one as occurred contrary to our policy.

Sundborg also "refused an in-person interview when approached by Spectator reporters on Oct. 3 and refused a phone interview with The Spectator on Oct. 4 or over the weekend". Sundborg issued a statement responding to the controversy, reading in part:

Respect for the sanctity and dignity of life is an issue of paramount importance to people across faiths, including the Catholic Church. As such, it is an issue which is important to Seattle University.

There are strong-held views on both sides when it comes to the issue of abortion. Whether we agree or disagree, I believe it is important to be respectful of all viewpoints. I respect those who may disagree with the decision I made several years ago not to include on our website referrals to Planned Parenthood, whose position on abortion runs counter to the stance of Catholic institutions, schools and universities like Seattle University. This approach is consistent with our history prior to the existence of the university website and I believe it is an approach that is consistent with most, if not all, Catholic institutions.

Seattle University has long held the view that university policies, practices and procedures are to be administered in a manner consistent with the university’s Catholic and Jesuit identity and character.

On October 9, 2019, Sundborg sent an email message to the Seattle University Community with additional statements about his decision, which read in part:

I am writing to you at this time in regard to the decision that I made as president about not listing referrals to Planned Parenthood on the SU website, while respecting the academic freedom of our faculty to engage our students in thoughtful and scholarly pursuits in their respective disciplines.

First, I want to let you know how deeply I care about decisions that have an impact on any person in our campus. I made this decision, consistent with my own and other presidents’ previous practice, in my responsibility to publicly represent our university as Catholic and in reflecting the central teaching of the Catholic Church regarding abortion—specifically as a significant moral issue and not any other services provided by Planned Parenthood. The decision I made was based on my policy as president that faculty and staff should have the personal and academic freedom to associate with Planned Parenthood but that the university and its offices and divisions will not formally endorse the organization.

I realize this has had many ramifications and impacted many persons of our community of students, faculty and staff. I want to assure you that in making this decision I am not judging anyone in regard to their personal choices. I will seek to more fully articulate the rationale of my decision at a later time when I have a chance to give it further consideration.
