= Duncan Hollis =

American legal scholar

Duncan Hollis is an American legal scholar and the Laura H. Carnell Professor of Law at Temple University’s Beasley School of Law known for his expertise on treaties and the application of international law to cyberspace. He has been a prominent advocate for a new treaty to regulate States' behavior on-line and establishing an international legal duty to assist victims of significant cyberattacks.

== Early life and education ==
Hollis was born in 1970 and grew up in Easton, Massachusetts, graduating from Bowdoin College in 1992. He received a M.A.L.D. from The Fletcher School at Tufts University and a J.D. from Boston College Law School in 1996, where he served as Executive Editor of the Boston College Law Review and finished first in his class.

== Career ==
Hollis began his legal career in 1996 at Steptoe & Johnson before joining the Office of the Legal Adviser at the U.S. Department of State in 1998. While at the State Department, he worked as the attorney-advisor for Treaty Affairs and then advised the Bureau of Oceans, International Environmental and Scientific Affairs. He also served as U.S. counsel in litigation before the International Court of Justice in both the Avena case and the Oil Platforms case. He earned Superior Honor Awards for his work on the Oil Platforms case as well as for negotiating an agreement on the implementation of the Montreal Protocol for the Protection of the Ozone Layer. In 2004, Hollis began teaching at Temple University Beasley School of Law. At Temple, he worked as the Associate Dean for Academic Affairs from 2011 to 2018.

Hollis has authored or edited multiple books, including The Oxford Guide to Treaties, which won a book award from the American Society of International Law in 2013; the textbook International Law with Allen Weiner and Chimene Keitner; and Defending Democracies: Combatting Foreign Election Interference in a Digital Age with Jens David Ohlin. Hollis has also co-authored several articles with political scientist Martha Finnemore exploring the construction of norms in cyberspace and the rising practice of states accusing each other of launching malicious cyber operations.

Together with Oxford University Professor Dapo Akande, Hollis is co-convenor of the Oxford Process on International Law Protections in Cyberspace, which published a Compendium of its work in 2022. Until 2024, he was a non-resident scholar at the Carnegie Endowment for International Peace. In 2022, he was appointed to serve as a member of the U.S. Department of State's Advisory Committee on International Law.

From 2016 to 2020, Hollis served as an elected member of the OAS’s Inter-American Judicial Committee where he led projects on establishing the IAJC Guidelines on Binding and Non-Binding Agreements and improving the transparency of State views on international law's application to cyberspace. Hollis also served as an Adviser to the American Law Institute in its drafting the Fourth Restatement on the Foreign Relations Law of the United States. Hollis was a contributor and remains a board member emeritus of the first international law blog, Opinio Juris (blog).

Hollis's scholarship and expertise on treaties and interpretation have been cited by all three branches of the U.S. government as well as multiple international institutions. Supreme Court Justice Stephen Breyer repeatedly relied on Hollis' comparative work in his dissenting opinion in the Medellín v. Texas case. Hollis has also served as an expert witness in various investor-state dispute settlement proceedings and regularly consults with governments and companies such as Microsoft on questions of international law and international relations.

== Personal life ==
Hollis married Emily Lentz in 1996, and has 3 children. He is the son-in-law of author and professor Perry Lentz.
