= Cornell International Law Journal =

- Discipline: International law
- Language: English
- Edited by: Editor-in-Chief: Maria Giovanna Jumper Executive Editor: Ammar Inayatali Managing Editor(s): Kaitlyn M. Greening, Lydia Mackey, William C. Stone Senior Editor(s): Matthew O. Dutton, Victoria Choi Admissions Editor(s): Amit Avram Symposium Editor(s): Run by Committee

Publication details
- History: 1967-present
- Publisher: Cornell Law School (United States)
- Frequency: Quarterly

Standard abbreviations
- Bluebook: Cornell Int'l L.J.
- ISO 4: Cornell Int. Law J.

Indexing
- ISSN: 0010-8812

Links
- Journal homepage

The Cornell International Law Journal is one of the oldest international law journals in the United States. It was founded in 1967 by members of the Cornell Society of International Law at Cornell Law School. The Journal is published four times a year and hosts a symposium every spring in Ithaca, New York. In addition to the print edition, the Journal also published an online-version in paginated PDF format.

== Overview ==
The Journal has published articles and commentaries by scholars including:

- E. Allan Farnsworth,
- Geoffrey C. Hazard Jr.,
- Rudolf B. Schlesinger,
- Roger C. Cramton,
- S. K. B. Asante,

as well as notable politicians such as:

- Bill Clinton,
- John F. Kerry,
- George J. Mitchell,
- Orrin G. Hatch,
- Max Baucus;

and other well known people, such as:

- former Supreme Court Justice Sandra Day O'Connor;
- former U.S. Secretary of State James A. Baker III;
- Major General Barry Ashton, Deputy Commander of United Nations forces in Croatia 1993–94;
- the Rt. Hon. Lord Gordon Slynn of the United Kingdom's High Court of Justice;
- Judge Johann Kriegler of the Constitutional Court of South Africa.
