= Lasser =

Lasser or Lässer is a Germanic surname; it may refer to:

- David Lasser (1902–1996), American science fiction author
- Franz-Josef Lässer (born 2001), Austrian para-cyclist
- Louise Lasser (born 1939), American actress
- Mitchel Lasser, American lawyer
- Philip Lasser (born 1963), American composer, music theorist and pianist
- Robin Lässer (born 1991), German motorcycle racer
- Tobías Lasser (1911–2006), Venezuelan botanist
