= Sherry Colb =

American law professor (1966–2022)

- Born: 3 May 1966; New York City
- Died: 25 August 2022 (aged 56); Ithaca, New York
- Occupation: Legal scholar
- Spouse: Michael C. Dorf

Sherry F. Colb (3 May 1966 – 25 August 2022) was an American legal scholar who served as the inaugural C.S. Wong Professor of Law at Cornell Law School from 2019 until her death in 2022. She was best known for her scholarship on gender equality and animal rights.

== Early life and education ==
Colb was born on May 3, 1966, in New York City. Her parents, Clara and Ben-Zion Colb, were both Holocaust survivors. After graduating from Ramaz High School, she received a bachelor's degree in psychology from Columbia University; she was valedictorian of the graduating class at both institutions. She then enrolled at Harvard Law School, where she graduated magna cum laude. While studying for her law degree, she also attended the University of Southern California because her husband, Michael C. Dorf, was working in Los Angeles, California at the time.

== Career ==
After graduating from law school, Colb worked as a law clerk, first for Judge Wilfred Feinberg of the United States Court of Appeals for the Second Circuit, and later for Supreme Court Justice Harry Blackmun. In 1993, she joined the faculty of Rutgers Law School, initially as an assistant professor; she later gained tenure and became the Judge Frederick Lacey Scholar there. In 2008, she left Rutgers to join the faculty of Cornell, where she served as the Charles Evans Hughes Scholar before being named the inaugural C.S. Wong Professor of Law in 2019.

In 2016, Colb attended a panel to debate animal rights and law hosted by the Association of American Law Schools by the Section on Animal Law in New York City. Colb co-authored Beating Hearts: Abortion and Animal Rights with Michael C. Dorf in 2016. Colb advocated for ethical veganism, commenting that there are no good reasons to kill animals for food as people can easily meet all of their nutritional needs on a plant-based diet. Colb argued that sentient fetuses have the right not the be harmed or killed but there is no moral concern to abort pre-sentient fetuses. Colb stated that pre-sentient fetuses lacking consciousness are "somethings, not someones". They cannot be harmed because prior to sentience, there is no someone to be harmed.

Jens Ohlin commented that Colb "trained a generation of lawyers to think ethically and critically about important issues... She consistently spoke out against injustice wherever it might be found, whether against human beings or nonhuman animals".

== Personal life and death ==
Colb became a vegan in 2006. She had breast cancer surgery in 2006 and for a different cancer in 2019 which returned in metastatic form in 2021. On August 25, 2022, Colb died at her home in Ithaca, New York, at the age of 56. She was survived by her husband, Michael C. Dorf, as well as by their two daughters, Meena Colbdorf and Amelia Colbdorf.

== Selected publications ==
- Colb, Sherry (2014). Mind If I Order The Cheeseburger?: And Other Questions People Ask Vegans. Lantern Books. ISBN 978-1590563847.
- Colb, Sherry; Dorf, Michael C (2016). Beating Hearts: Abortion and Animal Rights. Columbia University Press.
- Colb, Sherry (2021). "Subject of a Death". Cornell Law Review Online. 205: 205–230.
- Colb, Sherry; Dorf, Michael C (2022). "Animal Rights: From Why to How". Animal Law Review. 22: 225–248.
