= Robert C. Hockett =

American lawyer and professor

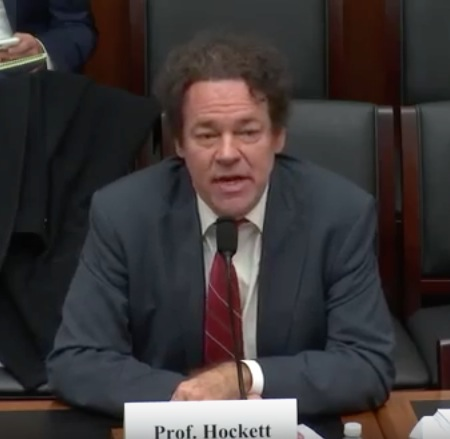
- Hockett testifying before U.S. House Financial Services Committee, November 2015
- Education: University of Kansas (BA, JD); Oxford University (MA); Yale Law School (LLM, JSD)
- Known for: Lawyer, law professor, and policy advocate
- Scientific career
- Fields: Law, Public economics
- Workplaces: Cornell University

Robert C. Hockett is an American lawyer, law professor, and policy advocate. He holds two positions at Cornell University (the Edward Cornell Professor of Law at Cornell Law School and a Professor of Public Affairs), is senior counsel at investment firm Westwood Capital, LLC, and was a Fellow at The Century Foundation think tank.

== Career ==
Hockett earned his B.A. and J.D. degrees from the University of Kansas where he was also selected as a Rhodes Scholar. His prelegal background is in philosophy, finance, and economics. While at Oxford he earned a Master's in Philosophy and Economics and later earned LL.M. and J.S.D. degrees from Yale University. Hockett also served as a law clerk for Judge Deanell Reece Tacha, Chief Judge of the United States Court of Appeals for the Tenth Circuit.

He has been a member of the Cornell Law School faculty since 2004, and became the Edward Cornell Professor of Law in 2014. In 2016 he became Cornell University Professor of Public Affairs. Since 2012, Hockett has been a Fellow with the Century Foundation. Hockett is also an adjunct professor at Georgetown University McDonough School of Business in the MBA program.

Hockett is an originator and long-term advocate of proposals to use eminent domain to purchase mortgages with negative equity from private label securitization trusts in order to write down mortgage debt for homeowners whose homes are worth less than their mortgage loans. According to Saule Omarova, Hockett worked with her in 2015 in coming up with the idea for a "National Investment Authority".

Much of his recent work has been on interlinkages between economic inequality, private debt, and financial and political fragility. His forthcoming book in this connection, A Republic of Owners, is on capital-spreading policies and programs aimed at increasing the share of average Americans' incomes deriving from business capital rather than labor. It was scheduled for publication by Yale University Press in 2017.

== Political activities ==
During the presidential primary season of 2015–16, Hockett served as a spokesperson for the Bernie Sanders campaign. He has advised Congresswoman Alexandria Ocasio-Cortez regarding the Green New Deal.

On February 8, 2019, Hockett appeared on the Fox News program Tucker Carlson Tonight to discuss the Green New Deal plan championed by Ocasio-Cortez.

== Selected publications ==
- Bretton Woods 1.0: An Essay in Constructive Retrieval (2013) (New York University Journal of Legislation and Public Policy)
- The Way Forward, New America Foundation (2011) (with Daniel Alpert & Nouriel Roubini)
- The Debt Goes On: A Post-Crisis 'Progress Report,' Federal Reserve Bank of St. Louis (2016)(with Daniel Alpert)
- Recursive Collective Actions Problems: the Structure of Procyclicality in Financial and Monetary Markets, Macroeconomies and Formally Similar Contexts (2017) (Cornell)
- A Republic of Owners (2017) (forthcoming from Yale University Press)
- The Capital Commons: Digital Money and Citizens' Finance in a Productive Commercial Republic (2019) (Review of Banking & Financial Law)
- The Democratic Digital Dollar (2019) (Harvard Business Law Review)
- Digital Greenbacks: A Sequenced TreasuryDirect and FedWallet plan for the Democratic Digital Dollar (2021) (Journal of Technology Law & Policy)
- Spread the Fed: Distributed Central Banking in Crisis and Beyond (2024, Palgrave Macmillan)
- Making Capital Democratic (2025) (Polity Press)
- Global Money (2026) (forthcoming from Yale University Press)
