= Perry Lentz =

American novelist (born 1943)

Perry Carlton Lentz (born March 27, 1943, in Anniston, Alabama) is an author and professor emeritus of English language and literature at Kenyon College in Gambier, Ohio.

== Early life and education ==
The son of Lucian Boyd Lentz, a sales executive, and his wife, Adelaide Carleton Sterne, Perry Lentz attended Kenyon College, and was a member of Delta Kappa Epsilon, graduating with his Bachelor of Arts in English in 1964, summa cum laude with Highest Honors in English. He went on to Vanderbilt University, where he earned his master's degree in 1966 and his PhD in 1970. He married Jane Anderson in 1965; they have two children, Robin Lentz and Emily Hollis, and six grandchildren, Amos, Etta, and Piper DeMartino, and Abraham, Margaret, and Arlo Hollis. His son-in-law is legal scholar Duncan Hollis.

== Academic career ==
As a graduate student, Lentz served as a teaching fellow at Vanderbilt University between 1964 and 1969. In 1969, he returned to Kenyon College, where he has spent his entire career, being appointed assistant professor of English in 1969, associate professor in 1973, and then full professor. He was subsequently appointed to an academic chair, McIlvaine Professor of English, and has served as chairman of the English Department.

He was a Woodrow Wilson Fellow in 1964 and held a Rockefeller Foundation grant in 1971. In 1978–79, he was visiting professor at Exeter University in England, where he established a joint program with Kenyon. Lentz was twice awarded Trustee Teaching Excellence Award, in 1992 and 2009.

In honor of his distinguished tenure and teaching excellence, Kenyon College opened the Lentz House for its Department of English in 2009. Lending his name to the new English building places Lentz in the ranks of other highly distinguished Kenyon faculty, such as John Crowe Ransom, for whom Ransom Hall, Kenyon's Admissions building, was renamed in 1958. In a video uploaded to the Vlogbrothers YouTube channel, author John Green, whom Lentz taught at Kenyon, listed Lentz's "Instruction Booklet" as one of his most valuable books.

== Published works ==
- The Falling Hills, New York, Scribner, [1967]; Columbia : University of South Carolina Press, [1993].
- It Must Be Now the Kingdom Coming: An Historical Romance, New York, Crown [1973].
- Private Fleming at Chancellorsville: The Red Badge of Courage and the Civil War, Columbia: University of Missouri Press, [2006].
- Perish From the Earth [2008]

== Sources ==
- Who's Who
- Contemporary Authors
