= Saule Omarova =

Kazakh-American attorney and academic

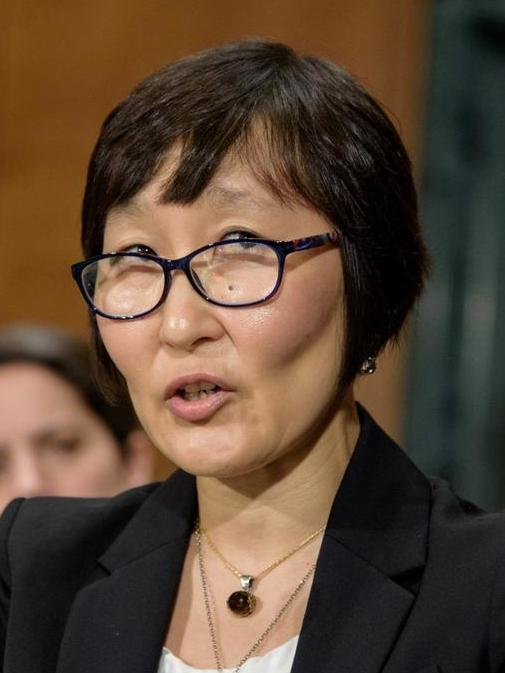
- Omarova in 2018
- Born: November 2, 1966 (age 59); Uralsk, Kazakh SSR, Soviet Union (now Oral, Kazakhstan)
- Education: Moscow State University (BA); University of Wisconsin–Madison (MA, PhD); Northwestern University (JD)

Saule Tarikhovna Omarova (Russian: Сауле Тариховна Омарова, Säule Tarihqyzy Omarova, Kazakh Cyrillic: Сәуле Тарихқызы Омарова; born November 2, 1966) is a Kazakh-American attorney, academic, and public policy advisor. She was the nominee for comptroller of the currency before her nomination was withdrawn at her request on December 7, 2021.

Omarova is the Earle Hepburn Professor of Law at the University of Pennsylvania Carey Law School, where her work focuses on financial regulation, corporate governance, and the political economy of finance. Omarova previously served as an advisor within the United States Department of the Treasury. She is a Senior Berggruen Fellow at the Berggruen Institute in Los Angeles and a senior fellow at the Roosevelt Institute.

== Early life and education ==
Omarova was born in the West Kazakhstan Region of the Kazakh Soviet Socialist Republic, where she studied at Oral's School No. 21 before moving to Moscow in 1984. Omarova graduated from Moscow State University in 1989.. Her thesis was titled Karl Marx’s Economic Analysis and Theory of Revolution in the Capital.

Omarova moved to the United States in 1991 "with one suitcase and a fifty-dollar bill in my pocket". She received a Ph.D in political science from the University of Wisconsin–Madison (UW), and a Juris Doctor from Northwestern University Pritzker School of Law. At UW, Omarova defended her thesis, The Political Economy of Oil in Post-Soviet Kazakhstan.

== Career ==
Omarova practiced law in the Financial Institutions Group of New York-based law firm Davis Polk & Wardwell for six years. During the George W. Bush Administration, Omarova served in the Department of the Treasury as a special advisor on regulatory policy to the Under Secretary for Domestic Finance. During her time as an associate professor of law at the University of North Carolina at Chapel Hill, Omarova testified as a witness at a U.S. Senate hearing on bank ownership of energy facilities and warehouses.

Omarova joined Cornell Law School in 2014. She was professor of law and public affairs from July 2014 to June 2019 and was named the Beth and Marc Goldberg Professor of Law in June 2019. In 2025, she joined the faculty of the University of Pennsylvania Carey Law School as the Earle Hepburn Professor of Law.

=== OCC nomination ===
In August 2021, Omarova's name was floated as a potential contender to lead the Office of the Comptroller of the Currency (OCC) under President Joe Biden. She was chosen to serve as comptroller of the currency in September 2021, pending Senate confirmation. Omarova's nomination was endorsed by Senator Elizabeth Warren, who stated she would be a "fearless champion for consumers" in the role if confirmed. Her nomination was criticized by credit unions and bank lobbyists.

Her confirmation hearings occurred before the Senate Banking Committee on November 18, 2021. Republicans were critical of her 2021 paper "The People's Ledger" in which Omarova proposed that the Federal Reserve should provide consumer banking services. Her confirmation hearing drew controversy, with Senator Patrick Toomey characterizing some of her views as "extreme leftist ideas." Omarova's Kazakh origins were the subject of scrutiny from Republican lawmakers including Senator John Kennedy, who said to her, "I don't know whether to call you 'professor' or 'comrade,'" comments that drew rebukes from Democrats on the committee.

Omarova also faced opposition from several moderate Democratic Senators, including Jon Tester, Joe Manchin and Kyrsten Sinema. On December 7, 2021, the White House announced that Omarova had withdrawn her name from nomination.

== Policy positions ==
=== National Investment Authority ===
Omarova is noted for her support for a "National Investment Authority" (NIA), a proposal she has likened to New Deal-era programs. The proposal was first developed in 2015 in conjunction with Robert C. Hockett, a fellow professor of law at Cornell Law School. Omarova has stated that the NIA would be responsible for "devising, financing, and executing a long-term national strategy of economic development and reconstruction." In 2020, Omarova wrote a report for think tank Data for Progress, where she stated the "Green New Deal (GND) movement has successfully propelled [a] programmatic vision of an environmentally clean, just, and equitable future."

The proposed NIA would be made up of two components: a "National Infrastructure Bank" (NIB), as well as a National Management Corporation (which she nicknames "Nicki Mac"), which would serve to invest in green technologies. A 2020 article published in The New York Times reported that the proposed NIA would function in a manner similar to the Federal Reserve, and compared the NIA framework to the Reconstruction Finance Corporation created in 1932.

=== Federal Reserve reform ===
In a 2021 Vanderbilt Law Review article, "The People's Ledger: How to Democratize Money and Finance the Economy", Omarova proposed a comprehensive reform of the Federal Reserve's balance sheet, offering what she wrote was "a blueprint for democratizing both access to money and control over financial flows in the nation's economy." She called for the Federal Reserve to offer consumer bank accounts and become "the ultimate public platform for generating, modulating, and allocating financial resources in a modern economy," writing that the "radical reform outlined here is ultimately a more pragmatic and sensible response to the challenge of democratizing finance."

=== Financial regulation ===
According to a report by The New York Times, Omarova favors stricter regulations on cryptocurrencies and financial technology (fintech) companies. In response to reports that Facebook may launch its own cryptocurrency, Omarova argued it was an example of "Big Tech companies [resorting] to ever more creative ways to expand a monopolistic and extractive business model under the guise of corporate activism." In a paper by Omarova published in the Yale Journal on Regulation, "New Tech v. New Deal: Fintech as a Systemic Phenomenon" (2019), she argued that financial technology applications may amplify tensions and imbalances in financial markets and the broader economy, "render[ing] fintech a public policy challenge of the highest order."
