= Lynn A. Stout =

American corporate law scholar (1957–2018)

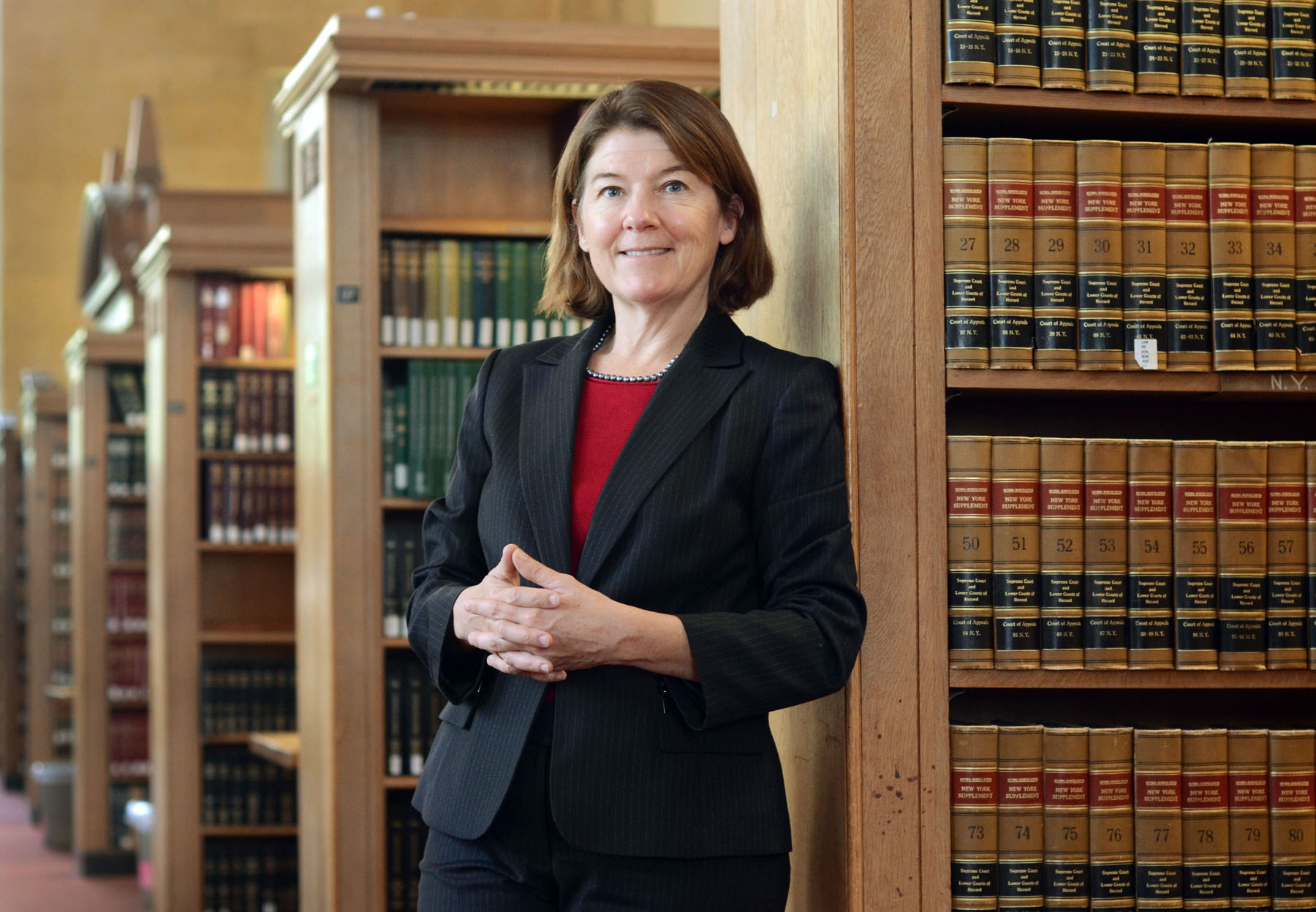
- Born: Lynn Andrea Stout; September 14, 1957; Albany, New York, U.S.
- Died: April 16, 2018 (aged 60); Ithaca, New York, U.S.
- Title: Distinguished Professor of Corporate and Business Law, Cornell Law School
- Children: 2

Academic background
- Education: Yale Law School

Academic work
- Discipline: Law
- Sub-discipline: United States corporate law
- Website: Cornell Law faculty site

Lynn Andrea Stout (September 14, 1957 – April 16, 2018) was an American corporate law scholar. She was a Distinguished Professor of Corporate & Business Law at the Cornell Law School and, before that, the Paul Hastings Professor of Corporate and Securities Law at UCLA Law School. She specialized in researching, writing about, lecturing on, and teaching corporate law, securities and derivatives regulation, law and economics, business ethics, and prosocial behavior in relation to the law. She died on April 16, 2018, at the age of 60 following a long struggle with cancer.

== Career ==
Stout received a B.A. summa cum laude from Princeton University as well as a Master's in Public Policy from Princeton's Woodrow Wilson School and a J.D. from the Yale Law School. Until 2012 she was the Paul Hastings Professor of Corporate and Securities Law at the University of California, Los Angeles School of Law, after which she joined the Cornell Law School where she was the Distinguished Professor of Corporate & Business Law and Director of the Clarke Program on Corporations & Society. She also taught at George Washington Law School, New York University Law School, Harvard Law School, and Georgetown University, and served as a Guest Scholar at the Brookings Institution. She served as an Independent Trustee of the Eaton Vance Mutual Funds since 1998 and on the Advisory Board of the Aspen Institute's Business and Society Program since 2009. Starting in 2014, Stout also served on the U.S. Treasury Department's Financial Research Advisory Committee and on the Board of Governors of the CFA Institute. She was also named one of the 100 Most Influential People In Business Ethics in 2014 by the Ethisphere Institute.

In 2012, Stout elected to leave the UCLA faculty and joined Cornell Law School after UCLA accepted a $10 million donation from Lowell Milken to create a "Lowell Milken Business Law and Policy Institute." Stout expressed ethical concerns about UCLA's decision to name a business law center after Lowell Milken in light of the fact that he had been banned from the securities industry and barred from the New York Stock Exchange.

== Notable theories ==
Stout was one of the first to apply the scientific evidence on unselfish prosocial behavior ("conscience") to our understanding of how legal rules shape behavior. Cultivating Conscience: How Good Laws Make Good People (Princeton University Press, 2011) critiques the "homo economicus" assumption of rational selfishness and surveys behavioral science evidence demonstrating how and when people sacrifice their own material welfare to help or to avoid harming others. It applies the lessons of behavioral science to the questions of how tort, contract, and criminal law rules shape behavior, and suggests how to use law and rules more effectively by recruiting the force of conscience, not just material incentives, to encourage cooperative, ethical, and law-abiding behavior. Stout has also published articles on the importance of unselfish prosocial behavior in analyzing judicial behavior, corporate boards, and corporate and securities law.

Her 2012 book, The Shareholder Value Myth: How Putting Corporations First Harms Investors, Corporations, and the Public, addresses hazards of the "shareholder primacy" view that corporations should be run to maximize shareholder wealth as measured by share price. The Media Consortium named this book "one of the five most impactful stories in 2012" and it was named by Directors & Boards Magazine as the 2012 Governance Book of the Year.

Citizen Capitalism: How A Universal Fund Can Provide Influence and Income to All is a book by Lynn Stout that was published posthumously in 2019. In it, she and her coauthors Sergio Gramitto and Tamara Belinfanti argue for the establishment of a Universal Fund, a mega-mutual fund in which every American over the age of eighteen would receive a share. According to the authors, this would help to solve two pressing problems at once. Firstly, the dividends of the Fund would be distributed to a wide proportion of the American population, thereby reducing inequality, and secondly, the shareholders would have access to the voting rights of the shares within the Fund, giving the American populace a voice in corporate governance like never before. Additionally, it outlines how all of this could be accomplished without government action, through donations made to the Universal Fund by the ultra-wealthy and the corporations themselves.

== Publications ==
=== Selected books ===
- Citizen Capitalism: How A Universal Fund Can Provide Influence and Income to All (Berrett-Koehler Publishers, 2019)
- The Shareholder Value Myth: How Putting Shareholders First Harms Investors, Corporations, and the Public (Berrett-Koehler Publishers, 2012)
- Cultivating Conscience: How Good Laws Make Good People (Princeton University Press, 2011)
- Cases and Materials on Law and Economics (with David Barnes, West 1992)

== See also ==
- US corporate law
- Securities and Exchange Act
