= Michael C. Dorf =

American law professor

- Education: Harvard University (BA, JD)
- Occupation: Law professor
- Years active: 1991–present
- Employer(s): Robert S. Stevens Professor of Law, Cornell Law School
- Board member of: New York State Bar Association; Bar of the Supreme Court of the United States

Michael C. Dorf is an American law professor and a scholar of U.S. constitutional law. He is the Robert S. Stevens Professor of Law at Cornell Law School. In addition to constitutional law, Professor Dorf has taught courses in civil procedure and federal courts. He has authored, co-authored, or edited six books, including Beating Hearts: Abortion and Animal Rights and On Reading the Constitution. He is also a columnist for Verdict and a regular contributor to his blog, Dorf on Law. Dorf is a former law clerk to Justice Anthony Kennedy of the U.S. Supreme Court and Judge Stephen Reinhardt of the United States Court of Appeals for the Ninth Circuit.

== Life ==
Before joining the Cornell faculty in 2008, Dorf was a professor at Columbia University School of Law and, before that, at Rutgers University School of Law in Camden, New Jersey. He graduated from Harvard College and Harvard Law School. While at Harvard as an undergraduate, he was the American Parliamentary Debate Association national champion. Before attending law school, he co-authored three peer-reviewed articles in physics arising out of a fellowship in the physics department of Victoria University of Wellington, New Zealand. Dorf has advised organizations involved in constitutional litigation, and he has written numerous amicus briefs filed with the United States Supreme Court.

Professor Dorf occasionally appears in American news media as a legal expert, and has been interviewed by and/or quoted in, for example, The New York Times, CNN and The Daily Show with Jon Stewart. He has also been cited in numerous judicial opinions, including the majority opinion of Justice John Paul Stevens in the Supreme Court case City of Chicago v. Morales. He is a practitioner of veganism. His late wife, Sherry Colb, was the inaugural C.S. Wong Professor of Law at Cornell Law School.

== Books ==
- with Jesse H. Choper, Richard H. Fallon Jr., & Frederick Schauer, Constitutional Law: Cases—Comments—Questions, West Academic Publishing, 14th ed. 2023, 13th ed. 2019, 12th ed. 2015. ISBN 9781685611439
- with Sherry F. Colb, Beating Hearts: Abortion and Animal Rights, Columbia University Press, 2016. ISBN 9780231540957
- with Trevor Morrison, The Oxford Introductions to U.S. Law: Constitutional Law, Oxford University Press, 2010. ISBN 9780199315031
- No Litmus Test: Law Versus Politics in the Twenty-First Century, Lanham, Md.: Rowman & Littlefield Publishers, 2006. ISBN 9780742550292, OCLC 93538674
- Constitutional Law Stories, New York, NY: Foundation Press, 2009. ISBN 9781599411699, OCLC 778430618
- with Laurence H. Tribe, On Reading the Constitution Cambridge (Mass.); London : Harvard University Press, 1992. ISBN 9780674636262, OCLC 450833193

== Selected law review articles ==
- A Tale of Two Formalisms: How Law-and-Economics Mirrors Originalism and Textualism, 106 Cornell Law Review 591 (co-author Neil H. Buchanan, 2021).
- How to Choose the Least Unconstitutional Option: Lessons for the President (and Others) from the Debt Ceiling Standoff, 112 Columbia Law Review 1175 (co-author Neil H. Buchanan, 2012).
- The Supreme Court 1997 Term—Foreword: The Limits of Socratic Deliberation, 112 Harvard Law Review 4 (1998).
- A Constitution of Democratic Experimentalism, 98 Columbia Law Review 267 (1998) (co-author Charles F. Sabel).
- Incidental Burdens on Fundamental Rights, 109 Harvard Law Review 1175 (1996).
- Facial Challenges to State and Federal Statutes, 46 Stanford Law Review 236 (1994).

== See also ==
- List of law clerks for the first seat of the Supreme Court of the United States
