= Chantal J.M. Thomas =

Chantal J.M. Thomas, Cornell Law Professor at Cornell Law School, directs the Clarke Initiative for Law and Development in the Middle East and North Africa. She teaches in the areas of Law and Development, Law and Globalization, and International Economic Law. She is active in the areas of human rights and social justice, particularly in the Middle East.

== Education ==
Thomas graduated from McGill University in Quebec in 1992 with a B.A. in Political Science. She received the James McGill Award for Outstanding Scholarship in 1989 and was a University Scholar in 1992. In 1995, Thomas received her J.D. and graduated with honors from Harvard Law School. She received a PhD candidate from Cambridge University.

== Career ==
Prior to joining Cornell, Thomas chaired the Law Department of the American University in Cairo, and served on the University of Minnesota and Fordham University law faculties. She has been a Visiting Professor of Law teaching international economic law at institutions including the Center for Transnational Legal Studies in London, Soochow University in China and the University of Texas School of Law. Thomas has been an Academic Visitor to the University of London and Oxford University, School of Law.

Thomas has consulted for the USAID Bureau for Democracy, Conflict, and Humanitarian Affairs. She currently serves on the Executive Council of the American Society of International Law and the U.S. State Department 2019s Advisory Committee on International Law.

Thomas is a founding member of McGill University's Labour Law and Development Research Laboratory, sits on the faculty of Cornell University's Land Theme Project and is a participant in the Interdisciplinary Project on Human Trafficking.

== Speaking engagements ==
Thomas is a frequent speaker and lecturer at conferences and symposiums on the subject of international law, having spoken at the University of Maryland, Washington University in St. Louis, the University of Texas at Austin and the University of Minnesota. In 2014 she was a keynote speaker at the 7th Annual Toronto Group Conference for the Study of International Transnational and Comparative Law.

== Published works ==
Thomas has authored several papers, articles, and book chapters. She has been a featured guest of many news agencies. She has written for CNN and been interviewed by PBS on the subject of Egyptian politics. She focuses her scholarship on the relationship between international law, political economy, and global social justice in a variety of contexts. Her writings include:

=== Papers and articles ===
- "What Does the Emerging International Law of Migration Mean for Sovereignty?", Melbourne Journal of International Law (2014)
- "Immigration Controls and 'Modern-Day Slavery'", Cornell Legal Studies Research Paper No. 13-86 (2013)
- "International Law against Sex Trafficking, in Perspective", Cornell Legal Studies Research Paper No. 13-85 (2013)
- "Legal Innovation and Empowerment for Development", The World Bank Legal Review, Vol. 4 (2013)
- "Law and Neoclassical Economic Development in Theory and Practice: Toward an Institutionalist Critique of Institutionalism",Cornell Law Faculty Publications Paper (2011)
- "Globalization and the Border: Trade, Labor, Migration, and Agricultural Production in Mexico", Cornell Law Library Faculty Publications Paper (2010)
- "Re-Reading Weber in Law and Development: A Critical Intellectual History of "Good Governance" Reform", Cornell Law Faculty Publications Paper (2008)
- "Theme I: Economy, Prosperity, and Social Justice", Leiden Journal of International Law (2003)
- "Trade-Related Labor and Environment Agreements", Journal of International Economic Law (2002)
- "Migrant Domestic Workers in Egypt: A Case Study of the Economic Family in Global Context", American Journal of Comparative Law Vol. 58
- "Balance-of-Payments Crises in the Developing World: Balancing Trade, Finance and Development in the New Economic Order", American University International Law Review Vol. 15, Issue 6 (2000)
- "International Debt Forgiveness and Global Poverty Reduction", Fordham Urban Law Journal Vol. 27, Issue 5 (1999)
- "Poverty Reduction, Trade, and Rights", American University International Law Review 18, no. 6 (2003): 1399–1424.
- "Transfer of Technology in the Contemporary International Order", Fordham International Law Journal Vol. 22, Issue 5 (1998)

=== Books ===
- Developing Countries in the WTO Legal System with Joel Trachtman, Oxford University Press (2009)

=== Book chapters ===
- Empowerment and Innovation Strategies for Law, Justice and Development, in THE WORLD BANK LEGAL REVIEW, VOLUME 4: LEGAL INNOVATION AND EMPOWERMENT FOR DEVELOPMENT, at 3 (2012)
- The Death of Doha? Forensics of Democratic Governance, Distributive Justice, and Development in the WTO, in Chi Carmody, Frank Garcia, and John Linarelli eds., GLOBAL JUSTICE IN INTERNATIONAL ECONOMIC LAW (Cambridge University Press) (2012)
- Effects of Globalization in Mexico, 1980–2000: Labour Migration as an Unintended Consequence, in Adelle Blackett & Christian Lévesque eds., SOCIAL REGIONALISM IN THE GLOBAL ECONOMY (2010) (Routledge).
- Trade and Labor in the World Trade Organization, in Sarah Joseph ed., Human Rights and the World Trade Organization (Edward Elgar) (2009).
- Intellectual Property Intersections with Trade and Labor Rules: Rethinking Domestic and International Strategies to Promote Biodiversity from the 'NAFTA Corn' Example, in Daniel J. Gervais ed., INTELLECTUAL PROPERTY, TRADE AND DEVELOPMENT (Oxford University Press) (2007).
- Constitutionalism, Trade Legislation, and "Democracy", in Richard W. Bauman & Tsvi Kahana eds., THE LEAST EXAMINED BRANCH: THE ROLE OF LEGISLATURES IN THE CONSTITUTIONAL STATE (Cambridge University Press) (2006).
- "Non-Trade" Issues and the WTO, in E. KWAN CHOI & JAMES C. HARTIGAN EDS., HANDBOOK OF INTERNATIONAL TRADE – VOL. II: ECONOMIC AND LEGAL ANALYSIS OF LAWS AND INSTITUTIONS (Oxford: Blackwell Publishing) (2004).
