= Cornell Journal of Law and Public Policy =

- Discipline: Law
- Language: English
- Edited by: Marieya Jagroop, Editor-in-Chief; Elizabeth Sherstinsky, Managing Editor

Publication details
- History: 1992-present
- Publisher: Cornell Law School
- Frequency: Quarterly

Standard abbreviations
- Bluebook: Cornell J.L. & Pub. Pol'y
- ISO 4: Cornell J. Law Public Policy

Indexing
- ISSN: 1069-0565

Links
- Journal homepage

The Cornell Journal of Law and Public Policy (JLPP) is a law review published by students at Cornell Law School. Founded in 1991, JLPP publishes articles, commentaries, book reviews, and student notes that explore the intersections of law, government, public policy, and the social sciences, with a focus on current domestic issues and their implications.

JLPP accepts and solicits manuscripts written by members of the academic and professional community. It publishes three issues each year (fall, spring, and summer).

Journalist Ari Melber served as editor of the journal while studying at Cornell.

In the past, JLPP has accepted for publication submissions from then-Senator and later President Joe Biden, then-Attorney General Janet Reno, Chief Judge Dennis Jacobs of the Second Circuit, and Governor of Puerto Rico Luis Fortuño, among others.

In addition to its publications, JLPP also provides a forum for the discussion of current issues of law and public policy by sponsoring or co-sponsoring an annual symposium at Cornell Law School. Each symposium theme is addressed in an issue of the journal, through symposium papers and related manuscripts.
