= Empirical legal studies =

Approach to legal scholarship

Empirical legal studies (ELS) is an approach to the study of law, legal procedure, and legal theory through the use of empirical research. Empirical legal researchers use research techniques that are typical of economics, psychology, and sociology; however, ELS research tends to be more focused on purely legal questions than the related fields of law and economics, legal psychology, and sociology of law. ELS also tends to be more narrowly quantitative than fields such as law-and-society or new legal realism (NLR), which embrace qualitative and quantitative social science methods, as well as mixed method approaches.

In 2004, the Journal of Empirical Legal Studies was launched by the Society for Empirical Legal Studies and Cornell Law School, and within three years rose to be ranked 28th of the over 800 US law journals.
