= 168th Street =

168th Street may refer to:

- 168th Street (Manhattan)
- 168th Street station (BMT Jamaica Line), now demolished
- 168th Street station (New York City Subway), serving the 1, A, and C trains
