= Stewart J. Schwab =

American academic and administrator

Stewart J. Schwab is an American law professor and former dean of Cornell Law School from 2004 to 2014.

== Early and personal life ==
Schwab was born in 1954 in Chapel Hill, North Carolina, where he grew up and met his wife, Norma, in grade school. The two married in 1975, the same year Schwab graduated from Swarthmore College. They have eight children and seven grandchildren, and reside in Ithaca, New York.

He earned his J.D. degree in law and his Ph.D. in economics from the University of Michigan and served as law clerk to Justice Sandra Day O'Connor of the U.S. Supreme Court and Judge James Dickson Phillips Jr., of the United States Court of Appeals for the Fourth Circuit.

== Career ==
Schwab is an expert in economic analysis of the law and employment law. He has been a member of the Cornell Law School faculty since 1983 and served as the Allan R. Tessler Dean of Cornell Law School from 2004 to 2014. Schwab is currently a Reporter for the American Law Institute’s Restatement of Employment Law and serves as a co-editor for the Journal of Empirical Legal Studies. His scholarship is frequently listed among the highest rated in terms of scholarly impact and in 2008 he was named one the nation’s 50 most powerful employment attorneys by the publication Human Resource Executive.

In 2007, Schwab received the Ordre national du Mérite.

== Publications ==
=== Books authored ===
- Schwab, Stewart; Willborn, Steven; Burton, John; Lester, Gillian (2012). Employment Law: Cases and Materials. Lexis Law Publishers. ISBN 978-1422490778.
- Schwab, Stewart; Estreicher, Samuel (2000). Foundations of Labor and Employment Law. Foundation Press. ISBN 978-1566629928.

=== Selected scholarly publications ===
- Splitting Logs: An Empirical Perspective on Employment Discrimination Settlements, 96 Cornell Law Review 931 (2011) (with M. Heise)
- Employment Discrimination Plaintiffs in Federal Court: From Bad to Worse? 3 Harvard Law & Policy Review 103 (2009)
- The Costs of Wrongful-Discharge Laws, 88 Review of Economics & Statistics 211-31 (May 2006) (with D. Autor & J. Donohue),
- What Shapes Perceptions of the Federal Court System?, 56 University of Chicago Law Review 501 (Spring 1989) (with T. Eisenberg)

== See also ==
- List of law clerks for the eighth seat of the Supreme Court of the United States
