= Mitchel Lasser =

American lawyer

- Education: Yale University; Harvard Law School
- Occupations: Lawyer, Professor

Mitchel Lasser is an American lawyer, currently the Jack G. Clarke Professor of Law at Cornell Law School, and formerly the Samuel D. Thurman Professor at S.J. Quinney College of Law, University of Utah and the Maurice R. Greenberg Visiting Professor at Yale Law School in 2007–2008. His work is primarily focused on comparative law, European Union law, and judicial process. Additionally, he is a co-director of the Cornell Summer Institute of International and Comparative Law in Paris, co-sponsored by Cornell Law School and the Université Paris I Panthéon-Sorbonne.

== Education ==
- B.A., Yale College, 1986
- J.D., Harvard Law School, 1989
- M.A., Yale University, 1990
- Ph.D., Yale University, 1995

== Selected Works ==
- Judicial (Dis-)Appointments: The Rise of European Judicial Independence (in progress).
- Judicial Transformations: The Rights Revolution in the Courts of Europe (Oxford University Press, 2009).
- Judicial Deliberations: A Comparative Analysis of Judicial Transparency and Legitimacy (Oxford University Press, 2004).
