= Journal of Empirical Legal Studies =

- Discipline: Law
- Language: English

Publication details
- History: 2004-present
- Publisher: Wiley-Blackwell in collaboration with the Cornell Law School
- Frequency: Quarterly

Standard abbreviations
- Bluebook: J. Empirical Legal Stud.
- ISO 4: J. Empir. Leg. Stud.

Indexing
- ISSN: 1740-1453 (print); 1740-1461 (web)

Links
- Journal homepage; Wiley Online Library

The Journal of Empirical Legal Studies is a peer-edited and peer-reviewed academic journal that publishes empirically oriented research on a wide range of legal topics, including civil justice, civil procedure, corporate law, administrative law, and constitutional law. The journal is highly interdisciplinary and draws authors from law schools, as well as from economics, psychology, sociology, public policy, and political science departments. The journal was established in 2004 and is published by Wiley-Blackwell in collaboration with the Cornell Law School. In terms of academic citations, the journal is ranked 1st among refereed law and social science journals, and 1st among refereed law and economics journals; in terms of judicial citations, it is ranked 2nd and 1st in those categories, respectively; in terms of impact, it is ranked 2nd and 1st in those categories, respectively.

== See also ==
- Empirical legal studies
- Legal psychology
- Law and economics
