= Ernest Wilson Huffcut =

American lawyer

Ernest Wilson Huffcut (November 21, 1860 – May 4, 1907) was an American lawyer and educator, born in Kent, Connecticut. He attended Cornell University, where he was a brother of Theta Delta Chi and subsequently graduated in 1884. Following his undergraduate education, he enrolled directly into the Cornell Law School from which he graduated in 1888. He then practiced law at Minneapolis, Minnesota, in 1888–90, served as professor of law at Indiana University in 1890–92, and thereafter was dean of Cornell Law School. Governor Charles Evans Hughes, of New York, at the beginning of his first term (1907), appointed Huffcut his legal adviser. Supposedly the result of a breakdown due to overwork, Huffcut committed suicide by shooting himself on board the Albany boat, C. W. Morse coming down the Hudson River.

== Published works ==
- American Cases on Contracts (1884; third revised edition, 1913) with E. H. Woodruff
- Cases on the Law of Agency (1896; second edition, 1907)
- Elements of Business Law (1905)
