= Jens David Ohlin =

American legal academic (born 1974)

17th Dean of Cornell Law School
- Incumbent
- Assumed office July 1, 2021
- President: Martha E. Pollack
- Preceded by: Eduardo Peñalver

Personal details
- Born: 1974 (age 51–52)
- Education: Skidmore College (BA); Columbia University (MA, MPhil, PhD, JD)

Jens David Ohlin (born 1974) is an American legal scholar, currently serving as the 17th dean of Cornell Law School since July 2021.

== Education ==
Ohlin was born in 1974. He completed his high school education at Phillips Academy in Andover, Massachusetts.

Ohlin received a B.A. from Skidmore College in Saratoga Springs, New York, in 1996. He then received an M.A. in 1998, an M.Phil. in 2000, and a Ph.D. in 2002 from Columbia University. He received a Juris Doctor from Columbia Law School in 2005.

== Career ==
Ohlin joined Cornell Law School as a faculty member in 2008. Later, he served as Director of Faculty Research (2013–2015), Associate Dean for Academic Affairs (2015–2017), Vice Dean (2017–2020), and Interim Dean (January–June 2021). Ohlin became dean of Cornell Law School on July 1, 2021, succeeding Eduardo Peñalver.

Ohlin's scholarship ranges from criminal conspiracy law, criminal procedure, public international law to the laws of war. In Election Interference: International Law and the Future of Democracy (2020), Ohlin argued that the Russian interference in the 2016 United States elections was against international law because it violated the collective right of self-determination. With Duncan Hollis, he also edited Defending Democracies: Combatting Foreign Election Interference in a Digital Age (2020).
