= Cornell Law School =

Private law school in Ithaca, New York, US

Coordinates: 42.443874°N 76.485803°W

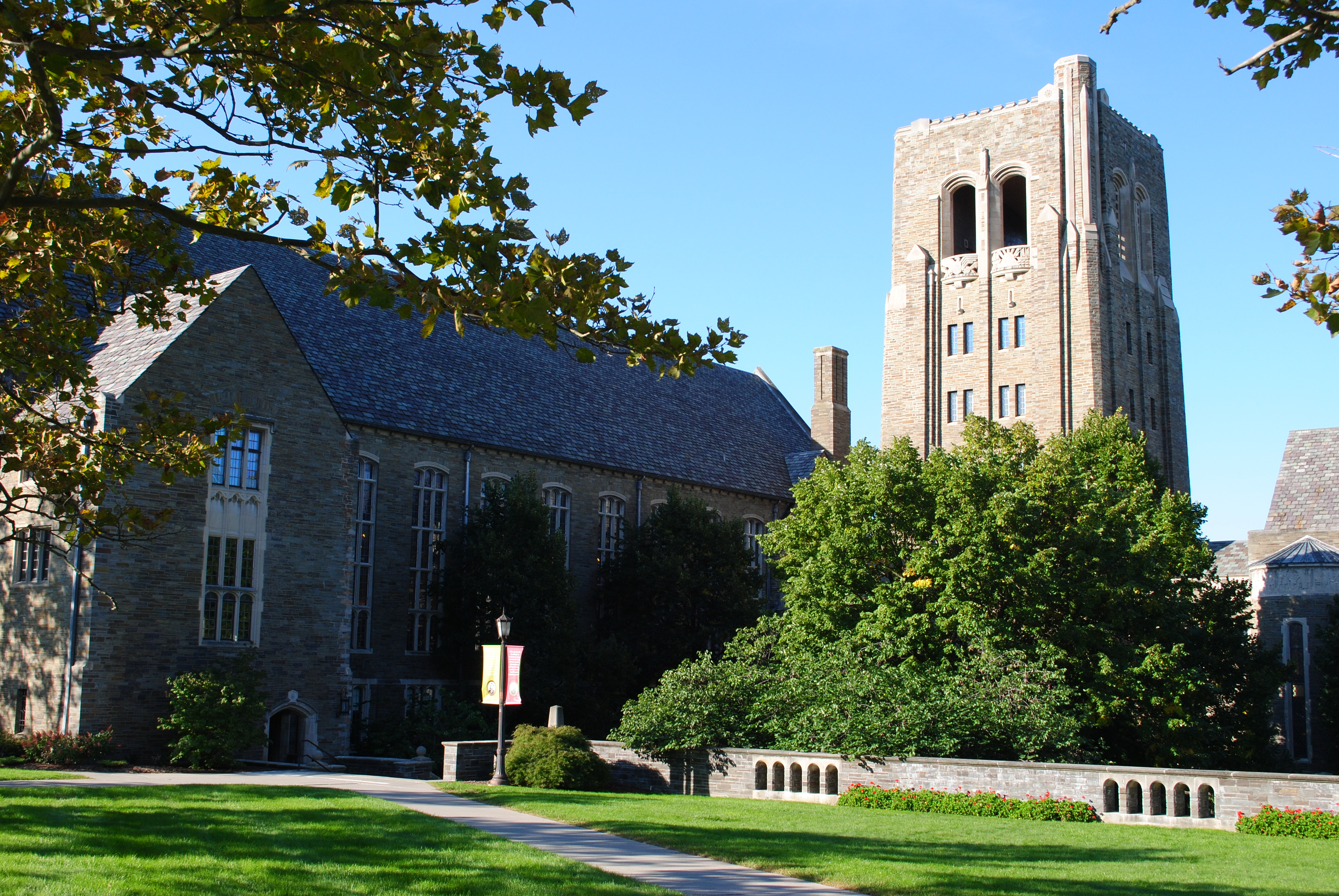
- Parent school: Cornell University
- Established: 1887; 139 years ago
- School type: Private
- Parent endowment: $10 billion
- Dean: Jens David Ohlin
- Location: Ithaca, New York, United States
- Enrollment: 585
- Faculty: 201
- USNWR ranking: 13th (tie) (2026)
- Bar pass rate: 96.41% (class of 2024)
- Website: lawschool.cornell.edu
- ABA profile: Standard 509 Report

Cornell Law School is the law school of Cornell University, a private, Ivy League university in Ithaca, New York.

One of the five Ivy League law schools, Cornell Law School offers four degree programs (JD, LLM, MSLS and JSD) along with several dual-degree programs in conjunction with other professional schools at the university. It was established in 1887 as Cornell University's Department of Law. Currently, the school graduates around 200 students each year.

Cornell Law School is home to the Legal Information Institute (LII), the Journal of Empirical Legal Studies, the Cornell Law Review, the Cornell Journal of Law and Public Policy, and the Cornell International Law Journal.

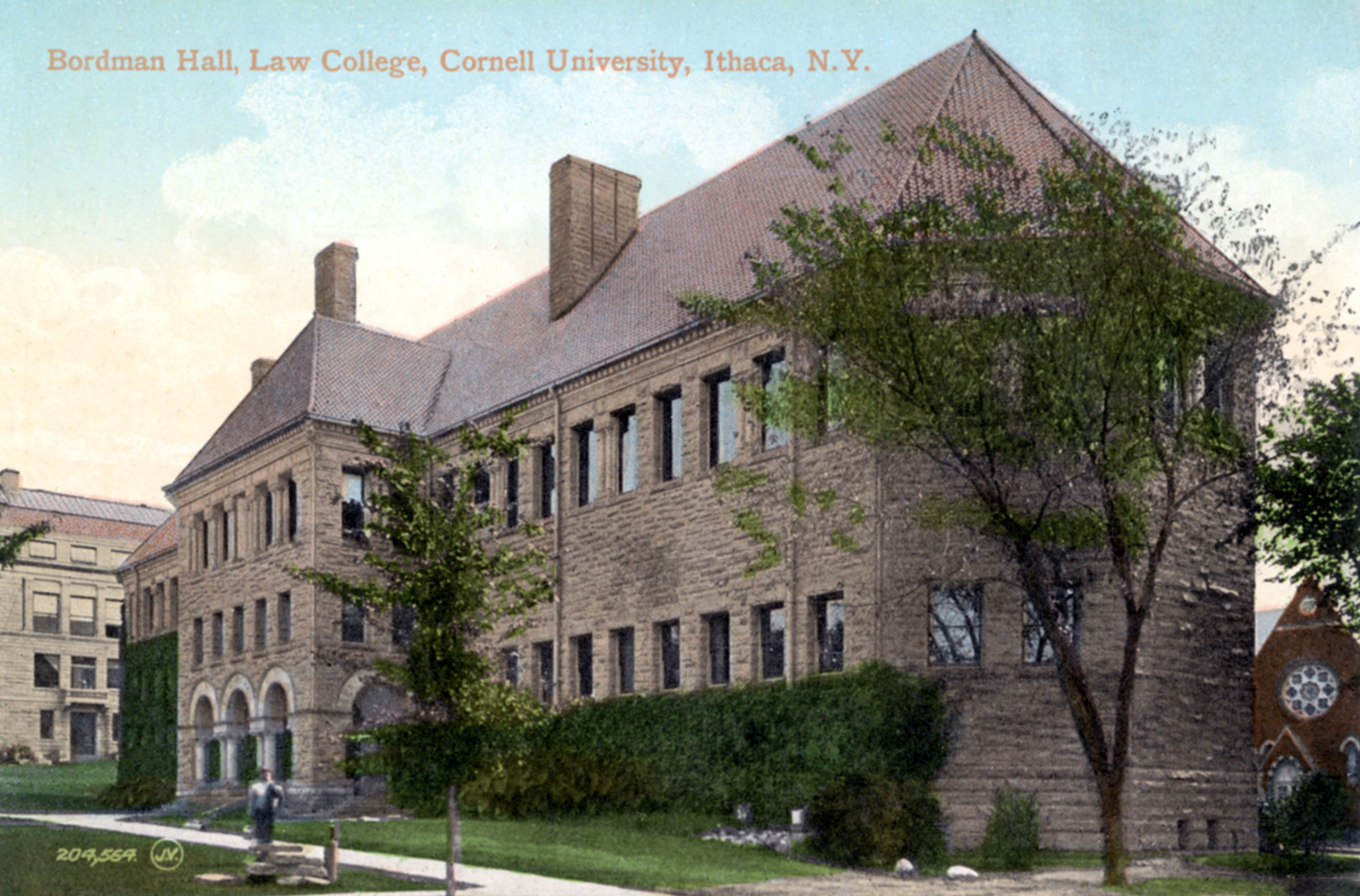
Boardman Hall, the old Cornell Law College building, c. 1910

== History ==
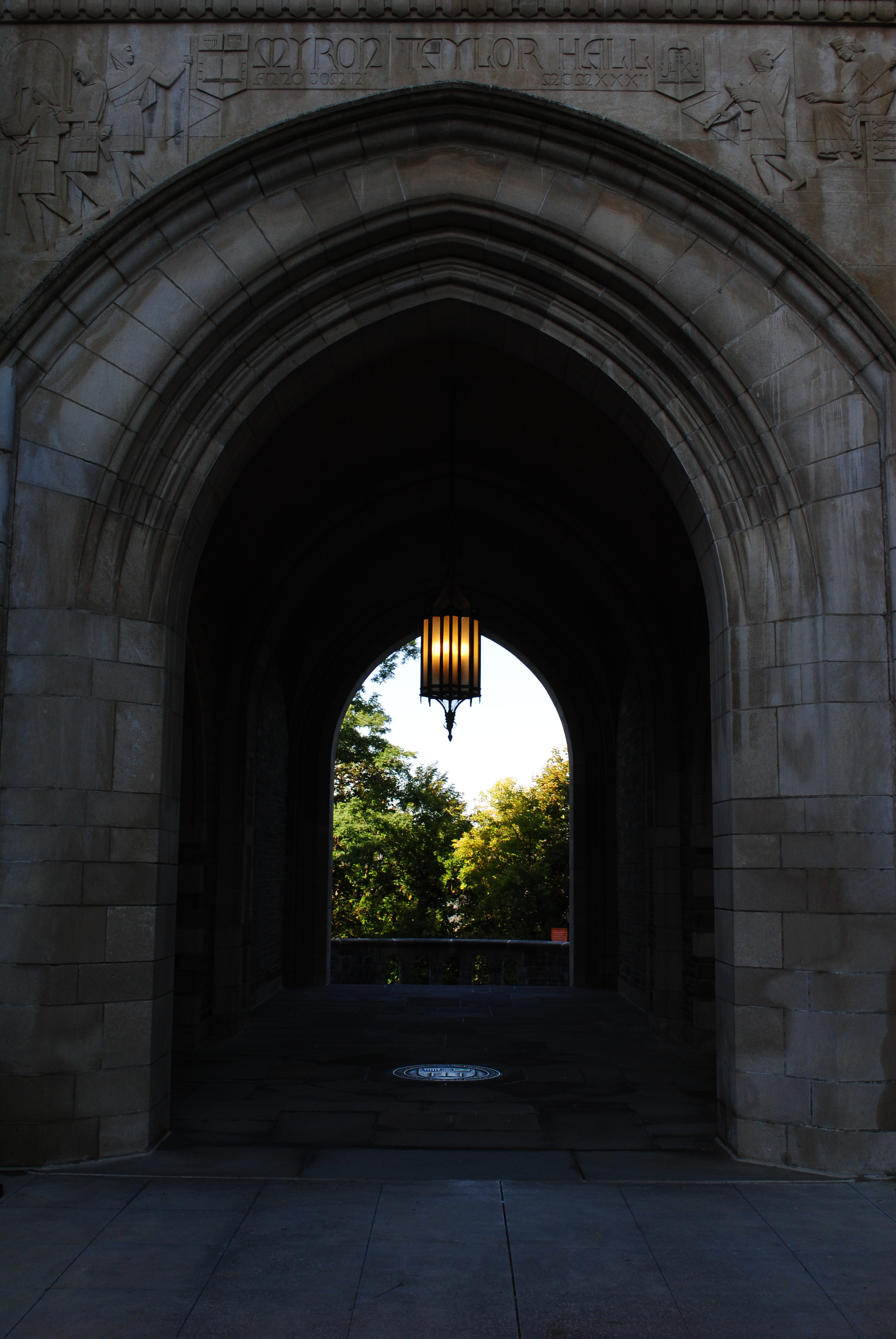
Entrance to Myron Taylor Hall, Cornell Law's principal building for instruction

=== 19th century ===
The Law Department at Cornell opened in 1887 in Morrill Hall with Judge Douglass Boardman as its first dean. At that time, admission did not require even a high school diploma. In 1917, two years of undergraduate education were required for admission, and in 1924, it became a graduate degree program. The department was renamed the Cornell Law School in 1925. In 1890, George Washington Fields graduated, one of the first law school graduates of color in the United States. In 1893, Cornell had its first female graduate, Mary Kennedy Brown. Future Governor, Secretary of State, and Chief Justice of the United States, Charles Evans Hughes, was a professor of law at Cornell from 1891 to 1893, and after returning to legal practice he continued to teach at the law school as a special lecturer from 1893 to 1895. Hughes Hall, one of the law school's central buildings, is named in his honor.

In 1892, the school moved into Boardman Hall, which was constructed specifically for legal instruction. The school moved from Boardman Hall (now the site of Olin Library) to its present-day location at Myron Taylor Hall in 1932. The law school building, an ornate, Gothic structure, was the result of a donation by Myron Charles Taylor, a former CEO of US Steel, and a member of the Cornell Law class of 1894.

=== 20th century ===
Hughes Hall was built as an addition to Myron Taylor Hall and completed in 1963. It was also funded by a gift from Taylor. Another addition to Myron Taylor Hall, the Jane M.G. Foster wing, was completed in 1988 and added more space to the library. Foster was a member of the class of 1918, an editor of the Cornell Law Review (then Cornell Law Quarterly), and an Order of the Coif graduate.

In 1948, Cornell Law School established a program of specialization in international affairs and also started awarding LL.B. degrees. In 1968, the school began to publish the Cornell International Law Journal. In 1991, the school established the Berger International Legal Studies Program. In 1994, the school established a partnership with the University of Paris I law faculty to establish a Paris-based Summer Institute of International and Comparative Law.

=== 21st century ===
From 1999 to 2004 the school hosted the Feminism and Legal Theory Project. In 2006, the school established its second summer law institute in Suzhou, China. The Clarke Program in East Asian Law and Culture was established in 2002.

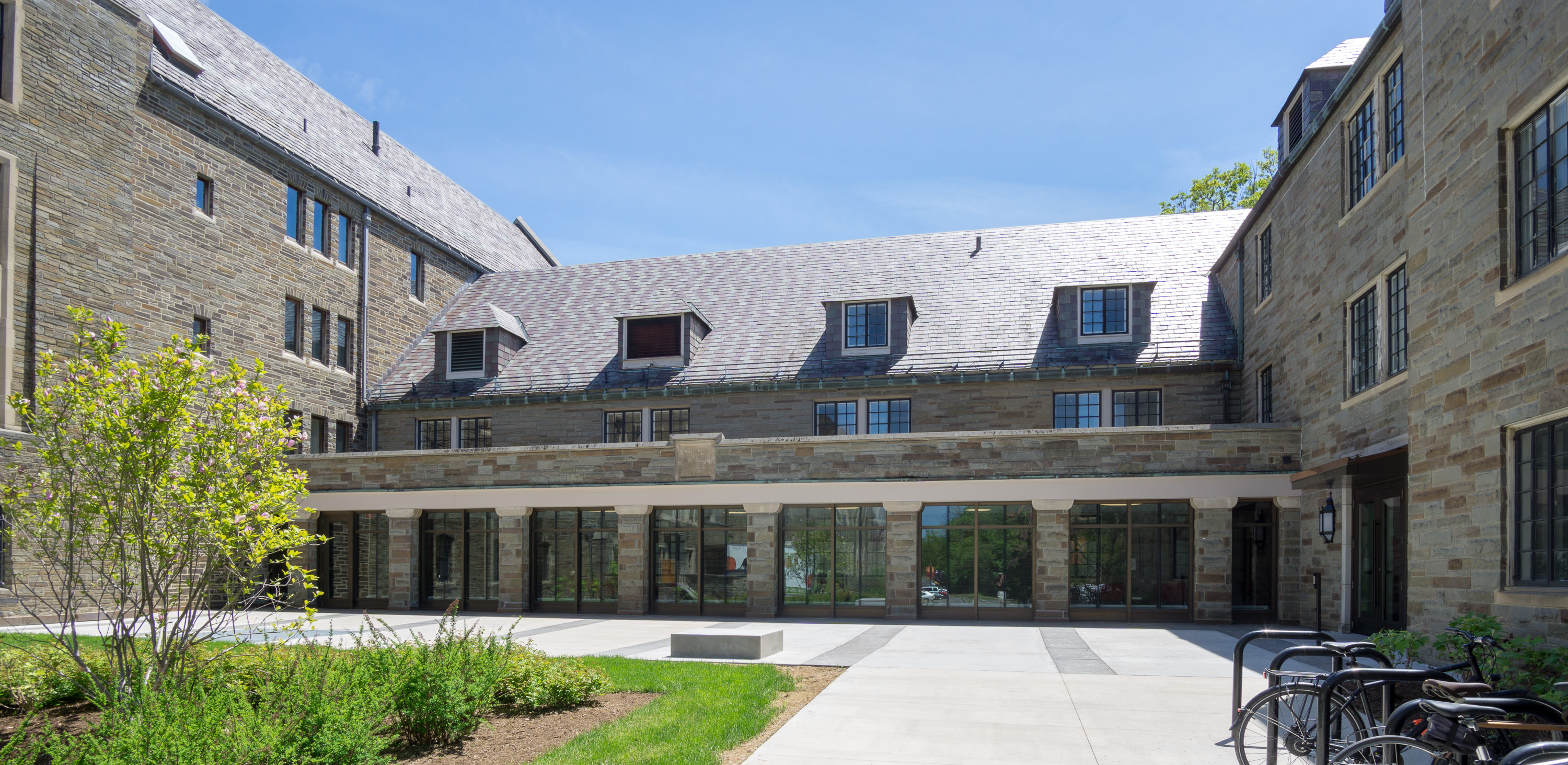
Hughes Hall after 2017 renovations

In June 2012, the school embarked on a multi-year, multi-phase expansion and renovation. The first phase created additional classroom space underground, adjacent to Myron Taylor Hall along College Avenue. The second phase included the removal and digitization of printed materials from the library stacks so that the space could be converted into additional classroom and student space. The third phase involved converting Hughes Hall into office space. As a result, Myron Taylor Hall saw the addition of 40,000 square feet of underground classroom space. The renovation of Hughes Hall was completed in 2017.

== Academics ==
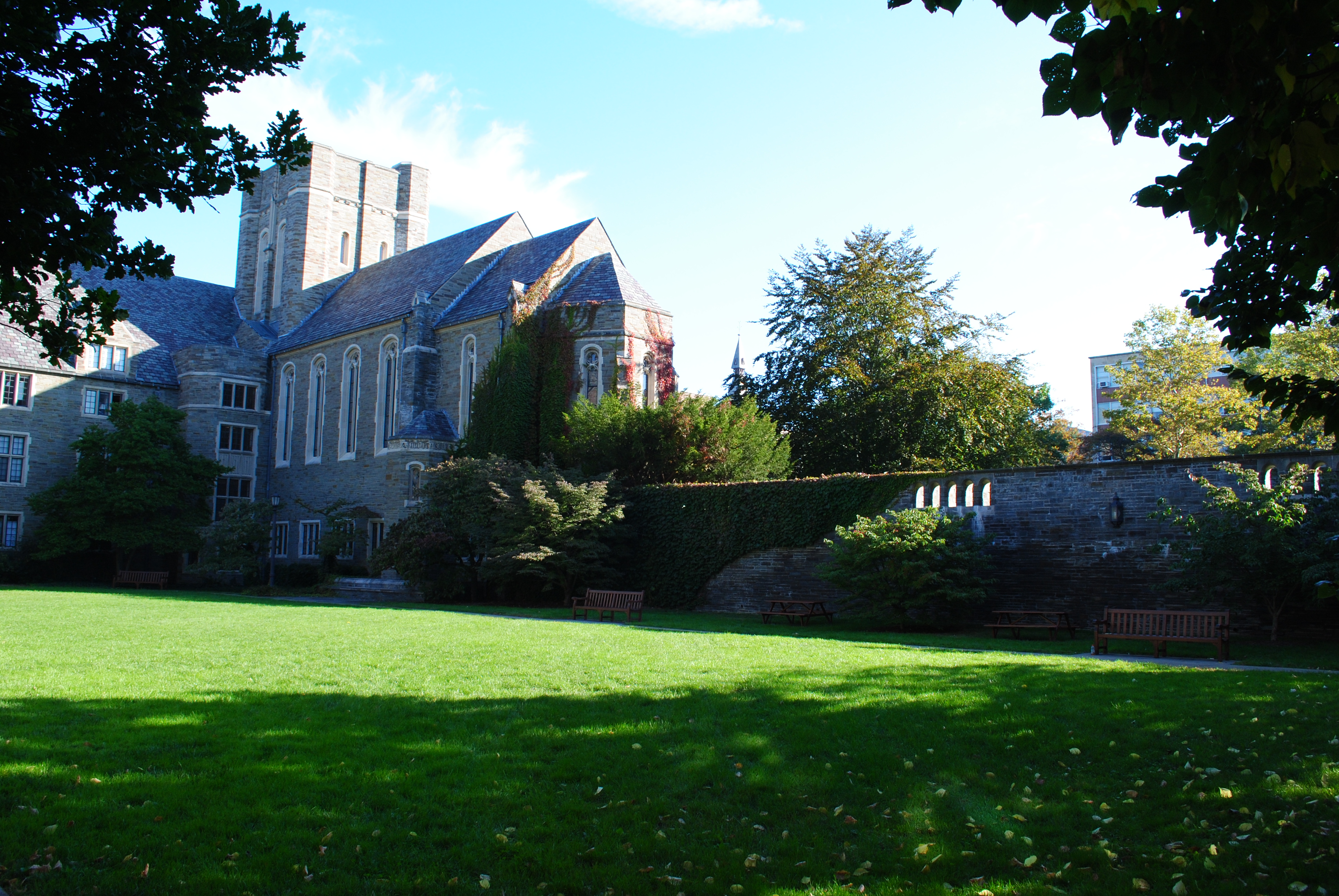
Interior of Cornell Law School quad

=== Degree programs ===
Cornell has offered LL.M and J.S.D degrees since 1928. The joint JD/MBA (with Cornell's Johnson School of Management) has three- and four-year tracks, The JD/MILR program is four years, the JD/MPA is four years, and the JD/MRP is four years.

In addition, Cornell has joint program arrangements with universities abroad to prepare students for international licensure:

- Joint program with University of Paris (La Sorbonne) (JD/Master en Droit)
- Joint program with Humboldt University of Berlin (JD/M.LL.P)
- Joint program with Institut d’Études Politiques de Paris (JD/Master in Global Business Law)

The JD/Master en Droit lasts four years and prepares graduates for admission to the bar in the United States and France.

Cornell Law School runs two summer institutes overseas, providing Cornell Law students with unique opportunities to engage in rigorous international legal studies. The Cornell-Université de Paris I Summer Institute of International and Comparative Law at the Sorbonne in Paris, France offers a diverse curriculum in the historic Sorbonne and Centre Panthéon (Faculté de Droit) buildings at the heart of the University of Paris I: Panthéon-Sorbonne. Coursework includes international human rights, comparative legal systems, and international commercial arbitration. French language classes are also offered.

In 2006, Cornell Law School announced that it would launch a second summer law institute, the new Workshop in International Business Transactions with Chinese Characteristics in Suzhou, China. In partnership with Bucerius Law School (Germany) and Kenneth Wang School of Law at Soochow University (China), Cornell Law provides students from the United States, Europe, and China with an academic forum in which they can collaborate on an international business problem.

=== Rankings ===
Cornell Law School was ranked 2nd in the 2023 Above the Law rankings, which prioritizes career outcomes above all other factors. In 2023, Cornell Law was ranked 1st (in a tie) with an "A+" rating by The National Jurist in the "Best Schools for Law Firm Employment" listing. The school ranked 13th in the 2026 U.S. News & World Report Law School rankings.

=== Admissions ===
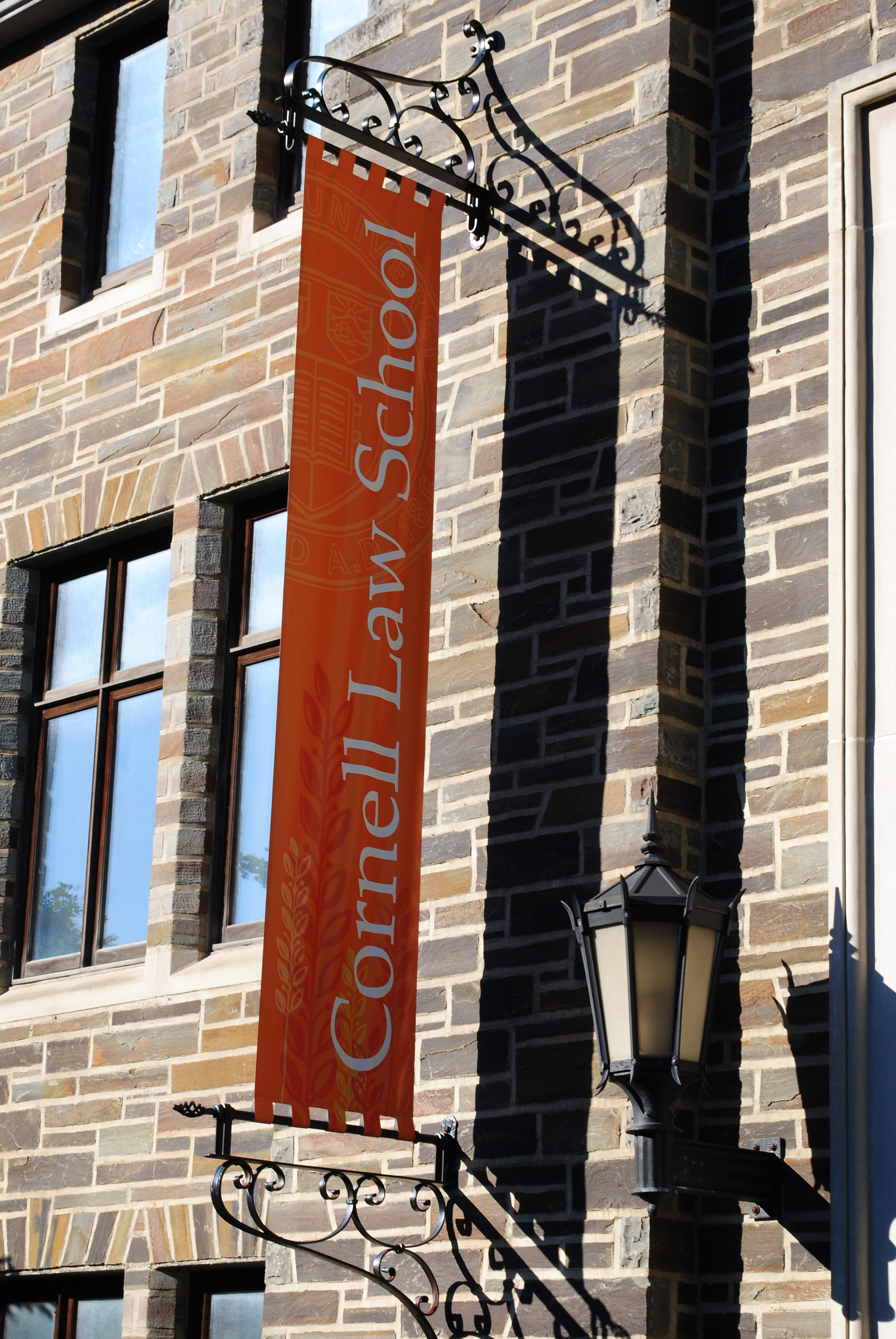
Banner outside the law school's Jane M.G. Foster wing

Cornell Law School is extremely selective: the median LSAT for the 2025 entering class was 173 (98th percentile among all test takers) and the 75th percentile was 175 (99th percentile among all test takers). The median undergraduate GPA was 3.92.

For the 2021 LL.M. program, which is designed for non-U.S.-trained lawyers, 900 applications were received for the 50 to 60 openings. LL.M. students come from over 30 different countries.

Along with consideration of the quality of an applicant's academic record and LSAT scores, the full-file-review admissions process places a heavy emphasis on an applicant's statement, letters of recommendation, community and extracurricular involvement, and work experience. The application also invites a statement on diversity and a short note on why an applicant particularly wants to attend Cornell. The law school values applicants who have done their research and have particular interests or goals that would be served by attending the school versus one of its peer institutions.

=== Campus ===
Cornell Law is housed within Myron Taylor Hall (erected 1932), which contains the Law Library, classrooms, offices, a moot courtroom, and the Cornell Legal Aid Clinic.

==== Library ====
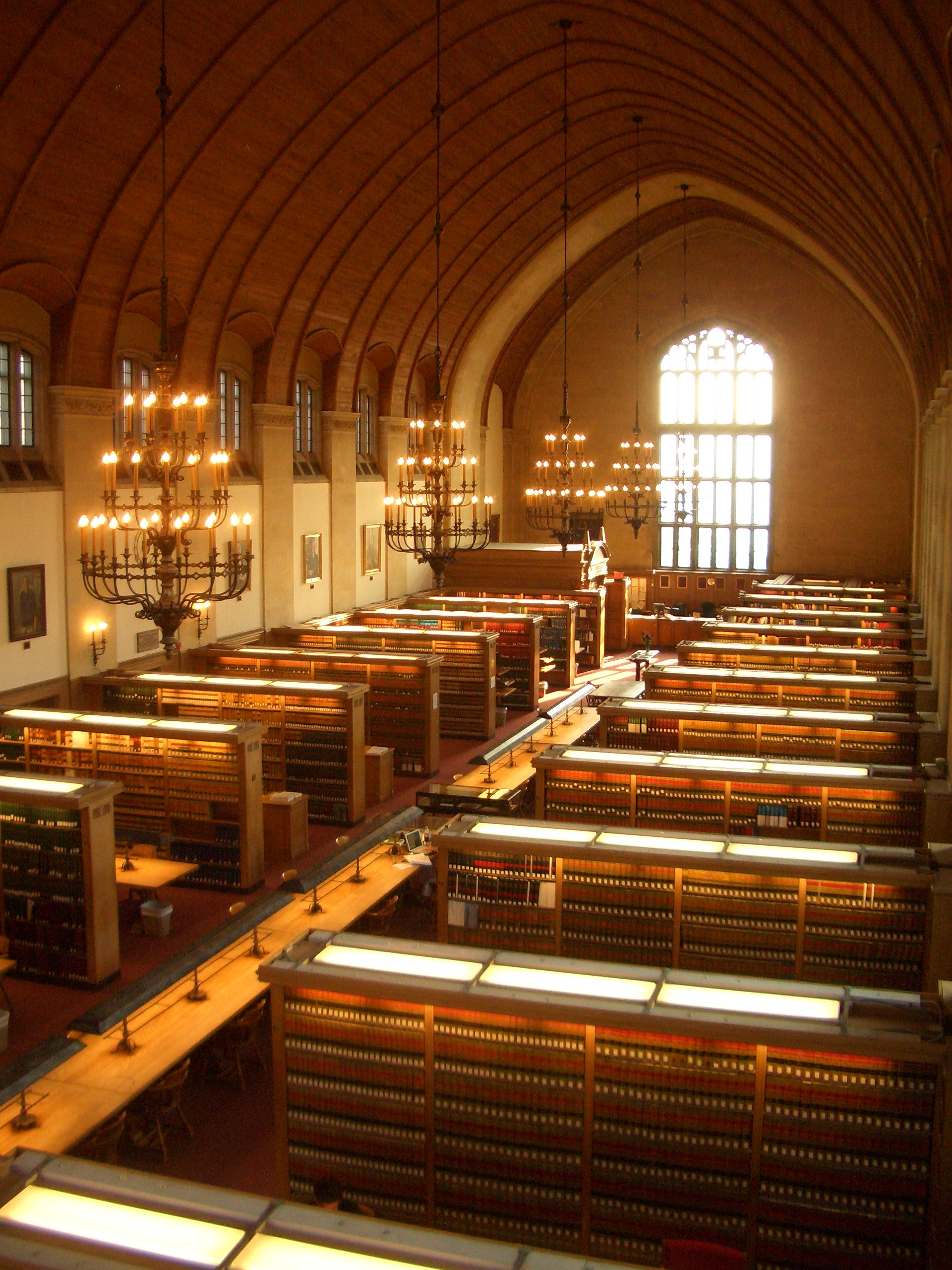
The Cornell Law Library is one of twelve national depositories for print records of briefs filed with the U.S. Supreme Court.

The law library contains 700,000 books and microforms and includes rare historical texts relevant to the legal history of the United States. The library is one of the 12 national depositories for print records of briefs filed with the United States Supreme Court. Also, there is a large collection of print copies of the records and briefs of the New York Court of Appeals. The large microfilm collection has sets of Congressional, Supreme Court, and United Nations documents, as well as a large collection of World Law Reform Commission materials. Microfiche records and briefs for the United States Supreme Court, the United States Court of Appeals for the Second Circuit and D.C. Circuit, and the New York State Court of Appeals are also collected. The library also has a large collection of international, foreign, and comparative law, with the main focus being on the Commonwealth of Nations and Europe. Along with this, there are also collections of public international law and international trade law. A new initiative by the library is to collect Chinese, Japanese, and Korean resources to support the law school's Clarke Program in East Asian Law and Culture.

Rare books in the library include the Samuel Thorne collection, which has 175 of some of the earliest and most rare books on law. Other significant collections include the Nathaniel C. Moak Library and the Edwin J. Marshall Collection of early works on equity and the Earl J. Bennett Collection of Statutory Material, a print collection of original colonial, territorial, and state session laws and statutory codes. Among the library's special collections are the 19th Century Trials Collection, Donovan Nuremberg Trials Collection, Scottsboro Collection, William P. and Adele Langston Rogers Collection and the Chile Declassification Project.

== Student life ==
=== Costs ===
The 2022-2023, non-discounted tuition for the JD program was $74,098 per year. The total cost of attendance (indicating the cost of tuition, fees, and living expenses) at Cornell Law School for the 2022-2023 academic year was $97,618, bringing the total non-discounted cost of attendance for the J.D. class of 2025 to approximately $313,831 (assuming a total cost increase of 7% per year). According to Cornell Law's 2022 509 ABA disclosures, 86% of its students received grants or scholarships, though only 17% received grants or scholarships covering half or more of their tuition.

=== Employment ===
Cornell Law is known for its large firm prowess, placing a greater portion of its J.D. graduates at big law firms than any other law school in the United States. On the public service front, Cornell Law is known for the Cornell Law Death Penalty Project; its Tenants Advocacy Practicum; and for housing the Legal Information Institute, a non-profit, public service of Cornell Law School that provides no-cost access to legal research sources online at law.cornell.edu, serving over 47 million unique visitors per year.

Approximately 92% of the Class of 2022 obtained full-time, long-term, JD-required employment within ten months of graduation. According to Reuters, Cornell Law placed a greater portion of its 2022 graduates in associate positions at big law firms than any other law school in the United States. Of the graduating class of 2022, approximately 80% were employed at large firms with more than 250 attorneys. And in total, approximately 83% of that class obtained elite employment outcomes in the form of federal clerkships or employment at firms with more than 250 attorneys. In a comparative survey of all law schools, Cornell graduates earned the highest average salaries in the United States from 2014 through 2019, with a mean salary of over $183,000. The median private-sector salary for Cornell Law graduates is $215,000. In 2023, Law.com ranked Cornell Law #2 on its ranking of the 50 best law schools for getting an associate position at the largest 100 law firms in the country.

=== Publications ===
The school has three law journals that are student-edited: the Cornell Law Review, the Cornell International Law Journal, and the Cornell Journal of Law and Public Policy. Additionally, the Journal of Empirical Legal Studies is a peer-reviewed journal that is published by Cornell Law faculty.

=== Moot court ===
Cornell Law students actively participate in myriad moot court competitions annually, both in the law school itself and in external and international competitions. The Langfan First-Year Moot Court Competition, which takes place every spring, traditionally draws a large majority of the first-year class. Other internal competitions include the Cuccia Cup and the Rossi Cup.

== Initiatives ==
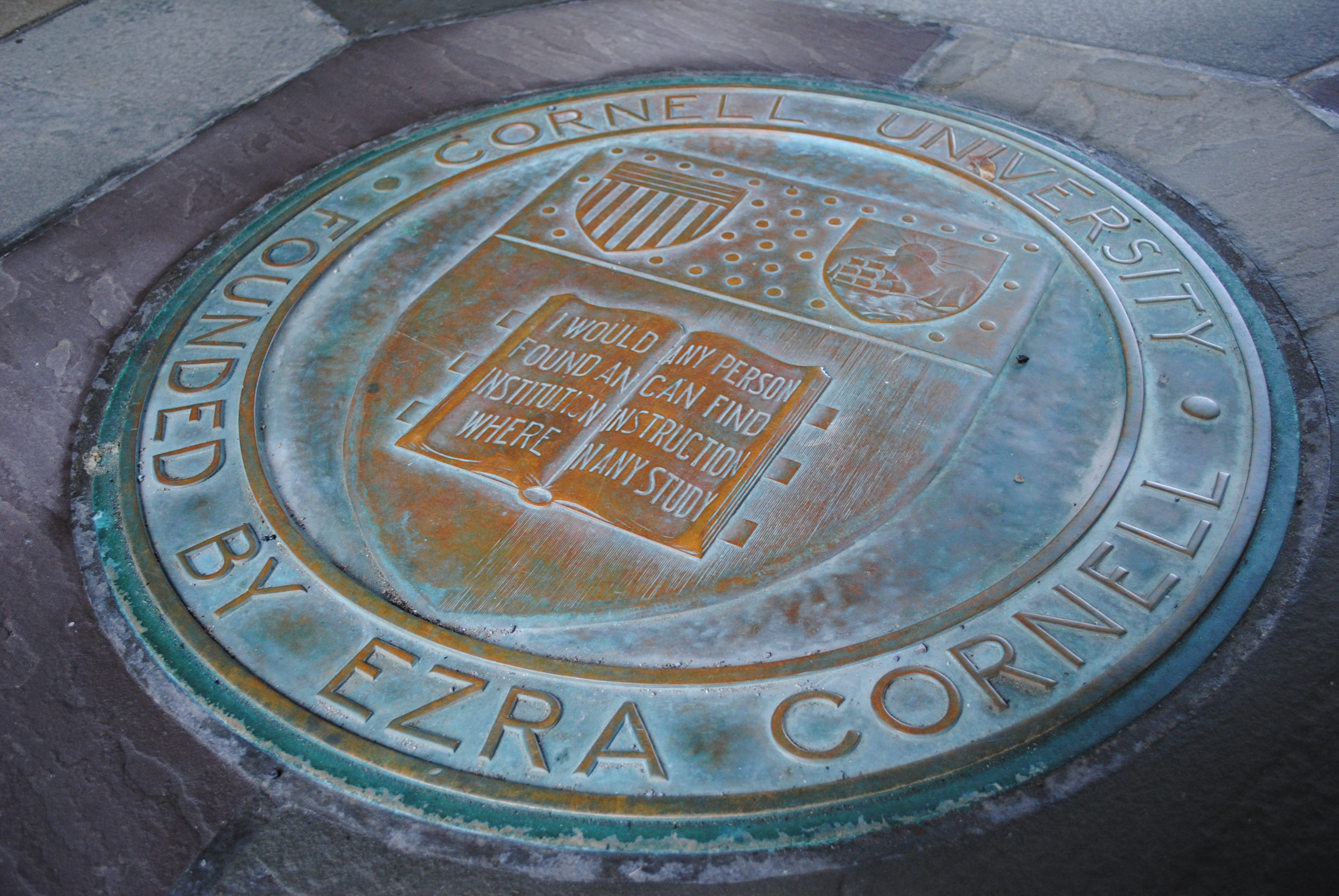
Cornell seal beneath the tower of Myron Taylor Hall

=== Legal Information Institute ===
Cornell Law also is home to the Legal Information Institute (LII), an online provider of public legal information. Started in 1992, it was the first law site developed for the internet. The LII offers all opinions of the United States Supreme Court handed down since 1990, together with over 600 earlier decisions selected for their historic importance. The LII also publishes over a decade of opinions of the New York Court of Appeals, the full United States Code, the UCC, and the Code of Federal Regulations among other resources.

The LII is a public service of Cornell Law School that provides no-cost access to legal research sources online at law.cornell.edu, serving over 47 million unique visitors per year.

The LII also maintains Wex, a free legal dictionary and encyclopedia. Created in collaboration with legal experts, it has been edited and updated since 2020 by the Wex Definitions Team, a group of supervised Cornell Law student editors. The LII Supreme Court Bulletin is a free email and web-based publication that provides legal analysis of upcoming Supreme Court cases and email notifications of Court decisions.

=== Programs ===
- Berger International Legal Studies Program
- Clarke Business Law Institute
- Clarke Center for International and Comparative Legal Studies
- Clarke Initiative for Law and Development in the Middle East and North Africa
- Clarke Program on Corporations and Society
- Clarke Program in East Asian Law and Culture
- Death Penalty Project
- Empirical Legal Studies: Judicial Statistics Project
- Global Center for Women and Justice
- Graduate Legal Studies Program
- ILR-Law School Program on Conflict Resolution
- International Comparative Programs
- Law and Economics Program
- Lay Participation in Law International Research Collaborative
- Migration and Human Rights Program

== People ==
=== Deans ===
Following is a list of the deans of Cornell Law School:

List of Cornell Law School deans
No.	Name	Tenure
1	Douglass Boardman	1887–1891
2	Francis Miles Finch	1891–1903
3	Ernest Wilson Huffcut	1903–1907
4	Frank Irvine	1907–1916
5	Edwin Hamlin Woodruff	1916–1921
6	George Gleason Bogert	1921–1926
7	Charles Kellog Burdick	1926–1937
8	Robert Sproule Stevens	1937–1954
9	Gray Thoron	1956–1963
10	William Ray Forrester	1963–1973
11	Roger C. Cramton	1973–1980
12	Peter William Martin	1980–1988
13	Russell K. Osgood	1988–1998
interim	Charles W. Wolfram	1998–1999
14	Lee E. Teitelbaum	1999–2003
interim	John A. Siliciano	2003
15	Stewart J. Schwab	2004–2014
16	Eduardo Peñalver	2014–2021
17	Jens David Ohlin	2021–present

=== Alumni ===
Cornell Law alumni include business executive and philanthropist Myron Charles Taylor, namesake of the law school building, along with U.S. Secretaries of State Edmund Muskie and William P. Rogers, U.S. Secretary of Housing and Urban Development Samuel Pierce, the first female President of Taiwan, Tsai Ing-wen, federal judge and first female editor-in-chief of a law review Mary H. Donlon, former President of the International Criminal Court Song Sang-Hyun, as well as many members of the U.S. Congress, governors, state attorneys general, U.S. federal and state judges, diplomats and businesspeople.

=== Faculty ===
- Gregory S. Alexander, Property Law and Theory
- Cynthia Grant Bowman, Gender Equality, Women's Rights, Feminist Jurisprudence
- Sherry Colb, Gender Equality, Animal Rights (2008-2022)
- Roger C. Cramton, Administrative Law and Legal Ethics (1973-2017)
- Michael C. Dorf, Constitutional Law (and noted legal blogger)
- Valerie Hans, Law and Social Science
- Robert C. Hockett, Corporate Law and Financial Regulation
- William A. Jacobson, Securities Law
- Alexandra Lahav, Civil Procedure
- Mitchel Lasser, International and Comparative Law
- David Lyons, Philosophy of Law (1979-1995)
- Andrei Marmor, Philosophy of Law
- Peter W. Martin, Law and Technology, Co-founder of the Legal Information Institute
- Saule Omarova, Corporate Governance
- Frank Pasquale, Law and Technology
- Eduardo Peñalver, Property and Land Use
- K. Sabeel Rahman, Law and Political Economy
- Annelise Riles, Comparative Law, International Law, Legal Anthropology
- Stewart J. Schwab, Employment Law
- Emily Sherwin, Jurisprudence, Property, and Remedies
- Steven Shiffrin, First Amendment (1987-2016)
- Lynn Stout, Corporate Law, Securities Regulation, Law and Economics (2012–2018)
- Robert S. Summers, Contract and Commercial Law (1969–2011)
- Chantal J.M. Thomas, Law and Development, International Economic Law
- Stephen Yale-Loehr, Immigration Law
- Irving Younger, Evidence and Trial Advocacy (1974-1981)

== See also ==
- Law of New York (state)
