= Murder of Keith Blakelock =

1985 murder in England

Keith Blakelock QGM
- Born: 28 June 1945; Sunderland, England
- Died: 6 October 1985 (aged 40); Broadwater Farm, Tottenham, England
- Resting place: East Finchley Cemetery
- Spouse: Elizabeth Blakelock (later Johnson)
- Relatives: Mark Blakelock (son); Kevin Blakelock (son); Lee Blakelock (son)
- Police career
- Department: Metropolitan Police Service
- Service years: 1980–1985
- Rank: Police constable, homebeat officer in Muswell Hill, north London
- Badge no.: 176050
- Awards: Queen's Gallantry Medal
- Memorials: Muswell Hill

Keith Henry Blakelock QGM (28 June 1945 – 6 October 1985) was a British police officer who served as a London Metropolitan Police constable. He was murdered on 6 October 1985 during the Broadwater Farm riot in Tottenham. The riot broke out after Cynthia Jarrett died of heart failure during a police search of her home, and took place against a backdrop of unrest in several English cities and a breakdown of relations between the police and some people in the black community.

PC Blakelock had been assigned, on the night of his death, to Serial 502, a unit of 11 constables and one sergeant, dispatched to protect firefighters who were themselves under attack. When the rioters forced the officers back, Blakelock stumbled and fell. Surrounded by a mob of around 50 people, he received over 40 injuries inflicted by machetes or similar weapons, and was found with a six-inch-long (15-centimetre) knife in his neck, buried up to the hilt.

Detectives came under enormous pressure to find those responsible. Faced with a lack of scientific evidence—because for several hours it had not been possible to secure the crime scene—police officers arrested 359 people, interviewed most of them without lawyers, and laid charges based on untaped confessions. Three adults and three youths were charged with the murder; the adults, Winston Silcott, Engin Raghip and Mark Braithwaite (the "Tottenham Three"), were convicted in 1987. A widely supported campaign arose to overturn the convictions, which were quashed in 1991 when scientific testing cast doubt on the authenticity of detectives' notes of an interview in which Silcott appeared to incriminate himself. Two detectives were charged in 1992 with perverting the course of justice and were acquitted in 1994.

Police re-opened the murder inquiry in 1992 and again in 2003. Ten men were arrested in 2010 on suspicion of murder, and in 2013 one of them, Nicholas Jacobs, became the seventh person to be charged with Blakelock's murder, based largely on evidence gathered during the 1992 inquiry. He was found not guilty in April 2014.

Blakelock and the other constables of Serial 502 were awarded the Queen's Gallantry Medal for bravery in 1988.

== Background ==
=== Keith Blakelock ===
Blakelock was born on 28 June 1945 in Sunderland. He joined the Metropolitan Police on 14 November 1980 and was assigned to a response team in Hornsey before becoming a home beat officer in Muswell Hill, north London. At the time of his death, he was married to Elizabeth Blakelock (later Johnson), with three sons, Mark, Kevin and Lee. Lee Blakelock, eight years old when his father died, became a police officer himself, joining Durham Constabulary in 2000. PC Blakelock is buried in East Finchley Cemetery.

=== Broadwater Farm ===
Broadwater Farm, Tottenham, Haringey

Broadwater Farm in Tottenham, in the Borough of Haringey, north London (N17), emerged from the British government's policy from the 1930s onwards of slum clearance, in which poorly maintained terraced houses were bulldozed to make way for high-rise social housing. Built between 1967 and 1973, the Farm consists of 1,063 flats (apartments) in 12 blocks raised on stilts, linked by first-floor outdoor connecting walkways; no homes or shops were built at ground level for fear of flooding from the nearby River Moselle. At the time of Blakelock's death, the estate housed 3,400 people, 49 percent white, 43 percent African-Caribbean.

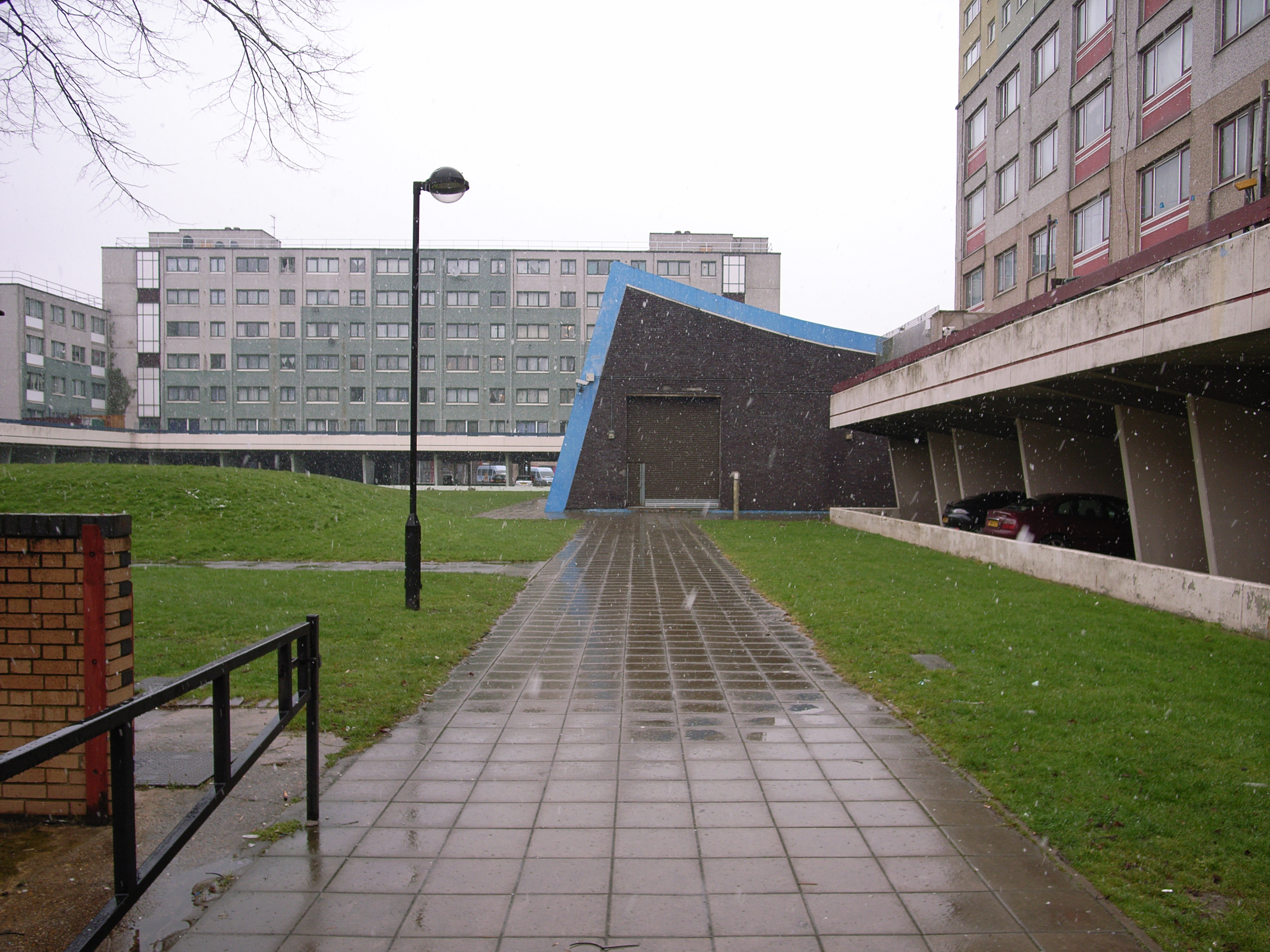
Far right, a Broadwater Farm open parking level, which attracted drug dealers.

British journalist David Rose writes that by 1976 the Farm was already seen as a sink estate, and that by 1980 a Department of the Environment report had suggested demolition, although a regeneration project after the 1985 riots led to improvements. Sir Kenneth Newman, Metropolitan Police Commissioner from 1982 to 1987, regarded the estate as one of London's "symbolic locations", or potential no-go areas, along with Railton Road in Brixton; All Saints Road in Notting Hill; the Notting Hill Carnival; and the Stonebridge Estate in Harlesden. The 1986 Gifford Inquiry into the rioting criticized the police for having adopted this attitude.

Outdoor elevated walkways
- Walkways; Now mostly demolished, they linked the estate so that it could be crossed without descending to street level, making police vulnerable to attack from above. (willfaichneyphotography via Flickr)

The Royal Institute of British Architects blamed the unrest on Haringey Council's policy of "using the estate as a gathering ground for its problem tenants", combined with low rents that left no funds for adequate maintenance. The elevated linked walkways meant that the estate could be crossed without descending to street level. Combined with the ground-level parking spaces beloved of drug dealers, these had turned the estate into what commentators called a "rabbit warren" for criminals, to the point where residents were afraid to leave their homes. From May 1985 police entering the estate regularly faced lumps of concrete, bricks, bottles and beer barrels being thrown at them from the first-floor walkways. Dutch architectural historian Wouter Vanstiphout described the estate as it was at the time of the riots:

[T]here are elevated walkways, there are little stairs that connect them, there are these huge stairwells where the different elevated walkways come together ... there is a huge underground zone that is completely unmonitored, which consists of parking places ... so it's an incredible nest ... one of these typical modernist, multi-level network city constructions that make it extremely difficult for the police to exert any control over it, and it makes the police extremely vulnerable for attacks from behind, underneath, from the top.

=== Social unrest across England ===
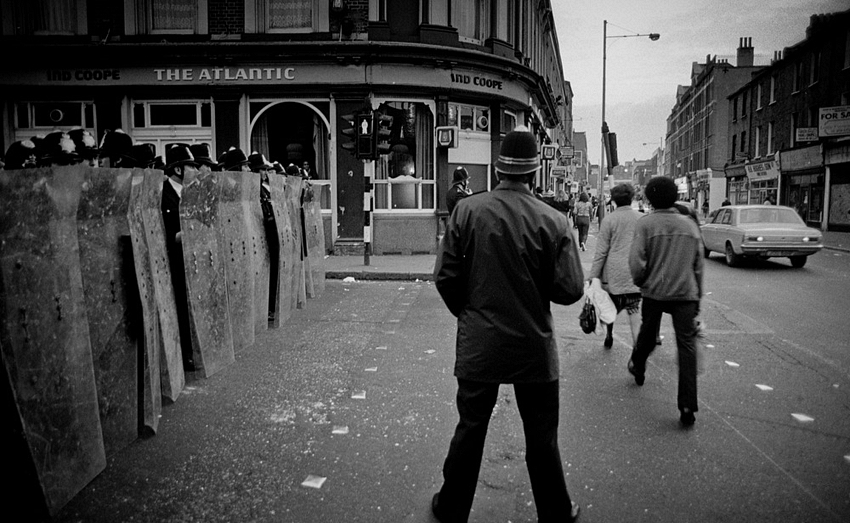
Police line up with shields (left) by Coldharbour Lane during the 1981 Brixton riots.

The riots in which Blakelock died took place within a wave of social unrest across England. Since the 1980 St Pauls riot in Bristol, and particularly since the 1981 Brixton riot in south London, a series of incidents had sparked violent confrontations between black youths and largely white police officers.

On 9 September 1985, a month before Blakelock's murder, the arrest of a black man for a traffic offence triggered the 1985 Handsworth riots in Birmingham; two people were killed. On 28 September, a black woman, Dorothy "Cherry" Groce, was accidentally shot by police while they searched her home in Brixton looking for her son, Michael Groce, who was wanted on suspicion of robbery and firearms offences. Believing she had died in the shooting—in fact, she had survived but was left paralysed from the waist down—a group of protesters gathered outside Brixton police station, sparking the 1985 Brixton riot that saw police lose control of the area for 48 hours. A photojournalist, 29-year-old David Hodge, was killed when a breeze block was dropped on his head while he photographed the looting.

Rumours spread throughout London at the end of September 1985 that more rioting was imminent, including in Bermondsey and the Wood Green shopping centre near Broadwater Farm. On 1 October there were disturbances in Toxteth, Liverpool. The police searched all vehicles entering Broadwater Farm that day; the following day they found a petrol bomb on the estate.

== Broadwater Farm riot ==
=== 5 October - death of Cynthia Jarrett ===
External image
- Cynthia Jarrett; PA Images via Getty Images

At 1:00 pm on 5 October 1985, a young black man, Floyd Jarrett, who lived about one mile (1.5 kilometres) from Broadwater Farm, was arrested by police, having been stopped in a vehicle with an allegedly suspicious car tax disc, on suspicion of being in a stolen car. It was a suspicion that turned out to be groundless, but a decision was made several hours later to search the home of his mother, Cynthia Jarrett, for stolen goods. In the course of the search, she collapsed and died of heart failure. David Rose, a British author and investigative journalist, writes that the pathologist, Walter Somerville, told the inquest that Mrs. Jarrett had a heart condition that meant she probably only had months to live.

The police, without a search warrant, had let themselves into the house using Floyd Jarrett's keys, without knocking or announcing themselves, while his mother and her family were watching television. The family said that an officer had pushed 49-year-old Mrs. Jarrett, causing her to fall. The officer denied this; the police said she had simply collapsed. When it became clear she had stopped breathing, the same officer tried to revive her using mouth-to-mouth resuscitation, to no avail. The pathologist testified at the inquest that the fall may have been a precipitating factor; the jury returned a verdict of accidental death, following the coroner's direction that such a verdict would mean Mrs. Jarrett had been pushed, but perhaps accidentally.

=== 6 October - rioting breaks out ===
Police at the Broadwater Farm riot, with long shields, NATO helmets, and fire-resistant overalls, but no body armour

According to Rose, Cynthia Jarrett's death was "not just a spark but ... a flamethrower aimed at a powder keg". Protesters began to gather outside Tottenham police station, a few hundred yards from Broadwater Farm, around 1:30 am on Sunday morning, 6 October. Four of the station's windows were smashed, but the Jarrett family asked the crowd to disperse. Later that day, two police officers were attacked with bricks and paving stones at the Farm, and a police inspector was attacked in his car.

The next few hours saw some of the most violent rioting the country had experienced. By early evening a crowd of 500 mostly young black men had gathered on the estate, setting fire to cars, throwing petrol bombs and bricks, and dropping concrete blocks and paving stones from the estate's outdoor walkways, knocking several police officers unconscious, despite their NATO helmets. The local council's community relations officer said there was a "shifting convoy of ambulances: as soon as one was loaded up with injured officers, another would move up to take its place".

Four senior officers were in control of police deployment in the area that night: Chief Superintendent Colin Couch, who was the Tottenham Division 4 Superintendent David French, Superintendent William Sinclair, and Chief Inspector John Hambleton. Apart from Blakelock's death, 250 police officers were injured, and two policemen and three journalists—one from the Press Association and two from the BBC—suffered gunshot wounds. At least 30 shots were fired from three firearms, the first time shots had been fired by rioters in Britain. At 9:45 pm the Metropolitan Police Commissioner, Sir Kenneth Newman, authorized the deployment of specialist police armed with plastic bullets and CS gas to be used "as a last resort should all else fail"; it would have been the first use of plastic bullets during a riot in Britain. The unit arrived at 10:20 pm, but the senior officers at the scene refused to use them, apparently to the dismay of junior officers. The rioting continued until the early hours of the morning.

=== Serial 502 ===
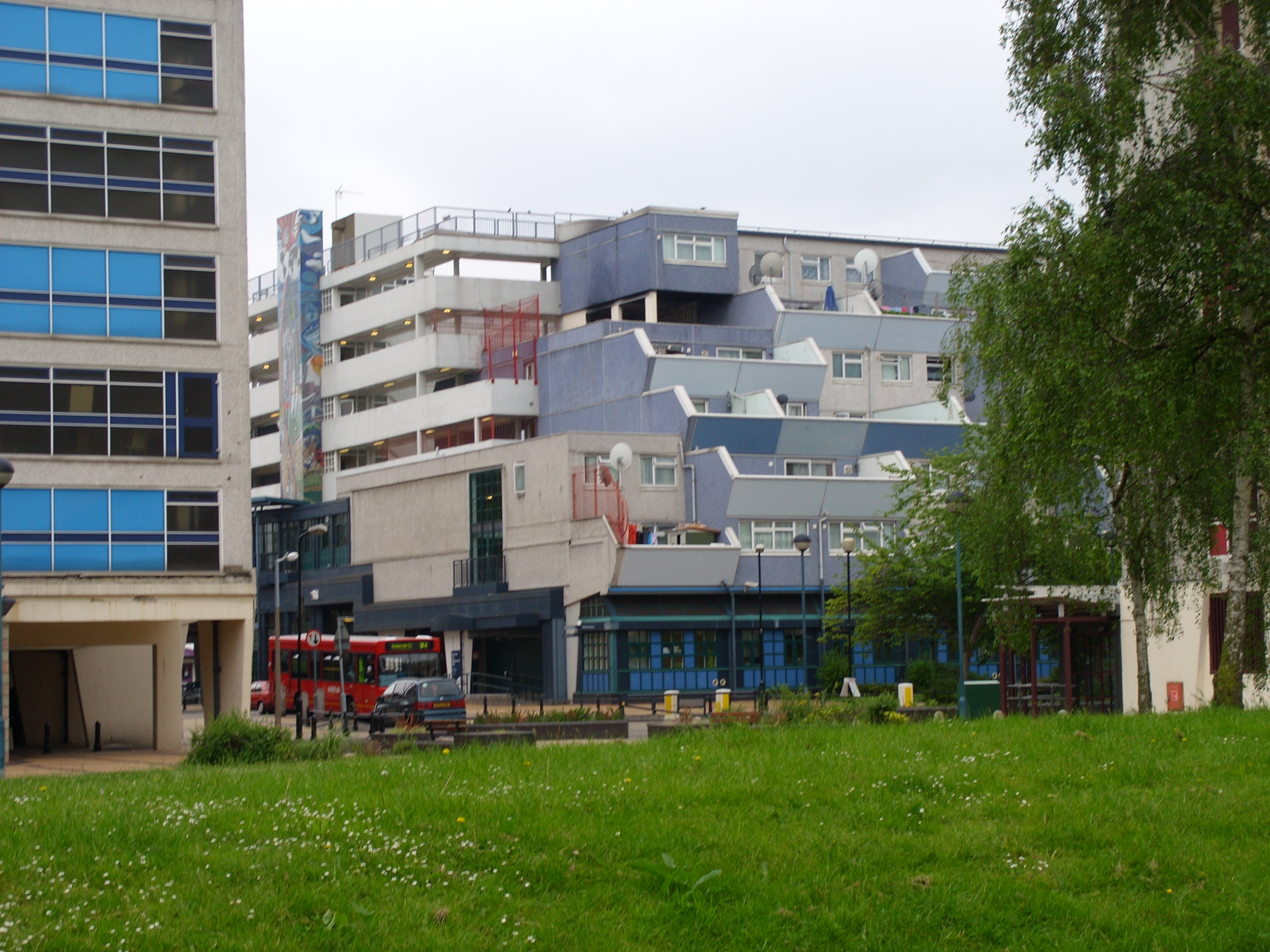
Tangmere block, where Blakelock was killed

External images
- Tangmere block first floor, and the shop (far left) where the fire started
- South stairwell; police and firefighters ran down backwards, with rioters in pursuit.
- Where Blakelock was attacked

Blakelock was assigned on the night to Serial 502, a Metropolitan police unit consisting of a sergeant and 11 constables from Hornsey and Wood Green police stations. A "shield serial" was a unit equipped with shields, NATO helmets and a personnel carrier; expecting trouble, the Metropolitan Police had increased the deployment of these patrols across the capital. Serial 502 consisted of three Scots, three Londoners (including an officer originally from Jamaica), and officers from Cumbria, Gloucestershire, Merseyside, Sunderland, and Yorkshire. (Note: Serial 502 consisted of Sgt David Pengelly and 11 constables: Miles Barton, Keith Blakelock, Robin Clark, Richard "Dick" Coombes, Martyn Howells, Stephen Martin, Kenneth "Gordon" Milne, Ricky Pandya, Maxwell Roberts, Michael Shepherd, and Alan Tappy.)

They arrived at the estate's Gloucester Road entrance in their Sherpa van at around 7:45 pm, armed with truncheons and shields: three long riot shields and six round ones. At 9:30 pm Sgt David Pengelly led the unit onto the estate to protect firefighters who had earlier attended a supermarket fire in the Tangmere block but had been forced out. Tangmere had been built as a ziggurat (with successively receding levels) with a shopping precinct on a mezzanine, as well as flats with balconies. According to PC Richard Coombes, several men shouted from one of the balconies that the supermarket was on fire. He feared that it was a trap.

The firefighters made their way back up an enclosed staircase inside Tangmere with Serial 502 behind them. Dozens of rioters suddenly appeared at the top of the stairs. Pengelly told them the police were helping firefighters put out a fire, then they would leave. Suddenly the rioters began blowing whistles, throwing bottles and hacking at the police shields with machetes. Pengelly ordered the officers and firefighters to retreat. They were forced to run backwards down the unlit narrow staircase, fearful of tripping over the fire hoses, which had been flat before but were now full of water. PC Coombes, armed with just a short truncheon, recalled that the noise—"Kill the pigs!"—was deafening, and he could barely see through the scratched Perspex visor on his helmet.

=== Attack on Blakelock ===
Front and back of Blakelock's overalls. Each piece of tape represents a stabbing or cutting wound.

"In total, 230 police officers were injured and one, PC Keith Blakelock, was killed"—The Daily Telegraph

There were rioters at the bottom of the stairs too, wearing masks or crash helmets, and carrying knives, machetes, baseball bats, bricks, petrol bombs and paving stones. The bombs started exploding, the paving stones were thrown at the officers' helmets, and the riot shields were the only defence against the machetes. As the firefighters and police ran out of the stairwell toward a car park and a patch of grass, one of the firefighters, Divisional Fire Officer Trevor Stratford, saw that Blakelock had tripped: "He just stumbled and went down and they were upon him. It was just mob hysteria. ... There were about 50 people on him."

The rioters removed Blakelock's protective helmet, which was never found. The pathologist, David Bowen, found 54 holes in Blakelock's overalls, and 40 stabbing or slashing injuries, eight of them to his head, caused by a weapon such as a machete, axe or sword. A six-inch-long knife was buried in his neck up to the hilt. His body was covered in marks from having been kicked or stamped on. His hands and arms were badly cut, and he had lost several fingers trying to defend himself. There were 14 stab wounds on his back, one on the back of his right thigh, and six on his face. Stabbing injuries to his armpits had penetrated his lungs. His head had been turned to one side and his jawbone smashed by a blow that left a six-inch gash across the right side of his head. Bowen said the force of this blow had been "almost as if to sever his head", which gave rise to the view that an attempt had been made to decapitate him. (Note: Terry Lloyd (News at Ten, ITN, 8 October 1985): "Witnesses say that having wrenched his riot helmet from him, his attackers then repeatedly stabbed him in the body, and continuously hacked away at his neck. PC Blakelock lost several fingers as he tried to defend himself before the attackers fled ... Tonight Scotland Yard confirmed that the injuries were so grievous that it did appear the men were trying to behead the officer.")

A second group surrounded PC Coombes, who sustained a five-inch-long cut to his face, had his neck slit open, and was left with broken upper and lower jaws. As of 2016 he was still suffering the effects of the attack, which the police regard as attempted murder, including constant pain, poor hearing and eyesight, epileptic fits, nightmares, and a memory so poor that he was left unable to read a book or drive. A third constable, Michael Shepherd, was hit by an iron spike; Shepherd collapsed next to Coombes and placed his shield over him to protect Coombes from the crowd, who were kicking and hitting them both. Several officers and firefighters turned and ran back toward the crowd to try to save Blakelock and Coombes.

Sergeant Pengelly, in charge of the serial, turned and ran at the mob, driving them off. Couch, Mr Stratford, and other officers ran back too and managed to pull PC Blakelock away, but by then he had sustained multiple stab wounds and within minutes Blakelock was near death.

Blakelock was taken by ambulance to the North Middlesex Hospital but died on the way. Coombes was taken to hospital by fire engine. Stratford was left with a spinal injury, and 19-year-old PC Maxwell Roberts had been stabbed. Pengelly said in 2010 that, when the other officers got back to the safety of their van, "We just sat there, numb with shock, and life was never the same again for any of us."

== First investigation ==
=== Media response ===
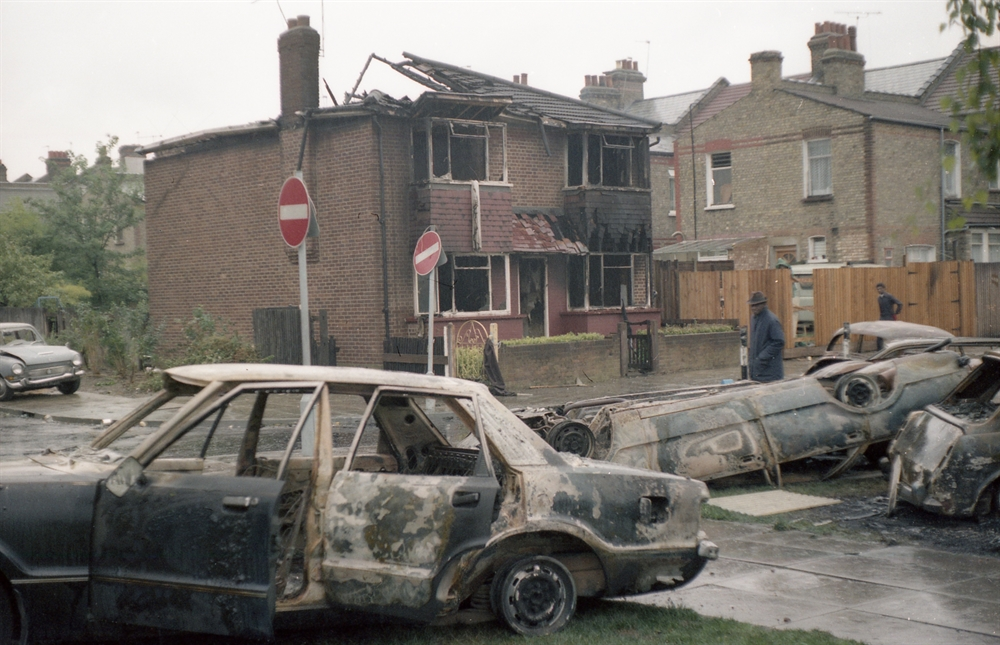
Broadwater Farm, 7 October 1985

Day After The Riot 7 October 1985
- Front page, The Guardian
- Photos, Julian Herbert via Getty Images
- Photos and Photos by Andy Hosie via Mirrorpix, Getty Images
- Photos by Alisdair Macdonald via Mirrorpix, Getty Images
- large police occupation

Rose writes that there was a racist media frenzy after the killing, placing intense external pressure on detectives to solve the case. The Sun newspaper reportedly compared the Labour leader of Haringey Council and Labour's prospective candidate for Tottenham, Bernie Grant—who had immigrated from Guyana in 1963—to an ape, writing that he had spoken to reporters while, in Rose's words, "peeling a banana and juggling an orange". Grant caused uproar with his comments after the killing. He was largely misquoted by hostile reporters that "the police got a bloody good hiding" – his actual words were "the youth think they gave the police a bloody good hiding". and "Maybe it was a policeman who stabbed another policeman." Censured by Neil Kinnock, (Note: Neil Kinnock wrote to Bernie Grant around 12 October 1985: "What is required and what the Government has signally failed to provide is effective action to get at the roots of the violence. I understand that consideration is being given by your council to attempting to withhold the rates precept paid to the police. The withholding of the precept would be a fruitless course of action that would benefit no one. "It cannot help anyone either to allocate blame for tragedy and uproar exclusively to the police or to be dismissive of a horrific and brutal murder that cannot be justified on any grounds whatsoever.") then Labour leader, Grant later described the violence as "inexcusable".

The Metropolitan Police Commissioner, Kenneth Newman, told reporters that groups of Trotskyists and anarchists had orchestrated the violence, a theme picked up by the Daily Telegraph and others. Falling for a story from media hoaxer Rocky Ryan, the Daily Express reported on 8 October 1985 that a "Moscow-trained hit squad gave orders as mob hacked PC Blakelock to death", alleging that "crazed left-wing extremists" trained in Moscow and Libya had coordinated the riots.

There was also internal pressure on detectives from the rank and file, who saw their superior officers as sharing the blame for Blakelock's death. The Police Federation's journal, Police, argued that senior officers had pursued a policy at Broadwater Farm of avoiding confrontation at all costs, and that "community policing" had led to compromises with criminals, rather than a focus on upholding the law. As a result, the journal wrote, officers had failed to appreciate the seriousness of the situation that had developed on the estate.

=== Det Ch Supt Graham Melvin ===
Detective Chief Superintendent Graham Melvin of the Serious Crime Squad was placed in charge of the investigation a few hours after the killing, at 2:00 am on 7 October. With 150 officers assigned full-time, the inquiry became the largest in the history of the Metropolitan Police. Born in Halifax in 1941, Melvin had joined the Metropolitan Police in 1960, then the Criminal Investigation Department. He had studied at Bramshill Police College, served with the Flying Squad, and was known for having solved several notorious cases, including that of Kenneth Erskine, the Stockwell Strangler. He became a detective chief superintendent in March 1985, when he joined the elite International and Organised Crime Squad (SO1).

=== Interviews ===
Melvin's first problem was that there was no forensic evidence. Senior officers had not allowed the estate to be sealed off immediately after the attack, which meant that the crime scene had not been secured. Witnesses and those directly involved had been allowed to leave without giving their names, and objects that might have held fingerprints had not been collected. Police had not been allowed into the estate in great numbers until 4 am on 7 October, by which time much of the evidence had disappeared. Whatever remained was removed during Haringey Council's clean-up operation.

Melvin therefore resorted to arresting suspects—including juveniles, some of them regarded as vulnerable—and holding them for days without access to lawyers. Of the 359 people arrested in 1985 and 1986 in connection with the riot, 94 were interviewed in the presence of a lawyer. Many of the confessions that resulted, whether directly about the murder, or about having taken part in the rioting, were made before the lawyer was given access to the interviewee, according to Rose.

When people did confess to even a minor role in the rioting, such as throwing a few stones, they were charged with affray. One resident told the 1986 Gifford Inquiry into the rioting: "You would go to bed and you would just lie there and you would think, are they going to come and kick my door, what's going to happen to my children? ... It was that horrible fear that you lived with day by day, knowing they could come and kick down your door and hold you for hours." The inquiry heard that 9,165 police officers were either deployed on the estate or held in reserve between 10 and 14 October 1985. Thus, argues Rose, the police created, or at least intensified, a climate of fear in which witnesses were afraid to step forward.

Melvin defended his decision to hold people without access to legal advice by arguing that lawyers, unwittingly or otherwise, might pass information they had gleaned during interviews to other suspects. He said under cross-examination during the 1987 murder trial that, in his view, "the integrity of some firms of solicitors left a lot to be desired"; he believed solicitors were being retained by people who had an interest in learning what other suspects had said. The Crown prosecutor, Roy Amlot QC, told the court during the first trial that the police had one effective weapon, namely that suspects did not know who else had spoken to police and what they had said, and that "the use of that weapon by the police was legitimate and effective".

=== (1985–1986) Murder charges ===
==== Mark Pennant ====
Mark Pennant, aged 15, was arrested on 9 October 1985 and charged with murder two days later, the first to be charged. Born in England to West-Indian parents, Pennant had been raised in the West Indies until he was nine, after which he returned to the UK; he was diagnosed with learning difficulties and was attending a special school. Arrested and handcuffed at school, he was taken to Wood Green Police Station and interviewed six times over the course of two days, with a teacher in attendance. His mother was not told that he had been taken into custody, and the police reportedly told him that she had refused to help him. He told the police that he had cut Blakelock and kicked him twice, and he named Winston Silcott as the ringleader, and several others, including another juvenile, Mark Lambie. When charged with the murder, he asked the teacher who accompanied him: "Does that mean I have to go and live with you?"

==== Jason Hill ====
Jason Hill, a 13-year-old white boy who lived on Broadwater Farm, was seen looting from a store in the Tangmere block during the riot, near where Blakelock was killed. He was arrested on 13 October 1985 and taken to Leyton Police Station, where he was held for three days without access to a lawyer. He reported being kept in a very hot cell, which he said made sleeping and even breathing difficult. His clothes and shoes were removed for forensic tests and he was interviewed wearing only underpants and a blanket, the latter of which by the third day of detention was stained with his own vomit. Hyacinth Moody of the Haringey Community Relations Council sat in as an "appropriate adult"; she was criticized by the judge for having failed to intervene.

Over the course of several interviews, Hill told police that he had witnessed the attack and named Silcott and others, including Mark Lambie. He described almost a ritualistic killing and said that Silcott—whom he called "Sticks"—had forced him to make his "mark" on Blakelock with a sword. According to David Rose, Hill described inflicting injuries to Blakelock's chest and leg that did not match the autopsy report. After he had cut Blakelock, Hill said, Silcott told him he was cool and asked what he had seen. Hill said he had replied, "Nothing", and that Silcott had said, "Well, you can go." Hill said the aim of the attack had been to decapitate Blakelock and put his head on a stick. In 1991 he told Rose that, throughout the interview, the police had said, "Go on, admit it, you had a stab," and "It was Sticks, wasn't it?" He said they had threatened to keep him in the station for two weeks and said he would never see his family again. "They could have told me it was Prince Charles and I would have said it was him."

==== Mark Lambie ====
Mark Lambie, aged 14, was the third juvenile to be charged with murder. He was named by Mark Pennant and Jason Hill, and was interviewed with his father and a solicitor present. Lambie admitted to having taken part in the rioting, but denied involvement in the murder. One witness said during the trial that he had seen Lambie force his way through the crowd to reach Blakelock, although the testimony was discredited; the witness was caught in several lies and admitted he had offered evidence only to avoid a prison sentence. (Seventeen years later, in May 2002, Lambie was jailed for 12 years for kidnap and blackmail after detaining and torturing two men; newspapers described him at that time as a Yardie gang leader.)

==== Winston Silcott ====
===== Background =====
- Winston Silcott (right) in 2014, with Mark Braithwaite (centre), another member of the Tottenham Three, and Stafford Scott, co-founder of the Broadwater Farm Defence Campaign

Overview
- Born: 1959, London's East End
- Ethnicity: African-Caribbean
- Education: William Foster School, Tottenham
- Occupation in 1985: Ran a greengrocer's shop
- Criminal charge(s): Burglary (1977), wounding (1979), murder of Lennie McIntosh (acquitted 1980), possession (1983), obstruction (1984), murder of Anthony Smith (convicted 1986), murder of Keith Blakelock (convicted 1987, overturned 1991)

According to David Rose, a former detective inspector called the Blakelock investigation a "pre-scientific inquiry, it was all about how to get Winston Silcott convicted, not discovering who killed Keith Blakelock." By the time of the murder, local police saw Silcott as the "biggest mafioso in Tottenham ... running the mugging gangs, paying them with drugs", according to another former senior officer in Tottenham.

Silcott was 26 years old when he was arrested, the oldest of the six charged with murder. He was born in Tottenham in 1959; his parents, both Seventh-day Adventists, had arrived in England from Montserrat two years earlier. He told Rose that he had experienced racism throughout his entire upbringing, particularly from the police. After leaving school at 15, he took a series of low-paying jobs and in 1976 began breaking into houses. The following year he was convicted of nine counts of burglary and sent to borstal for a few months, and in 1979 he was sentenced to six months for wounding. In September 1980 he stood trial for the murder of 19-year-old Leonard "Lennie" McIntosh, a postal worker, who was stabbed and killed at a party in Muswell Hill on 12 January of that year. The first trial resulted in a hung jury; a second trial saw him acquitted.

In 1983, Silcott was given a government grant to open a greengrocer's on the deck of the Tangmere block of Broadwater Farm. More convictions followed: in October that year he was fined for possessing a flick knife and in March 1984 for obstructing police. In 1985 he made the news when he told Diana, Princess of Wales, who was on an official visit to Broadwater Farm, that she should not have come without bringing jobs, which The Sun interpreted as a threat.

In December 1984 Silcott was arrested for the murder of a 22-year-old boxer, Anthony Smith, at a party in Hackney. Smith had been slashed more than once on his face, there were two wounds to his abdomen, a lung had been lacerated and his aorta cut. Silcott was charged with the murder in May 1985 and was out on bail when Blakelock was killed in October of that year. At first, he told police he had not known Smith and had not been at the party, although at trial he acknowledged having been there. He said Smith had started punching him, and that he had pushed Smith back but had not been carrying a knife. Silcott was convicted of Smith's murder in February 1986, while awaiting trial for the Blakelock murder, and was sentenced to life imprisonment; he was released in 2003 after serving 17 years. After the conviction he told his lawyer he had indeed known Smith, that there had been bad blood between them, and that he had stabbed the man in self-defence because one of Smith's friends had had a knife.

===== Disputed interview =====
Known as "Sticks" locally, Silcott was living in the Martlesham block of Broadwater Farm at the time of the riots, and was running his greengrocer's shop in the Tangmere block, the block near the spot where Blakelock was killed. He told David Rose in 2004 that he had been in the Tangmere block on the night of the death, and had stopped someone from throwing a scaffolding pole through the window of his shop. A friend of his, Pam, had then invited him to her apartment to keep him out of trouble. He told Rose: "And look, I'm on bail for a murder. I know I'm stupid, but I'm not that stupid. There's helicopters, police photographers everywhere. All I could think about was that I didn't want to lose my bail." He said he had first learned of Blakelock's death when he heard cheering in the apartment he was staying in, in response to a news report about it.

Silcott was arrested for Blakelock's murder on 12 October 1985, six days after the riot; he was interviewed five times over 24 hours; Det Ch Supt Melvin asked the questions and Det Insp Maxwell Dingle took the notes. During the first four interviews, Silcott stayed mostly silent and refused to sign the detectives' notes, but during the fifth interview on 13 October, when Melvin said he knew Silcott had struck Blakelock with a machete or sword, his demeanour changed, according to the notes.

The notes show him asking: "Who told you that?" When the detectives said they had witnesses, he reportedly said: "They are only kids. No one is going to believe them." The notes say he walked around the interview room with tears in his eyes, saying: "You cunts, you cunts", and "Jesus, Jesus", then: "You ain't got enough evidence. Those kids will never go to court. You wait and see. No one else will talk to you. You can't keep me away from them." The notes show him saying of the murder weapons: "You're too slow, man, they gone." He was at that point charged with murder, to which he reportedly responded: "They won't give evidence against me." It was this interview that led to Silcott's conviction for murder being overturned. According to a scientist who conducted forensic tests on the original interview notes, the detectives' notes from the portion of the interview in which Silcott appeared to incriminate himself had been inserted after the other interview notes were written.

==== Engin Raghip ====
- Engin Raghip (right), with Mark Braithwaite

Overview
- Born: c. 1966, North London
- Ethnicity: Turkish-Cypriot
- Occupation in 1985: Mechanic
- Criminal charge(s): Theft, burglary (c. 1984), murder of Keith Blakelock (1987, overturned 1991)

Nineteen-year-old Engin Raghip, of Turkish–Cypriot descent, was arrested on 24 October 1985 after a friend mentioned his name to police, the only time anyone had linked him to the murder. During his trial, the court heard from an expert that Raghip was "in the middle of the mildly mentally handicapped range", although this testimony was withheld from the jury. His mental impairment became a key issue during his successful appeal in 1991 in R v Raghip and others when the court accepted that it had rendered his confession unsafe.

Raghip's parents had moved from Cyprus to England in 1956. Raghip left school at age 15, illiterate, and by the time of the murder had three convictions, one for burglary and two for stealing cars. He had a common-law wife, Sharon Daly, with whom he had a two-year-old boy, and he worked occasionally as a mechanic. He had little connection with Broadwater Farm, although he lived in nearby Wood Green and had gone to the Farm with two friends to watch the riot, he said. One of those friends, John Broomfield, gave an interview to the Daily Mirror on 23 October 1985, boasting about his involvement. When Broomfield was arrested, he implicated Raghip. Broomfield was later convicted of an unrelated murder.

At the time of Raghip's arrest, he had been drinking and smoking cannabis for several days, and his common-law wife had just left him, taking their son with her. He was held for two days without representation, first speaking to a solicitor on the third day, who said he had found Raghip distressed and disoriented. He was interviewed by Det Sgt van Thal and Det Insp John Kennedy ten times over a period of four days. He made several incriminating statements, first that he had thrown stones, then during the second interview that he had seen the attack on Blakelock. During the third, he said he had spoken to Silcott about the murder, and that Silcott owned a hammer with a hook on one side. After the fifth interview he was charged with affray, and during the sixth, he described the attack on Blakelock: "It was like you see in a film, a helpless man with dogs on him. It was just like that, it was really quick." He did not sign this interview, Rose writes, and after it, he vomited.

During a seventh interview the next day, Raghip described noises he said Blakelock had made during the attack. During the eighth interview, he said he had armed himself that night with a broom handle and had tried to get close to what was happening to Blakelock, but there were too many people around him: "I had a weapon when I was running toward the policeman, a broom handle." He said he might have kicked or hit him had he been able to get close enough. Rose writes that Raghip also offered the order in which Blakelock's attackers had launched the assault. He was held for another two days, released on bail, and then charged with murder six weeks later, in December 1985, under the doctrine of common purpose.

==== Mark Braithwaite ====
- Mark Braithwaite, speaking in April 2014, from 00:09:25.

Overview
- Born: c. 1967, London
- Occupation in 1985: Rapper, disc jockey
- Criminal charge(s): Murder of Keith Blakelock (1987, overturned 1991)

Aged 18 when Blakelock was killed, Mark Braithwaite was a rapper and disc jockey living with his parents in Islington, London, N1. He had a girlfriend who lived on Broadwater Farm, with whom he had a child. On 16 January 1986, three months after the murder, his name was mentioned for the first time to detectives by a man they had arrested, Bernard Kinghorn. Kinghorn told them he had seen Braithwaite, whom he said he knew only by sight, stab Blakelock with a kitchen knife. Kinghorn later withdrew the allegation, telling the BBC three years later that it had been false.

Braithwaite was taken to Enfield Police Station and interviewed by Det Sgt Dermot McDermott and Det Con Colin Biggar. He was held for three days and was at first denied access to a lawyer, on the instruction of Det Ch Supt Melvin. He was interviewed eight times over the first two days and with a lawyer present four times on the third. During the first 30 hours of his detention he had nothing to eat, and said in court—as did several other suspects—that the heat in the cells was oppressive, making it difficult to breathe.

He at first denied being anywhere near the Farm, then during interview four said he had been there and had thrown stones, and during interview five said he had been at the Tangmere block, but had played no role in the murder. During interview six, he said he had hit Blakelock with an iron bar in the chest and leg. Rose writes that there were no such injuries on Blakelock's body. In a seventh interview, he said he had hit a police officer, but that it was not Blakelock. On the basis of this confession evidence, he was charged with murder.

=== (1987) Trial: R v Silcott and others ===
R v Silcott and others
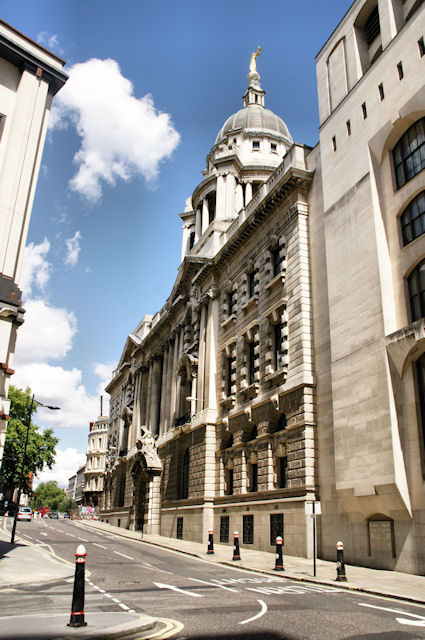
- Court: Central Criminal Court (Old Bailey)
- Decided: March 1987

Case history
- Subsequent actions: R v Raghip and others Silcott v Commissioner of Police of the Metropolis

Court membership
- Judge sitting: Sir Derek Hodgson

Of the 359 men and youths arrested, 159 were charged, including with affray and throwing petrol bombs, and 88 were convicted. According to The Times, the accused were "divided almost equally between black and white". Five defendants were 29 or older; most were teenagers or in their early 20s. The youngest was aged 12. The trial of the six accused of murder—Silcott, Raghip and Braithwaite, the adults; and Pennant, Hill and Lambie, the youths—began in court number two of the Old Bailey on 19 January 1987 in front of Mr Justice Hodgson. All were charged with murder, riot, and affray; Lambie was also charged with throwing petrol bombs.

The jury consisted of eight white men, two black women and two white women. They were not told that it was Silcott's fourth murder trial, that he had been out on bail for the murder of Anthony Smith when Blakelock was killed, or that he had subsequently been convicted of that murder. Silcott's barrister, Barbara Mills, a future Director of Public Prosecutions, decided that he should not take the stand to avoid exposing him to questions about his previous convictions. The effort to avoid introducing the conviction for the murder of Anthony Smith worked against Silcott too. It meant that the jury could not be told that he had signed on for his bail at Tottenham police station at around 7 pm on the evening of Blakelock's death. This was when witnesses had placed Silcott at a Broadwater Youth Association meeting, making inflammatory speeches against the police.

External images
- The Sun published this image on the second day of the trial, a "most gross contempt", according to the judge speaking years later.
- The Guardian, 19 March 1987, reporting the convictions

Roy Amlot QC told the court that Blakelock had been stabbed 40 times by at least two knives and a machete. There were eight injuries to his head, and one of the weapons had penetrated his jawbone. In the view of the prosecution, the killers had intended to decapitate him and place his head on a pole. The press coverage of the trial included the publication on day two, by The Sun, of a notorious close-up of a half-smiling Silcott, one that "created a monster to stalk the nightmares of Middle England", as journalist Kurt Barling put it. Silcott said he had been asleep in a police cell when it was taken; he said he was woken up, held in a corridor with his arms pinned against a wall and photographed, and that the expression on his face was one of fear. Its publication constituted "the most gross contempt", according to the trial judge speaking to David Rose in 1992. No action was taken against the newspaper.

The judge dismissed the charges against the youths because they had been detained without access to parents or a lawyer; in the absence of the jury, the judge was highly critical of the police on that point. Four armoured police vehicles waited in Tottenham as the jury deliberated for three days. They returned on 19 March 1987 with a unanimous guilty verdict against Silcott, Raghip and Braithwaite; the men were sentenced to life imprisonment, with a recommendation that Silcott serve at least 30 years. One black female juror fainted when the verdicts were read out. Rose writes that the tabloids knew no restraint, writing about the beasts of Broadwater Farm, hooded animals and packs of savages, with the old jail-cell image of Silcott published above captions such as "smile of evil".

== Campaign on behalf of the "Tottenham Three" ==
=== Broadwater Farm Defence Campaign ===
A campaign to free the "Tottenham Three" gathered pace, organized by the Broadwater Farm Defence Campaign. They published an 18-page report in 1987 by Margaret Burnham and Lennox Hinds, two American law professors who had attended part of the trial, and who wrote that Silcott's conviction "represents a serious miscarriage of justice". Rose writes that the New Statesman and Time Out wrote sympathetic pieces, and MPs and trade unionists were lobbied. In May 1989 the London School of Economics students' union elected Silcott as the college's honorary president, to the dismay of its director and governors. Silcott resigned shortly afterwards, saying he did not want the students to become scapegoats.

=== (1988) Raghip's application for leave to appeal ===
Engin Raghip's solicitor was by now Gareth Peirce—who had represented the Guildford Four and Birmingham Six—and his barrister Michael Mansfield. Peirce applied for leave to appeal. She began to explore Raghip's mental state, arguing that his confession could not be relied upon, and arranged for him to be examined by Dr. Gísli Guðjónsson of the Institute of Psychiatry, a specialist in suggestibility. Gísli concluded that Raghip was unusually suggestible, with a mental age of between 10 and 11. Silcott was again represented by Barbara Mills and Braithwaite by Steven Kamlish. Mills noted the lack of photographic or scientific evidence, and argued that Silcott would have been unlikely to stop firefighters from extinguishing a fire on the deck of the Tangmere block, given that he was renting a shop there.

Lord Lane, then Lord Chief Justice of England, dismissed the applications on 13 December 1988, arguing of Raghip that the jury had had ample opportunity to form its own opinion of him. Amnesty International criticized the decision, pointing to the problems with confessions made in the absence of a lawyer, and was criticized in turn by Home Secretary Douglas Hurd, who said Amnesty had abandoned its impartiality.

There was disquiet that the application to appeal had failed. During a BBC Newsnight discussion, Lord Scarman, a former Law Lord, said the convictions ought to be overturned. Gareth Peirce obtained another psychologist's report about Raghip and, supported by Raghip's MP Michael Portillo, asked the Home Secretary to review the case. She also submitted an application to the European Court of Human Rights, arguing that the way Raghip had been interviewed breached the European Convention on Human Rights. In December 1990 Home Secretary Kenneth Baker referred Raghip's case back to the Court of Appeal.

=== (1990) Electrostatic detection analysis ===
In parallel with the efforts of Pierce, Silcott's lawyers had requested access in November 1990 to his original interview notes, so that the seven pages from his crucial fifth interview—the notes he said were fabricated—could be submitted for an electrostatic detection analysis (ESDA). The test can identify a small electrostatic charge left on a page when the page above it is written on; in this way, the test's developers say, the chronological integrity of interview notes can be determined.

In Silcott's case, according to the scientist who conducted the ESDA test, Robert Radley, the notes from the section of the fifth interview in which Silcott appeared to incriminate himself had been inserted after the other notes were written. The seventh and final page of the fifth interview, where the participants would normally sign, was missing. The ESDA test suggested that, on the third to sixth pages of the interview, no impressions had been left from previous pages, although these earlier impressions appeared throughout the rest of the notes. According to Will Bennett in The Independent, the test "also revealed an imprint of a different page five from the one submitted in evidence which was clearly the same interview with Silcott but in which he made no implicit admissions". In addition to this, David Baxendale, a Home Office forensic scientist who was asked to investigate by Essex police, said that the paper on which the disputed notes were written came from a different batch of paper from the rest of the interview.

The disputed section of the interview had been written down by Det Insp Maxwell Dingle. It said that, when the police told Silcott that they had witness statements saying he had attacked Blakelock, Silcott replied: "They are only kids. No one is going to believe them"; he reportedly said later: "Those kids will never go to court, you wait and see." As a result of the ESDA test evidence, the Home Secretary added Silcott and Braithwaite to Raghip's appeal.

=== (1991) Appeal: R v Raghip and others ===
R v Raghip and others
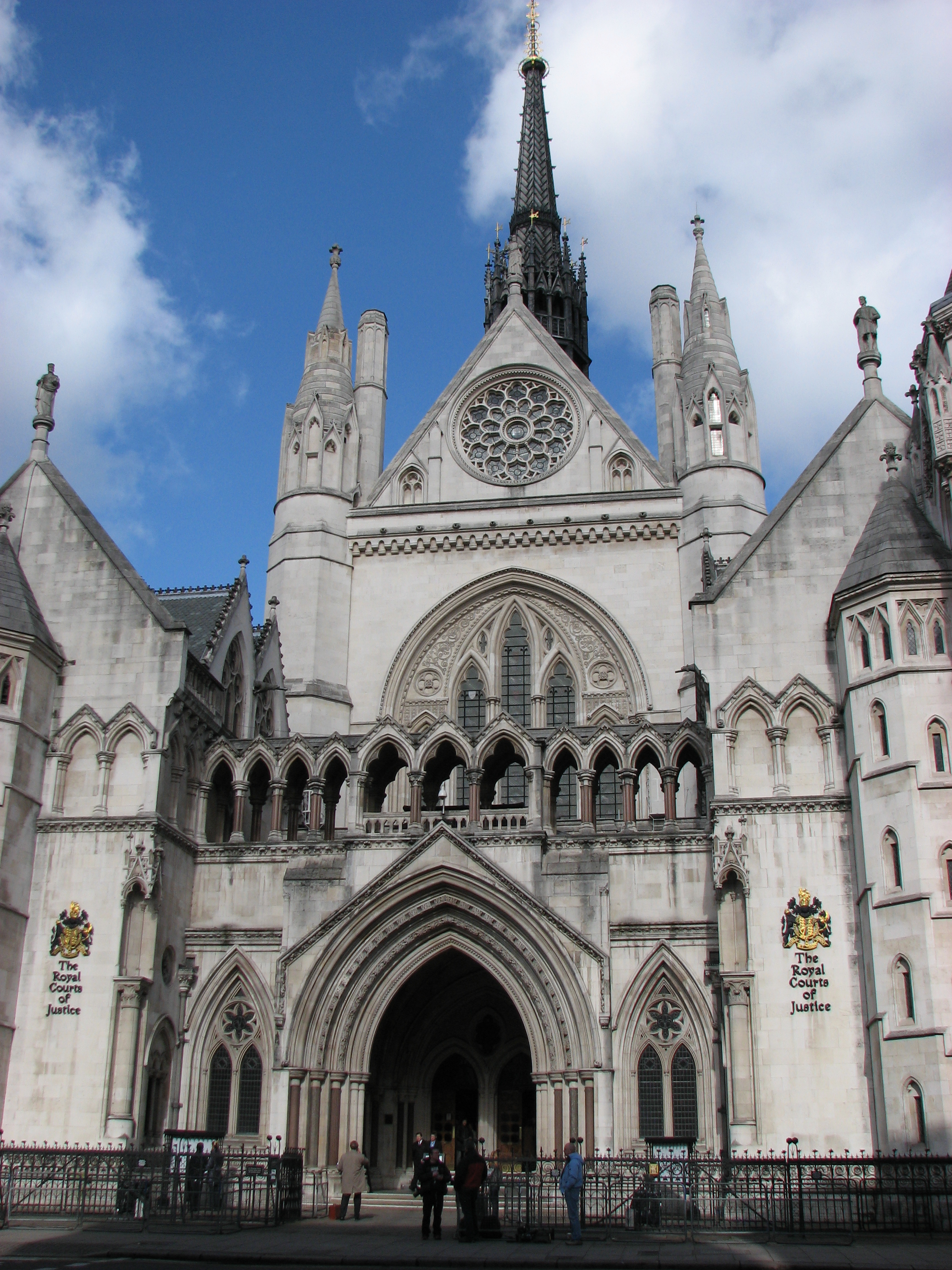
- Court: Royal Courts of Justice
- Decided: 25 November 1991

Case history
- Appealed from: R v Silcott and others
- Subsequent actions: Silcott v Commissioner of Police of the Metropolis; R v Melvin and Dingle

Court membership
- Judges sitting: Lord Justice Farquharson, Mr Justice Alliott, Mr Justice Cresswell

The Court of Appeal heard Silcott's appeal on 25 November 1991 and took just 90 minutes to overturn the conviction, delivering its 74-page decision on 5 December. Raghip and Braithwaite's appeal was heard a few days later and was also swiftly overturned. R v Raghip and others is regarded as a landmark ruling because it recognized that "interrogative suggestibility" might make a confession unreliable.

The court heard that Silcott's interview notes were contaminated, and that Raghip's suggestibility and Braithwaite's having been denied a lawyer rendered their confessions unreliable. The Crown prosecutor, Roy Amlot, conceded that the apparent contamination rendered all three convictions unsafe: "[W]e would not have gone on against Braithwaite, against Raghip, against any other defendants, having learned of the apparent dishonesty of the officer in charge of the case. I say that because the Crown has to depend on the honesty and integrity of officers in a case ... The impact is obviously severe." Rose writes that the statement was "one of the more sensational speeches in English legal history."

Braithwaite and Raghip were released immediately. Silcott remained in jail for the 1984 murder of Anthony Smith. He received £17,000 compensation in 1991 for his conviction in the Blakelock case, and in 1995 was offered up to £200,000 in legal aid to sue the police for conspiracy to pervert the course of justice. The Metropolitan Police settled out of court in 1999, awarding him £50,000 for false imprisonment and malicious prosecution. He was released on licence in October 2003 having served 17 years for Smith's murder.

== Second investigation and detectives' trial ==
=== (1992–1994) Commander Perry Nove ===
A second criminal inquiry was opened in 1992 under Commander Perry Nove, who appealed for help from the local black community. In January 1993 the Crown Prosecution Service (CPS) drew a distinction between the "kickers and the stabbers"—those who had kicked or punched Blakelock and those who had used weapons—and decided that the former could be called as witnesses in exchange for immunity from prosecution. By the end of 1993, Rose writes, Nove had identified nine suspects against whom at least two eyewitnesses would testify, supported by evidence such as photographs. The suspect list included Nicholas Jacobs, who in 2014 would be tried for Blakelock's murder, based on statements gathered during the Nove investigation, and acquitted. It transpired during Jacobs' trial that two of the witnesses who testified against him had been paid expenses to the tune of thousands of pounds during Nove's inquiry.

In parallel with the second investigation, a case was being prepared against Det Ch Supt Melvin and Det Insp Dingle. In July 1992 Melvin was charged with perjury and conspiracy to pervert the course of justice, and Dingle with conspiracy. In 1994 their lawyers applied for access to information from Nove's inquiry, on the grounds that it might help their clients; anything that implicated Silcott would support the detectives' contention that their interview notes were genuine and that Silcott had, in effect, confessed. The lawyers argued that the detectives should not be prosecuted until all related criminal proceedings had concluded. Nove fought the application because he had promised his witnesses confidentiality, but he agreed to give the lawyers access to relevant passages from seven witness statements that implicated Silcott. The witnesses themselves refused to testify, so the passages were read out to the jury during the detectives' trial. According to Rose, only one of the statements seriously implicated Silcott, alleging that he had acted "like a general, sending out his little troops", and that he had joined in the attack himself. The day before the detectives' trial began in 1994, the Crown Prosecution Service announced that the nine suspects would not be prosecuted because it was not in the public interest.

=== (1994) Trial: R v Melvin and Dingle ===
R v Melvin and Dingle
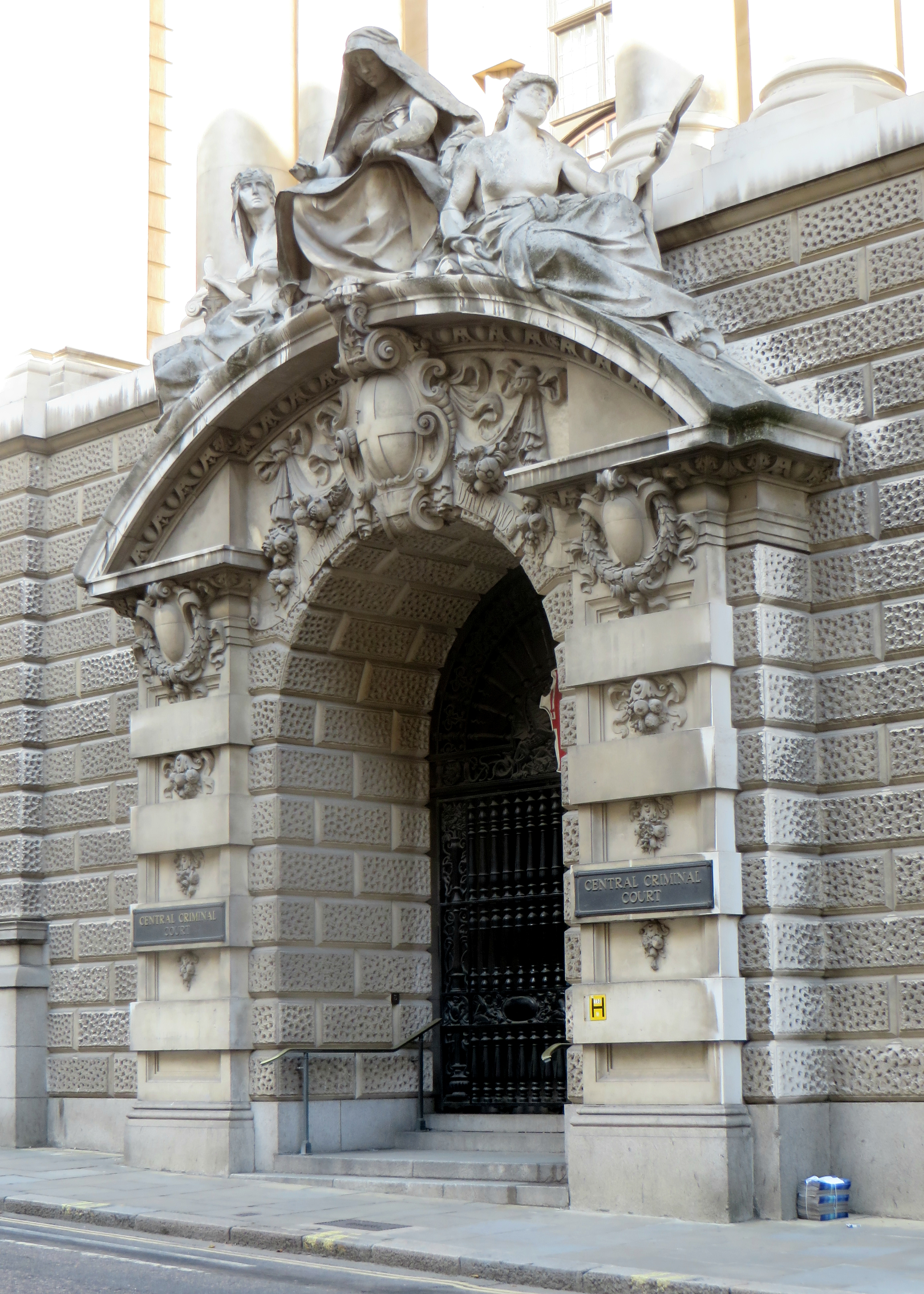
- Court: Central Criminal Court (Old Bailey)
- Decided: 26 July 1994

Court membership
- Judge sitting: Mr. Justice Jowitt

The trial of Det Ch Supt Melvin and Det Insp Dingle opened in June 1994 at the Old Bailey before Mr. Justice Jowitt. Only three people had been present during the disputed interview with Silcott—Melvin, Dingle and Silcott himself—and none of them gave evidence.

David Calvert-Smith, for the prosecution, alleged that the detectives' reportedly contemporaneous notes of the fifth interview with Silcott had been altered after the fact to include the self-incriminating remarks. Silcott had refused to answer questions during the first four interviews. During the fifth, when told there were witness statements that he had struck Blakelock with a machete or similar, the notes show him saying: "Those kids will never go to court. You wait and see. No one else will talk to you. You can't keep me away from them." Silcott denied ever having said those words.

Richard Ferguson QC, for the defence, argued that the ESDA test, which suggested that the disputed words had been added to the notes later, was not reliable. The defence also produced 14 witness statements from the two Blakelock inquiries, seven of them excerpts from Nove's 1992–1994 inquiry and seven from the original investigation in 1985; the latter were read out to the jury as statements H to N. One of the 1985 statements said that Silcott had been carrying a knife with a two-foot-long blade on the night of the murder and that he had attacked Blakelock.

Several of the statements H–N originated from the juveniles who had been arrested shortly after the murder. They included Jason Hill, the 13-year-old who had been held for three days in his underpants and a blanket, without access to his parents or a lawyer. (Hill received £30,000 in damages from the police over his treatment.) Hill had not been told that his statement was going to be read out in court during the detectives' trial; he first learned that it had been used when he heard it on television. Another statement was from Mark Pennant, also a juvenile who had been arrested during the first inquiry. Overall it appeared that Silcott was being retried.

The detectives were acquitted on 26 July 1994 by a unanimous verdict. Both had been suspended during the case. Dingle retired immediately. Melvin was greeted as a hero when he returned to work, but he retired three months later.

== Third investigation ==
=== (2003) Det Supt John Sweeney ===
In March 1999 the Metropolitan Police included Blakelock's killing in a review of 300 unsolved murders in London going back to 1984, when details were first recorded on computer. In December 2003, weeks after Silcott was released from jail after serving 17 years for the murder of Anthony Smith, police announced that the Blakelock investigation had been re-opened, and would be led by Det Supt John Sweeney.

Detectives began re-examining 10,000 witness statements and submitting items for forensic tests not available in 1985. In September 2004 the back garden of a terraced council house in Willan Road, near the Broadwater Farm estate, was excavated after a tip-off. A female friend of Cynthia Jarrett, the woman whose death sparked the Broadwater Farm riot, lived alone at the house between 1984 and 1989, and according to the Evening Standard was one of the first on the scene when police raided Jarrett's house. Archaeologists dug up the garden, while surveyors used infra-red beams to create a three-dimensional map of the area. A machete was found and sent for forensic tests. Police also searched the garden for Blakelock's truncheon and helmet. In October 2004 his overalls were retrieved from Scotland Yard's Crime Museum for DNA tests. Nothing was found that could be used as evidence.

=== (2010 and 2013) Ten arrests; Jacobs charged ===
- Nicholas Jacobs after his acquittal in April 2014

Overview
- Born: 30 October 1968
- Occupation in 1985: Unknown
- Criminal charge(s): Affray (convicted 1986), murder of Keith Blakelock (acquitted 2014)

Six years later, between February and October 2010, 10 men between the ages of 42 and 52 were arrested on suspicion of Blakelock's murder. (Note: Sean O'Neill (The Times, 2 June 2010): "On 5 February [2010], a 40-year-old man, originally from Tottenham, was arrested in Suffolk and released on bail after questioning. Two men, aged 46 and 52, who had lived in Tottenham in 1985 were arrested at separate North London addresses in May 2010.") The first to be arrested, in February, was Nicholas Jacobs, who had been questioned in 1985 in connection with Blakelock's death and had been convicted of affray. Jacobs was one of nine suspects that the Crown Prosecution Service had decided not to charge with Blakelock's murder at the conclusion of Commander Perry Nove's 1992–1994 inquiry. Nothing appeared to come of the arrests. In October 2010, to mark the 25th anniversary, the BBC's Crimewatch staged a reconstruction and appealed for information.

In July 2013 the Crown Prosecution Service announced that, although suspicions remained about six of those arrested, no action would be taken against five of them because of insufficient evidence. The remaining suspect, Nicholas "Nicky" Conrad Jacobs, 16 years old at the time of the riot, was charged with Blakelock's murder that month and was remanded in custody. He pleaded not guilty in November 2013.

Jacobs was living with his mother in Manor Road, Tottenham, at the time of the riot. He had spent time in a residential school in Reading in 1983–1984 as a result of a care order, and in 1985 he joined a Tottenham gang, the Park Lane Crew. He was named shortly after the riot by two of those arrested, and was arrested himself five days later "in connection with the murder of PC Blakelock", according to police records. The police had a photograph of him from the night carrying a petrol bomb, a basket of rocks, and a crate. He told them he had first arrived at the estate after midnight, two hours after Blakelock was killed; he said he had been at home during the attack. He was charged with affray, and in November 1986 Judge Neil Denison sentenced him to eight years, ruling that Jacobs had "played a leading part" in the riots and had thrown a petrol bomb. The longest sentence handed out for affray during the riot, according to Rose, was reduced on appeal to six years.

=== (2014) Trial: R v Jacobs ===
R v Jacobs
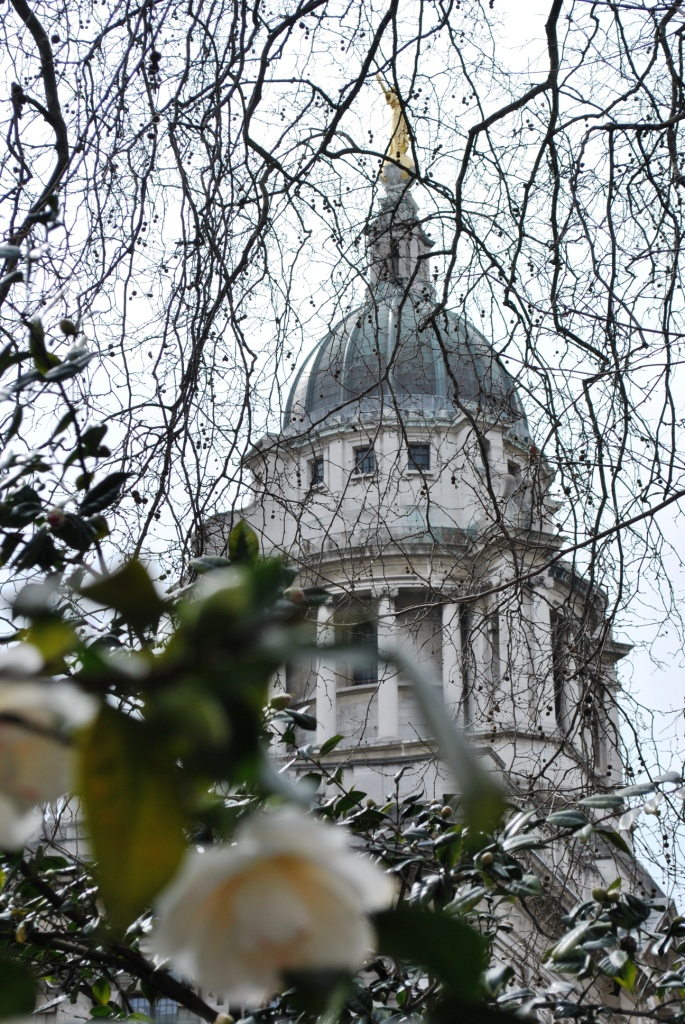
- Court: Central Criminal Court (Old Bailey)
- Decided: 9 April 2014

Court membership
- Judge sitting: Mr Justice Nicol

The trial of Nicholas Jacobs opened before Mr Justice Nicol at the Old Bailey on 3 March 2014. Jacobs did not take the stand. He was found not guilty on 9 April 2014 by a 10–2 verdict, reached after the jury was out for one day.

The court heard that, in 1988 while Jacobs was serving his sentence for affray, a guard had found rap lyrics in his cell, in Jacobs' handwriting:

Me have de chopper we have intention to kill an police officer PC Blakelock de unlucky fucker him dis an help de fireman. Who did an out an fire de fireman see we av come and decide to scatter but PC Blakelock him never smell the danger but when we fly down upon him he start scream and holla everybody gather round and av pure laughter he try to head out but we trip him over he start beg for mercy but it didn't matter him try to play super man and him ger capture him and have to face the consequences.

We chopper we start chop him on his hand we chop him on him finger we chop him on him leg we chop him on his shoulder him head him chest him neck we chop him all over when we done kill him off lord er feel much better ...me just wipe off me knife and go check on daughter we sit down and talk and she cook me dinner ..."

Courtenay Griffiths QC, defending, responded that Bob Marley had not been prosecuted for "I Shot the Sheriff". The court was also told that, when Jacobs was arrested for attempted burglary in May 2000, by then aged 30, he reportedly told an officer: "Fuck off, I was one of them who killed PC Blakelock," which the defence called a "flippant street remark".

==== Witnesses ====
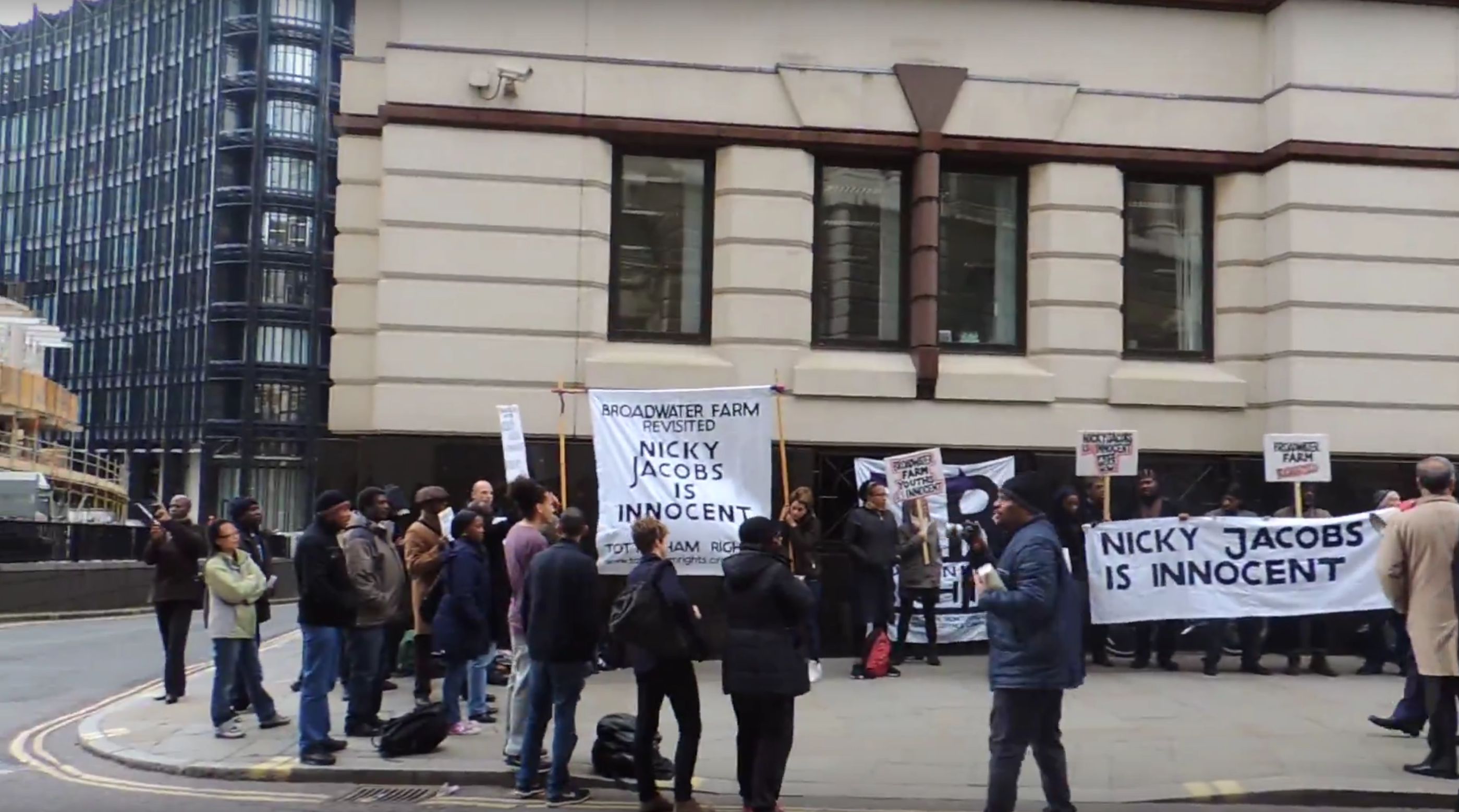
Broadwater Farm Defence Campaign protest during the trial of Nicky Jacobs, March 2014

The main prosecution witnesses were three pseudonymous men who testified from behind a curtain with their voices distorted. Two of them, "John Brown" and "Rhodes Levin", had offered testimony to Nove during his 1992–1994 investigation; the third, "Q", was Brown's cousin. Richard Whittam QC, for the prosecution, told the court that all three had admitted kicking or hitting Blakelock and would normally face murder charges themselves, but the CPS had decided during Commander Perry Nove's inquiry to offer the "kickers" immunity in exchange for testimony against the "stabbers".

"John Brown", aged 20 at the time of the attack, had served a sentence for affray for his role in the rioting. He was a member of the Park Lane Crew, a Tottenham gang that he said Jacobs had also joined. Approached by police again during Nove's second inquiry, Brown said in a statement in August 1993 that Jacobs was a "nutter" who was "out to get blood" that night. He said Jacobs had "broadcast it everywhere that he was going to try and do a copper", and that the Park Lane Crew had stored weapons and petrol bombs in preparation for such an attack. Brown admitted to having kicked Blakelock up to ten times and said that he had seen Jacobs attack Blakelock with a machete or similar. The police gave Brown £5,000 in 1993 and an additional £590 in January 2011 toward his rent; they also paid for credits for his mobile phone so that they could reach him, and paid to have his car put through a MOT test (an annual roadworthiness test). The court heard that Brown had also been "made aware" by police that The Sun had offered a £100,000 reward. He told the police in 1993 that he had difficulty identifying black people: "I can't tell the difference between them. To me a black man is a black man."

The second witness, "Rhodes Levin", had also served a sentence for affray for his role in the riots, and had a history of using cocaine, crack cocaine and heroin. He admitted to having kicked Blakelock several times. He said that Jacobs had been carrying a lock-knife with a brown handle and six-inch (15 cm) blade that night (Blakelock was found with a six-inch blade with a wooden handle embedded in his neck up to the hilt). Afterwards, Levin said, Jacobs told him he had "got a couple of jukes [stabs] in". Levin testified that Blakelock's helmet had been passed around as a trophy; he said he could not recall the names of those who had handled it. Levin was interviewed by police in November 1985, when he said Winston Silcott had led the attack with a machete; he told the court in 2014 that that had been a mistake. The court heard that, during Nove's 1992–1994 investigation, police had offered Levin immunity from prosecution, given him £5,000, and paid for a flight from Spain when he missed his flight home from a holiday. They approached him again in January 2008 for his testimony and helped him with expenses and a deposit for accommodation.

"Q", the third witness, first told police in 2009 that he had seen the attack, after they posted a note through his letterbox asking for witnesses. The court heard that Q had a long history of using drugs and alcohol. He said he had known Nicholas Jacobs all his life and had seen him attack Blakelock with a "mini sword" or similar, making "repeated stabbing motions" toward Blakelock. The defence lawyer told the court that Q was a fantasist. Q was unable to describe accurately where the attack had taken place.

== Awards and legacy ==
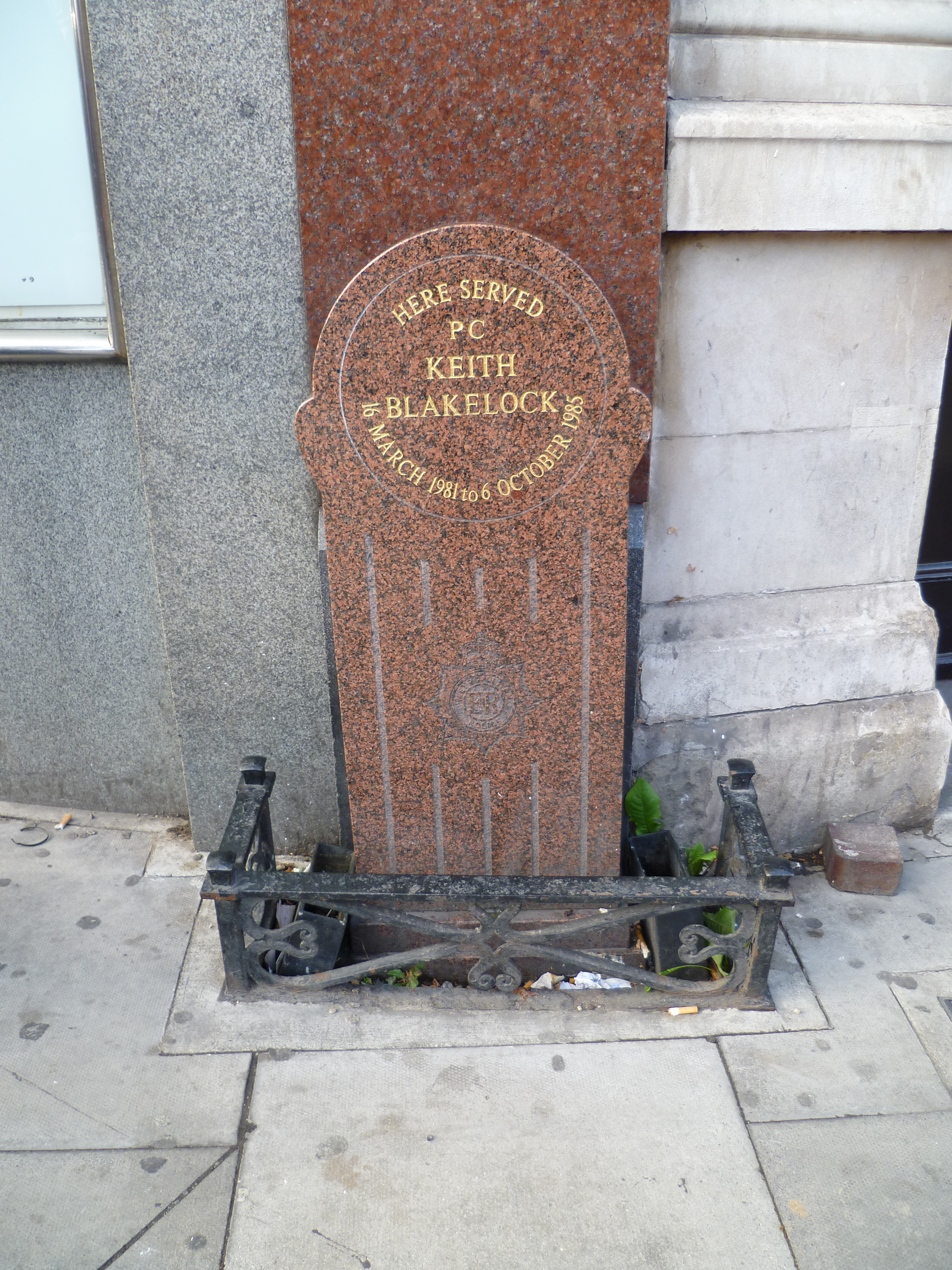
Blakelock Memorial, on a roundabout, Muswell Hill, London

Blakelock was buried in East Finchley Cemetery on 11 December 1985. For his funeral service at St. James's Church, Muswell Hill—conducted by the Rev Michael Bunker, the vicar of St. James's; the Rt Rev Brian Masters, Bishop of Edmonton; and Archdeacon Robert Coogan—the church's seating capacity had to be extended from 600 to 800, and a further 300 police officers in a nearby British Legion hall joined in by closed-circuit television. A public-address system was installed to allow 500 people standing outside the church to hear the service. The Guardian described it as a "miniature state occasion". A memorial for Blakelock, commissioned by the Police Memorial Trust, stands by the roundabout at Muswell Hill, north London, where he was a homebeat officer.

PC Dick Coombes, badly injured during the attack, went back to work part-time in July 1986 but was forced to retire in 1991, partly because of the epilepsy that developed as a result of brain damage. His eyesight deteriorated and he was left barely able to stand. In January 1988 every member of Serial 502 was awarded a High Commendation by Sir Peter Imbert, then Commissioner of the Metropolitan Police. In August that year, all the constables, including Blakelock, were awarded the Queen's Gallantry Medal for "outstanding bravery and devotion to duty"; Blakelock's wife attended the ceremony on his behalf. Sgt David Pengelly, who single-handedly fought to hold the crowd away from Blakelock and Richard Coombes after they fell, received the George Medal, awarded for acts of great bravery, for having proceeded "with total disregard for his own safety". Trevor Stratford of the London Fire Brigade was also awarded the Queen's Gallantry Medal; he and another firefighter, Graham Holloway, received commendations from the fire brigade for outstanding bravery. Two firefighters, James Ryan and David Kwai, received the Chief Fire Officer's letter of congratulations.

External images
- Keith Blakelock, in civilian clothes, The Guardian
- "Back to the future". The Independent cartoon comparing the 2011 England riots to the 1985 Broadwater Farm Riot.

A lack of clarity about who was in charge of the police operation on the night of Blakelock's death led to a failure to deploy reinforcements and equipment in a timely manner. To ensure that such a situation was never repeated, a new "gold–silver–bronze command structure" (strategic–tactical–operational) was created in 1985 that replaced ranks with roles. It is used by all British emergency services at every type of major incident.

Comparisons were made to the 1985 Broadwater Farm Riot when rioting broke out again in Tottenham in August 2011. After police shot and killed a man, Mark Duggan, believing that he was armed, around 120 people marched from Broadwater Farm to the local police station, echoing the protests that preceded the rioting on 6 October 1985. Violence and looting spread throughout England for several days, leading to five deaths, extensive property damage and over 3,000 arrests.

== See also ==
- List of British police officers killed in the line of duty
- List of recipients of the George Medal
- Police and Criminal Evidence Act 1984 – Act of the Parliament of the United Kingdom
- Royal Commission on Criminal Justice (1991–1993)
- Scarman Report – Report commissioned by the UK Government following the 1981 Brixton riots

== Sources ==
=== Works cited ===
(News sources and websites are listed in the References section only.)

- "RIBA blames council for riot 'ghetto'" (PDF). Architects' Journal. 16 October 1985. Archived (PDF) from the original on 18 May 2018.
- "Not working on Maggie's farm (editorial)" (PDF). Architects' Journal. 16 October 1985. Archived (PDF) from the original on 19 May 2018.
- Brain, Timothy (2010). "Handsworth, Brixton, and Broadwater Farm". A History of Policing in England and Wales from 1974: A Turbulent Journey. New York: Oxford University Press. ISBN 9780199218660.
- Burnham, Margaret (1987). The Burnham Report of International Jurists in Respect to Broadwater Farm Trials. London: Broadwater Farm Defence Campaign.
- Cashmore, Ellis; McLaughlin, Eugene (2013) [1991]. "Introduction". In Cashmore, Ellis; McLaughlin, Eugene (eds.). Out of order? Policing Black People. Abingdon and New York: Routledge.
- Cashmore, Ellis; McLaughlin, Eugene (2013) [1991]. "Out of order?". In Cashmore, Ellis; McLaughlin, Eugene (eds.). Out of order? Policing Black People. Abingdon and New York: Routledge.
- Fennell, Philip W. H. (March 1994). "Mentally Disordered Suspects in the Criminal Justice System". Journal of Law and Society. 21 (1): 57–71. doi:10.2307/1410270. JSTOR 1410270.
- Fiennes, Ranulph (2011). My Heroes: Extraordinary Courage, Exceptional People. London: Hodder & Stoughton Ltd.
- Gifford, Anthony (1986). The Broadwater Farm Inquiry: Report of the Independent Inquiry into Disturbances of October 1985 at the Broadwater Farm Estate, Tottenham. London: Karia Press.
- Eldon Griffiths, MP for Bury St. Edmunds (23 October 1985). "Urban Disturbances". Parliamentary Debates (Hansard). House of Commons. col. 348–388.
- Guðjónsson, Gísli (2003). The Psychology of Interrogations and Confessions: A Handbook. London: John Wiley and Sons.
- Henry, Alistair (2017). Transformations of Policing. London: Routledge.
- Jacobs, Brian (2009). Black Politics and Urban Crisis in Britain. Cambridge: Cambridge University Press.
- Jones, Cecily (2007). "Broadwater Farm estate: pre-riot problems". In Dabydeen, David; Gilmore, John; Jones, Cecily (eds.). The Oxford Companion to Black British History. Oxford University Press.
- Joyce, Peter (2017). The Policing of Protest, Disorder and International Terrorism in the UK since 1945. Springer. ISBN 9781137290595.
- Moore, Tony (2015). The Killing of Constable Keith Blakelock: The Broadwater Farm Riot. London: Waterside Press.
- Newman, Kenneth (July 1986). "Police-Public Relations: The Pace of Change" (PDF). Police Foundation Annual Lecture. Archived from the original (PDF) on 21 July 2011.
- Ravenscroft, Tom (11 August 2011). "From the AJ archive: Broadwater Farm riots, London, 1985". Architects' Journal. Archived from the original on 5 July 2018.
- Rix, Keith J. B. (January 1997). "Fit to be interviewed by the police?". Advances in Psychiatric Treatment. 3 (1): 33–40. doi:10.1192/apt.3.1.33.
- Rose, David (1992). Climate of Fear: The Murder of PC Blakelock and the Case of the Tottenham Three. London: Bloomsbury.
- Rose, David (1996). In the Name of the Law. London: Jonathan Cape.
- Tompson, Keith (1988). Under Siege: Racism and Violence in Britain Today. London: Penguin Books. ISBN 9780140523911. "Keith Tompson is a pen name for Silicon Valley entrepreneur Keith Teare. He was active in anti-racist campaigns in the UK between 1979 and 1996. This book was written at a time when extreme right-wing groups were targeting activists, hence the use of a pen name to protect his identity."
- Vanstiphout, Wouter (April 2011). "Blame the Architect (lecture 3, part 1 of 6)". Design as Politics, Delft University of Technology.
- Walker, Clive (1999). "Miscarriages of Justice in Principle and Practice". In Walker, Clive; Starmer, Keir (eds.). Miscarriages of Justice: A Review of Justice in Error. Oxford University Press.
- Whitehead, Jack; Robinson, Keith (23 October 2011). "The Slum Clearance Movement in the Nineteen Thirties". locallocalhistory.co.uk. Archived from the original on 16 November 2018.
- Williams, David A. (1986). Internal Police Report on the disorders of the 6th October 1985 at the Broadwater Farm Estate, Tottenham. London: Metropolitan Police.
