= Police helmet =

Police Helmet may mean the following:

- Custodian helmet as worn by British and other police forces
- Crash helmets
- Helmet camera
- Riot protection helmet
