= Tottenham riots =

Tottenham riots may refer to:

- Broadwater Farm riot of 1985
- The 2011 England riots which began in Tottenham
