= John Sweeney (police officer) =

John Sweeney is a Detective Superintendent in the Metropolitan Police Service. As of 2011, he was leading Operation Withern, the investigation into the 2011 London riots.

He had previously led the reinvestigation of the murder of policeman Keith Blakelock.
