= Derek Hodgson (judge) =

British judge (1917–2002)

Sir Walter Derek Thornley Hodgson (24 May 1917 – 10 October 2002) was a British barrister and High Court judge. He presided over the Blakelock trial in 1987.

Hodgson was born in Manchester and studied at Trinity Hall, Cambridge. He was involved in law reform and on a committee working with the Howard League for Penal Reform. He was vice chair of the Parole Board (England and Wales) in 1982-83.
