= Kurt Barling =

British professor of journalism (born 1961)

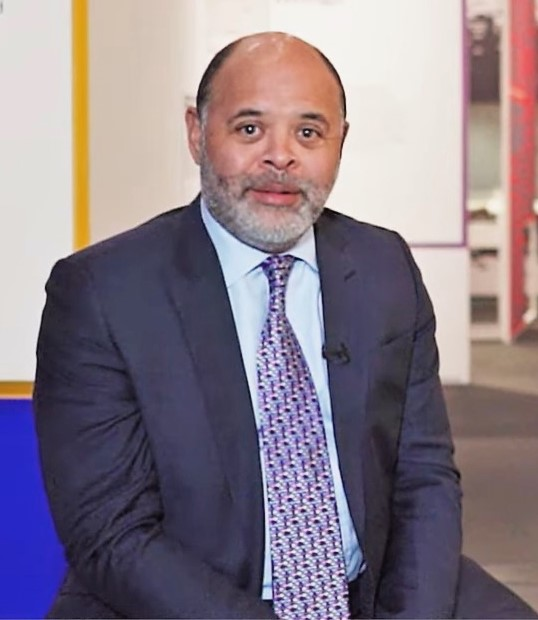
- Barling introduces a journalism exhibit at the British Library in 2022
- Born: 1961 (age 64–65); London, England
- Education: City of London Polytechnic; London School of Economics; Paris Institute of Political Studies
- Occupations: Journalist and academic

J. Kurt Barling (born November 1961) is a British professor of journalism at Middlesex University. He previously worked as a journalist for the BBC for 25 years and before that as a lecturer at the London School of Economics. In 1997, he won the CRE's Reporter of the Year award. He is also an author and has been an independent film producer.

== Biography ==
Kurt Barling was born in 1961, of mixed Anglo-Irish and African heritage, in north London, where he attended comprehensive school. He gained a BA (Hons) First-Class degree in Politics & Modern Languages from City of London Polytechnic, before winning scholarships to do postgraduate work at the London School of Economics and the Paris Institute of Political Studies (Sciences Po Paris), earning an MSc in Government and a PhD in International Relations, and going on to lecture in LSE's International Relations Department.

Barling was motivated to become a journalist after observing the 1985 Broadwater Farm riots at first hand. In 1989, he joined the BBC, where over the following 25 years he worked on a wide range of prestigious news and current affairs programmes, on both television and radio, including Newsnight, Today, The Money Programme and Black Britain. He covered many stories internationally and has made dozens of documentaries. From 1997 to 2000, he was a BBC News Correspondent, left briefly in 2000 before returning year as a freelancer with BBC London, and from 2001 to 2014 was the Special Correspondent for BBC London News, writing a weekly online column for seven years known latterly as the blog "Barling's London". Barling was one of the BBC's longest-serving ethnic minority journalists. He has also worked as an independent film producer.

Among numerous awards Barling has received for his journalism, film-making and writing, in 1997 he won the Commission for Racial Equality (CRE) "Reporter of the Year" award, as well as several other industry awards.

Since 2012 he has been teaching and researching in the School of Media and Performing Arts at Middlesex University, becoming Professor of Journalism in November 2013.

In 2016 Barling edited and wrote an introduction to the book Finsternis in Deutschland, a translation of E. Amy Buller's Darkness over Germany, originally published in English in 1943 during World War II. A copy of the book was presented to the Queen, who had met Buller in 1944 after the book's first publication.

== Awards ==
- 1995: Winner, Bradford & Bingley Personal Finance Awards (Money Check, BBC Radio 5 Live).
- 1996: Winner, Golden Pen Personal Finance Awards, (Money Box, BBC Radio 4).
- 1997: Winner, CRE, RIMA (Race in the Media Award), TV Reporter of the Year (BBC News).
- 1998: Winner, CRE, RIMA, TV Reporter of the Year (Black Britain). Commended, Radio Reporter of the Year (BBC News).
- 2001: Nominations for Sports Documentary of the Year: Royal Television Society RTS), EMMAs.
- 2002: Reporter of the Year Nominations: Royal Television Society (London), EMMAs.
- 2003: Winner, CRE, RIMA, TV Reporter of the Year (BBC London News).
- 2004: Nomination Reporter of the Year, Royal Television Society (London).
- 2005: Winner, CRE, RIMA, Best Film Documentary. Nomination, CRE, RIMA TV Reporter of the Year.
- 2006: Winner, RIMA, Television News. Finalist, One World Media Awards. Shortlisted, RTS London, Reporter of the Year.

== Selected publications ==
- Barling, Kurt, & Reda Hassaine (2014), Abu Hamza Guilty: The fight against radical Islam, London: Redshank Books. ISBN 9780993000201
- Barling, Kurt (2015), The R word: Racism. Provocations. London: Biteback Publishing. ISBN 9781849549424
- Barling, K. (ed. and introduction), Buller, E. A., Finsternis in Deutschland (trans. from Darkness over Germany, 1934), Munchen: Sandmann Verlag, 2016
