= Amy Buller =

British educator and writer (1891–1974)

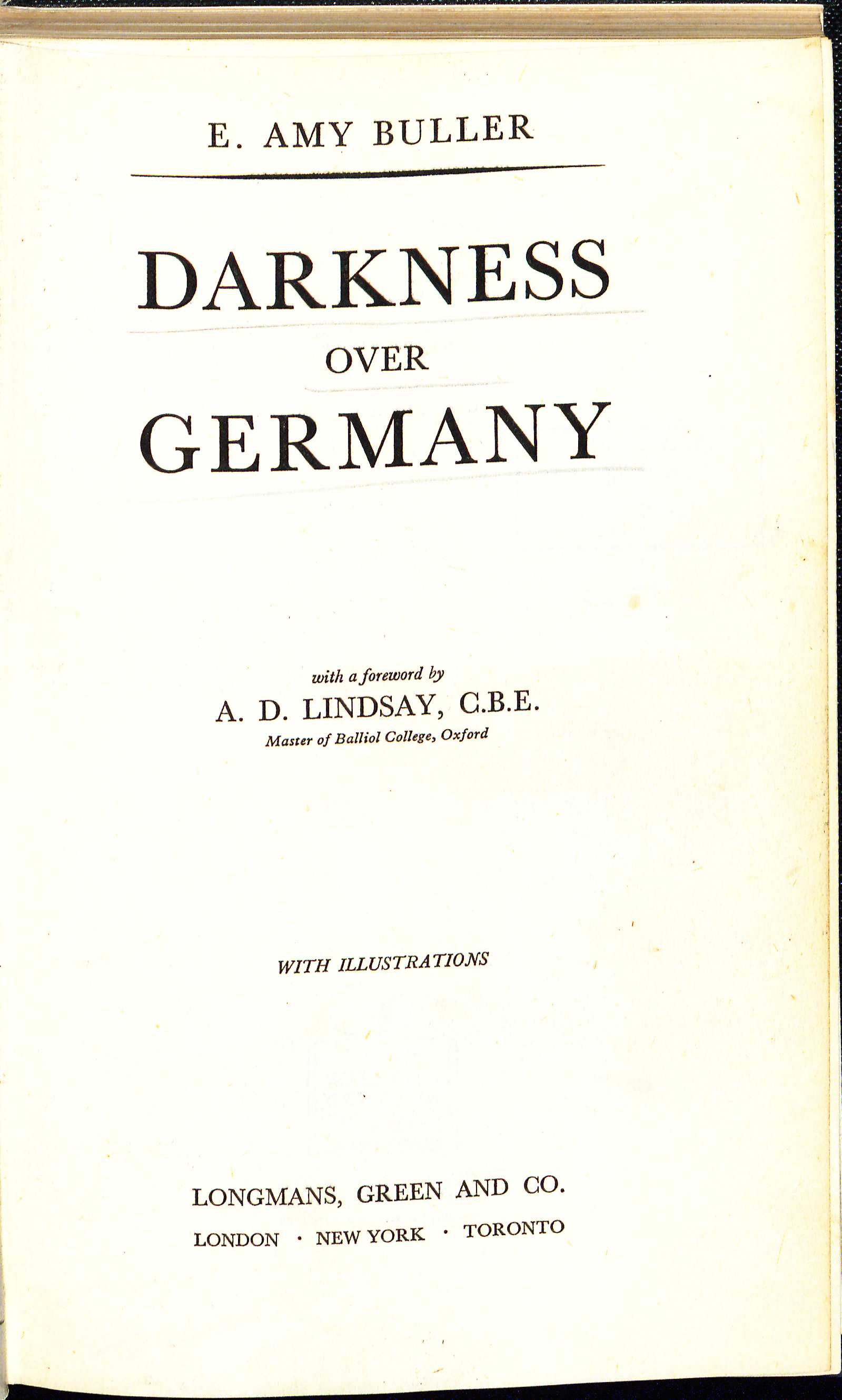
- Cover of the book Darkness over Germany (1943)
- Born: Amy Buller; November 9, 1891; London, U.K.
- Died: 1974 (aged 82–83); London, U.K.
- Education: Birkbeck College
- Known for: Darkness over Germany (1943)

Amy Buller MBE (born 9 November 1891, London; died 1974, London) was a British educator and author, known for her book, Darkness over Germany (1943). She wrote about how Nazi policies ideologically manipulated young Germans.

== Early life ==
Amy Buller grew up in a Baptist family in South Africa. In 1911, she returned to England but visited Germany several times before the outbreak of the First World War. She studied German at Birkbeck College, receiving her degree in 1917.

She converted to Anglo-Catholicism and, after graduating, from 1921 worked as an employee for the Student Christian Movement of Great Britain (SCM), first in Manchester and from 1922 in London. Between 1929 and 1931 she was a member of the SCM executive committee.

== Darkness over Germany (1943) ==
She visited Germany regularly and organised visits by English clergy and teachers even after the rise of the National Socialist party. She saw the enthusiasm for National Socialism as being a sort of replacement religion. Her groups travelled widely around Germany in the pre-war years, visiting, for example, a labour camp. The London Ambassador Joachim von Ribbentrop had hoped to harness the British groups of visitors for propaganda purposes but in 1937 found this was not possible and obstructed further visits.

In the introduction to her book Darkness over Germany, Buller wrote: "I record these stories to emphasize the need for youth and those who plan the training of youth to consider carefully the full significance of the tragedy of a whole generation of German youth who, having no faith, made Nazism their religion."

A new edition of the book, featuring a foreword by Kurt Barling was published in 2017.

== After the war ==
Buller planned to found a college that taught from a Christian perspective. She planned to set this up in the Catherine Foundation buildings in Regent's Park but this fell through. Eventually she was given the use of Cumberland Lodge in Windsor Park. In 1947, the foundation called "The Foundation of St. Catherine" was created. She held the office of Warden until 1966. Her book was placed on the reading list of Queen Elizabeth during the war and after reading it was so impressed she invited Amy to visit her and it was the Queen who secured Cumberland Lodge for her Girls college part of the royal estates.
