= Crimson Architectural Historians =

Architecture group based in Rotterdam

Crimson Historians & Urbanists (formerly known as Crimson Architectural Historians) is a group of architectural historians and urbanists based in Rotterdam, The Netherlands. The collective was formed in 1994 when Crimson became part of the planning team for the extension of Utrecht Leidse Rijn. In the following years, the office has developed a hybrid practice that takes the contemporary city as its object. Crimson designs for the city, researches it, writes texts and books about it, shows it in exhibitions and works of art, teaches about it, gives advice on it and makes policies for it.

Crimson came to international attention with the WiMBY! (Welcome into My BackYard!) urban renewal project, which begun in 2001 in the Rotterdam new town of Hoogvliet. The results of this project were published as The Big WiMBY! Book in 2007. The book was shortlisted for the RIBA 2008 International Book Award. Crimson was awarded the Jonge Rotterdam-Maaskant prize for architects in 2002. Villa The Heerlijkheid, which is part of WiMBY!, was selected for the shortlist of the 2008 World Architecture Festival in Barcelona, Spain, out of a longlist of 722 entries from 63 countries worldwide.

In 2014, Crimson, FAT Architecture and Owen Hatherley were selected to curate the British Pavilion at the 2014 Venice Biennale. The team responded to Rem Koolhaas’ theme “Absorbing Modernity: 1914–2014” with a project titled “A Clockwork Jerusalem.”

Crimson Historians & Urbanists is Ewout Dorman, Mike Emmerik, Annuska Pronkhorst, Michelle Provoost, Simone Rots, Wouter Vanstiphout and Cassandra Wilkins.

Members of Crimson have lectured at the TU Delft, at Groningen University, at the Danish Architecture Centre, at Technische Universität Berlin, among other places. In 2019, Crimson founded the Independent School for the City, together with Zones Urbaines Sensibles

== Select list of writings ==
- Michelle Provoost & Felix Rottenberg (Eds.), The Big WiMBY! Book (Rotterdam: NAi Publishers, 2007)
- Wouter Vanstiphout (Ed.), Too Blessed To Be Depressed: Crimson Architectural Historians 1994–2002 (Rotterdam: 010 Publishers, 2002)
- Crimson Historians & Urbanists (Ed.), A City of Comings and Goings (Rotterdam: nai010 Publishers, 2019)
