= Symbolic location =

A symbolic location is an expression coined by Sir Kenneth Newman, when he was Commissioner of the London Metropolitan Police Service (the Met) from 1982 to 1987. The term was used by the police in London in the 1980s to refer to a no-go area, one regarded by local youths as their territory, where police were viewed as intruders. John Smith, former deputy commissioner of the Met, said in 1991 that the term was no longer in use.

Symbolic locations were identified with high unemployment, a high crime rate, drug dealing, and illegal drinking and gambling. Newman said in 1983 that they "equated closely with the criminal rookeries of Dickensian London," and symbolized the inability of the police to maintain law and order. In a report that year to the Home Secretary, he offered as examples Broadwater Farm in Tottenham, Railton Road in Brixton, and All Saints Road in Notting Hill. Stonebridge Estate in Harlesden was cited as another example, as was the Notting Hill Carnival.

P.A.J. Waddington wrote in 1999 that the police sought on occasion to restore—"take back"—symbolic locations as public spaces, leading to raids under a pretext of breaking up criminality. The term was criticized for identifying largely black communities in England with crime, or as a social problem. John Solomos and Les Black argued in 1996 that such thinking was an example of "profound historical amnesia," because, they wrote, Britain has a long history of civil unrest.
