= Riot protection helmet =

Protective gear for law enforcement and military

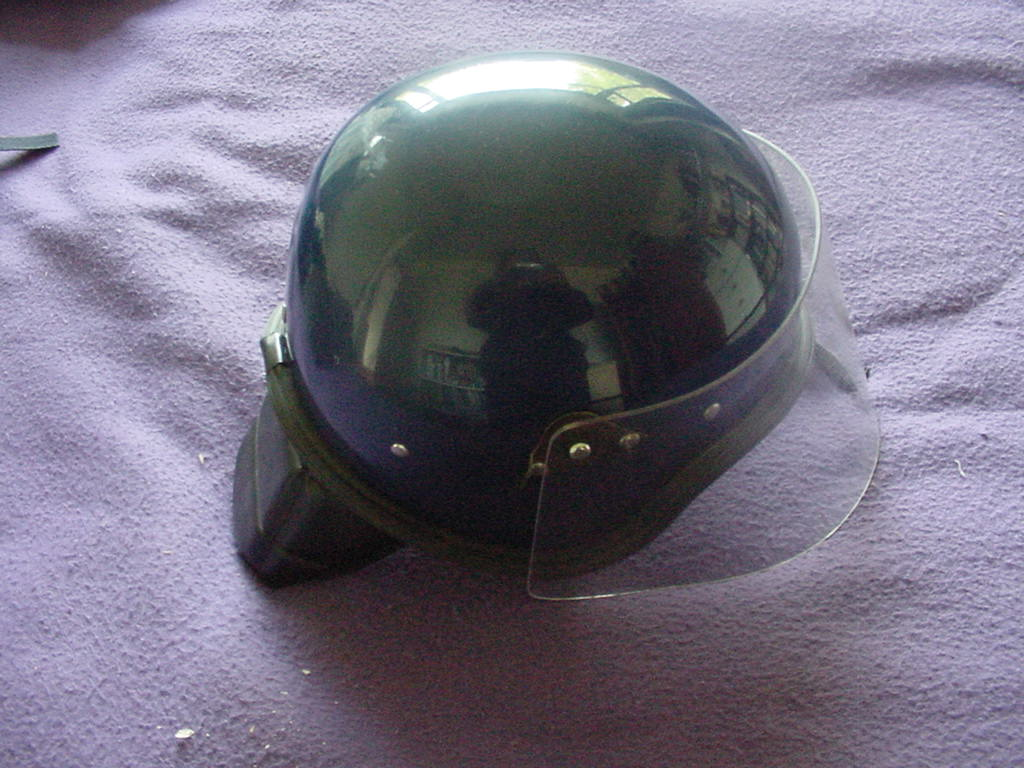
A riot protection helmet with rear neck protection

A riot protection helmet or riot helmet is a type of helmet designed for law enforcement and military use to protect the wearer's head, face and eyes from handheld melee weapons, and thrown projectiles such as bricks, as may be met in riot control. Many modern riot squad helmets are reinforced with materials that will protect the wearer from dangerous substances such as acids or industrial chemicals. The riot protection helmets are usually made to be able to easily fit a gas mask, especially when tear gas is being used.

There have been rare cases of riot protection helmets being worn to protect against objects blown by tornadoes or fierce storms, for example in England in the 18 January 2007 gale.

== Description ==
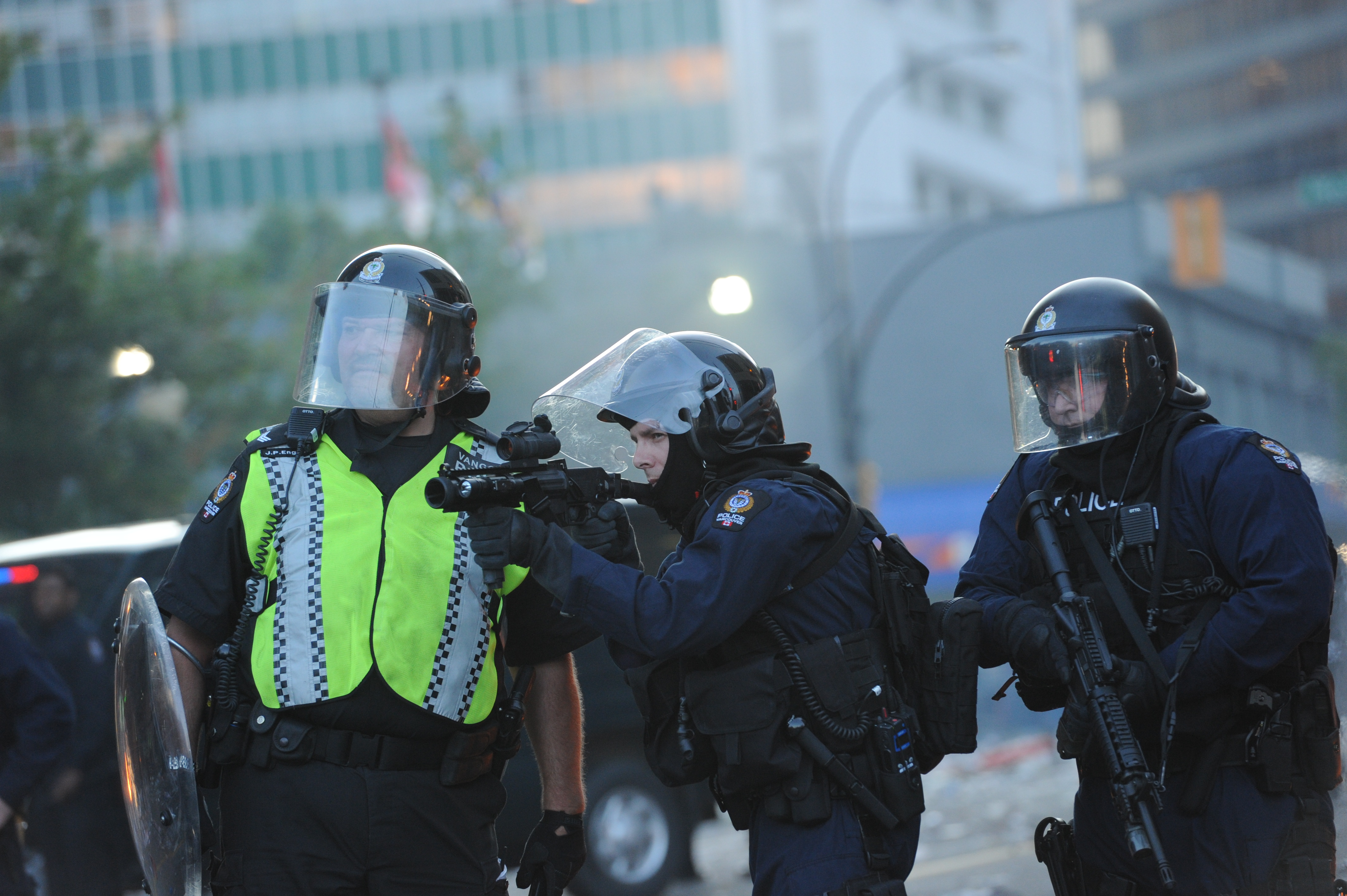
Vancouver Police Department officers wearing riot gear, including riot helmets, during the 2011 Vancouver Stanley Cup riot

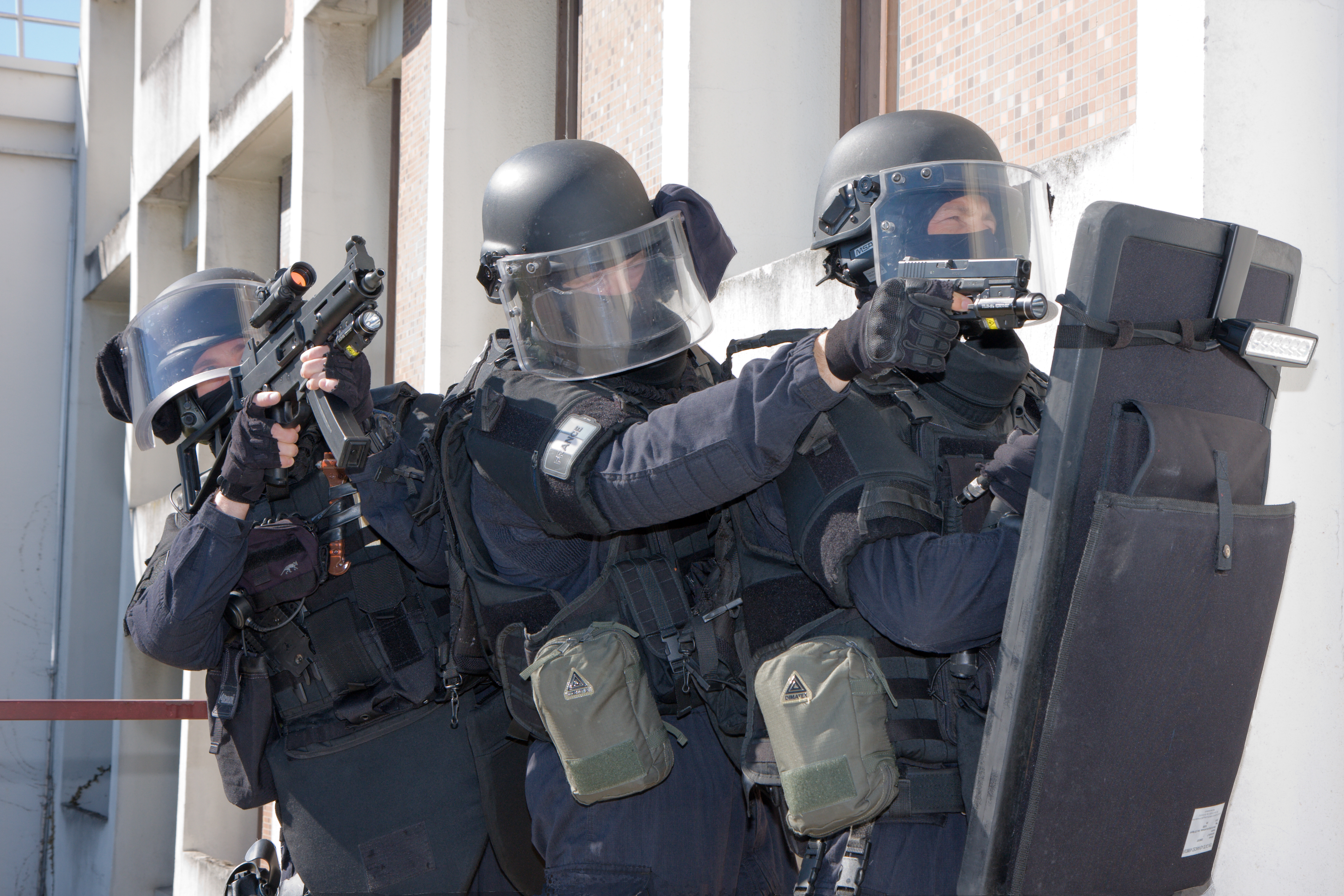
GIGN operatives wearing riot helmets in a training exercise

The simplest form is a hard shell with reinforced padding, and a chinstrap and a hinge-up (usually polycarbonate) visor, as in this image. These riot protection helmet visors are usually curved sideways and straight up-and-down, not curved both ways like on the older type of motorcycle helmet. One accessory is a back-of-the-neck protector.

An example of a more complicated riot squad helmet is a French CRS helmet which has two visors: the outer visor is clear and hinges up outside the helmet; the inner visor hinges up between two layers of the helmet and has a finish which can be seen through from inside but from outside looks like opaque polished brass.

Accessories can include built-in radio microphone and earpieces.

British cash-in-transit officers can also be seen wearing these helmets along with a stab proof vest to prevent serious injury if under attack.
