= 1985 Brixton riot =

Riot in London

1985 Brixton riot and Shooting of Cherry Groce
- Date: 28–30 September 1985
- Location: Borough of Lambeth, South London
- Caused by: Police raid and shooting of Cherry Groce

Parties
Rioters	Metropolitan Police

Lead figures
Cherry Groce; Michael Groce	DAC Richard Wells

Casualties and losses
43 injured	10 injured

Casualties
- Death: Photo-journalist David Hodge
- Injuries: 53
- Arrested: 200

The Brixton riot of 1985 started on 28 September in Lambeth in South London. It was the second major riot that the area had witnessed in the space of four years, after the 1981 Brixton riot. It was sparked by the shooting of Dorothy "Cherry" Groce by the Metropolitan Police, while they sought her 21-year-old son Michael Groce in relation to a robbery and suspected firearms offence; they believed Michael was hiding in his mother's home.

During the two days of riots, photojournalist David Hodge was killed, and 43 civilians and 10 police officers were hurt. Amongst a number of fires, one building was destroyed, 55 cars were burnt out, and 58 burglaries were committed including acts of looting.

Cherry Groce died in 2011. In March 2014, the police apologised for wrongfully shooting her. In July of the same year, an inquest jury concluded that eight separate police failures had contributed to her death, for which the then Commissioner of the Metropolitan Police Sir Bernard Hogan-Howe "apologised unreservedly for our failings" to the family.

== Background ==
Some of the community of Lambeth, after the 1981 Brixton riot, did not trust the Metropolitan Police, with many people, especially from African-Caribbean population, upset about the alleged institutional racism of the police force.

Twenty-one-year-old Michael Groce was one of six children born to Dorothy "Cherry" Groce, who had migrated to the area from Jamaica when she was in her early teens. From age six much of his life was spent in residential care, brought up in Tinworth House, on a rough housing estate in Vauxhall. Michael was involved with street gangs, and had been exposed to guns during his childhood. He spent time in and out of prison throughout his life, and by 1985 had accrued 50 convictions and 15 different spells in prison.

After being released from prison two months before, whilst out on licence Michael was caught up in a turf war between local street gangs. Subsequently, given a gun for protection by a friend, a few days before the riots Michael was in an argument with his girlfriend at his mother's house; in a fit of anger, he fired the gun into a wardrobe. Later, he heard a knock on the door. When he answered it, a police officer asked if he was Michael Groce. He tried to close the door. When the police officer would not let him, Michael put the gun into the officer's mouth. After the officer left, Michael cleaned and stored the gun, then fled to his sister's home.

== Raid on Cherry Groce's house ==
On the morning of Saturday 28 September 1985, a group of police officers raided Cherry Groce's house on Normandy Road, Brixton, including an armed CID officer, searching for suspected armed robber Michael Groce. Cherry was in bed, whilst three of her six children were in residence when the police entered the house with force. During the raid, Cherry was shot and seriously injured; after an extensive search, the police did not find Michael Groce. An ambulance was called, and by the time it had arrived a small crowd had gathered outside the house. Cherry Groce was taken to St Thomas' Hospital in central London.

== Riots ==
As word of the shooting spread throughout the community, rumours persisted that Cherry Groce had been killed in the raid. The group that had gathered outside her house grew to over 60, and then moved to the local district police station, where they began chanting "murderers" and anti-police slogans, demanding disciplinary action against the officers involved.

However, hostility between the largely black crowd and the largely white police force quickly escalated into a series of mild street battles. These then developed into elongated skirmishes in the areas of Brixton Road and Acre Lane, where the first two of a total of 55 cars over the following 48 hours were burnt out. In response the police deployed the first 50 officers in riot gear in the afternoon, who approached rioters whilst banging their truncheons on their riot shields. Through force which involved a number of reported unprovoked attacks on local passers-by and accredited members of the media, the police cordoned off the area around the police station on Brixton Road, and then cleared the surrounding shopping district.

That evening, the police lost control of the area for approximately 48 hours. In the subsequent riot, severe injuries were sustained by both sides, with police injured as they were attacked by young black and white youths equipped with bricks and wooden stakes. After further skirmishes, the rioters built a defensive wall out of upturned cars across the Brixton Road, which were set alight at various times. From behind this wall, the rioters threw petrol bombs at the police, and looted local shops. As darkness fell on Coldharbour Lane, groups of men gathered and were stopping cars, opening doors and seizing the keys, expelling their occupants and then setting the cars on fire. One furniture shop, spanning the junction of Gresham Road, Barrington Road and Coldharbour Lane, was set on fire. The fire rapidly spread to the residential flats on the higher levels of the 4-storey building, and it was only by singular good fortune and heroic action of residents in rescuing one elderly gentleman that all escaped without loss of life or serious injury. Police later stated that they made 149 arrests that evening, mostly for violence, 20 for burglary and theft and two for petrol bombing.

In the aftermath, photo-journalist David Hodge died a few days later as a result of an aneurysm, after being attacked by gang of looters he was trying to photograph. In total over 50 people were injured, 200 arrests were made, one building and dozens of cars were destroyed, and several shops had been looted.

In a press conference on 30 September, Deputy Assistant Commissioner Richard Wells described the shooting of Cherry Groce as tragic, and whilst recognising the resultant "genuine feelings, particularly those of the relatives and friends of Mrs Groce", blamed the riots on "an unruly criminal element."

=== Subsequent riots: Peckham, Toxteth and Tottenham ===
On 30 September in Peckham, south London, black youths began throwing petrol bombs and setting shops alight. A major fire at a carpet warehouse off Peckham High Street was reported.

On 1 October 1985, 10 people (including three police officers) were injured in a second riot in Toxteth on 1 October 1985, after crowds stormed the district's streets and stoned and burnt cars in response to the arrest of four local black men in connection with a stabbing. Merseyside Police Operational Support Division was deployed into the area to restore order and were later criticised by community leaders and the Roman Catholic Archbishop of Liverpool, Derek Worlock, for their "over zealous and provocative tactics", which included the drumming of batons on riot shields.

One week later, another serious conflict, sparked by similar circumstances, broke out between the Metropolitan Police and mainly black residents of North London's Tottenham district in what became known as the Broadwater Farm riot.

== Aftermath ==
=== Cherry Groce ===
On her arrival at hospital, surgeons found that the bullet had penetrated Groce's lung and exited through her spine, paralysing her from the waist downwards. She was hospitalised for over a year, and in hospital-based rehabilitation for a further year; friends within the local community looked after her children. With Groce permanently paralysed and only able to get around in a wheelchair, and after further rehabilitation, she and her family were allocated a new bungalow in which to live.

The police officer who shot Groce, Detective Inspector Douglas Lovelock, was prosecuted but eventually acquitted of malicious wounding. Groce later received over £500,000 in compensation from the Metropolitan Police, but with no admission of liability.

In 2011, Groce contracted an infection which led to kidney failure. She was treated at King's College Hospital, but she died on Easter Sunday, and was buried in May 2011.

In 2012 a blue plaque was installed at Cherry Groce's former home at 22 Normandy Road.

The Cherry Groce Memorial Pavilion was erected in Brixton's Windrush Square in 2021. It was designed by David Adjaye of Adjaye Associates. Groce's son, Lee Lawrence, described the memorial as "... a fitting tribute to my mother and to our community. The injustice done to my mother on 28 September, 1985 and its aftermath, catalysed our community to act together relentlessly and persistently in the pursuit of justice for more than three decades. Our achievements together in that effort can inspire us to continue to work together to make justice a reality across our society".

==== Inquest ====
After the death of Cherry Groce, the district coroner announced that a judicial inquest was to be held into her death, scheduled for June 2014. Simon Israel, reporting for Channel 4 News, revealed on 21 March 2014 that separate pathologists working on behalf of both the family and the police, both independently concluded that there was a causal link between the shooting and Groce's death.

With both the Metropolitan Police and former Inspector Douglas Lovelock both to be represented at the inquest by Queen's Counsel, the Legal Aid Agency refused the Groce family funds on the grounds that "there are no new issues." The family subsequently started a petition, and appealed directly to Prime Minister David Cameron for Legal Aid to support them at the inquest, supported by the Labour MP for Streatham, Chuka Umunna. The decision was subsequently overturned on 11 April 2014 by a ministerial discussion through the Ministry of Justice.

On 10 July 2014, the jury at Southwark Coroner's Court returned a verdict that concluded that eight separate police failures had contributed to Groce's death, and that her "subsequent death was contributed to by failures in the planning and implementation of the raid". Pathologist Dr Robert Chapman testified that during his post-mortem examination he had found metal fragments from the bullet still lodged in the base of her spine, which had contributed to her being more susceptible to debilitating illnesses. The Commissioner of the Metropolitan Police Sir Bernard Hogan-Howe subsequently "apologised unreservedly for our failings" to the family for the years of suffering, stating that the Metropolitan Police operation had been inadequate, failed to carry out its responsibilities properly, and that it was "inexcusable" that it had taken so long for the police to acknowledge these failings.

=== Michael Groce ===
After three days of hiding, Michael learnt via the television news about the shooting of his mother and the riots. He quietly turned himself in to the police the following day, accompanied by solicitor Paul Boateng. Michael was then interviewed at Scotland Yard in relation to an armed robbery at a jeweller's shop in Royston, Hertfordshire on 10 September, and later released on police bail. On 26 September, he was charged at Waterloo police station with illegal possession of a sawn-off shotgun, for which he subsequently received a three-year suspended sentence. He was never charged with any offence associated with the armed robbery or the riots.

Michael wrote his mother an apology in the form of a poem, subsequently published in The Voice newspaper. Michael attempted to help the community recover; he ran a youth football team, trying to provide a fun alternative to crime.

Today a reformed character, Michael is a published poet who runs poetry, personal development and motivational workshops in schools under the project title "Cherry Blossoms", and gives talks to dissuade others from making mistakes similar to those that he made.

=== Metropolitan Police Service ===
Following the trial of Inspector Lovelock, a review of firearms procedures within the Metropolitan Police led to new policy which authorised only centrally-controlled specifically trained specialist squads to be armed. This included parts of Special Branch, but excluded others including CID officers.

In March 2014, almost 29 years after the events and almost three years after her death, the Metropolitan Police publicly apologised to Cherry Groce's family for her wrongful shooting.

== Cultural references ==
- Lorna Gee's song "Brixton Rock" (1985) was written in response to both the 1981 and the 1985 Brixton riots. It was the shooting of her sister, Cherry Groce, that led to the 1985 riots happening.
- The 1986 Pet Shop Boys song "Suburbia", telling a story of boredom and (fictional) riots in suburbia, was partially influenced by the Brixton riots of 1981 and 1985, the latter of which was in recent memory when the single was released.
- The 1987 film Sammy and Rosie Get Laid opens with an incident very similar to the Groce shooting.
- The Law & Order: UK episode I Predict A Riot, first aired 26 March 2014, is about a fictional black undercover policeman who went missing during the 1985 Brixton riot.
- The first episode of the three part series Life of Crime (May 2013) is set during the riot and uses the riot as a backdrop for a critical plot element.

== See also ==
- 1981 Brixton riot
- 1995 Brixton riot
- Broadwater Farm riot
- Eleanor Bumpurs
- "The Guns of Brixton"
- Urban riots
