= Michael Groce =

British poet and campaigner

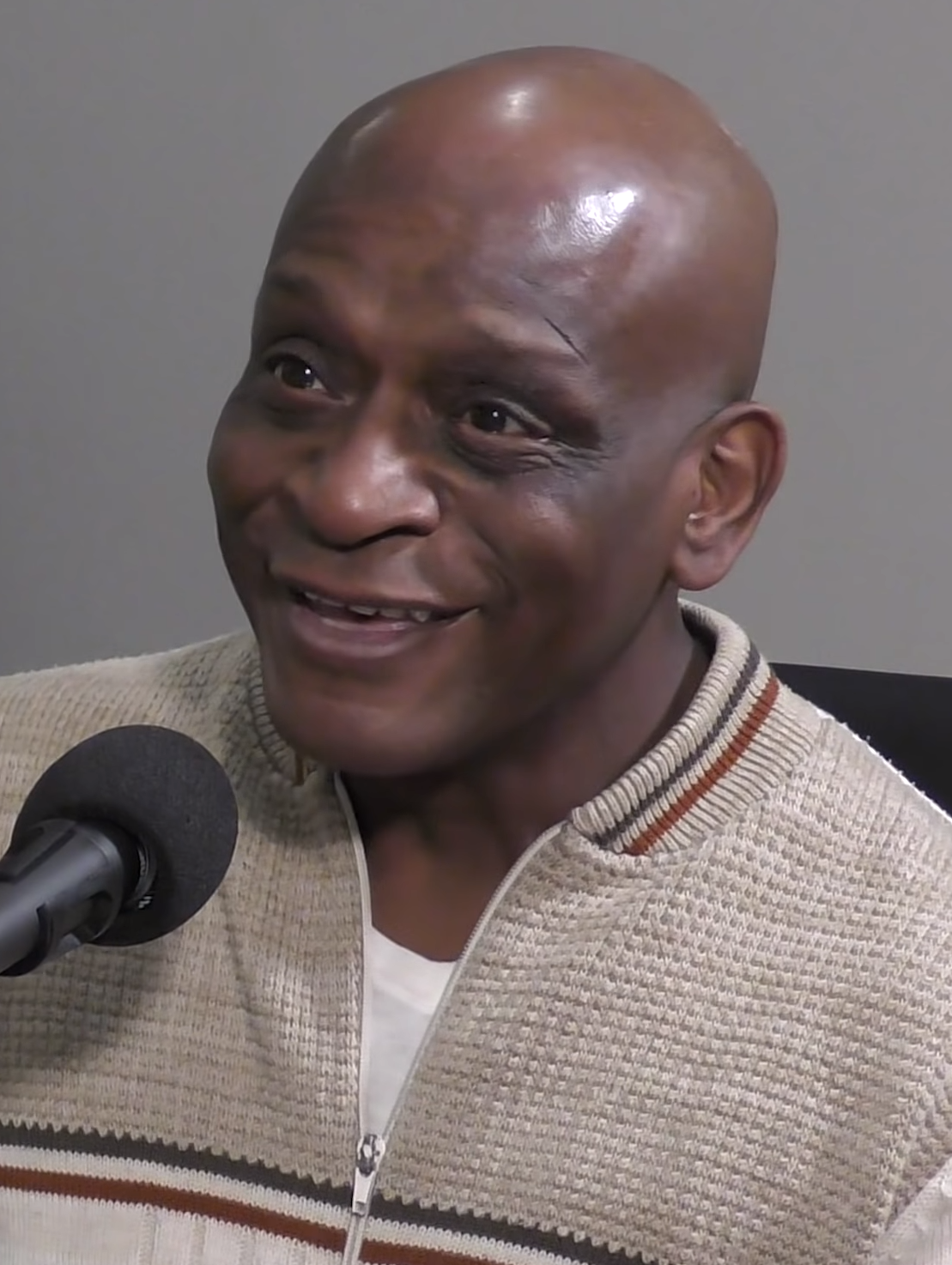
- Groce in 2021

Personal details
- Party: Green Party of England and Wales

Michael Groce is a poet and community worker. His mother, Cherry Groce, was shot and paralysed by police during a dawn raid on her home starting the 1985 Brixton riot in London, England. He is now a published poet, having won the Cheltenham Poetry Prize, and actively engages with young people to inform them of his own experiences.

== Early biography ==
Michael Groce was brought up in Tinworth House, on a housing estate in Vauxhall, London. This area at the time showed high levels of deprivation. Much of his life from age six was spent in residential care. He was involved with street gangs, and had been exposed to guns during his childhood. He spent time in and out of prison; throughout his life, he accrued 50 convictions and 15 different spells in prison.

== 1985 Brixton riot ==
In September of 1985 the Metropolitan Police raided the house of Cherry Groce, Michael's mother. They were looking for Michael, who they believed was connected to a robbery, but he was not there at the time. During the raid, the police mistakenly shot Cherry Groce, and she was seriously injured. The spreading news of the shooting is cited as one of the causes of the 1985 Brixton riot

Michael Brixton turned himself into the police three days later.

== Community work ==
Following the riots, Michael Groce attempted to help the community recover - he ran a youth football team, trying to provide a fun alternative to crime.

He now runs poetry, personal development and motivational workshops in schools, and gives talks to dissuade others from making mistakes similar to those he made.

== Political activity ==
In May 2018, Groce ran as the Green Party candidate in the Lambeth Council Elections where he stood in the Coldharbour ward. He polled 761 votes (15.3%) finishing the runner up in fourth place out of thirteen candidates.

Later that year, Groce was selected as the Green candidate for the Coldharbour by-election where he again finished in second place with 31% of the vote (912 votes), with an increase of almost 16%.

== Poetry ==
Groce is also a poet. He wrote poetry in prison, often at the request of other inmates to send in letters to partners or family. He won the Cheltenham Literature Festival Poetry Slam, and owns his own performance club.
