= Broadwater Farm riot =

1985 London riot

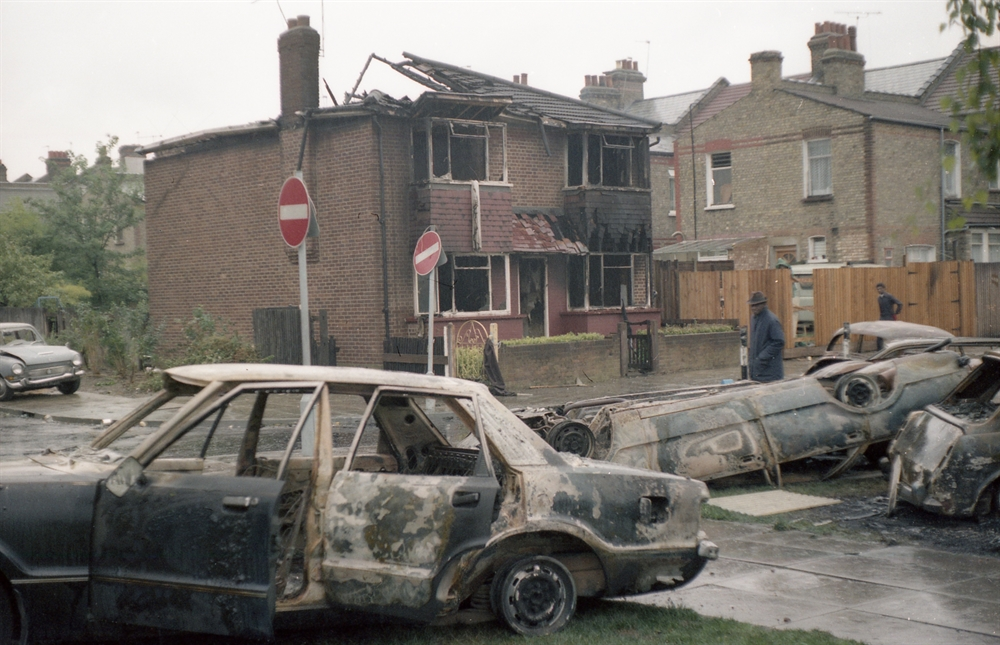
Broadwater Farm riot: the next day

The Broadwater Farm riot occurred on the Broadwater council estate in Tottenham, North London, on 6 October 1985.

The events of the day were dominated by two deaths. The first was that of 48-year-old Cynthia Jarrett (June 1937 — 5 October 1985), a Jamaican woman, born in Clarendon, Jamaica, who had died the previous day due to heart failure during a police search at her home. It was one of the main triggers of the riot, in a context where tensions between local black youth and the Metropolitan Police were already high, due to a combination of local issues and the aftermath of the 1985 Brixton riot which had occurred the previous week, following the shooting of a black woman, Cherry Groce, during another police search. The second death was the murder of Keith Blakelock, the third police officer since 1833 to be killed in a riot in Britain (all three being in the Metropolitan Police).

== Police encounter with Cynthia Jarrett ==
External image
- Cynthia Jarrett; PA Images via Getty Images

At 13:00 hrs on 5 October 1985, a young black man, Floyd Jarrett, who lived about a mile from the Farm, was arrested by police, having been stopped in a vehicle with an allegedly suspicious car tax disc. He was taken to nearby Tottenham police station and charged with theft and assault (he was later acquitted of both charges). Five and a half hours later, D.C. Randall and three other officers decided to search his mother's home, also close by. Forty-eight-year-old Cynthia Jarrett immediately collapsed and died from a heart attack during disputed circumstances. During the coroner's inquest into Mrs Jarrett's death, her daughter, Patricia claimed to have seen D.C. Randall push her mother whilst conducting the search inside their house, causing her to fall. Randall denied this allegation.

Jarrett's death sparked outrage from some members of the black community against the conduct of the Metropolitan Police. There was a widespread belief, later confirmed to be accurate by two extensive inquiries, that the police were institutionally racist, following Cherry Groce's shooting by police a week earlier. In particular, the local council leader, Bernie Grant, later condemned the search and urged the local police chiefs to resign immediately as their behaviour had been "out of control".

== Day of disturbances ==
There was a demonstration the following day outside Tottenham police station by a small crowd of people. Violence between police and youths escalated during the day. Riot police tried to clear streets using baton charges. The youths in the conflict used bricks and Molotov cocktails, resulting in many injuries as well as extensive damage to property and vehicles.

The evening TV news reported there were shots at the police, with two officers, PC Stuart Patt, and another unnamed officer being treated for gunshot wounds. Three journalists (Press Association reporter Peter Woodman, BBC sound recordist Robin Green, and cameraman Keith Skinner) were also said to have been hit. Cars were set on fire and barricades made, while one house on the edge of the estate was severely damaged by fire. The main conflict took place at the centre of the estate itself, with police officers and rioters injured, and dozens of people arrested.

== Murder of PC Blakelock ==
At 9.30pm, police and the London Fire Brigade responded to reports of a fire on the elevated level of Tangmere House; this block consisted of a shopping level with flats and maisonettes above. The location itself was some distance away from the main body of rioting, and as such was being policed by units who were less well-equipped and well-prepared in terms of disorder training. The London Fire Brigade came under attack, as did the 'serial' of police, including Blakelock, who was there to assist. The rioting was too intense for police untrained in riot control, and they and the firefighters withdrew, chased by rioters. Blakelock tripped, fell, and was surrounded by a mob with machetes, knives and other weapons, who killed him in an attempt to decapitate him. PC Richard Coombes suffered a serious facial injury from one of the attackers when he made efforts to rescue his colleague. The rioting tailed off during the night as rain fell and news of the death spread.

== Aftermath ==
Police maintained a substantial presence on the estate for several months, arresting and questioning 400 people. The disturbances led to changes in police tactics and equipment, and efforts to re-engage with the community. Bernie Grant, then leader of the Labour-controlled Haringey Council, later elected as Labour MP for Tottenham, was widely condemned for reportedly saying, "the police got a bloody good hiding" (although the actual statement was "the youth think they gave the police a bloody good hiding").

Afterwards, the local council invested in the estate to improve some of the problems which were seen as factors in the rioting. By 2016, and although there is reportedly still contention with the police, the area has improved.

The riot prompted the Metropolitan Police to devise the Gold-silver-bronze command structure for responding to sudden major incidents. Among the difficulties with the police response was that orders had to be communicated through numerous ranks, and it was never clear who was in operational charge.

== Trials ==
Six people (three juveniles and three adults) were charged with the murder of PC Blakelock. The juveniles all had their cases dismissed after the judge ruled the conditions in which they had been held were so inappropriate that their interrogation was inadmissible; conditions included being questioned naked except for a blanket, and being questioned without a guardian.

In March 1987, three local men, Winston Silcott, Engin Raghip and Mark Braithwaite, were convicted of murder and sentenced to life imprisonment, despite no witnesses and no forensic evidence. The Tottenham Three are Innocent Campaign and the Broadwater Farm Defence Campaign pressed for a retrial. On 25 November 1991, all three defendants were cleared by the Court of Appeal when an ESDA test demonstrated police notes of interrogations (the only evidence) had been tampered with. Braithwaite and Raghip were released after four years in prison. Silcott remained in prison for the separate murder of another man, Tony Smith, which occurred in December 1984 in the Tottenham area, and for which he was convicted in February 1986. He was released on licence in October 2003 after serving 18 years in prison, a 14-year recommended minimum having been issued by the trial judge.

The officer in charge of the interrogation of Silcott and the other two men was cleared of perjury. In July 2013, Nicholas Jacobs was charged with the murder of PC Blakelock. Four other men arrested at the same time were not charged. On 9 April 2014, Jacobs was cleared of all charges.

== Inquest ==
At the inquest into the death of Cynthia Jarrett her daughter, Patricia, told the court that her mother had been pushed over by Detective Constable Michael Randle, which he denied. The inquest found that Jarrett had died accidentally. No police officers were charged or disciplined for her death.

== Broadwater Farm memo controversy ==
In 1985, Oliver Letwin and Hartley Booth co-authored a memo as members of then-Prime Minister Margaret Thatcher's policy unit in response to Broadwater Farm, urging "Thatcher to ignore reports that rioting in mainly black urban areas was the result of social deprivation and racism." The Broadwater Farm riot had been sparked by a riot in Brixton; over the following weeks and months, riots also broke out in Peckham, Toxteth and at the Broadwater Farm estate.

In 1985, Letwin was then considered to be a "young star" of the Conservative Party. The memo scorned suggestions by senior cabinet ministers to set up a £10m communities programme to tackle inner-city problems by helping black people start businesses, as suggested by David Young, refurbishing public housing council blocks, as suggested by Kenneth Baker, and "establishing training programs for low-income youth." Letwin claimed it would not ameliorate the situation but would do little more than "subsidise Rastafarian arts and crafts workshops", stating that black "entrepreneurs will set up in the disco and drug trade".

When the 1985 paper was released under the 30 years rule into the public record through the National Archives on 30 December 2015, a chastened Letwin apologised on the same day for "the offence caused". The memo argued that the riots were caused by bad behaviour, rather than social conditions:

Lower-class, unemployed white people lived for years in appalling slums without a breakdown of public order on anything like the present scale; in the midst of the depression, people in Brixton went out, leaving their grocery money in a bag at the front door, and expecting to see groceries there when they got back...Riots, criminality and social disintegration are caused solely by individual characters and attitudes. So long as bad moral attitudes remain, all efforts to improve the inner cities will founder.

— Oliver Letwin, Hartley Booth Policy Broadwater Farm memo to Prime Minister Thatcher 1985 (released to the public domain on 30 December 2015)

== The Broadwater Farm Inquiry ==
Anthony Gifford, 6th Baron Gifford chaired a six-person panel for the Haringey London Borough Council, beginning in February 1986 and concluding in July 1986, called The Broadwater Farm Inquiry. The Gifford report was published in July 1986. Second Report of the Independent Inquiry into the disturbances of October 1985 at the Broadwater Farm Estate, Totthenham, chaired by Gifford was also published.

== See also ==
- 2011 England riots

== Bibliography ==
- Policeman killed in riot Street violence in Tottenham, North London
- Metropolitan Police history of the riot
- On this day – 6 October. BBC News online.
- Graef (1990). Talking Blues: Police in their own words. Fontana Press. ISBN 0-00-637525-1
- MP caught up in drive-by shooting. (7 April 2005). BBC News online.
- Christian Wolmar. It's no surprise concrete estates never worked
- Scott, Stafford (7 December 2003). "End this Blakelock obsession". The Guardian
- Scott, Stafford (7 October 2005) "Sacrifice of a generation".The Guardian
- Man arrested over 1985 murder of Pc Keith Blakelock, Bury St. Edmunds
