= 2010 New Year Honours =

British royal recognitions

The New Year Honours 2010 were announced on 31 December 2009 in the United Kingdom, New Zealand, Cook Islands, Barbados, Grenada, Papua New Guinea, Solomon Islands, Saint Lucia, Belize, Antigua and Barbuda, Saint Christopher and Nevis and other Commonwealth realms to celebrate the year passed and mark the beginning of 2010.

The 2010 New Year Honours were unusual in that none of the 121 Members of Parliament (MPs) who had announced their retirement at the next general election received honours. This was perceived to be a reaction to a series of parliamentary scandals in 2009 which had diminished the public opinion of politicians. There were few honours for people from the financial services sector either, after the AIG bonus payments controversy. (One notable exception was Dyfrig John, a former deputy chairman/chief executive of HSBC, a bank which did not require a taxpayer bail-out. Dyfrig John was named CBE.)

The recipients of honours are displayed here as they were styled before their new honour, and arranged by the country whose ministers advised The Queen on the appointments, then by honour, with grades i.e. Knight/Dame Grand Cross, Knight/Dame Commander etc. and then if appropriate, divisions (i.e. Military and Civil).

== United Kingdom ==
=== Knights Bachelor ===
- Professor Mansel Aylward, CB, Chairman, Wales Centre for Health. For services to Healthcare.
- Paul John James Britton, CB, lately Director-General and Head, Economic and Domestic Affairs Secretariat, Cabinet Office.
- Professor Robert George Burgess, Vice-Chancellor, University of Leicester. For services to local and national Higher Education.
- Professor John Burn, Professor of Clinical Genetics, Newcastle University. For services to Medicine.
- Professor David Alan Chipperfield, CBE, Architect and CEO, David Chipperfield Architects. For services to architecture in the UK and Germany.
- Jonathan Stephen Cunliffe, CB, Second Permanent Secretary and Head of International Economic Affairs, Europe and G8 Sherpa, Prime Minister's Office.
- Andrew Patrick Dillon, CBE, Chief Executive, National Institute for Health and Clinical Excellence. For services to Healthcare.
- Ian David Grant, CBE, lately Chairman, The Crown Estate.
- Professor John Stranger Holman, National Director, Science, Technology, Engineering and Mathematics Programme. For services to Education.
- Nicholas Hytner, Director, National Theatre. For services to Drama.
- Mark Ellis Powell Jones, Director, Victoria and Albert Museum. For services to the Arts.
- Dr. Ralph Kohn, FRS. For services to Science, Music and to Charity.
- Richard Douglas Lapthorne, CBE, Chairman, Cable & Wireless plc. For services to telecommunications.
- Michael John Marshall, CBE, Chairman, Marshall of Cambridge (Holdings) Ltd. For services to Business, Charity and to the community in Cambridgeshire.
- Ian Robert McGeechan, OBE. For services to Rugby.
- Professor Paul Anthony Mellars, FBA, Professor of Prehistory and Human Evolution, University of Cambridge. For services to Scholarship.
- Professor Salvador Moncada, Director, Wolfson Institute of Biomedical Research, University College London. For services to Science.
- Erich Arieh Reich, Chairman, Kindertransport Group, Association of Jewish Refugees. For charitable services.
- Professor Michael Adrian Richards, CBE, National Cancer Director. For services to Medicine.
- His Honour Mota Singh. For services to the Administration of Justice, Community Relations and to the Voluntary Sector.
- Patrick Stewart, OBE, Actor. For services to Drama.
- Graham Robert Wynne, CBE, Chief Executive, Royal Society for the Protection of Birds. For services to Nature Conservation.

=== Order of the Bath ===
==== Knights Commander of the Order of the Bath (KCB) ====
Military Division

Army

- Lieutenant General William Raoul Rollo, CBE, late The Blues and Royals (Royal Horse Guards and 1st Dragoons)
- Lieutenant General Alexander Richard David Shirreff, CBE, late The King's Royal Hussars

Civil Division

- David Nicholson CBE

==== Companions of the Order of the Bath (CB) ====
Military Division

Royal Navy

- The Venerable John Green, QHC
- Rear Admiral Richard Derek Leaman, OBE

Army

- Major General Simon Francis Neil Lalor, TD, late The Honourable Artillery Company, Territorial Army
- Lieutenant General Simon Vincent Mayall, late 1st The Queen's Dragoon Guards
- Lieutenant General Peter Thomas Clayton Pearson, CBE, late The Royal Gurkha Rifles

Royal Air Force

- The Reverend (Air Vice-Marshal) Peter Watson Mills

Civil Division

- Christopher Bolt, Arbiter, London Underground Public Private Partnership Agreements and lately chairman, Office of Rail Regulation, Department for Transport
- Lawrence Conway, lately Director, Department of the First Minister, Welsh Assembly Government
- Gloria Linda Craig, director, International Security Policy, Ministry of Defence
- Elizabeth Anne Jackson, director, Child Wellbeing, Children and Families Directorate, Department for Children, Schools and Families
- Helen Kilpatrick, Director-General, Financial and Commercial, Home Office
- William Francis Sebastian Rickett, Director-General of Energy, Department for Energy and Climate Change.

=== Order of Saint Michael and Saint George ===
==== Knights / Dames Commander of the Order of St. Michael and St. George (KCMG / DCMG) ====
Civil Division

- Dr. Fazle Hasan Abed, Founder and Chairman, Building Resources Across Communities (BRAC). For services to tackling poverty and empowering the poor in Bangladesh and more globally.
- Dr. Rosalind Mary Marsden, CMG, H.M. Ambassador, Sudan.
- Anne Fyfe Pringle, CMG, H.M. Ambassador, Russia.

==== Companions of the Order of St. Michael and St. George (CMG) ====
Military Division

Army

- Brigadier Stephen Frederick Sherry, OBE, late Corps of Royal Engineers

Civil Division

- Timothy Michael Everton Dowse, lately Chief of Assessments Staff, Joint Intelligence Organisation, Cabinet Office
- Dr. Silvia Suzen Giovanna Casale, lately Chairperson, UN Sub-Committee on the Prevention of Torture, Geneva. Lately Member, European Committee for the Prevention of Torture, Strasbourg. For services to the prevention of torture, and prison reform
- Susan le Jeune d'Allegeershecque, Counsellor, Foreign and Commonwealth Office
- The Right Honourable Terence Davis, lately Secretary General, Council of Europe, Strasbourg. For services to institutional reform
- Charles Blandford Farr, OBE, Counsellor, Foreign and Commonwealth Office
- William Boyd McCleary, CVO, British High Commissioner, Malaysia
- Edward Mortimer, Senior Vice-President and Chief Program Officer, The Salzburg Global Seminar, Austria. For services to international communications and journalism
- Hugh Powell, lately UK Senior Representative in Helmand, Afghanistan
- Michael Peter Wareing, International CEO, KPMG, and lately co-Chair, Basra Development Commission. For services to the economic reconstruction and redevelopment of Basra, and Iraq more generally

=== Royal Victorian Order ===
==== Knights Commander of the Royal Victorian Order (KCVO) ====
- The Right Reverend David John Conner – Dean of Windsor
- William Arthur Bromley-Davenport – Lord-Lieutenant of Cheshire
- Angus Durie Miller Farquharson, OBE, – Lord-Lieutenant of Aberdeenshire
- Robin Denys Gill, CVO – Chairman, The Royal Anniversary Trust
- Peter Gwynn-Jones, CVO – Garter Principal King of Arms

==== Commanders of the Royal Victorian Order (CVO) ====
- Gregory Scott Belton – Chairman, The Duke of Edinburgh's International Award Association
- Robin Shedden Broadhurst, CBE – formerly Member of Council, Duchy of Cornwall
- Romayne Winifred, Lady Carswell, OBE – formerly Lord-Lieutenant of the County Borough of Belfast
- Alexander Pieter van Heeren, MBE – Chairman, The World Fellowship of The Duke of Edinburgh's International Award Association
- John Henry Pascoe, AO – formerly Trustee, The Duke of Edinburgh's International Award Association

==== Lieutenants of the Royal Victorian Order (LVO) ====
- Major Charles Samuel Enderby – formerly Lieutenant, The Queen's Body Guard of the Yeomen of the Guard
- Patrick Gregory Birch Harrison – Press Secretary, Household of The Prince of Wales and The Duchess of Cornwall
- Charles Benedict Morris – Architectural Designer
- Dr. Kirsten Aschengreen Piacenti – for services to the Royal Collection (Honorary)
- Brigadier John Edward Bruce Smedley – Private Secretary to The Earl and Countess of Wessex
- Dr. Anthony Douglas Toft, CBE – formerly Physician to The Queen in Scotland
- Richard John Verrall – Aviation Consultant

==== Members of the Royal Victorian Order (MVO) ====
- David Anderson, MBE – formerly Hospitality Manager, Hillsborough Castle, Northern Ireland Office
- Inspector Mark Peter Andrews – Metropolitan Police, for services to Royalty Protection
- Catherine Carruthers – Membership Development Director, Business in the Community
- Julian Charles George Clare, RVM – Drawings Conservator, Royal Collection
- Kenneth Brendan Eccles – for services to the Police Service of Northern Ireland
- Patricia Ann Lawrence – Personal Assistant to The Duke of Kent
- Paul Alexander Miller – IT Projects and Business Manager
- Roger Peter Smith – formerly Clerk of Works, Crown Estate, Windsor
- Peter Charles Taylor – Fire Safety Manager, Windsor Castle
- Christopher Robin Weatherley – Fire Safety Manager, Buckingham Palace
- Andrew James Wilson, DL – Under Sheriff, The Bailiwick of Lancashire

=== Royal Victorian Medal ===
==== Bar to the Royal Victorian Medal (Silver) ====
- Anthony John Hardingham, RVM – Tractor Driver, Sandringham Estate

==== Royal Victorian Medal (Silver) ====
- Glen Andrew Beveridge – Executive Butler, Government House, Melbourne
- Patricia Joyce Earl – Housekeeper, Sandringham House
- Constable Kevin Gande – Metropolitan Police, for services to Royalty Protection
- Andrea Elizabeth Hudson – Cook, Royal Lodge
- Beverley Jones – Assistant Dresser to The Queen
- George David Main – Gamekeeper, Balmoral Estate
- David James McIntosh – Security Office Team Leader, Palace of Holyroodhouse
- Vivienne Oates – Linen Room Assistant, Buckingham Palace
- Richard Sands – Yeoman Warder, HM Tower of London

=== Order of the British Empire ===
==== Knights / Dames Commander of the Order of the British Empire (KBE / DBE) ====
Civil Division

- Professor Valerie Beral. For services to Science
- Dr. Claire Bertschinger. For services to Nursing and to International Humanitarian Aid
- Councillor Ellen Margaret Eaton, OBE, Chair, Local Government Association. For services to Local Government
- Dr. Susan Elizabeth Ion, OBE, Visiting Professor, Imperial College, London and Chair, UK Fusion Advisory Board. For services to Science and Engineering
- Clare Oriana Tickell, Chief Executive, Action for Children. For services to Young People
- Marcia Twelftree, lately Headteacher, Charters School, Windsor and Maidenhead, Berkshire. For services to local and national Education

==== Commanders of the Order of the British Empire (CBE) ====
Military Division

Royal Navy

- Commodore Stephen Redvers Kirby
- Commodore Christopher Laurence Palmer

Army

- Colonel Mark Cuthbert-Brown – late Adjutant General's Corps (Royal Military Police)
- Colonel David James Eadie – late The Queen's Royal Lancers
- Colonel Christopher William Manning – late Army Air Corps
- Brigadier Simon John Marriner, MBE – late Adjutant General's Corps (Staff and Personnel Support Branch)
- Colonel Michael Peter Macgregor Stewart, QHS – late Royal Army Medical Corps

Royal Air Force

- Air Commodore Clive Arthur Bairsto
- Group Captain Keith Ronald Dipper
- Group Captain Alistair Monkman
- Group Captain Andrew Mark Turner, OBE

Civil Division

- James Christopher Armfield, OBE. For services to the community in Lancashire.
- David Ogilvy Barrie, lately Director, Art Fund. For services to the Visual Arts.
- Parmajit Paul Singh Bassi, DL, Chairman, Bond Wolfe. For services to Business and to the community in the West Midlands.
- William Robert Baxter, Deputy Chief Executive, Baxter Storey. For services to the Catering Industry.
- Ann Beasley, Director of Finance and Performance, National Offender Management Service, Ministry of Justice.
- Edward Farquharson Bowen, Sheriff Principal of Lothian and Borders. For services to the Administration of Justice in Scotland.
- Councillor Peter Box, Leader, Wakefield Metropolitan District Council and chairman, Yorkshire and Humber Assembly. For services to Local Government.
- Professor Donal Donat Conor Bradley, FRS, Lee-Lucas Professor of Experimental Physics and Deputy Principal, Faculty of Natural Sciences, Imperial College London. For services to Science.
- Professor Alice Brown, lately Scottish Public Services Ombudsman. For public service.
- Natalie Ceeney, Chief Executive, National Archives, Ministry of Justice.
- Lauran Margaret Chatburn, Principal and Chief Executive, Bury College. For services to Further Education.
- Professor David Martin Chiddick, lately Vice-Chancellor, University of Lincoln. For services to local and national Higher Education.
- Lawrence Churchill, Chairman, Pension Protection Fund. For public service.
- Robert Brodie Clark, Head of Border Force, UK Border Agency, Home Office.
- Barry Michael Cockcroft, Chief Dental Officer, Department of Health.
- Christopher Cohen, lately Chairman, Athletics Sports Assembly Executive Committee, International Paralympic Committee. For services to Sport.
- Sarah Patricia Connolly, Opera Singer. For services to Classical Music.
- Rodney Cousens, Chief Executive Officer, Codemasters. For services to the Computer Games Industry.
- Dr. Michael John Cresswell, Director-General, Assessment and Qualifications Alliance. For services to Education.
- Professor Ian Richard Crute, lately Director, Rothamsted Research. For services to Plant Science.
- His Honour Judge Keith Charles Cutler, Circuit Judge. For services to the Administration of Justice.
- Dr. George Daniels, MBE, Master Watchmaker. For services to Horology.
- Professor Janet Howard Darbyshire, OBE, Director, Clinical Trials Unit, Medical Research Council. For services to Clinical Science.
- Helen Anne Dent, Chief Executive, Family Action. For services to Children and Families.
- Graham Thomas Devlin. For services to the Arts.
- Professor Carol Dezateux, Professor of Paediatric Epidemiology, UCL Institute of Child Health. For services to Science.
- Mary Elizabeth Dodd, lately Consultant Physiotherapist, Cystic Fibrosis, South Manchester University Hospital NHS Trust. For services to Healthcare.
- Peter Donohoe, Pianist, for services to Classical Music.
- Trudi Margaret Elliott, Regional Director, Government Office for the West Midlands, Department for Communities and Local Government.
- Margaret Fay, OBE. For services to the Regional Development Agency, One North East.
- George Ferguson. For services to Architecture and to the community in the South West.
- Professor Stephen John Field, Head of Workforce and Regional Postgraduate Dean, NHS West Midlands and Chairman of College Council, Royal College of General Practitioners. For services to Medicine.
- Christopher Mark Fisher, Director, Jobseekers and Skills, Employment Group, Department for Work and Pensions.
- Professor Alastair Hugh Fitter, FRS, Pro-Vice-Chancellor for Research, University of York. For services to Environmental Science.
- Brian Roy Fleet, MBE, Senior Airbus UK Vice-President. For services to the Aerospace Industry.
- His Honour Judge David Robert Fletcher, Circuit Judge. For services to the Administration of Justice in Merseyside.
- Winston Fletcher, lately Chairman, Advertising Standards Board of Finance. For services to the Creative Industries.
- Neil Raymond Flint, Deputy Director, New Academies Division, Department for Children, Schools and Families.
- Helen Fraser, lately Managing Director, Penguin UK. For services to the Publishing Industry.
- Professor John Fyfe. For services to Partnership Working and to Regeneration Worldwide, particularly in West Cumbria.
- David Goldstone. For public service.
- Anthony Simonds-Gooding, Chairman, D&AD. For services to the Creative Industries.
- Professor Sean Patrick Gorman, Dean, Faculty of Medicine, Health and Life Sciences and Professor of Pharmaceutical Microbiology, Queen's University Belfast. For services to Healthcare.
- Lucian Charles Grainge, Chairman and Chief Executive Officer, Universal Music Group International. For services to the Creative Industries.
- Robert Douglas Greig, Chief Executive, National Development Team for Inclusion. For services to People with Special Needs.
- Bethan Haulwen Guilfoyle, Headteacher, Treorchy Comprehensive School. For services to Education in Wales.
- Maggi Hambling, OBE, Painter and Sculptor. For services to Art.
- Ian Hardie, Deputy Director, Corporation Tax and VAT, Business Tax, H.M. Revenue and Customs.
- Dr. Christopher Charles Harling, Director, NHS Plus. For services to Occupational Health.
- Martin Harman. For services to International Trade and to the Legal Profession.
- Dr. Colin Robert Harrison, Chairman, Chemistry Innovation Knowledge Transfer Network. For services to Technology.
- Emma Harrison, Chair, A4e. For services to Unemployed People and to the Voluntary Sector.
- Frances Hartley, lately Headteacher, Deans Primary School, Salford. For services to Education.
- Sally Lorinda Hobbs, HM Deputy Chief Inspector, Crown Prosecution Service Inspectorate.
- Peter Michael Holland, QFSM, Chief Fire Officer, Lancashire Fire and Rescue Service. For services to Local Government.
- Timothy Stancliffe Hollis, QPM, Chief Constable, Humberside Police. For services to the Police.
- Helen Jackson. For services to the Women and Pensions Network and to the community in South Yorkshire.
- Dyfrig Dafydd Joseff John, lately Deputy Chairman and Chief Executive, HSBC Bank. For services to the Financial Services Industry.
- Penny Johnson, Director, Government Art Collection, Department for Culture, Media and Sport.
- Julie Jones, OBE, Chief Executive, Social Care Institute for Excellence. For services to Local Government.
- Robert Jones, lately Chairman, Association of Police Authorities. For services to the Police.
- Professor Peter Graham Edward Kennedy, Burton Professor of Neurology, University of Glasgow. For services to Clinical Science.
- Lowri Alice Khan, Team Leader, Intervention, Strategy and Markets Team, H.M. Treasury.
- Paul Leighton, QPM, lately Deputy Chief Constable, Police Service of Northern Ireland. For services to the Police.
- Rosa Lady Lipworth. For charitable services.
- Phyllida Lloyd, Theatre Director. For services to Drama.
- James Loughran, Conductor. For services to Classical Music.
- David Clifford Loughton, Chief Executive, Royal Wolverhampton Hospitals NHS Trust. For services to Healthcare.
- Ian David Luder, lately Lord Mayor of the City of London. For public service.
- Mary Elizabeth Madden. For public service.
- Professor Robert James Mair, FREng FICE FRS, Master of Jesus College and Professor of Geotechnical Engineering, University of Cambridge. For services to Engineering.
- Hew Mathewson, President, General Dental Council. For services to Healthcare.
- Professor Denise Angela McAlister, Pro-Vice-Chancellor, Teaching and Learning, University of Ulster. For services to Higher Education in Northern Ireland.
- William David McWilliam, Superintendent, Merseyside Police. For services to the Police and to Young People.
- David Leonard Moore, lately Her Majesty's Inspector of Education and Assistant Divisional Manager, Ofsted.
- Candy Morris, Chief Executive, NHS South East Coast Strategic Health Authority. For services to Healthcare.
- Diana Lesley Morrison, Headteacher, St. Martin-in-the-Fields High School for Girls, Lambeth, London. For services to local and national Education.
- Stephen Thurston Munby, Chief Executive, National College for Leadership of Schools and Children's Services. For services to Education.
- Professor Adrian Charles Newland, Professor of Haematology and director, Pathology Clinical Academic Unit, Barts and the London NHS Trust. For services to Medicine.
- Dr. William Gerard O'Hare, Chairman, University of Ulster Foundation. For services to Higher Education and to Regeneration in Northern Ireland.
- David Malcolm Orr, Director Corporate Services, Department of Finance and Personnel, Northern Ireland Executive.
- John Scott Perry, Chief Executive, Scottish Enterprise. For services to Business.
- Dr. David Price, Chief Executive, Chemring Group plc. For services to the Defence Industry.
- Imelda Redmond, Chief Executive, Carers UK. For services to Disadvantaged People.
- Dr. Sian Eluned Rees, Inspector of Ancient Monuments, Cadw, Welsh Assembly Government.
- Caroline Mary Rookes, Director, Planning for Retirement and Older People, Department for Work and Pensions.
- Tessa Sarah Ross (Mrs. Scantlebury), Controller of Film and Drama, Channel 4. For services to Broadcasting.
- Alastair Eric Hotson Salvesen. For services to the Arts and to Charity in Scotland.
- Graham Edward Sheffield, Artistic Director, Barbican Centre, London. For services to the Arts.
- Adrian Shooter, Chairman, Chiltern Railway Company Ltd. For services to the Rail Industry.
- Ruth Sims, OBE. For voluntary service to Palliative Care in Uganda.
- John Brian Sinnott, Chief Executive, Leicestershire County Council. For services to Local Government.
- Professor Christopher John Skinner, FBA, Professor, Southampton Statistical Sciences Research Institute, University of Southampton. For services to Social Science.
- Paul Spencer, lately Chairman, National Savings and Investments. For services to the Financial Services Industry.
- Janice Stevens, National Director, Healthcare Associated Infections Programme, Department of Health. For services to Nursing.
- Professor William James Swindall, OBE, Consulting Director, QUILL Centre, Queen's University Belfast. For services to Environmental Science.
- Kathleen Thomas, Principal, Oldham College, Manchester. For services to Further Education.
- Margaret Maud Tyzack, OBE, Actress. For services to Drama.
- Professor Karen Vousden, FRS FRSE FMedSci, Director, Beatson Institute for Cancer Research. For services to Clinical Science.
- Susan Toni Wardell, Director, Middle East, Caribbean, Asia (East, Central) and British Overseas Territories, Department for International Development.
- John David Whittaker, Deputy Director, Employment Policy, Cabinet Office.
- Vanessa Wiseman, lately Headteacher, Langdon School and Sports College, Newham, London. For services to Education.
- John Briscoe Wright. For services to the Federation of Small Businesses.
- Professor Michael Wright, DL, Vice-Chancellor, Canterbury Christ Church University. For services to Higher Education and to the community in Kent.

Diplomatic and Overseas List

- Larry Thomas Dennis, lately Auditor General of Bermuda. For services to good governance in Bermuda.
- Rabbi David Shlomo Rosen, Honorary Adviser on Interfaith relations to the Chief Rabbinate of Israel. For services to interfaith relations in the Middle East, and between the UK and Israel.

==== Officers of the Order of the British Empire (OBE) ====
Military Division

Royal Navy

- Commander Nicholas Trevor Blackman
- Commander Richard George Fox
- Commander David John Hunkin
- Commander Charles David Lightfoot
- Commander Peter Moss
- Commander Gerard Rodney Northwood

Army

- Lieutenant Colonel Allan Barnes – Coldstream Guards
- Colonel John Etherington – late Royal Army Medical Corps
- Lieutenant Colonel Alexander Gilbert Carew Hatherley – Grenadier Guards
- Colonel Ian David MacLeod – Bedfordshire and Hertfordshire Army Cadet Force
- Colonel Iain George David Moles, QVRM TD – late Royal Army Medical Corps, Territorial Army
- Lieutenant Colonel Leanda Jane Pitt, TD DL – The Royal Logistic Corps, Territorial Army
- Lieutenant Colonel John Richard James Powell – The Princess of Wales's Royal Regiment
- Lieutenant Colonel Mark Reginald Rusby – The Mercian Regiment
- Lieutenant Colonel Andrew John Teskey – Corps of Royal Electrical and Mechanical Engineers

Royal Air Force

- Wing Commander Stephen Robert Chaskin
- Wing Commander Mark Nicholas Day
- Wing Commander Simon Andrew Harper
- Wing Commander Jonathan Peter Quentin Reid
- Wing Commander Malcolm Leslie Symonds
- Wing Commander Andrew David Wallis
- Wing Commander Robert Alan Woods

Civil Division

- William Abbott, National Security Adviser, Secure Mental Health Services, Department of Health. For services to Healthcare.
- Victor Akers, lately Manager, Arsenal Ladies' Football Team. For services to Sport.
- Professor Alan Alexander, Emeritus Professor of Local and Public Management, University of Strathclyde. For services to Social Science.
- Alexander Beveridge Anderson, D.L., Chairman of Governors, University of Teesside. For services to the community in the North East.
- Deirdre Anne, Mrs. Kinloch Anderson, Director, Kinloch Anderson. For services to the Textile Industry.
- John Huxley Fordyce Anderson. For services to St. Martin-in-the-Fields, London and to the Construction Industry.
- Craig Armstrong. For services to Music.
- Anthony John William Attard, Chief Executive, Panaz Ltd. For services to the Textile Industry and to International Trade.
- Sir Nicholas Hickman Ponsonby Bacon, Bt., D.L. For services to the community in Norfolk.
- Linda Margaret, Mrs. Costelloe Baker. For public service.
- Stuart Kemp Baker, Deputy Director, National Projects, Rail and National Networks, Department for Transport.
- Dr. Michael Thomas Barlow. For services to Intellectual Property Law.
- Professor Ann Barrett, Professor of Oncology and lately Deputy Head of School, University of East Anglia. For services to Healthcare.
- Ms Hillary Anna Bauer, Head, International and Cultural Property Unit, Department for Culture, Media and Sport.
- Ms Margaret Baxter. For services to the Voluntary Sector.
- Miss Ailsa Elizabeth Beaton, Director of Information, Metropolitan Police Service. For services to the Police.
- Alan Kenneth Bowers Beavis. For services to the Scouts.
- Dr. John William Beer, lately Executive Director of Social Services, Southampton City Council. For services to Local Government.
- Ms Anthea Bell. For services to Literature and to Literary Translations.
- Arlene, Mrs. Bell, Headteacher, Beechdale Nursery School, Durham. For services to local and national Early Years Education.
- Thomas Bell. For services to the Wooden Spoon Children's Charity.
- Madeleine Ponsonby, Countess of Bessborough. For services to the Visual Arts.
- Dr. Anthony Bernard Best. For services to the Education of Deafblind Children.
- Kay, Mrs. Bews, Chief Executive, Home-Start UK. For services to Children and Families.
- Professor Alison Blenkinsopp, Professor of the Practice of Pharmacy, Keele University. For services to Healthcare.
- Ronald John Bowers, Grade B2, Ministry of Defence.
- Paul Vincent Boyle, lately Chief Executive, Financial Reporting Council. For services to the Financial Services Industry and Accountancy.
- Ms Anne Elizabeth Brannagan, Complex Trauma Manager, Defence Medical Rehabilitation Centre, Headley Court, Surrey, Ministry of Defence.
- Ross Brawn, Team Principal, Brawn GP. For services to Motorsport.
- Dr. Michael Peter Briggs, lately Pro-Vice-Chancellor, Roehampton University. For services to Higher Education.
- Dr. Alison Fiona Campbell, Managing Director, King's College London Business Ltd. For services to Knowledge Transfer.
- Peter Carne, lately National Champion, Learning Outside the Classroom and Programme Manager, Growing Schools Programme. For services to Education.
- David Brian Cassells. For services to the Inland Waterways Association of Ireland.
- Eileen, Mrs. Cavalier (Mrs. Schatunowski), Founder, London College of Beauty Therapy. For services to Further Education.
- Pamela, Mrs. Challis, Leader, Castle Point Borough Council. For services to Local Government in South East Essex.
- Mavis Lurline, Mrs. Champagnie, Councillor, London Borough of Harrow. For services to Local Government and to Diversity.
- Captain Kandiah Chandran, M.B.E., Chief Executive, Preset Charitable Trust. For services to Young People in London.
- Gillian, Mrs. Coffey, Headteacher, Lynch Hill Foundation Primary School, Slough. For services to Education.
- Yvonne, Mrs. Coghill, National Lead, Breaking Through Programme, NHS Institute for Innovation and Improvement. For services to Healthcare.
- Maureen, Mrs. Cooke, Head of Capability and First Line Service Management, Customer Service Delivery, Corporate IT, Department for Work and Pensions.
- Gordon Raymond Couch. For services to disabled people.
- David John Cowie, lately District Manager, Jobcentre Plus, Forth Valley, Fife and Tayside, Department for Work and Pensions.
- John Andrew Craig, Chairman, British Record Industry Trust. For services to Music and to Charity.
- Mary Elizabeth, Mrs. Craig, Chief Executive, Lloyds TSB Foundation for Scotland. For services to the Voluntary Sector.
- Bruce Millson Crook, Grade B1, Ministry of Defence.
- Ms Frances Crook, Director, Howard League for Penal Reform. For services to Youth Justice.
- Neil Philip Cunliffe, Group Manager, Road Safety Group, Lancashire County Council. For services to Road Safety.
- Phillip Leyland Darnton, Chairman, Cycling England. For services to Transport.
- Frederick Geoffrey Davies, lately Chairman, Gwent Magistrates Bench and Wales Bench Chairmen's Forum. For services to the Administration of Justice.
- Derek John Davis, lately Chairman, Stoke-on-Trent and Staffordshire Combined Fire Authority. For services to Local Government.
- Amanda, Mrs. Deeks, Chief Executive Officer, South Gloucestershire Council and Founder, West of England Partnership for Bristol. For services to Local Government.
- Paul Deneen, J.P., D.L. For services to the community in Herefordshire and Worcestershire.
- John Henry Derbyshire, Sailing Coach and Manager. For services to Sport.
- Professor Fiona Devine, Professor of Sociology, University of Manchester. For services to Social Science.
- Ian Laidlaw-Dickson, Chairman, Hertfordshire Police Authority. For services to the Police.
- Michael Donnelly, Chief Executive Officer, Habinteg Housing Association. For services to the Housing Sector.
- Jacqueline Ann, Mrs. Dowell, Customer Operations Business Design Manager, H.M. Revenue and Customs.
- Professor Marcus Peter Francis du Sautoy, Professor of Mathematics, University of Oxford. For services to Science.
- Brigadier Hedley Dennis Cardew Duncan, M.B.E., lately Yeoman Usher of the Black Rod, House of Lords.
- Martin Donald Dunford, Chairman, Association of Learning Providers and Chief Executive, Skills Training UK. For services to Skills.
- Antony Dunne, Grade B1, Ministry of Defence.
- Dr. Linda Ebbatson, Leader, Chester-le-Street District Council. For services to Local Government.
- Ms Janette Morag Faherty, Chief Executive, TNG/ Avanta. For services to Unemployed People and to Entrepreneurship.
- Ms Julia Fawcett, Chief Executive, Lowry Centre, Salford Quays. For services to the Arts in the North West.
- Derek Forest, Detective Superintendent, West Midlands Police. For services to the Police.
- Diana, Mrs. Fulbrook, Chief Officer, Wiltshire Probation Area, Ministry of Justice.
- Elizabeth Laureen, Mrs. Fullerton, lately Chair, NHS Shetland. For services to Healthcare.
- Ms Lucy Diana Gampell (Mrs. Itkin), lately Director, Action for Prisoners' Families. For services to Disadvantaged People.
- Professor Mary Gibby, Director of Science, Royal Botanic Garden Edinburgh. For services to Botany.
- Captain Duncan Colin Glass, lately Director of Navigation Requirements, Trinity House, Department for Transport.
- Celia Jane, Mrs. Godsall. For services to Sport.
- Dr. James Desmond Hall, General Medical Practitioner, Belfast. For services to Healthcare.
- Ms Susan Elizabeth Hall, Chief Officer, West Yorkshire Probation Area, Ministry of Justice.
- Ms Catherine Graham-Harrison. For services to Heritage.
- David James Harrison. For services to Golf.
- Michael Clifford Hart, Director, Ffestinog Railway Company and Chairman, Welsh Highland Railway Construction Ltd. For services to the Rail Industry.
- Maurice Adrian Sylvester Heaster, Deputy Leader, Wandsworth Council. For services to Local Government.
- Elizabeth Irene, Mrs. Henderson, Network Nurse Director, Northern Ireland Cancer Network. For services to Healthcare.
- Tom Henderson. For services to Humanitarian Aid.
- Dr. Barbara Hendrie, lately Deputy Director, Iraq, Department for International Development.
- David Henry, Chairman, National Association for Mental Health. For services to Healthcare.
- Dr. Andrew James Herbert, Managing Director, Microsoft Research, Cambridge. For services to Computer Science.
- Donald Peter Herbert, Barrister. For voluntary service to Equality, Diversity and Human Rights.
- Ms Susan Ann Higham, Business Design Manager, Modernising Pay As You Earn, Telford, H.M. Revenue and Customs.
- Ms Stephanie Hilborne, Chief Executive, The Wildlife Trusts. For services to Nature Conservation.
- Professor Anthony Edward Hill, Director, National Oceanography Centre, Southampton. For services to Environmental Science.
- Professor William Stewart Hillis, Medical Adviser, Scottish Football Association. For services to Medicine and to Sport.
- Helen Jane, Mrs. Clegg-Hood, Headteacher, Shiremoor Primary School, Newcastle upon Tyne. For services to Education.
- Ms Katharine Sarah Julian Horner, lately Specialist Counsellor and Senior Analyst, Assessments Staff, Cabinet Office.
- Peter John Hosker. For services to the community in Preston, Lancashire.
- Gareth Dale Hoskins. For services to Architecture.
- Kevin Houston, Managing Director, Anderson Manning Associates. For services to Business.
- Nicholas Howard, Parliamentary Clerk, Prime Minister's Office.
- Susan, Mrs. Huggins, Head of Network Development. For services to the Post Office.
- Shirley, Mrs. Hughes, Chief Executive Officer, Cerebral Palsy Sport. For services to Disability Sport.
- Robert Alfred Hutchings. For services to the Voluntary Sector in Wales.
- William Anthony Hynett, Group Chief Executive Officer, B-N Group Ltd. For services to the Defence Industry.
- Paul Stafford Jackson. For services to the Computer Games Industry.
- Marc Jaffrey. For services to Music Education.
- Anthony Paul Jakimciw, Principal and Chief Executive Officer, Dumfries and Galloway College. For services to Further Education in Scotland.
- Professor Ian Miller Jamieson, lately Pro-Vice- Chancellor (Learning and Teaching), University of Bath. For services to local and national Education.
- Ms Marion Juliette Janner. For services to Mental Healthcare.
- Ms Deborah Jeffery, Grade B2, Ministry of Defence. Martin John Jenkins, Grade B1, Ministry of Defence.
- Jane, Mrs. Johnson, Headteacher, St. Stephen's Primary School, Newham, London. For services to Education.
- Glenys, Mrs. Johnston, Chair, Local Safeguarding Children Board, Leicestershire and Rutland. For services to Local Government.
- Paul Lloyd Jones, Executive Headteacher, Blackpool and Chudleigh Knighton Lady Seaward's and Salcombe Primary Schools, Devon. For services to local and national Education.
- Stephen Jones, Milliner. For services to the Fashion Industry.
- Professor Vijay Vir Kakkar, Emeritus Professor, University of London. For services to Clinical Science.
- Ms Jeanne Kaniuk, Head of Adoption Services, Thomas Coram Foundation for Children. For services to Children.
- Professor Paul Keane, Dean, School of Health and Social Care, Teesside University. For services to Healthcare.
- Anna, Mrs. Kendall, lately Headteacher, Christ Church Church of England Primary School, Kensington and Chelsea, London. For services to Education.
- Nigel Kershaw, Chief Executive, Big Issue Invest and Chairman, The Big Issue. For services to Social Enterprise.
- Simon Henry King. For services to Wildlife Photography and to Conservation.
- John Gordon Kingston. For services to the Voluntary Sector.
- Ms Anne Kirkham, Grade 5, Decent Homes and Housing Finance Division, Department for Communities and Local Government.
- Richard Philip Kitson, lately Chief Executive, Aster Group. For services to the Housing Sector.
- Susan, Mrs. Knox. For services to Food Safety.
- Silas Krendel. For charitable services.
- Ram Parkash Lakha. For services to the Sikh community in Coventry, West Midlands.
- Anthony Edward Langford, Non-Executive Director, John Smedley. For services to the Knitwear Industry.
- Heather, Mrs. Lawrence, Chief Executive, Chelsea and Westminster Hospital NHS Foundation Trust. For services to Healthcare.
- Jurat and Lieutenant Bailiff Sally Carolyn Ann Le Brocq. For services to the Administration of Justice and to the community in Jersey.
- Andrew John Leigh. For public service.
- Eva, Mrs. Loeffler, Vice-President, WheelPower. For services to Disability Sport.
- Helen, Mrs. MacKenzie, Headteacher, Shevington High School, Wigan. For services to Education.
- John Graham Marks. For charitable services.
- Victor Alan Marshall, Detective Superintendent, Sussex Police and Adviser to the Home Office. For services to the Police.
- Ms Wendy Martinson, Consultant Dietitian, British Olympic Association. For services to Sport and to Nutrition.
- June Colette, Mrs. Mason, Grade 7, Cohesion and Migration Directorate, Department for Communities and Local Government.
- Samuel Abraham McCrea, Principal, Ballyclare Secondary School. For services to Education in Northern Ireland.
- Professor John Alexander McDermid. For services to the Defence Industry.
- William John McGawley, Executive Vice-Chairman, TDR Group. For services to Business and to Skills Training in the North East.
- The Very Reverend Dr. Robert Samuel James Houston McKelvey, Q.V.R.M., T.D., Dean, St. Anne's Cathedral, Belfast. For services to the community in Northern Ireland.
- Ms Alison Mary McLean. For services to Rural Affairs in the West Midlands.
- Bishop Louis Richard McLeod, For services to Southwark Credit Union.
- Ronald McNab, lately Managing Director, Caledonian Alloys Ltd. For services to the Recycling Industry.
- Ms Loretta Minghella, Chief Executive, Financial Services Compensation Scheme. For services to the Financial Services Industry.
- Michelle, Mrs. Mone, Founder and Owner, MJM International Group. For services to the Lingerie Industry.
- Kenneth Montgomery, Principal Conductor, Ulster Orchestra. For services to Music in Northern Ireland.
- Ms Debbie Moore, Founder and Chair, Pineapple Dance Studios. For services to Business.
- Heidi, Mrs. Mottram, Managing Director, Northern Rail. For services to the Rail Industry.
- Ms Diane Mulligan. For services to disabled people and to Equal Opportunities.
- Braham Sydney Murray, Artistic Director, Royal Exchange, Manchester. For services to Drama.
- Peter Murray, Co-Founder, Ormiston Trust. For services to Children and Families.
- Dr. Sydney Donnelly Neill, Director, Agriculture Food and Environmental Sciences Division, Agri-Food and Biosciences Institute, Northern Ireland Executive.
- David Nixon, Artistic Director, Northern Ballet Theatre. For services to Dance.
- Edward James O'Gorman. For charitable services to the Foundation for Children with Leukaemia.
- Professor Timothy O'Riordan, D.L., Emeritus Professor of Environmental Sciences, University of East Anglia. For services to Sustainable Development.
- Gary Oldman. For public service.
- Dr. Jane Overbury, Principal, Christ the King Sixth Form College, Lewisham, London. For services to Education.
- Richard Parfitt, Co-Founder, Singer and Guitarist, Status Quo. For services to Music and to Charity.
- Dr. Louise Mary Perrotta. For public service.
- Peter Phillipson, Chairman, Merlin Entertainments Group. For services to the Leisure Industry.
- Raymond Pollock, Principal, Banbridge Academy. For services to Education in Northern Ireland.
- Diane, Mrs. Poole, General Manager, Passengers Norfolkline Irish Sea Ferry Services. For services to the Tourist Industry.
- Melloney, Mrs. Poole, Deputy Director, Legal Services and Governance, Big Lottery Fund. For public service.
- Andrew Richard Pope, J.P., National Business Crime Partnership Manager, Co-operative Group. For public service.
- Ms Rachel Portman, Film Composer. For services to Music.
- Colin Preece, lately Director, Social Services, Neath Port Talbot. For services to Local Government.
- Professor Michael Charles Prestwich, Emeritus Professor of History, Durham University. For services to Scholarship.
- Richard Edward Priest, Chief Executive, Riverside Centre. For services to the community in the Isle of Wight.
- Walter Rader, Director, Big Lottery Fund. For services to the community in Northern Ireland.
- Judith, Mrs. Ragan, Headteacher, Queensmill Special School for Autism, Hammersmith and Fulham, London. For services to Special Needs Education.
- Bernardine, Mrs. Rees, lately Chief Executive, Ceredigion and Pembrokeshire Local Health Board. For services to the NHS in Wales.
- Raymond Victor Refausse, lately Director and Chief Executive, South West College. For services to Further and Higher Education in Northern Ireland.
- Professor Margaret Reid, Professor of Women's Health, University of Glasgow. For services to Healthcare and to Higher Education.
- Ms Lyndy Reynolds, lately Deputy Head, Government Legal Service Secretariat, Treasury Solicitor's Department.
- Ms Menna Richards, Director, BBC Wales. For services to Broadcasting.
- Anne, Mrs. Roberts, Chief Executive, Crossroads Association. For services to Carers.
- Edmund Caerwyn Roberts, M.B.E., Chairman, Snowdonia National Park Authority. For services to the community in Gwynedd.
- Elizabeth Regina Oluyemika, Mrs. Atere-Roberts, Older People's Nurse Specialist. For services to Healthcare in London.
- Brian Keith Rockliffe, Director, Voluntary Service Overseas. For services to International Development.
- Francis Dominic Nicholas Michael Rossi, Co-Founder and Singer, Status Quo. For services to Music and to Charity.
- John Kenneth Rostill, Chief Executive, Worcestershire Acute Hospitals NHS Trust. For services to Healthcare.
- Henry James Griffin Russell, lately Chairman, National Association of General Commissioners. For public service.
- Professor Edward Sallis, Principal and Chief Executive, Highlands College, Jersey. For services to Education.
- Sujinder Singh Sangha, Principal, Stockton Riverside College, County Durham. For services to local and national Further Education.
- Professor Danny Saunders, Professor and Head of the Centre for Lifelong Learning, University of Glamorgan. For services to Higher Education in Wales.
- Professor Joseph Maurice Savage, Consultant Paediatric Nephrologist, Royal Belfast Hospital for Sick Children. For services to Medicine.
- Dr. Caroline Ann Bodley-Scott, Civilian Medical Practitioner, British Forces Germany Health Service, Ministry of Defence.
- Gordon Scott. For services to Regeneration in South Yorkshire.
- Jane Antoinette, Mrs. Scott, Leader, Wiltshire Council. For services to Local Government.
- Ahmad Shahzad. For services to Black and Minority Ethnic People.
- Ghulam Rasul Shahzad. For services to Social Housing and to the community in Rochdale.
- Peter Sheldon. For services to the Jewish Community.
- Miss Julie May Shenton, Departmental Strategic Business Continuity Manager, Department for Work and Pensions.
- Dr. David Sibbald, F.R.S.E., Chairman, Sumerian Networks. For charitable services in Scotland and Overseas.
- Alice, Mrs. Sluckin, Chair, Selective Mutism Information and Research Association. For services to Children and Families.
- Ronald Gordon King-Smith, Author. For services to Children's Literature.
- John Thomas Smith, lately Principal, Burnley College. For services to Further Education.
- Ms Laraine Smith, Principal, Uxbridge College. For services to Further Education.
- Peter Arthur Smith. For services to the Optometric Profession.
- Gerard Smyth. For services to the Police in the North East.
- Margaret, Mrs. Snowdon, Chair, Pensions Advisory Service. For services to Pensioners.
- The Honourable Rupert Christopher Soames, Chief Executive Officer, Aggreko plc. For services to the Power Industry.
- Pauline Joan, Mrs. Spencer, lately Head, Victim and Witness Care Delivery Unit, Crown Prosecution Service.
- Eric Spicer. For services to the Telecommunications Industry.
- The Right Reverend James Theophilus Stapleton. For services to Inter-Faith and Community Relations in Nottingham.
- Dr. Miriam Stoppard. For services to Healthcare and to Charity.
- Professor David Storey, lately Director, Centre for Small and Medium Enterprise, Warwick Business School. For services to Business.
- Stephen Szemerenyi, Pay and Conditions Specialist, Association of School and College Leaders. For services to Education.
- Alexander Tait, lately Governing Governor, H.M. Young Offenders' Institution Castington, Northumberland, H.M. Prison Service, Ministry of Justice.
- Jeremy James Taylor. For services to Young People and to Musical Theatre.
- David Ralph Thompson, Governor H.M. Prison Frankland, Durham, H.M. Prison Service, Ministry of Justice.
- Ms Gillian Jane Thompson, lately Chief Executive, Accountant in Bankruptcy, Scottish Executive.
- Cyrus Todiwala, M.B.E., Proprietor and Executive Chef, Cafe ́ Spice Namaste ́ Restaurant Group. For services to the Hospitality Industry.
- Iqbal Wahhab, Chairman, Department for Work and Pensions, Ethnic Minority Advisory Group. For public service and for services to the Hospitality Industry.
- Ms Amanda Jane Wakeley, Designer. For services to the Fashion Industry.
- Professor Janet Anne Walker, Deputy Chair, Social Security Advisory Committee. For public service.
- James Arneil Wardrop. For services to the community in Renfrewshire.
- Caroline, Mrs. Waters, Director, People and Policy for BT Group. For services to Diversity and to Equal Opportunities.
- Norma Anne, Mrs. Watson. For services to Education in Scotland.
- Dr. John Alexander Watt, Director of Strengthening Communities, Highlands and Islands Enterprise. For services to Community Development.
- Professor Maureen Wayman, lately Pro-Vice-Chancellor and Dean, Art and Design, Manchester Metropolitan University. For services to local and national Higher Education.
- John Wilkinson, Chief Executive, Ecuomed. For services to the Healthcare Industry.
- Mark Roger Wilkinson. For services to the Furniture Industry and to Charity.
- Susan Jean, Mrs. Willan, lately Inspector, Her Majesty's Inspectorate for Education and Training in Wales. For services to Education.
- Professor Richard James Willson Williams, T.D., Consultant Child and Adolescent Psychiatrist, Aneurin Bevan Health Board. For services to Medicine.
- Jessie, Mrs. Wojciechowski, Headteacher, Borestone Primary School, Stirling. For services to Education.
- Professor Charles Roland Wolf, Director, Biomedical Research Centre, University of Dundee. For services to Science.
- David Mark Wood, Chief Executive, ATTEND. For services to the Voluntary Sector.
- Dr. Eric Wood, D.L. For services to Education and to the community in Warwickshire.
- Thomas Greenaway Woods. For public service.
- Ms Louise Wright, Fraud and Error Consultant, Department for Work and Pensions.
- Stephen Frederick Wright, Head, Business, Improvement and Support Team, London, Valuation Office Agency, H.M. Revenue and Customs.
- Woon Wing Yip, Chairman, Wing Yip plc. For services to the Oriental Food Industry.

Diplomatic and Overseas List

- Mockbul Ali - Adviser to the then Foreign & Commonwealth Office. For services to British foreign policy.
- David Belgrove – lately Head, Counter Narcotics Team, British Embassy, Afghanistan.
- Thomas Yates Benyon – Founder and director, ZANE (Zimbabwe A National Emergency). For services to vulnerable people in Zimbabwe.
- James Gordon Davidson Blakely – Director Youth (Education, Science and Society), British Council.
- The Right Reverend Leroy Errol Brooks – For services to the community in Anguilla.
- Norma Po Yee Chan – lately Chief, Security Council Secretariat, United Nations. For services to the United Nations in New York.
- John Joseph-Devine, LVO – First Secretary, Foreign and Commonwealth Office.
- Dr. Roderic William Dutton – Adviser on the Middle East, International Office, Durham University. For services to higher education and research links between the UK and the Middle East, especially Jordan.
- Simon John Gillham – President, Franco-British Chamber of Commerce. For services to Franco-British business interests in France.
- Richard Wingfield Hyde, MBE – British Honorary Consul, Madagascar. For services to the British community in Madagascar.
- Graham King – Film Producer. For services to the British film industry in the US and UK.
- Beverley Elizabeth Lewis – First Secretary, Foreign and Commonwealth Office.
- Nicholas Roy Mason – First Secretary, Foreign and Commonwealth Office.
- Margaret Marian McPartland – Pianist and Radio Show Host, National Public Radio, USA. For services to jazz and to aspiring young musicians in the USA.
- Diane Mulligan – for services to disabled people and to equal opportunities.
- William Smith MacDonald Murray – Economic and Financial Attaché, British Embassy, Spain.
- Brian David Outlaw – Director, China-Britain Business Council. For services to British business interests in China.
- Mehr Tahir Kamran – British Foreign Officer, Ambassador to Russia. For services towards a better mutual co-ordination in trade with Russia.
- Ian George Purves – lately Stabilisation Adviser, Civil Military Mission in Helmand. For services to security and stabilisation in Afghanistan.
- Michael Charles Ramscar – First Secretary, Foreign and Commonwealth Office.
- Jane Antoinette Scott – For services to local government in Wiltshire.
- Olga May Scott – For services to the health, education and development of Bermuda's youth.
- Stephen Rowland Thomas – Founder and former Chairman of OPAL, Oman. For services to British business interests and to the community in Oman.
- Paul Williams – Offsets Adviser, UK Trade and Investment, South Africa. For services to British business interests.

==== Members of the Order of the British Empire (MBE) ====
Military Division

Royal Navy

- Warrant Officer Class 1 Warfare Specialist (Abovewater Warfare Tactical) Russell Graham Billings
- Logistician (Catering Services) Class 1 Rosemary Anne Brodrick
- Warrant Officer Class 1 Air Engineering Technician Kenneth Michael Davidson
- Warrant Officer Class 1 Barry Dawe
- Warrant Officer Class 1 Robert John Ewen
- Warrant Officer Class 1 Coxswain (Submarines) John Ronald Hendren
- Lieutenant Commander Steven David Hopkins
- Lieutenant Anthony Jackson
- Lieutenant Commander Bryan John Nicholas
- Chief Petty Officer Engineering Technician (Marine Engineering) David Parker
- Warrant Officer Class 1 Coxswain (Submarines) Andrew Mark Rainey
- Warrant Officer Class 1 Philip David Slocombe
- Lieutenant Commander Graham Gilbey Trewhella
- Warrant Officer Class 1 (Bugler) James Whitwham

Army

- Warrant Officer Class 2 Justin Mark Brooks – Corps of Royal Electrical and Mechanical Engineers
- Major Neil James Mark Budd – Royal Regiment of Artillery
- Major Richard Ronald Coomber – Corps of Royal Electrical and Mechanical Engineers
- Major Jonathan Edward Cunningham – The Yorkshire Regiment
- Major Robert Anthony Davies – The Duke of Lancaster's Regiment
- Major Mark Christopher Preston Ellwood – The Mercian Regiment
- Lieutenant Colonel Michael Richard Elviss – Royal Regiment of Artillery
- Major Graham Roy Emond – Devon Army Cadet Force
- Major Christopher Gill – Army Air Corps, Territorial Army
- Major Paul Harrison – Royal Regiment of Artillery
- Captain Philip John Hawkins – The Royal Logistic Corps
- Warrant Officer Class 1 Anthony Mark Hobbins – The Parachute Regiment
- Staff Sergeant Gary Holdham – Corps of Royal Electrical and Mechanical Engineers
- Warrant Officer Class 1 Charles Henry James Holdsworth – The Royal Logistic Corps
- Sergeant Barry John – The Royal Welsh
- Captain Susan King – Royal Corps of Signals
- Major Joanna Catherine Maynard – Royal Corps of Signals
- Captain Richard Andrew Peters – Corps of Royal Electrical and Mechanical Engineers
- Warrant Officer Class 2 Damien Daniel Place – The Royal Irish Regiment
- Warrant Officer Class 2 Iestyn David Plummer – The Parachute Regiment
- Major James Samuel Robert Priest – The Royal Logistic Corps
- Major Jonathan Howard Scott – Corps of Royal Engineers
- Major Jeremy Edward Gavin Sharpe – Royal Regiment of Artillery
- Warrant Officer Class 2 Paul Philip Shipley – Royal Regiment of Artillery
- Lieutenant Colonel Hugh Campbell-Smith – The Royal Dragoon Guards
- Major Oliver William Stokes – The Princess of Wales's Royal Regiment
- Major Sonya Adams Summersgill – The Royal Logistic Corps, Territorial Army
- Major Alasdair James Eli Truett – The Parachute Regiment
- Captain Thomas Georg John Tugendhat – Intelligence Corps, Territorial Army
- Lieutenant Colonel Colin Richard James Weir – The Royal Irish Regiment
- Major Robert John Wells – The Princess of Wales's Royal Regiment
- Major Christopher James White – Surrey Army Cadet Force
- Lieutenant Colonel John Wilson – Cumbria Army Cadet Force

Royal Air Force

- Warrant Officer Peter Allen Akers
- Chief Technician Paul Andrew Blackah
- Squadron Leader Ian Bryant
- Squadron Leader John Cairns
- Warrant Officer Alexander Michael Dykes
- Flight Sergeant Douglas Stuart Law
- Warrant Officer Rachel MacKenzie
- Flying Officer Leslie Edward Wall McCammont
- Sergeant Rodney Christian Munday
- Squadron Leader John Nelson
- Squadron Leader Gordon William Henry Parry
- Flight Sergeant Christopher Edward Read
- Warrant Officer Stephen Kenneth Roberts
- Squadron Leader Colin Terence Sullivan
- Senior Aircraftman Darren Mark Swift

Civil Division

- Gwendolen June, Mrs. Abraham. For services to the community in Braunstone, Leicestershire.
- Hemant Acharya, Policy Adviser, Office of the Third Sector, Cabinet Office.
- Samuel Adair, Director, Waterside Credit Union Ltd. For services to the Financial Services Industry in Northern Ireland.
- Valerie Edith, Mrs. Adams, Principal, Lisbellaw Primary School. For services to Education in Northern Ireland.
- Manus Blake Adamson, Chairman, Adamson Group and Executive Chairman, Construction Confederation. For services to the Construction Industry.
- Robin Agascar. For voluntary service to the Police in Gloucester.
- Matilda, Mrs. Akhigbe, Communications Officer, Local Compliance, London, H.M. Revenue and Customs.
- Ms Foluke Akinlose, Founder and Editor, Precious Online. For services to the Creative Industries.
- Gerald Akroyd. For voluntary service to Mountain Rescue in Scotland.
- Anthony John Alderman, Special Constable, Avon and Somerset Constabulary. For voluntary service to the Police.
- Ms Angela Cecile Alessendre, Founder, Alessendre Special Needs Dance School and the Larondina Dance Company. For services to Dance.
- Anne Maria Palma, Mrs. Allan, Deputy Head Teacher, inverclyde Academy, Greenock. For services to Education.
- Dr. Geoffrey Walter Allan. For services to the community in Kirkintilloch, Dunbartonshire.
- Shulah, Mrs. Allan, lately Director, Edinburgh Voluntary Organisations Council. For services to the Voluntary Sector.
- Lynda, Mrs. Allen, Chair of Governors, Sir John Deane's Sixth Form College, Northwich, Cheshire. For voluntary service to Education.
- Andrew Paul Andrews. For voluntary service to St. John Ambulance Brigade.
- John Charles Ankcorn, President, Birmingham Crisis Centre. For voluntary service to Victims of Domestic Violence.
- Linda Joyce, Mrs. Ansell. For charitable services in Southend-on-Sea, Essex.
- Miss Kerry Anthony, Chief Executive, DePaul Northern Ireland. For services to Social Housing.
- David Archbold. For services to the Water Industry in the North East.
- James Armitage. For services to the Royal Mail and to the community in the West Midlands.
- Carol, Mrs. Armstrong, Claims Receipts Manager, Benefits and Credits Operations, Washington, Tyne and Wear, H.M. Revenue and Customs.
- Mohammed Aslam, Executive Chef and Managing Director, Aagrah Group Restaurants. For services to the Hospitality Industry.
- Jean, Mrs. Atkinson, lately Staff Side Chair, UNISON, Mersey Care NHS Trust. For services to the NHS.
- Barbara May, Mrs. Austin. For services to the community in Lyme Regis, Dorset.
- Kenneth Edwin Ayers. For services to the City of London Corporation.
- Gloria, Mrs. Bailey. For services to the community in Lambeth, South London.
- Joan Debra, Mrs. Bailey. For services to Youth Justice in Luton, Bedfordshire.
- Sharon Gail, Mrs. Bailey, J.P., Head of Service Learning Disabilities, Birmingham City Council. For services to Local Government.
- Lilian, Mrs. Baker. For services to Mental Healthcare in the Wirral.
- Warner James Baker, Special Constable, Hampshire Constabulary. For voluntary service to the Police.
- Robert Henry Ball. For services to Young People in Exeter, Devon.
- Susan, Mrs. Banton, Director, Steps Charity Worldwide. For services to People with Skeletal Disabilities.
- Ramanbhai Barber. For services to the Asian community in Leicester.
- Grace, Mrs. Barnett. For services to the community in Failsworth, Oldham.
- Norman Barrett, Circus Ringmaster. For services to Entertainment.
- Derek Anthony Bartley. For services to the Midland Association of Mountaineering and to Rhyl Music Club, Denbighshire.
- Miss Luella Dayrell Bartley, Designer. For services to the Fashion Industry.
- Patricia, Mrs. Bate. For services to the community in Warrington, Cheshire.
- Thomas Frederick Beesley. For services to the community in Halewood, Liverpool.
- Antony Romer Beevor. For voluntary service to Fairbridge youth organisation.
- Gulrook, Mrs. Begum. For services to Disabled Bangladeshi People in Tower Hamlets, London.
- Stephen Avery Bell, Managing Director, Davy Roll Company. For services to Business in the North East.
- Mavis, Mrs. Bent. For voluntary service to Swimming and Water Polo in Greater Manchester.
- John Alfred Bigny. For services to Edenbridge and District Rail Travellers' Association Kent.
- Helen, Mrs. Bird. For services to the community in Hastings, East Sussex.
- Dr. Charles William Handley Bird, General Medical Practitioner and Strategic Health Adviser to Natural England. For services to Healthcare and to Physical Activity.
- Arthur Birkby. For services to the community in Runnymede, Surrey.
- Paul Blakey. For services to Community Safety in Halifax.
- Alan Blocksidge, Officer, H.M. Prison Manchester, H.M. Prison Service, Ministry of Justice.
- June, Mrs. Bloom. For services to the community in Treeton, South Yorkshire.
- Roy Bloom. For services to the community in Treeton, South Yorkshire.
- Elizabeth Ann, Mrs. Boswell. For services to the community in Sheerness, Kent.
- John Stephen Morton Bower. For services to the British Veterinary Association Animal Welfare Foundation.
- Miss Jennifer Boyd, Principal, Enniskillen Nursery School. For services to Education in Northern Ireland.
- Scott Michael Bradbury. For services to the community in Tamworth, Staffordshire.
- Barbara Evelyn Turner, Mrs. Braithwaite. For voluntary service to the community in Linlithgow, West Lothian.
- Rosa, Mrs. Branson, Painter. For services to Art and to Charity.
- Richard Oliver Brantingham, Grade C1, Ministry of Defence.
- David Keith Bray. For services to the community in Lincolnshire.
- Valerie, Mrs. Braybrooks, Dean and Associate Professor, Faculty of Agriculture, Food and Animal Sciences, University of Lincoln. For services to Education and to the Food Industry.
- John Frederick Brignall. For services to the community in the East Riding of Yorkshire.
- Philip Britton, Headmaster, Boys' Division, Bolton School. For services to Physics.
- Mary Elizabeth, Mrs. Bromley. For charitable services in Oswestry, Shropshire.
- Robert Patrick Brooks. For voluntary service to the Soldiers', Sailors', Airmen and Families Association in Clwyd.
- Felicity, Mrs. Brown, Foster Carer, Hampshire. For services to Children and Families.
- Ms Marie Therese Brown. For services to the Victims of Domestic Violence in Northern Ireland.
- Norman Henry Parson Brown. For voluntary service to the Royal British Legion in Hampshire.
- Robert Brown. For services to the community in Lower Bevendean, Brighton.
- David Buchanan. For voluntary service to the Environment and to Heritage in Northern Ireland.
- Diana Hill, Mrs. Bucknall. For voluntary service to the community in Dorset.
- Lieutenant Commander James Frederic Budgen, R.N.R. For voluntary service to the Sea Cadet Corps in Ruislip, London Borough of Hillingdon.
- Frederick Henry Ernest Buller. For services to Angling.
- Yvonne, Mrs. Burdge. For services to the Trust for Chernobyl Children.
- Kenneth Burgin. For voluntary service to the Casualties Union.
- Richard John Burningham, Manager, Devon and Cornwall Rail Partnership. For services to the Rail Industry in the South West.
- Dr. Stephen Brian Burns. For services to Healthcare and to the community in Rotherham, South Yorkshire.
- William Henry Burt. For voluntary service to Education in Bridgend, South Wales.
- David John Butler, Chairman, British Motorsport Association for the Disabled. For services to Disability Sport.
- Jenson Alexander Lyons Button. For services to Motorsport.
- Ian Caddy. For services to the community in Birtley, County Durham.
- Dr. Timothy Alan Carney, General Medical Practitioner, Hexham and Tynedale, Northumberland. For services to Healthcare.
- The Reverend Barry Edward Carter. For services to the community in Brockley, South East London.
- Colin Richard Carter. For services to the Road Haulage Industry and to Charity.
- Rosalind Ella, Mrs. Carter, EAL Education Adviser, Language Service, London Borough of Hounslow. For services to Education.
- Dr. Susan Carver, Senior Programme Manager, Arts and Humanities Research Council. For services to the Research Councils.
- Wing Commander Alan Charles Cassidy RAF (Ret'd). For services to Aerobatics and to Charity.
- Robin William Castle. For voluntary service to the Royal National Lifeboat Institution, Sheerness, Kent.
- Judith Evelyn, Mrs. Catterick. For services to Music in Ashwell, Hertfordshire.
- James Joseph Caulfield. For voluntary service to Disadvantaged People in Kenya.
- Miss Susan Caulfield, Assistant Director, Immigration Fingerprint Bureau, UK Border Agency, Home Office.
- Peter Geoffrey Challinor, Curator and Manager, Anson Engine Museum. For services to Industrial Heritage.
- Harry Chambers. For services to Poetry.
- Patricia, Mrs. Chapman. For services to Young People and to the community in Ealing, West London.
- Glendon Austin Chappelle, Project Manager, Global Combat Systems—Munitions, BAE Systems. For services to the Defence Industry and to Industrial Heritage.
- Deborah Ann, Mrs. Chedgey. For services to Disadvantaged People in Norwich, Norfolk.
- Rex Chester. For services to Young People through the Explore Charity.
- Ms Lauren Child, Author and Illustrator. For services to Literature.
- Stanley Charles Church. For voluntary service to Conservation in Essex.
- Donna, Mrs. Clark, Assistant Practitioner, Podiatry Service, Sefton Primary Care Trust. For services to Healthcare.
- Leonard Durbin Clark. For services to Young People in Westminster and to the community in North West London.
- Peter Mansfield-Clark, Director, Crawley Open House. For services to Disadvantaged People in West Sussex.
- Dr. Janet Ruth Clarke, Chair, Central Committee for Community and Public Health Dentistry, British Dental Association. For services to Healthcare.
- Susan, Mrs. Clarke. For voluntary service to Disability Swimming in Stockton-on-Tees.
- Dr. Peter David Clarkson, Emeritus Associate, Scott Polar Research Institute. For services to Science.
- Professor Timothy Charles Claypole, Director, Welsh Centre for Printing and Coating, Swansea University. For services to Graphic Arts Research.
- Barry Clewer. For voluntary service to Birmingham Advisory Council of Older People.
- Oliver Charles Collyer, Co Founder, Sports Interactive. For services to Computer Games Industry.
- Paul Edward Collyer, Co Founder, Sports Interactive. For services to the Computer Game Industry.
- David Constantine, Co-Founder and Executive Officer Motivation. For services to disabled people.
- Teresa Mary, Mrs. Copp, Higher Executive Officer, Jobcentre Plus, Department for Work and Pensions.
- David John Couch. For charitable services in Fife.
- Thelma Selina, Mrs. Couch. For charitable services in Fife.
- Ms Margaret Joan Coulter. For services to Social Care in Northern Ireland.
- The Reverend Dr. Robert James Coulter, Member, Northern Ireland Assembly Commission. For public service.
- David Robert Coulthard, Senior Technician, University of York. For services to Science Communication.
- Beryl, Mrs. Cox, Administrator, Children and Family Court Advisory and Support Service, York. For services to the Administration of Justice.
- Theresa, Mrs. Coyle. For voluntary service to the community in Islington, London.
- Dorothy Dawn, Mrs. Cragg, Medical Tattooist. For services to Healthcare.
- Heather, Mrs. Crawford. For services to Speech and Language Therapy in Northern Ireland.
- Arthur Graves Credland. For services to Maritime History.
- Margaret, Mrs. Crennell, Senior Assistant Headteacher and Head of Learning Support Faculty, Marriotts School, Stevenage. For services to Special Needs Education.
- Ms Heather Alice Crouch, Chair, Netball South West. For voluntary service to Sport.
- John Cunningham. For charitable services in County Durham.
- Gordon Curry. For public service.
- Leonard James Curtis. For services to the community in Lancashire.
- Ms Nicola Kim Dale, Chief Inspector, Metropolitan Police Service. For services to the Police.
- David Dallison. For public service.
- Ashish Dasgupta, Non-Executive Director, Cambridgeshire and Peterborough NHS Foundation Trust. For services to Healthcare.
- John Kenneth Davies. For charitable services in Rochdale.
- Patricia Ann, Mrs. Davies. For voluntary service to Young People in Brownhills, Walsall, West Midlands.
- Sandra Irwin, Mrs. Davies. For services to the community in Craven Arms, Shropshire.
- Vanessa Marion, Mrs. Davies, Physiotherapist, Artificial Limb and Appliance Centre, Morriston Hospital, Swansea. For services to Healthcare.
- Barbara Jane, Mrs. Davis. For services to Young People in Buckinghamshire.
- Ian Davis. For services to the House of Commons.
- Eric George Dawkins. For services to the community in Penryn and Falmouth, Cornwall.
- Terence Day, Foster Carer, Bedfordshire. For services to Children and Families.
- Victoria, Mrs. Day, Foster Carer, Bedfordshire. For services to Children and Families.
- Ms Ilene Daisy Ming-Deans. For services to Clapham Youth Centre, Lambeth, London.
- Sister Lynda Dearlove. For services to Vulnerable Women.
- Sarinder Kaur, Mrs. Dev, Constable, South Yorkshire Police. For services to the Police.
- Achhar Paul Dharni. For services to Business and to the community in Bradford, West Yorkshire.
- Gwyneth Muriel, Mrs. Dickinson, President, Macular Disease Society. For services to Visually Impaired People.
- Valerie Anne, Mrs. Dilcock. For services to the North York Moors National Park Authority.
- Ronald Dodd, Chairman, Training and Development Resource Ltd, Tyneside. For services to Skills.
- Ian Henry Donaghey. For services to Regeneration in Coleraine, Northern Ireland.
- Mary Maya, Mrs. Donelan. For services to the community in Hammersmith and Fulham, London.
- Ms Norah Donnelly. For public service.
- Jennifer, Mrs. Doolan. Harpist. For services to Music.
- Muriel Margaret, Mrs. Douglas, Manager, Scottish NHS Central Register, General Register Office for Scotland, Scottish Executive.
- Dr. Andrew Frank Dove. For services to St. John Ambulance Brigade in Nottinghamshire.
- Carol Ann, Mrs. Downes, Divisional Officer, Derbyshire Special Constabulary. For voluntary service to the Police.
- Ray Downey. For charitable services to Sunderland Kidney Patient Group.
- John Ernest Drake, lately Chief Executive, YMCA Norfolk. For services to Young People.
- Alan Gordon Drinkall. For services to the community In North Yorkshire.
- Councillor Elizabeth Ann Ducker, Leader, South Oxfordshire District Council. For services to Local Government.
- David John Duke, Principal Technician, Department of Materials Science and Metallurgy, University of Cambridge. For services to Science.
- Karen, Mrs. Duncan, Senior Executive Officer, Student Finance Policy, Department for Business, Innovation and Skills.
- William Duncan. For services to Horticulture in Scotland.
- Miss Elizabeth Dunlop. For services to the Voluntary Sector in Scotland.
- Terrance Dunne. For voluntary service to St. Andrew's Hospice, Airdrie, Lanarkshire.
- Elizabeth, Mrs. Dupres. For services to St. Cuthbert's Catholic Primary School, Egham, Surrey.
- Sheila, Mrs. Eaglefield. For charitable services in Derbyshire.
- Eric James Eames. For services to the community in Birmingham.
- Ewan Easton. For voluntary service to H.M. Young Offenders' Institution, Thorn Cross, Warrington, Cheshire.
- The Reverend Mark Antony Edwards. For services to the Voluntary Sector in the North East.
- Gillian, Mrs. Elkins. For services to the community in Clacton-on-Sea, Essex.
- Miss Susan Ellis, lately Principal Officer, South East Area, National Offender Management Service, Ministry of Justice.
- Miss Cathryn Ellsmore, Grade C1, Ministry of Defence. Dr. John Richard England. For services to Retail Planning.
- Eileen, Mrs. Entwistle. For services to Local Government and to the community in Darwen and Blackburn, Lancashire.
- Geraint Evans. For voluntary service to Education in the Vale of Glamorgan.
- Sheila, Mrs. Evans, lately Administrative Officer, Jobcentre Plus, Department for Work and Pensions.
- Thomas Eurfyl Evans, Councillor, Ceredigion County Council. For services to Local Government in West Wales.
- Timothy Everest, Tailor. For services to the Fashion Industry.
- Margaret, Mrs. Fairbrother, Senior Probation Officer, Sussex Probation Area. For services to the Administration of Justice.
- Kelly, Mrs. Fairman. For services to the Fire and Rescue Service.
- Donald Fava, lately Business and Performance Reporting Manager, Finance and Operations Directorate, Department of Health.
- Janis Elizabeth, Mrs. Feely, Founder and Project Director, Living Room, Stevenage, Hertfordshire. For services to Disadvantaged People.
- Ms Ann Ferguson. For services to Older People in Scotland.
- Ms Margaret Hilary Ferriman, Chair, Banbury District Racial Equality Council. For services to Community Relations.
- Ms Deirdre Figueiredo, Director of Craftspace. For services to the Visual Arts in the West Midlands.
- Lyndon Filer, Chief Executive, Police Rehabilitation Centre, Goring-on-Thames. For services to the Police.
- Michael Peter Findley. For charitable services in Redcar, Cleveland.
- Dr. Doreen Elizabeth Finneron. For services to Inter-Faith Relations.
- Peggy Rita, Mrs. Finnie. For services to the community in Aberdeen.
- Peter James Fisher, Policy Adviser, Office of the Judge Advocate-General, Ministry of Justice.
- Ms Honor Wilson-Fletcher, lately Director, National Year of Reading. For services to Education.
- Anthony Fowler. For services to the community in Melton Mowbray, Leicestershire.
- Dereck Fowles, lately Chairman, Forth Valley and Lomond Local Action Group. For services to Rural Communities in Scotland.
- Kathleen, Mrs. Fox. For voluntary service to Deeside Community Hospital League of Friends, North Wales.
- Jennifer Lesley, Mrs. Foxon, Senior Technician, Department of Genetics, University of Leicester. For services to Science.
- David Victor Freeborn. For services to the Patterdale Mountain Rescue Team in the Lake District.
- Peter French, Deputy Chairman, London Board of Crimestoppers. For services to the Police.
- Timothy Enis French. For services to the community in Haywards Heath, West Sussex.
- Pino Frumiento, Singer and Songwriter, Heart n Soul. For services to Disability Arts.
- Dr. Ian David Robert Fry, Director, Partnership Pathology, Frimley Park Hospital NHS Trust. For services to Healthcare in the South East.
- Michael Fuller. For services to the NHS and to the Unite Trade Union in Scotland.
- Richard Gagan, Grade C1, Ministry of Defence.
- Irene Lorraine, Mrs. Galloway, lately Caseworker, Customer Operation, Lisburn, H.M. Revenue and Customs.
- Sarah Elizabeth, Mrs. Gamble. For services to the community in County Antrim.
- Stuart Mitchell Gay, J.P. For services to the community in Lancashire and Overseas.
- Mary Helen, Mrs. George, Catering Supervisor, Crossroads Primary School, Keith. For services to Education.
- Asquith Gibbes. For voluntary service to the Police in South East London.
- Henry Atherton Derek Gibson. For services to the community in Bridgwater, Somerset.
- Mary, Mrs. Gibson. For services to Education and to the community in North London.
- Robert Stewart Gibson, Officer, H.M. Prison Gartree, Leicestershire, H.M. Prison Service, Ministry of Justice.
- Margaret Helen, Mrs. Gilbert. For services to Older People in County Tyrone.
- Atma Singh Gill. For services to the community in the North East.
- Joy, Mrs. Gillies. For voluntary service to the Children's Panel in Scotland.
- Bernard John Godding. For voluntary service to Adult Learning and the Educational Centres Association.
- Alan John Godfrey, Publisher of Historic Ordnance Survey Maps. For services to Heritage.
- Professor Michael Goodfellow, Chairman of Governors, Gosforth High School, Newcastle upon Tyne. For voluntary service to Education.
- Sheila, Mrs. Gow. For services to Regional Journalism.
- Ms Agnes Graham. For services to the Soldiers', Sailors', Airmen and Families Association in Western Scotland.
- Dr. Maria Jadwiga Dlugolecka-Graham. For services to Polish-Scottish Relations and to Medicine.
- Robert Oliver David Graham, lately Grade C1, Ministry of Defence.
- Barbara, Mrs. Grant, Clinical Nurse Manager, NHS Fife. For services to Ophthalmology.
- Clemency Anne Rose, Mrs. Gray, Co-Founder, River Cafe ́. For services to the Hospitality Industry.
- William Gray. For services to Diversity and to Disability Training in Scotland.
- Angela Margaret, Mrs. Green. For charitable services Overseas and in Malvern, Worcestershire.
- Charles Anthony Green. For voluntary service to Industrial Heritage in the Staffordshire Potteries.
- Susan, Mrs. Greenwood, Specialist Community Public Health Nurse, Cornwall and Isles of Scilly. For services to Healthcare.
- David Grey, Group Managing Director, OSL Group Holdings Ltd. For services to Business and to Regeneration in Sheffield.
- Pauline, Mrs. Grice, Chief Executive, South Yorkshire Community Foundation. For services to Flood Relief.
- Joan, Mrs. Griffiths. For services to People with Learning Disabilities in Scotland.
- Mary Beatrice, Mrs. Guest. For services to People with Sensory Impairment.
- Mavis Ann, Mrs. Gunning. For voluntary service to Victims of Sexual Assault.
- Gordon William Guthrie. For services to Derby County Football Club.
- Ms Anna-Marie Hale (Mrs. Byrne), Matron, Division One Trauma and Orthopaedics, Selly Oak Hospital, Birmingham. For services to Healthcare.
- Colonel Alan Edmund Hall, T.D., D.L. For services to the community in the London Borough of Redbridge.
- Iain Murray Halliday. For services to the Arts in Perth.
- David Halpin. For services to disabled people in the North West.
- Pauline Jane, Mrs. Handy, Clinical Lead Nurse, Genito-Urinary Medicine, Newcastle General Hospital. For services to Healthcare.
- Frank Hannah, President, Manchester County Football Association. For services to Sport.
- Ms Belinda Harding, Constable, City of London Police. For services to the Police.
- Gillian Carol, Mrs. Hardy, Higher Executive Officer, Jobcentre Plus, Department for Work and Pensions.
- Terence Harris. For services to Music.
- Ms Karen Harrison, Head, Business Crime Preventions Team, Wakefield Partnership. For services to the Police.
- Peter Brantford Hartland. For services to the community in Ashton Keynes, Swindon, Wiltshire.
- Colin Hartley. For services to the community in Halifax, West Yorkshire.
- Faith Ingrid Evelyn, Mrs. Harvey. For voluntary service to the Royal National Lifeboat Institution, Cheltenham, Gloucestershire.
- Ms Susan Harvey. For services to Orienteering and to the community in Doune and Deanston, Perth and Kinross.
- Margaret Lynne, Mrs. Harwood, Executive Officer, Pension, Disability and Carers' Service, Department for Work and Pensions.
- Margaret Vine, Mrs. Haugh, Adviser for Creative and Expressive Studies, Southern Education and Library Board. For services to Education in Northern Ireland.
- Jean, Mrs. Hayley. Foster Carer. For services to Children and Families in Northern Ireland.
- Rodney James Hayley, Foster Carer. For services to Children and Families in Northern Ireland.
- Lewis Charles Haywood. For services to the Energy Learning Centre, Elliot Durham School, Nottingham.
- Professor John William Stanley Hearle. For services to Archaeology in Mellor, Stockport, Greater Manchester.
- Jean, Mrs. Heath. For services to Chadlington Primary School, Oxfordshire.
- Roberta, Mrs. Heavens. For services to the Tourism Industry.
- Jean Marion Anne, Mrs. Hedley. For voluntary service to Nature Conservation in Hampshire and the Isle of Wight.
- Elizabeth Ann, Mrs. Heeley. For voluntary service to Somerset Rural Life Museum.
- Ms Anna Hemmings, Canoeist. For services to Sport.
- John Graham Hemmings, Chairman, Blurton Ladsandads, Stoke-on-Trent. For services to Grass Roots Football.
- John Patrick Hennigan, Superintendent, British Transport Police. For services to the Police.
- Miss Sylvia Jean Herbert, Chaplain, H.M. Prison Leicester. For services to Prisoners.
- John Coleman Hick, Vice-President, British Holiday and Home Parks Association. For services to the Tourist Industry.
- Major Antony Stanley Hill. For services to Military Heritage in Essex.
- Lyn Joy, Mrs. Hill, Band 5, Health and Safety Executive, Department for Work and Pensions.
- Richard Wendle Hill, Branch Manager, Ulster Bank. For services to the Financial Services Industry.
- Margaret, Mrs. Hillman. For services to Girlguiding Cymru and to the Community of Hope.
- Christopher Hilton, lately General Manager, Odeon Leicester Square Cinema. For services to the Film Industry.
- Barry Hitchcock, Director of Sport, University of Surrey. For services to Sport and to Higher Education.
- Raymond Hodgkinson, Director-General, British Healthcare Trades Association. For services to the Healthcare Industry.
- Linda Mary, Mrs. Hoggarth. For services to disabled people in Suffolk.
- Ms Jean Florence Holder. For voluntary service to the Women's Library.
- Miss Rhiannon Sarah Holder. For services to Young People's Healthcare.
- Valerie Lois, Mrs. Holt. For services to Fisheries Management and to Conservation.
- Lady Lavinia Caroline Douglas-Home, D.L. For voluntary service to the British Red Cross and Macmillan Cancer Support in the Scottish Borders.
- Michael John Hopper, lately Higher Executive Officer, Jobcentre Plus, Department for Work and Pensions.
- Douglas Horrill. For voluntary service to Age Concern, New Forest East, Hampshire.
- Doreen Grace, Mrs. Hosey. For services to the community in Fawley, Southampton.
- Ms Rebecca Ann Hosking. For services to the Environment in Modbury, Dorset.
- Donna Maria, Mrs. Hough, Dental Workforce Development Lead for Dental Care Professionals, North Western and Mersey Postgraduate Deaneries. For services to Healthcare.
- Edward Howes. For services to the community in Prestatyn and Rhyl, Denbighshire.
- Winifred, Mrs. Howes. For services to the community in Prestatyn and Rhyl, Denbighshire.
- Ms Sheila Hudson. For services to Disadvantaged Young People in Hartlepool.
- Joe Human. For services to Oxfam and to Fair Trade in Cumbria.
- Brenda, Mrs. Hunt. For services to Older People in East Manchester.
- Carl Peter Hunt, Watch Manager, Humberside Fire and Rescue Service. For services to Local Government.
- Alderman Edna, Lady Hunter. For services to the community in County Durham.
- The Reverend Canon Michael Oram Hunter. For services to the Church of England and to the community in Grimsby.
- Professor John Margarson Huthnance, Deputy Director, Proudman Oceanographic Laboratory. For services to Marine Science.
- Dr. Thomas George Hyde. For services to the community in Repton, Derbyshire.
- Brian Ibell, lately Assistant Chief Executive, Derby Hospitals NHS Foundation Trust. For services to Healthcare.
- Andrew Ingram, Executive Officer, Output Services Group, Driver and Vehicle Licensing Agency, Swansea, Department for Transport.
- Peter David John Ingram. For services to Paper Making Industrial Heritage.
- James John Jack. For services to Children and Young People at Kibble Education and Care Centre.
- Mona, Mrs. Jack. For services to the community in Dumfries.
- Florence, Mrs. Jackson. For voluntary service to Hatton Hill Primary School, Sefton, Merseyside.
- Valerie, Mrs. Jackson, Founder and Principal, Stage 84. For services to the Performing Arts in the North.
- Valerie Hazel, Mrs. Jackson. For services to the community in Newcastle Emlyn, Carmarthenshire.
- John Alexander Jameson. For services to cricket.
- Waltraud Anna Luise, Mrs. Jarrold. For services to the community in Norwich.
- Susan Kay, Mrs. Jay, Area Manager, West Suffolk MIND. For services to Mental Healthcare.
- Helen Adair, Mrs. Jenkins. For services to the community in Durrington, Wiltshire.
- Kathleen, Mrs. Jenkins, Senior Case Adviser, Freedom of Information Team, H.M. Treasury.
- Sidney Johnson. For services to the community in Helston, Cornwall.
- John Johnstone, Administrative Officer, Child Support Agency, Department for Work and Pensions.
- Henry Jones, Project Manager, ISIS Second Target Station, Rutherford Appleton Laboratory, Oxfordshire. For services to Science.
- Jane Eryl, Mrs. Jones, lately Senior Nurse, Eryri Hospital, Caernarfon. For services to Healthcare for Older People.
- Penelope, Mrs. Jones, Foster Carer, Surrey. For services to Children and Families.
- Ronald Jones, Foster Carer, Surrey. For services to Children and Families.
- Charles Ernest Jukes. For services to the community in Dursley, Gloucestershire.
- Ms Maureen Kavanagh, Messenger, Department for Environment, Food and Rural Affairs.
- Elizabeth, Mrs. Kay, Co-Founder and Project Leader, Bolton University of the Third Age. For voluntary service to Adult Education.
- Bernard John Keay, Chairman, Health and Social Security Recreational Association, Department for Work and Pensions.
- Virginia Anne Pickering, Mrs. Keen. For services to the community in Wiltshire.
- Victor Walter Keene. For services to the community in Coventry.
- William Ernest James Kelley. For voluntary service to the RAF Halton Apprentices' Association.
- Patricia Alexandra, Mrs. Kelly. Foster Carer, Cornwall. For services to Children and Families.
- Graham Kennedy. For charitable services to People with Friedreich's ataxia.
- Miss Linda Margaret Kennedy, Manager, Banqueting House, Whitehall. For services to the Hospitality Industry.
- Anne, Mrs. Kenyon, Administrative Officer, Pension, Disability and Carers' Service, Department for Work and Pensions.
- Hilary, Mrs. Kerr. For services to Children and Young People with Special Needs in Warrington, Cheshire.
- Dr. David John Kerridge, Head of Science, Earth Hazards and Earth Systems Science, British Geological Survey. For services to Geophysics.
- Ms Imtaz Khaliq, Designer and Master Tailor. For services to the Fashion Industry.
- Ms Shahda Khan, Principal Community Cohesion Officer, Middlesbrough Council. For services to Local Government and to Diversity.
- Ms Catherine Isabel Audrey Kidston, Founder and Creative Director, Cath Kidston. For services to Business.
- Patrick Kieran, Senior Design Engineer. For services to Science.
- Anne Elizabeth, Mrs. King, Director, Building Services Research and Information Association. For services to Industry.
- Debra Ann, Mrs. King, Chair, Thornhill New Deal for Communities. For services to the community in Southampton, Hampshire.
- Jacqueline, Mrs. Upton-King, Chair, Management Team, SturQuest Community Partnership. For services to the community in Sturminster Newton, Dorset.
- Brenda Patricia, Mrs. Kirby. For services to the community in Croydon.
- Ms Marjorie Kirk. For voluntary service to H.M. Prison Nottingham.
- Elizabeth Ann, Mrs. Kirkwood. For services to the Soldiers', Sailors', Airmen and Families Association in Northern Ireland.
- Ms Anna Kucewicz (Mrs. Lee-Potter). For voluntary service to the Polish Scouting Association, Girl Scouts Division (UK).
- Paul Lambert, Chairman, Derbyshire Family Association. For services to Maritime Safety.
- John Lewis George Lamotte. For voluntary service to Animal Welfare in Scotland.
- Gabriel Lancaster. For services to the community in Medway, Kent.
- Miss Irene Langlands. For services to Dance in Central Scotland.
- Huw John Launder, Senior Executive Officer, Pension, Disability and Carers' Service, Department for Work and Pensions.
- Derek Law, Corporate Director, Adult and Community Services, North Yorkshire County Council. For services to Local Government.
- Ronald Lawrence. For services to the Police and to the community in Nottinghamshire.
- Miss Kathleen Lawrenson, Diagnostic Audiologist, St. Helens and Knowsley Hospitals NHS Trust. For services to Healthcare.
- Sheila Irene, Mrs. Layton, Founder, Contessa Riding Centre, Hertfordshire. For services to Equestrian Sport.
- Margaret, Mrs. Lee, Chief Executive, Cresco Trust. For services to Social Enterprise in Northern Ireland.
- Bryan Lewin, lately Head of Trading Standards, Northamptonshire County Council. For services to Consumers and to Business.
- Miss Judith Anne Lewis. For services to the Environment in the North East.
- Councillor Leonard Lewis. For services to Local Government and to the community in Caerphilly, South Wales.
- Neil Lewis. For services to Industrial Heritage and to the community in Blaenavon, Torfaen.
- David Robin Littlewood. For voluntary service to Athletics.
- Dr. Stephen Nicholas Liversedge, General Medical Practitioner, Bolton. For services to Healthcare.
- Wesley Courtney Livingstone, President, Newry Musical and Orchestral Society. For services to Music and to the community in County Down.
- Mary Constance, Mrs. Lloyd. For services to the community in Rutland.
- Pauline, Mrs. Lockett. For services to the community of Ackworth, West Yorkshire.
- Arthur Clifford Lockyear. For services to the community in Sunderland.
- Ian Douglas Loe, Wildlife Stamp Designer. For services to Art.
- Jeffrey Long. For voluntary service to the Royal British Legion.
- Ronald Hedley Longford, Chiropractor and Physiotherapist. For services to Animal Welfare.
- Carmel, Mrs. Lyddall, Executive Assistant, Local Government and Regional Policy Team, Department of Health.
- Alexander McKay Lynch. Group Finance Director, David MacBrayne Ltd, Gourock. For services to Transport and Charity in Scotland.
- Ms Ann MacKay, Policy Adviser, English Community Care Association. For services to Social Care.
- Professor Margaret MacLean, Professor of Pulmonary Pharmacology. For services to Science.
- Geraldine, Mrs. MacPhee, Principal Teacher in Home Economics, Clyde Valley High School. For services to Education and to the community in North Lanarkshire.
- Sydney Mair. For services to Local Government and to the community in Macduff, Aberdeenshire.
- Jean Isabella, Mrs. Malkin. For services to Young People in the Cartmel Peninsula, Cumbria.
- Edna, Mrs. March. For services to the community in Crook, County Durham.
- Kenneth Marsh, Constable, Metropolitan Police Service. For services to the Police and to Boxing in the London Borough of Haringey.
- Michael Thomas Martin. For services to the Voluntary Sector in Reading, Berkshire.
- Stuart Andrew Martin. For services to the community in Ripon, North Yorkshire.
- William Martin, Chairman, H. and J. Martin Ltd. For services to the Construction Industry in Northern Ireland.
- Philip Mason. For services to disabled people in Hampshire.
- Ms Valerie Mason (Mrs. Hendry). For services to the British Heart Foundation.
- Hilary, Mrs. Massarella. For voluntary service to Disadvantaged Young People in South Yorkshire.
- George Lewis Mathias. For services to Agriculture.
- Catriona, Mrs. Matthew. For services to Golf.
- Edwin Alexander Maxwell. For services to the New Art Exchange and to the community in Nottingham.
- Denise Jane, Mrs. May, Director of Sport and Assistant Headteacher, Budehaven Community School, Cornwall. For services to Education.
- Leslie Holden McAdoo, Chairman, Ballyclare Committee, Macmillan Cancer Support. For charitable services in Northern Ireland.
- Margaret Mary, Mrs. McCluskie, Manager, Major Investigation Team, Identity and Passport Service, Home Office.
- William McCrory. For services to Children with Cancer in Northern Ireland.
- Helen Muir, Mrs. McDonald. For services to the community in Crieff, Perthshire.
- Ken McElroy. For services to the Tourist Industry in Northern Ireland.
- Jean, Mrs. McEwen. For services to the community in Norwich.
- Peter McFall, Janitor, St. Peter 's Primary School, Dumbarton, West Dunbartonshire. For services to Education.
- Dr. David Douglas Murray McGavin, Ophthalmologist. For services to Eye Care in Developing Countries.
- Andrew Fraser McKay, Detective Superintendent, Strathclyde Police Force. For services to the Police.
- Ms Annie McKean, Senior Lecturer in Drama, University of Winchester. For services to Higher Education.
- Fiona Mary, Mrs. McLean, Grade C2, Ministry of Defence.
- Terrence McLernon. For services to Table Tennis and to the community in Drumchapel, Glasgow.
- Ms Melanie Justine McLoughlin. For services to the Devon Community Foundation.
- Ivan Lewis McMichael. For services to Journalism in Northern Ireland.
- Dr. Mary Brigeen McNee, General Medical Practitioner, Glasgow. For voluntary service to Cancer Research and to Healthcare in Lourdes.
- Alexander Ian McNeill, Administration Officer, Customer Operations, Thornaby, Cleveland, H.M. Revenue and Customs.
- Marian, Mrs. McNeir. For services to the community In Bath.
- Marjory, Mrs. McQueen. For services to the community In Lockerbie, Dumfries and Galloway.
- Dr. Noel Henri Joseph Meeke. For voluntary service to Herefordshire Waterworks Museum.
- David Melrose, Chairman, Scottish Prison Officers' Association, Scottish Executive.
- Jean, Mrs. Messenger. For services to the After School Club, Bude, Cornwall.
- Faruk Miah, Programme Manager, Leeds City College. For services to Further Education and to the community in Leeds.
- Moira Sheelagh, Mrs. Michelmore. For services to the community in Sidmouth, Devon.
- Elizabeth, Mrs. Milburn, Chair, West Suffolk College Corporation. For services to Further Education and to the community in Suffolk.
- Frederick Roy Millar, Director of Coaching, Irish Football Association. For services to Youth Football in Northern Ireland.
- Ian Duncan Millar. For services to Agriculture in Scotland.
- Patrick Millard. For services to the charity Taxhelp for Older People.
- Katherine, Mrs. Miller, Administrative Officer, Child Support Agency, Department for Work and Pensions.
- Marcia Anne, Mrs. Miller. For voluntary service to the British Red Cross Society in Cambridgeshire.
- Gerald David Mills. For services to School Sport in Nottinghamshire.
- Laura, Mrs. Mitchell, Consultant Orthodontist and Clinical Lead, St Luke's Hospital Bradford Teaching Hospitals NHS Foundation Trust. For services to Healthcare.
- Nasrullah Khan Moghal. For services to Community Relations in Manchester.
- Michael Monaghan. For charitable services to Ex- Service Men and Women.
- Elizabeth, Mrs. Montgomery. For charitable services in Northern Ireland and Overseas.
- Roger Ivan Moore. For services to the community in Potters Bar, Hertfordshire.
- Christopher Morgan, Security Manager, Aberafan Shopping Centre. For services to the community in Neath Port Talbot.
- Daphne, Mrs. Morgan. For voluntary service to Hertfordshire Constabulary and to Feltham Young Offenders' Institution.
- John Francis Morgan. For voluntary service to the Royal National Lifeboat Institution, Newcastle, County Down.
- Alderman Peter James Morgan. For services to the community in Sittingbourne, Kent.
- Heather Dalton, Mrs. Morris, School Crossing Warden, Sale, Cheshire. For services to Education.
- Helen Elizabeth, Mrs. Morris. Crown Advocate, Merseyside and Cheshire Group, Crown Prosecution Service.
- John Harold Morris. For services to the Post Office.
- Thomas Geraint Morris. For services to the NHS and to the community in Dersingham, Norfolk.
- Nigel Peter Morse, Grade C1, Ministry of Defence.
- Keith Hedley Moss, President, Bradford Cricket League and Pudsey St. Lawrence Cricket Club. For voluntary service to Sport.
- Maureen Anne, Mrs. Muckle, Chair, Batchley First School, Redditch. For services to Education and to the community in North Worcestershire.
- Maurice Harrison Murphy. Trumpeter. For services to Music.
- Janice Elizabeth, Mrs. Naylor. For services to Swimming.
- Peter David Needham, Grade B2, Ministry of Defence.
- Terence Charles Nelson, Security Officer, Leeds City College. For services to Further Education.
- Harold Newman. For services to the community in Mill Hill, London.
- Gilda, Mrs. Newsham. For voluntary service to the Alzheimer's Society, New Forest, Hampshire.
- Fionnuala Eileen, Mrs. Newton, Executive Administrative Assistant, Queen's University Belfast. For services to Higher Education.
- Vicky, Mrs. Norman, Senior Executive Officer, Child Support Agency, Department for Work and Pensions.
- Sheila Maureen, Mrs. O'Neill. For services to Music in Ackworth, West Yorkshire.
- Valerie Ann, Mrs. O'Riordan. For services to the community in Berkshire.
- Barbara, Mrs. Oakes, Manager, High Street Library. For services to Local Government in Bolton.
- Marjorie Frances, Mrs. Oaten. For voluntary service to People with Eating Disorders.
- Margaret May, Mrs. Oatey. For services to the community in East Anglia.
- Stella, Mrs. Okeahialam, Programme Director, Croydon Enterprise. For service to Business.
- Michael Joseph Rolfe Orbell. For services to the Scouts in Wimbledon and Merton, London.
- Noel George Ormrod, lately Chairman, Wallasey Arts Council. For services to the Arts in Merseyside.
- Alexander Orr, Craftsman, Commonwealth War Graves Commission, Scotland.
- Arnold Jenkin Owen. For services to the community in Blackmill, Bridgend and to Welsh International Brigaders.
- Margaret Mcalister, Mrs. Owen. For services to the community in Shrewsbury, Shropshire.
- Ms Margaret Paisley, College Manager, Elmwood College, Residence and Student Union. For services to Further Education in Fife.
- Margaret Frances Elizabeth, Mrs. Palmer. For public service.
- Ms Lydia Joy Parbury. For services to People with Special Needs and Disabilities.
- Dorothy Mary, Mrs. Parker, Community Support Worker, West Wirral Community Mental Health Team. For services to Healthcare.
- John Bywell Parker. For voluntary service to the Hadrian Trust in the North East.
- Ann Rosemary, Mrs. Parr, Community Care Development Manager, Age Concern, Woodley. For services to Older People in Berkshire.
- Rabindara Nath Pathak, Chairman of Governors, Featherstone High School, Ealing, London. For voluntary service to Education.
- Trevor James Patton, Principal Nursing Officer, Northern Ireland Prison Service.
- Margaret Elsie, Mrs. Perfect. For voluntary service to the Boys' Brigade in Watford, Hertfordshire.
- Alderman Fred Perry. For services to the community in Tipton, West Midlands.
- Joan, Mrs. Phillips. For voluntary service to the Museum of Science and Industry in Manchester.
- Roger Phillips. For services to London Garden Squares.
- Jean Catherine, Mrs. Pickering. For services to Athletics and to the Ron Pickering Memorial Fund.
- Alice Kirsty, Lady Pilkington. For voluntary service to Willowbrook Hospice, St. Helens and Knowsley, Merseyside.
- Pauline, Mrs. Pilkington, Director, Children's Services, Walsall Council. For services to Local Government.
- Professor Robert Michael Pittilo, Principal and Vice-Chancellor, Robert Gordon University of Aberdeen. For services to Healthcare.
- Dr. Jaswant Kaur Jutley-Plested, Manager, Sydenham Children's Centre, Bridgwater, Somerset. For services to Children.
- Peter Pocock. For services to Workplace First Aid Training.
- Miss Rashmi Amritlal Popat, Executive Officer, Work Welfare and Equality Group, Department for Work and Pensions.
- Ms Prudence Alexine Regina Porretta. For services to Community Cohesion and to the Tourist Industry in Coventry.
- Iain David Russell Prain, Vice-Principal, Royal Blind School, Craigmillar Park, Edinburgh. For services to Education.
- Stephen Prescott. For services to Rugby League and to Charity.
- Gres, Mrs. Pritchard, Peripatetic Music Teacher, Ynys Mon. For services to Education.
- The Reverend Dr. Jean Prosser. For services to Conservation and to the community in Monmouthshire.
- Isabel, Mrs. Quinliven, Founder, Caring Canines. For services to Older People in Northern Ireland.
- Brenda, Mrs. Quinn, Service Manager, Recovery Services, Belfast Health and Social Care Trust. For services to Mental Healthcare.
- Toaha Bashir Zulqarnain Qureshi. For services to Community Relations in Stockwell, South West London.
- Maureen, Mrs. Raine, Office Manager, English Language Teaching Unit, University of Leicester. For services to Higher Education.
- Dr. Kathleen Rankin. For voluntary service to the Living Linen Project in Northern Ireland.
- Mohamad Rashied, President, Caribbean Islamic Cultural Society. For services to Community Relations in London.
- Robert David Richard Ray. For services to Rugby Union and to Young People in Rugby, Warwickshire.
- Ms Janet Mary Reed, Senior Social Worker, Defence Medical Rehabilitation Centre, Headley Court, Surrey, Ministry of Defence.
- Angela Mary, Mrs. Rees, Assistant Head, Debt Management and Banking, H.M. Revenue and Customs.
- Abdul Rehman. For services to the community in Derby.
- Miss Marion Reynolds. For services to Vulnerable Children in Northern Ireland.
- Alan Ribchester. For charitable services in the City of Durham.
- The Reverend James Manson Richards. For services to Children and Families.
- George Edmund Richardson, lately Chairman, Calderdale College and Chairman, Association of Colleges, Yorkshire and the Humber Region. For voluntary service to Further Education.
- Miss Rosalyn Elizabeth Richardson, lately Deputy Director of Health Informatics, Nottingham University Hospitals NHS Trust. For services to the NHS.
- Andrew William Ritchie, Technical Director, Brompton Bicycle Ltd. For services to Business and to International Trade.
- Christopher David Medwyn Roberts. For services to the community in Merseyside.
- Clarissa Elizabeth, Mrs. Roberts. For services to Older People in Stratford-upon-Avon, Warwickshire.
- Jean Sylvia, Mrs. Roberts, Ministerial Messenger, Department for Transport.
- Peter Adrian Roberts, Chairman, Association of Community Rail Partnerships. For services to Rural Transport.
- Angus John Robertson, Principal Fellow in Clinical Illustration, Leeds Dental Institute. For services to Healthcare.
- Matthew Robertson, Sergeant, Ministry of Defence Police.
- Norman Robertson, lately Curriculum Leader in Hospitality, Ayr College. For services to Further Education.
- Margaret, Mrs. Robinson. For services to the community in Trimdon, County Durham.
- The Reverend Father George Edward Robson, Chairman, North Huyton New Deal for Communities Board. For services to the community in Merseyside.
- Ms Jennifer Van Krieken Robson, Head of Minority Achievement Service, Kent County Council. For services to Education.
- Sheila Ruth, Mrs. Rodmell. For services to the community in Elvington, Kent.
- Ms Susan Rogers. For services to Trade Unions.
- Ruth Lady Rogers of Riverside, Chef and Co-Founder, River Cafe ́. For services to the Hospitality Industry.
- William Andrew Taylor Roulston. For services to Equestrian Sport in Northern Ireland.
- Beryl Lillian, Mrs. Rowe. For services to the community in Lilley, Bedfordshire.
- Dr. Christopher Giles Rowland. For services to the Friends of the Oncology and Radiotherapy Centre, Exeter.
- John Rowlands, Economics Teacher, John Ruskin Sixth Form College, Croydon, London. For services to Education.
- Marion, Mrs. Roy, lately Headteacher, Auchenback Primary School, East Renfrewshire. For services to Education.
- Colonel John Anthony Nutter Read Royle. For services to the Soldiers', Sailors', Airmen and Families Association in Northamptonshire.
- Chrissie, Mrs. Rucker, Founder and Creative Director, White Company. For services to the Retail Industry.
- Anthony Michael Hurst Rumsey, Collections Manager, National Monuments Record. For services to Photography.
- Annette, Mrs. Rushton, lately Matron, Severn Hospice, Shrewsbury. For services to Healthcare.
- Dr. Andrew Oldrey Russell, lately Chairman, League of Friends, Edenbridge and District War Memorial Hospital. For services to Healthcare.
- Ezriel Salomon. For services to the community in Gateshead, Tyne and Wear.
- Ahmed Ali Sasso, Constable, Hampshire Constabulary. For services to the Police.
- Mary Ann Landsborough, Mrs. Saunders. For services to the Diocese of Oxford and to the Church of England.
- Ms Susan Saunders, Co-Ordinator, Disability Support Network, Home Office.
- Keith Savage. For voluntary service to the Air Training Corps in Rutland.
- Lynn, Mrs. Savill. For services to People with Epilepsy in Gravesend, Kent.
- Ms Cherryl Lynn Sawyer, Business and Development Director, Threshold Housing Link. For services to Homeless People in Swindon, Wiltshire.
- Callie, Mrs. Saxty, lately Head of Visitor Operations for Cornwall and the Isles of Scilly, English Heritage. For services to Heritage.
- Nora Gladys Elsie, Mrs. Schneider. For services to the community in Newbury, Berkshire.
- Robert Sinclair Scott. For voluntary service to the community in County Armagh.
- The Reverend Christopher John Sears. For services to Disadvantaged People in Hastings, East Sussex.
- Dr. Claude Doumet Serhal, Special Assistant, British Museum. For services to Archaeology.
- Thomas Richard Sermon, Chairman, London Youth. For services to Young People.
- Terence Brian Shead. For services to the community in East Peckham, Kent.
- Alan William Sherriff. For services to the community in South Yorkshire.
- Ann, Mrs. Shreeve, Senior Executive Officer, Jobcentre Plus, Department for Work and Pensions.
- Jasvinder Singh Sidhu. For services to Social Housing.
- Phillip Edward Sillick, J.P. For services to the community in Gorseinon, Swansea.
- Benjamin David Simpson, J.P. For services to the community in Oxford.
- Kathleen, Mrs. Simpson. For services to the community in Moston, Manchester.
- Lemn Sissay, Poet and Performer. For services to Literature.
- John William Skinner, Director of Music, Haberdashers' Aske's Hatcham College, Lewisham, London. For services to Education.
- Catherine, Mrs. Slow. For services to West Exmoor Federation of Schools, Devon.
- Alison Mary, Mrs. Smedley. For services to Inland Waterways.
- Amanda Jane, Mrs. Smith, Executive Assistant, Youth Task Force Strategy, Department for Children, Schools and Families.
- Dr. Angela Owen-Smith. For services to Medicine and to the community in Huntingdon, Cambridgeshire.
- Miss Charlotte Lilian Smith. For services to the community in Porthyrhyd, Carmarthenshire.
- Colin Smith, Retained Crew Manager, West Yorkshire Fire and Rescue Service. For services to Local Government.
- Elizabeth, Mrs. Smith, Vice-Chair and Board Member, Colchester Institute. For voluntary service to Further and Higher Education.
- Ian Graham Smith. For services to the community in Ramsbury, Wiltshire.
- James Smith. For voluntary service to Youth Football in Glasgow.
- Eric Snook, Foster Carer, Hampshire. For services to Children and Families.
- Mary, Mrs. Snook, Foster Carer, Hampshire. For services to Children and Families.
- Dr. Richard Alfred Sparks, lately Consultant in Genito-Urinary Medicine, Cardiff and Vale NHS Trust. For services to Medicine.
- Councillor Josephine Elizabeth Spencer. For services to the community in Christchurch, Dorset.
- Dr. Richard Anthony Spencer, Biology Subject Leader, SRC Bede Sixth Form, Billingham, Teesside. For services to Science Communication.
- Sally Louise, Mrs. Hughes-Stanton, Executive Secretary, Prime Minister's Office.
- Roger Carlton Steele. For services to Young People in Sheffield.
- Cheryl, Mrs. Stevens, Principal Practitioner, Benefits and Credits, Preston, H.M. Revenue and Customs.
- Mary, Mrs. Stevens. For services to the community in Swindon, Wiltshire.
- Edward Craig Stevenson, lately Engineer of Medical Physics, University of Aberdeen. For services to Healthcare and to Charity.
- Karen, Mrs. Stock, Extended Schools Co-ordinator, Shoeburyness and Chair of Governors, Shoeburyness High School, Essex. For services to Education.
- Rodney Ernest Stoddart. For voluntary service to Mountain Rescue in Tayside.
- Eric Arthur Stott. For services to the community in the West Midlands.
- Janet, Mrs. Stoyel. For services to the Textile Industry.
- Miss Judith Anne Strange, Higher Executive Officer, Jobcentre Plus, Department for Work and Pensions.
- Councillor Phyllis Zaphne Stretton. For services to the community in Cannock, Staffordshire.
- Ivy Alberta, Mrs. Sturgeon, Personal Secretary, H.M. Prison Littlehey, Huntingdon, H.M. Prison Service, Ministry of Justice.
- Rozelle Elizabeth, Mrs. Sutherland. For voluntary service to Victims of Domestic Violence in Jersey.
- Roderick John Symonds. For services to the community in Reading, Berkshire.
- Ranjula, Mrs. Takodra. For services to the community in Aylesbury, Buckinghamshire.
- Gwynneth Mary, Mrs. Tame. For services to Heritage and to the community of Dorchester-on-Thames in Oxfordshire.
- Susan, Mrs. Tamlyn. For services to Heritage in Suffolk.
- Miss Samantha Claire Taylor, Cricketer. For services to Sport.
- James Graham Taylor, Music Director, City of Glasgow Chorus. For services to Music.
- Josephine May, Mrs. Taylor. For services to the community in Plumpton Green, East Sussex.
- Mary, Mrs. Thirlwell. For voluntary service to Young People in Lanarkshire.
- Ms Melanie Anne Thody, Head of Outreach, Imperial College London. For services to Science Communication.
- Margaret Jean, Mrs. Thomas, J.P., D.L. For services to the community in Bristol.
- Peter Thomas, lately Project Director Devonport, Interserve plc. For services to the Defence Industry.
- Jonathan Bryan Thornes. For services to the Voluntary Sector in the East Midlands.
- Gordon Owen Thornhill. For services to the community in Foston and Scropton, Derbyshire.
- Angus Tilston. For services to the Historical Film Industry in the North West.
- Thomas Todd. For services to the community in Northern Ireland.
- Pamela, Mrs. Towning, Assistant Officer, Customer Contact, Shipley, West Yorkshire, H.M. Revenue and Customs.
- Maureen Ivy, Mrs. Townley. For charitable services in Southend-on-Sea, Essex.
- Van Cuong Truong. For services to the Indo-Chinese community in South East London.
- Evelyn Roberta, Mrs. Turkington. For voluntary service to The Duke of Edinburgh's Award Scheme in Northern Ireland.
- Mary Josephine, Mrs. Turner, President, GMB. For services to Trade Unions.
- Edward Jonathan Turpie, Director, Maverick Television.
- Dr. Alan Manson Turtle. For voluntary service to the community in Richhill, County Armagh.
- Miss Elizabeth Kimberley Tweddle. For services to Gymnastics.
- John Christopher Tyzack, Chairman of Governors, Enborne Church of England Primary School and Willow Primary School, Newbury, Berkshire. For voluntary service to Education.
- Wendy Margaret, Mrs. Vaughan. For services to the community in South East Surrey.
- Ronald Derek Vaulter. For services to the community in South Devon.
- Christine, Mrs. Ruston-Wadsworth, Superintendent, Warwickshire Police. For services to the Police.
- Julian Wadsworth. For services to Young People in Portsmouth.
- Janice Irene, Mrs. Walker, Officer, H.M. Prison Wormwood Scrubs, London, H.M. Prison Service, Ministry of Justice.
- Pamela, Mrs. Walker, Chair of Governors, Cambo First School, Morpeth, Northumberland. For voluntary service to Education.
- Gillian Karen, Mrs. Walnes (formerly Mrs. Bogush). For services to the Anne Frank Trust UK.
- Joan Patricia, Mrs. Warwick. For charitable services to Darent Valley Hospital, Dartford, Kent.
- Amir Waseem, Officer, Customer Contact, Brierley Hill, West Midlands, H.M. Revenue and Customs.
- Shirley Irene, Mrs. Watson. For services to the Idiopathic Thrombocytopenic Purpura Support Association.
- The Reverend Canon Michael John Wedgeworth, lately Chairman of Governors, Blackburn College. For voluntary service to Further Education and to the communityin Lancashire.
- Michael Edwin Weeding, Senior Officer, Customs and International, London, H.M. Revenue and Customs.
- James Weir, Lecturer, Forth Valley College. For services to Further Education in Clackmannanshire.
- David Anthony Westcott, J.P. For services to the community in Essex.
- Audrey, Mrs. Wheeler. For voluntary service to Oxfam in St. Albans, Hertfordshire.
- Norman Edward Whereat. For services to the community in Cirencester, Gloucestershire.
- Hilary John White, Chairman of Governors, Willingdon Community School, Eastbourne, East Sussex. For voluntary service to Education.
- John Samuel Byard White, J.P., D.L. For services to the community in Somerset.
- Nicholas Stephen Whitehouse. For services to the Building Industry.
- David Widdowson. For services to Young People with Learning Disabilities in Chesterfield, Derbyshire.
- Alan Bertram Wiggins. For services to the community in Clacton-on-Sea, Essex.
- Philip Julian Wilde. For voluntary service to Young People in Lytham St Anne's, Lancashire.
- Dr. Henry Austin Will. For voluntary service to Ford Park Cemetery Trust in Plymouth, Devon.
- Doreen, Mrs. Willcocks. For services to Netball and to the community in Pinehurst, Swindon, Wiltshire.
- Paul Willgoss, Band 3, Chief Scientists' Advisory Group and Chairman, Disability Network, Health and Safety Executive, Department for Work and Pensions.
- Christopher Mark Williams, Director, Heart n Soul. For services to Disability Arts.
- David Michael Williams. For services to the community in Flintshire.
- Gwilym Alun Williams. For services to Sport for Young People in Wales.
- Professor Robert Joseph Paton Williams. For services to the community in North Oxford.
- Gerald Willmott, Constable, Metropolitan Police Service. For services to the Police and to Boxing in the London Borough of Haringey.
- Albert Leslie Wills, Q.F.S.M. For services to the community in the West Midlands.
- Patrick Andrew John Wilson, Grade C1, Ministry of Defence.
- Sydney Wiltshire. For services to the community in Petersfield, Hampshire.
- Andrew Nicholas Wood, Manager and Head Coach, Ipswich Gymnastics Centre. For services to Sport.
- Maureen, Mrs. Woodcock, lately Non-Executive Director, Walsall Hospitals NHS Trust. For services to Healthcare.
- Agnes Brown Marchbank, Mrs. Wright. For voluntary service to the Royal National Lifeboat Institution, Stewartry of Kirkcudbright.
- Clare Margaret, Mrs. Wright, Personal Assistant, Warwickshire College. For services to Further Education.
- Richard Kelsey Wright, Chief Executive Officer, Intertius Ltd. For services to the Manufacturing Industry.
- Beryl Joan, Mrs. Wyatt, Gardening Assistant, Writtle College, Chelmsford. For services to Higher Education.
- Claire Judith, Mrs. Wylot, Grade C1, Ministry of Defence.
- Councillor Yogan Mylvaganam Yoganathan. For services to Local Government and to Community Relations in North Surrey.
- Jeannie, Mrs. Young, For voluntary service to St. Richard's Hospice, Worcester.
- Pauline Margaret, Mrs. Young. For voluntary service to disabled people in Wales.
- Mavis, Mrs. Yuill, Classroom Assistant, Kilmartin Primary School, Argyll and Bute. For services to Education.

Diplomatic and Overseas List

- Christopher Barr – First Secretary, Foreign and Commonwealth Office.
- Paul William Bellamy – lately Entrance Clearance Manager, British Embassy, Iran.
- Steve Chandler – lately Third Secretary, Counter-Narcotics, UK Provincial Reconstruction Team, Lashkar Gah.
- Jeanette Anne Coogan – Manager, British Council English Training Centre, Al Azhar University in Cairo. For services to UK-Egypt intercultural relations.
- Rossalyn Demelza Crotty – Vice-Consul/Deputy Head, British Consulate, Málaga, Spain.
- Dr. Margaret Cumberland – Co-ordinator, Community Health. For services to community health care in Mozambique.
- Elyse Anne Dodgson – Head, International Department, Royal Court Theatre, London. For services to international theatre, and to young writers overseas.
- Dr. Alexander Charles Weeks Duncan – Health worker. For services to primary health care in north Afghanistan.
- Eleanor Frances Duncan – Health worker. For services to primary health care in north Afghanistan.
- Michael Feeney – Founder, County Mayo Peace Park. For services to UK-Ireland relations.
- Anne Ferguson For services to older people in Scotland
- Judith Anne Ferris – lately President, Age Concern, Costa Blanca. For services to the British elderly community in Alicante, Spain.
- Wendi Nixon Fiedler – Founder and Manager, Panatel Production Company. For services to heritage conservation in Bermuda.
- Norman Keith Goodall – For charitable activities and services to the community in Tenerife, Spain.
- Nicholas John Hancocks – First Secretary, Foreign and Commonwealth Office.
- Peter Anthony Hibbard – President, Royal Asiatic Society. For services to heritage conservation in Shanghai, China.
- Garry Horlacher – Security Co-ordinator and Adviser to the Government of Sierra Leone. For services to international policing, and promoting democracy in Sierra Leone.
- Victor Malvern Jackopson – Founder and Head, Hope Now. For charitable activities, and services to orphans and other young people in Cherkassy, Ukraine.
- Renee Jacqueline Jordan – Head of Registry, British Embassy Office, Basra.
- Mairwen Karydis – British Consular Correspondent, Lesvos. For services to consular work in Greece.
- Nigel Jeffery Randle Kay – Founder and Head, Homes in Zimbabwe. For services to the elderly in Zimbabwe.
- Christopher Kealey – lately First Secretary Political, British Embassy, Afghanistan.
- Paul Lawrence – lately British Vice Consul, Thailand.
- Cynthia Albrecht-Lelliott – Honorary Vice-President, British Ladies Club. For services to the British community in Luxembourg and UK-Luxembourg relations.
- Dr. Raymond George-MacKay – Educational Consultant. For services to English teaching, especially in West Bengal, India.
- Bryan Andrew Morgan – Second Secretary, Foreign and Commonwealth Office.
- Hazel Jane Nelder – First Secretary, Foreign and Commonwealth Office.
- Anthony John Nott – UK Policing Adviser, Office of the United States Co-ordinator, Palestine. For services to international policing, more recently in Iraq and Palestine.
- Jean Catherine Pickering – For services to athletics and to the Ron Pickering Memorial Fund.
- Stephen Peter John Schembri – First Secretary, Foreign and Commonwealth Office.
- Joanna Wright-Serra – Founding member, JUCONI (Juntos con los Ninos—Together with Children). For services to street children and other charitable activities in Mexico.
- Keith Shonfeld – Cemetery Administrator, British Cemetery Committee – For services to the British community in Cyprus.
- Dr. Malcolm Swann – Medical Director, Beit Cure International Hospital, Lusaka. For medical services in Zambia.
- Peter Dyce Tear – Executive Producer, 59E59 Theatres in New York. For services to UK/USA cultural relations.
- David Richard Vaughan Thomas – Chairman, British-Polish Chamber of Commerce. For services to British business interests and charitable activities in Poland.
- Iwona Thomas – Founder and Manager, The British School, Warsaw. For services to education.
- Sally Thompson – Deputy Executive Director, Thailand-Burma Border Consortium. For services to Burmese refugees in Thailand.
- Kedell Melody Worboys – St. Helena Government Representative in the UK. For services to St. Helena.

=== Royal Red Cross ===
==== Royal Red Cross (Second Class) ====
Army

- Major John Clark

=== Queen's Police Medal (QPM) ===
England and Wales

- Christopher Adams, Constable, Avon and Somerset Constabulary.
- Andrew Bliss, Deputy Chief Constable, Essex Police.
- David Keith Cook, Acting Detective Chief Inspector, West Midlands Police.
- Ms Cressida Rose Dick, Assistant Commissioner, Metropolitan Police Service.
- Robert Arthur Evans, Assistant Chief Constable, South Wales Police (Home Office Seconded).
- Michael Field, Detective Superintendent, British Transport Police.
- Kevin Trevor Flint, Detective Superintendent, Nottinghamshire Police.
- Christopher David Lee, Deputy Chief Constable, Dorset Police.
- Paul O'Connor, Inspector, Hertfordshire Police.
- Sir Hugh Stephen Roden Orde, O.B.E., President, Association of Chief Police Officers.
- Geoffrey William Owen, lately Constable, Metropolitan Police Service.
- Gary Richardson, Detective Superintendent, Metropolitan Police Service.
- Ms Susan Karen Sim, Deputy Chief Constable, Northumbria Police.
- Julie Anne, Mrs. Spence, O.B.E., Chief Constable, Cambridgeshire Police.
- Stephen John Thomas, Assistant Chief Constable, British Transport Police.
- Malcolm Philip Tillyer, lately Chief Superintendent, Metropolitan Police Service.
- Ms Wendy Ann Walker, Assistant Chief Constable, Lancashire Constabulary.
- David John Whatton, Chief Constable, Cheshire Police.

Scotland

- Ms Maureen Brown, lately Assistant Chief Constable, Central Scotland Police.
- Iain Clark Howie, Constable, Dumfries and Galloway Constabulary.
- Gordon Meldrum, Director General, Scottish Crime and Drug Enforcement Agency.

Northern Ireland

- Robert Lindsay Ellison, Sergeant, Police Service of Northern Ireland.
- Mark William James McDowell, Detective Chief Superintendent, Police Service of Northern Ireland.
- David Robert Adams McFall, Sergeant, Police Service of Northern Ireland.

=== Queen's Volunteer Reserves Medal (QVRM) ===
Army

- Major Mark Brotherston

Royal Air Force

- Sergeant Terence Morton

== Crown Dependencies ==
=== The Most Excellent Order of the British Empire ===
==== Commanders of the Order of the British Empire (CBE) ====
Isle of Man

- George Daniels MBE, for services to Horology

==== Officer of the Order of the British Empire (OBE) ====
Jersey

- Sally Le Brocq, for services to the Administration of Justice and to the community in Jersey
- Edward Sallis, for services to Education

==== Member of the Order of the British Empire (MBE) ====
Jersey

- James Joseph Caulfield, for voluntary service to Disadvantaged People in Kenya
- Rozelle Elizabeth Sutherland, for voluntary service to Victims of Domestic Violence in Jersey

== Cook Islands ==
=== Order of the British Empire ===
==== Officer of the Order of the British Empire (OBE) ====
- The Honourable Ngamau Mere, Mrs. Munokoa. For public service and services to the community

==== Member of the Order of the British Empire (MBE) ====
- Tiriakau Vakapora, Mrs. Nicholls. For public service and services to the community.

=== British Empire Medal (BEM) ===
- Metuakore Teremoana Kora. For services to the public and the Church.
- Mangere Malo. For services to the public.

== Barbados ==
=== Order of Saint Michael and Saint George ===
==== Knight Commander of the Order of St Michael and St George (KCMG) ====
- Lawrence Vernon Harcourt Lewis, G.C.M., J.P. For services to the financial and public sectors

=== Order of the British Empire ===
==== Commander of the Order of the British Empire (CBE) ====
- Maria Aneta Violetta, Mrs. Asgill, J.P. For services to Health Care.
- Montague Delisle Fitzcrichlow Barrow, B.S.S., J.P. For services to the community.
- Joseph Nathanial Niles, B.S.S. For services to Gospel Music.

==== Officer of the Order of the British Empire (OBE) ====
- Hugh Anthony Arthur. For service to tourism.
- Earl Wensley Glasgow. For services to education and to the Barbadian Diaspora in New York.
- Lucy Andrea Adelle, Mrs. Gollop-Greenidge. For services to the performing arts.

==== Member of the Order of the British Empire (MBE) ====
- Neville Nigel Pinder. For services to the Barbados Water Authority.
- Cora Frances, Mrs. Holder-Waldron. For services to education and the Teachers' Credit Union.
- Ms Shelly Elizabeth Weir. For services as a community activist

== Grenada ==
=== Order of the British Empire ===
==== Officer of the Order of the British Empire (OBE) ====
- Franklyn Theodore St. Bernard Bullen. For services to business.

==== Member of the Order of the British Empire (MBE) ====
- Ms Susanna Antoine. For services to education.
- Elwyn McQuilkin. For services to culture.
- Jason Roberts. For services to sport.

=== British Empire Medal (BEM) ===
- Ms Faith Jessamy. For public service training and farming.

== Papua New Guinea ==
=== Order of Saint Michael and Saint George ===
==== Knight Commander of the Order of St Michael and St George (KCMG) ====
- Sir Frederick Bernard Carl Reiher, K.B.E., C.M.G. For services to public administration, commerce and the development of Papua New Guinea's National Awards system.

== Solomon Islands ==
=== Order of Saint Michael and Saint George ===
==== Companion of the Order of St Michael and St George (CMG) ====
- Father John William Toketa Lamani, O.B.E. For services to the media, the Church and the community.

=== Order of the British Empire ===
==== Officer of the Order of the British Empire (OBE) ====
- Wayne Fredrick Morris. For services to commerce, charity and the community.

==== Member of the Order of the British Empire (NBE) ====
- Chief Samuel Tauhanihorona Hou'asia. For services to the Church, the community and for voluntary work.
- The Reverend Justus Charles Lesimaoma. For services to the Church, the Government and the community.

== St Lucia ==
=== Order of Saint Michael and Saint George ===
==== Knight Commander of the Order of St Michael and St George (KCMG) ====
- The Honourable Dr. Dunstan Gerbert Raphael St.Omer, M.B.E. For services to Art.

== Belize ==
=== Order of Saint Michael and Saint George ===
==== Knight Commander of the Order of St Michael and St George (KCMG) ====
- The Right Honourable Manuel Esquivel. For services to politics and to good governance.

=== Order of the British Empire ===
==== Commander of the Order of the British Empire (CBE) ====
- Henry Vallon Young, Sr. For services to politics and to entrepreneurship.

==== Officer of the Order of the British Empire (OBE) ====
- The Reverend Charles David Goff. For services to religion.
- Romel Tiburcio Perdomo. For services to business and to entrepreneurship.

==== Member of the Order of the British Empire (MBE) ====
- Eulogio Cano. For services to teaching and to social development.
- Antonio Duncan McPherson, J.P. For services to the community.
- Kenneth Wilfred Morgan. For services to culture and to entertainment.
- Samuel Alexander Rhaburn. For services to politics.
- Philip Norman Timmons, J.P. For services to the Police and to the community.

== Antigua and Barbuda ==
=== Order of the British Empire ===
==== Member of the Order of the British Empire (MBE) ====
- Cordel Eden Alexander Josiah. For public service.
- Myrna Loretta, Mrs. Byron-Scholl. For public service.

== Saint Christopher and Nevis ==
=== Order of Saint Michael and Saint George ===
==== Knight Commander of the Order of St Michael and St George (KCMG) ====
- Edmund Wickham Lawrence, O.B.E. For services to Banking and Finance.

==== Companion of the Order of St Michael and St George (CMG) ====
- Charles Lucien Arthur Wilkin, Q.C. For services to the Law.

=== Order of the British Empire ===
==== Member of the Order of the British Empire (MBE) ====
- Goldwin O. Caines. For public service.
- Lieutenant Colonel Norman Leroy Williams. For services to national security.
