= Janet Darbyshire =

British epidemiologist

Janet Howard Darbyshire CBE FMedSci
- Education: London School of Hygiene and Tropical Medicine, MSc
- Occupations: Epidemiologist and science administrator
- Employer: Medical Research Council (Clinical Trials Unit)
- Awards: Fellow of the Academy of Medical Sciences, the Royal College of Physicians, and the Society for Clinical Trials

Janet Howard Darbyshire is a British epidemiologist and science administrator.

== Early life ==
She lived on Woodlands Drive in Knutsford.

She attended Manchester High School for Girls, where she appeared, aged 14, in the first edition of Television Top of the Form on Monday 12 November 1962. In the team were Barbara Flowerdew, aged 16, of Hill Top Avenue, in Cheadle Hulme; Janet Berry, aged 13, of Freshfield Road, in Heaton Mersey; and Lesley Wilson, aged 12, of Gerrard Avenue, in Timperley. Barbara later studied Maths at Oxford University in 1963.

Janet graduated in Medicine at the University of Manchester in 1970.

== Career ==
Darbyshire joined the Medical Research Council (MRC) in 1974, first co-ordinating clinical trials and epidemiological studies of tuberculosis, asthma and other respiratory diseases in the UK and East Africa for the MRC Tuberculosis and Chest Diseases Unit. She became the head of the MRC HIV Clinical Trials Centre when it was founded in 1989, designing and co-ordinating multi-centre trials of therapeutics for people with HIV, as well as vaccines and microbicides to prevent infection.

In 1980, Darbyshire was awarded an MSc by the London School of Hygiene and Tropical Medicine.

In 1998, she became head of the new MRC Clinical Trials Unit, established as a centre of excellence for clinical trials, meta-analyses and epidemiological studies in HIV, cancer and other diseases. She is also co-director of the UK Clinical Research Network (UKCRN). During her time their she has tried to improve cancer management through clinical trials. As of 2013, she is on the board of the Lister Institute of Preventive Medicine and the Society for Clinical Trials.

== Awards and honours ==
Darbyshire is a fellow of the Academy of Medical Sciences, the Royal College of Physicians and the Society for Clinical Trials.

Already an Officer of the Order of the British Empire (OBE), she was elevated to Commander of the Order of the British Empire (CBE) in the 2010 New Year Honours for "services to Clinical Science".

In 2018, Darbyshire was awarded the MRC Millennium Medal for her "world-leading research on clinical trials and epidemiology has prevented disease and saved lives across the world".
