= Alastair Salvesen =

British billionaire businessman and heir (1941–2024)

- Born: Alastair Eric Hotson Salvesen; 29 July 1941; Fife, Scotland
- Died: 9 December 2024 (aged 83); Edinburgh, Scotland
- Education: Fettes College
- Alma mater: Cranfield University
- Occupation: Businessman
- Spouse: Elizabeth Salvesen
- Children: 2

Alastair Eric Hotson Salvesen, CBE (29 July 1941 – 9 December 2024) was a British billionaire businessman and heir.

== Early life ==
Alastair Eric Hotson Salvesen was born on 29 July 1941, the son of Marion Hamilton (née McClure, died 1997) and Iver Ronald Stuart Salvesen (1901–1957). They owned Bonnington House from 1944 to 1978. Iver Salvesen was the grandson of the Norwegian, Christian Fredrik Salvesen (1827–1911), who, in 1846, founded the Christian Salvesen whaling and shipping company, whose first venture was sponsoring a ship to catch herring.

He was educated at Fettes College, and Cranfield University where he obtained an MBA. He was a chartered accountant. His first job was at a towel and bedding maker in Montreal, Canada.

== Career ==
Salvesen was chairman of Dawnfresh Seafoods Ltd, Dawnfresh Holdings Ltd, Scot Trout Ltd, RR Spink and Sons Ltd, Dovecot Studios Ltd, The Dovecot Foundation, Praha Investment Holdings Ltd, Edinburgh New Town Cookery School Ltd, Fettes Enterprises Ltd 1995, and had various other business interests.

In April 2015, the Sunday Times estimated his net worth at £1.0 billion In 2020, Salvesen received £214,363 from the Common Agricultural Policy, which included £64,425 for Greening Practices including a Grey Partridge conservation project on the Whitburgh Farm Estate.

Salvesen was a board member of the early-stage technology and science investor group Archangels from 2009 until he stepped down in March 2019.

== Philanthropy ==
Salvesen donated £5 million to found The Salvesen Mindroom Centre at the University of Edinburgh. The Centre supports children and adults with learning difficulties.

== Honours ==
Salvesen was appointed a CBE in the 2010 New Year Honours for services to the arts and charity in Scotland.

== Personal life and death ==
Salvesen was married to Elizabeth, and they had a daughter Venetia and a son George.

In 1992, they bought the Whitburgh estate near Pathhead, Midlothian.

Alastair Salvesen died suddenly in Edinburgh, on 9 December 2024, at the age of 83.
