= Richard Lapthorne =

English-born Guernsey billionaire (born 1943)

- Born: 25 April 1943 (age 83)
- Education: Liverpool University
- Occupations: Non-Executive Director, Chairman
- Employer: Cable & Wireless
- Spouse: Valerie
- Children: Two sons and two daughters

Sir Richard Douglas Lapthorne CBE (born 25 April 1943) is an English company director, best known for his role at Cable & Wireless Worldwide.

He was knighted in the 2010 New Year Honours for services to telecommunications.
