= Susan Halabi =

Biostatistician

- Education: University of Texas Health Science Center at Houston
- Known for: Research on prostate cancer
- Awards: Fellow of the Society for Clinical Trials, Fellow of the American Statistical Association
- Scientific career
- Fields: Biostatistics, Bioinformatics
- Workplaces: Duke University
- Thesis: (1994)

Susan Halabi is a professor of biostatistics and bioinformatics at Duke University, known for her research on prostate cancer.

As a member of the data safety monitoring board for a study of the anti-prostate cancer effects of abiraterone acetate (Zytiga), she argued that stopping the study early had prevented the study from accurately determining the effectiveness of the drug, and possibly made it appear to be more effective than it actually was. She also took part in a study showing that, when prostate cancer has reached the point of spreading to other parts of the body, the parts that it spreads to can be used to predict the survival rate from the disease.

Education

Halabi earned her Ph.D. in biometry from the University of Texas Health Science Center at Houston in 1994, and joined the Duke faculty in 1996. She grew up in a family of engineers in Lebanon, where she was one of the first students in the undergraduate biostatistics program at the American University of Beirut. She was named a fellow of the Society for Clinical Trials in 2014, "for her outstanding leadership in cancer clinical trials and prognostic development, ... educational activities, and for dedicated service on national review committees, DSMBs and scientific advisory committees and for the SCT". She was elected as a Fellow of the American Statistical Association in 2015.

News

On June 11, 2024, Dr. Halabi appeared in an interview at URO Today, where she discussed Integrating Genetic Variants and Clinical Factors for Improved Prostate Cancer Prognostication.

Awards

In 2022, Duke University School of Medicine awarded Dr. Halabi the Janet L. Norwood Award for her outstanding career and recognition as a woman in statistical sciences.

In 2025, Boston University of School of Public Health, Department of Biostatistics, awarded Susan Halabi the L.Adrienne Cupples Award for Excellence in Teaching, Research, and Service in Biostatistics.
