= Mark Wilkinson (designer) =

Mark Wilkinson OBE
- Born: Mark Roger Wilkinson; 1950; London, England
- Died: 5 July 2017 (aged 66)
- Occupation: Designer/Inventor
- Known for: Company of Mark Wilkinson Furniture and Smallbone of Devizes

Mark Roger Wilkinson OBE, OLM (1950 – 5 July 2017) was an English furniture designer.

== Career ==
Wilkinson was the founding designer of Mark Wilkinson Furniture and Smallbone of Devizes. Both companies make fitted furniture and became divisions of Canburg Ltd.

He was a visiting lecturer in Design Creativity at the University of the West of England (UWE) and contributed to design teaching at the Rotherham College of Arts and Technology, Rycotewood College, and the Chelsea-based KLC Design School.

== Awards and recognition ==
Wilkinson was described by Eliot Nusbaum, writing in the Sunday Times, as the "Mozart of Kitchen Cabinet Makers" while the Editor of the key publication for interior designers and product designers, idFX, called him the "Finest Designer of our Time". He received the kitchen industry's inaugural Lifetime Achievement Award in 2004, and the T at the industry awards ceremony in 2007. His furniture too is award-winning, every range carrying the Guild Mark of the Worshipful Company of Furniture Makers, while the company that bears his name was awarded the Employer of the Year Award for its work in providing apprenticeships for young furniture makers. The apprenticeship scheme saw Wilkinson working with the local Wiltshire College to adapt an existing course to suit the needs of cabinet making. In 2008, he opened a showroom in New York City.

He was honoured with an OBE for services to the furniture industry and to charity in the 2010 New Year Honours.

Wilkinson was a Founding Fellow of the Society of British Interior Design (SBID); a Fellow of the Royal Society for the encouragement of Arts, Manufactures and Commerce (FRSA); a Fellow of the Chartered Society of Designers (FCSD) and Fellow of the City and Guilds of London Institute (FCGI).

In 2010, Wilkinson was awarded the Medal of the Order of the League of Mercy Foundation (OLM) at a ceremony held at the Mansion House, in the City of London. The medal, awarded for his support of the specialist teaching charity Dyslexia Action, was presented by the chairman of the League of Mercy Foundation, and Knight Principal, Lord Lingfield.
