= Heidi Mottram =

British businesswoman

- Occupation: Chief executive of Northumbrian Water

Heidi Mottram CBE (born 1964 or 1965) is a British businesswoman and the chief executive of Northumbrian Water.

== Career ==
Mottram was born in Leeds, West Yorkshire, and gained a Bachelor of Science degree in geography at the University of Hull in 1986.

After graduating she hoped to study a postgraduate course which would have led to work as a National Park Ranger, but could not get a grant; when asked in 2010 "What's your ideal job, other than the one you've got?" she replied "National Park warden". She joined British Rail in 1986 as a management trainee and rose within the rail industry to become managing director of Northern Rail. In 2009 she was awarded the title of Rail Business Manager of the Year.

In the 2010 New Year Honours, she was awarded an OBE for services to the Rail Industry.

In April 2010, she joined Northumbrian Water as its chief executive, being the first woman to take the top post in a major British water company. She has said that her ambition is to make Northumbrian Water "the best water company in the UK on every count". In 2015, it was reported that her salary exceeded £1 million.

She was awarded an CBE in the 2018 Birthday Honours.

In January 2020, she was appointed to the board of Centrica as a non-executive director.

Mottram is also a non-executive director of Eurostar International and a board member of the North East Local Enterprise Partnership, the Kielder Water and Forest Park Development Trust and the Confederation of British Industry. She is a member of the Council of Newcastle University.

In her role as chief executive of Northumbrian Water, Mottram has received £5.25 million in pay since 2019.

== Personal life ==
Mottram enjoys climbing mountains as a hobby. When asked in 2010 to name the four people she would most like to dine with she chose Marie Curie, Eric Morecambe, Bill Clinton and Tenzing Norgay (the sherpa who accompanied Edmund Hillary in the first ascent of Mount Everest).

Mottram is a patron of Northumbria Blood Bikes, a volunteer-led charity transporting urgent medical supplies for the NHS.
