= Lurline Champagnie =

British politician

Lurline Champagnie OBE, (born 1935/1936 in Jamaica), is a British politician who became the first black woman to stand as a parliamentary candidate for the Conservative Party in the 1992 general election, losing to future Labour Party leader, Jeremy Corbyn. She was a Mayor in the London Borough of Harrow, and a councillor for the Pinner ward, being the first black person to hold these positions.

== Biography ==
Born in Jamaica, Champagnie emigrated to Britain in 1956. She was first employed in London as a punch operator. She trained as a nurse at Mount Vernon Hospital, including time in the burns and plastic surgery unit. After travelling to the US on a scholarship in 1964, she became aware of the possible supports available for women after mastectomies. She worked for a prosthesis supplier, and then ran her own business catering for post-mastectomy patients.

She began her political career at the 1982 Tory party conference declaring: "I am Conservative, black and British, and I'm proud of all three", for which she received a standing ovation. At the 1984 Tory party conference, Champagnie was caught up in the Brighton bombing, and as a trained nurse, was able to administer help to the victims.

In 1986, she was elected as a councillor for the ward of Pinner, thus becoming the first black councillor in the London Borough of Harrow. She represented Pinner until 2010. In 1992, when Champagnie stood for election to Parliament in Islington North, she became the first black woman to stand as a parliamentary candidate for the Conservatives. In 2004, Champagnie became the first black Mayor of Harrow, and in 2005 was runner-up in Britain's "Mayor of the Year Award".

In 2008, Champagnie became part of the Government Equalities Office cross-party task force in aid of black, Asian and minority ethnic (BAME) women.

In December 2009, Champagnie was appointed an OBE in the Queen's 2010 New Year Honours list.

== Personal life ==
Champagnie and her husband Clive have three sons.

== See also ==
- British African-Caribbean people
