= Mota Singh =

British judge

- Born: 26 July 1930; Nairobi, Kenya
- Died: 13 November 2016 (aged 86); Tooting, London
- Spouse: Swaran Kaur

Sir Mota Singh, QC (26 July 1930 – 13 November 2016) was a British judge who was noted for being the United Kingdom's first Asian judge.

== Biography ==
Singh was born in 1930 in Nairobi, Kenya. He was the eldest of six siblings.

After a short stint as a clerk at the East African Railways and Harbours, he joined a European firm of lawyers in Nairobi. He was married meanwhile to Swaran Kaur in 1950 and a daughter was born a year later. He continued his Bar studies. In 1953, Singh accompanied by his wife and daughter went to England. After passing the Bar final examinations in 1955, he returned to Kenya in 1956, to start his own practice as a barrister in Nairobi. He also entered politics and was elected a City Councillor and then elevated to the position of alderman of the City of Nairobi. He went on to hold many responsible positions before he decided in 1965 to emigrate to England. He joined the English bar in 1967 and made headlines with his appointment to the bench in 1982, the first from a minority ethnic group and first judge to sit on the English Bench wearing a turban instead of a horse-hair wig.

Singh retired from the Bench in 2002.

== Personal life ==
Singh was a teetotaller and vegetarian.

== Honours ==
In 2010, Singh was knighted by the Queen for his services to the judiciary and for his charitable works.
