= Margaret MacLean =

British pulmonary pharmacologist

- Mandy MacLean
- Education: PhD in Pharmacology from the University of Edinburgh - 1985
- Awards: MBE - 2010 Fellow of The Royal Society of Edinburgh (FRSE) - 2013 British Pharmacological Society AstraZeneca Prize for Women in Pharmacology - 2013
- Scientific career
- Fields: Pulmonary pharmacology
- Workplaces: University of Strathclyde, Glasgow

Margaret (Mandy) MacLean MBE FRSE is an expert in pulmonary pharmacology. She is renowned for her work on the role of sex effects and serotonin in metabolising oestrogen, also for identifying target enzymes for the treatment of pulmonary arterial hypertension. MacLean is currently a professor of Pulmonary Pharmacology in the Strathclyde Institute of Pharmacy and Biomedical Sciences at the University of Strathclyde Glasgow. She was awarded an MBE in 2010, was elected Fellow of The Royal Society of Edinburgh in 2013, and received the British Pharmacological Society AstraZeneca Prize for Women in Pharmacology. She is a Fellow of the Academy of Medical Sciences (FMedSci) and was appointed Scottish Champion for the Academy of Medical Sciences for her efforts in science communication.

== Life ==
Margaret MacLean, known as Mandy, is an expert in pulmonary pharmacology. She studied pharmacology for her BS and PhD at the University of Edinburgh. She is renowned for her work on the role of sex effects and serotonin in metabolising oestrogen, also for identifying target enzymes for the treatment of pulmonary arterial hypertension. MacLean is currently a professor of Pulmonary Pharmacology in the Strathclyde Institute of Pharmacy and Biomedical Sciences at the University of Strathclyde Glasgow.

== Awards ==
MacLean won an award from the American Thoracic Society in 2008 and a Royal Society Wolfson Research Merit Award in 2010. She was awarded the MBE in the 2010 Queen's New Year Honours list.

In 2013, MacLean was elected Fellow of The Royal Society of Edinburgh (FRSE) and received the British Pharmacological Society AstraZeneca Prize for Women in Pharmacology. In 2018, she was made a Fellow of the Academy of Medical Sciences (FMedSci) and was appointed Scottish Champion for the Academy of Medical Sciences for her efforts in science communication. MacLean featured in the Royal Society of Edinburgh's 2019 Women in Science in Scotland exhibition, which celebrated some of Scotland's leading female scientists.
