= Society for Clinical Trials =

- Abbreviation: SCT
- Formation: September 1978
- Type: Professional society
- Members: Professionals from academia, government, and private industry
- President: Dixie Ecklund (2023-24)

The Society for Clinical Trials (SCT) is an American professional organization in Philadelphia, Pennsylvania dedicated to advancing the science and practice of clinical trials. Established in 1978, SCT is an international organization with a membership of hundreds of individuals from academia, industry, government, and non-profit organizations. The society promotes the development and dissemination of knowledge related to the design, conduct, analysis, interpretation, and reporting of clinical trials.

The leadership structure of the Society for Clinical Trials comprises a president who holds office for a one-year term. Currently, Dixie Ecklund is serving as the president for the term of 2023-24.

== History ==
The Society for Clinical Trials was formally established in September 1978 with the objective of advancing and facilitating the development and exchange of knowledge pertaining to the design and execution of clinical trials and research utilizing comparable methodologies. Commemorating its 40th anniversary, the society marked this significant milestone during its annual meeting held in New Orleans from May 19 to May 22, 2019.

== David Sackett Trial of the Year Award ==
This award is given out each year to the randomized clinical trial that was published in the previous year and most effectively meets the following criteria: it contributes to the betterment of humanity, serves as the foundation for a significant and positive transformation in healthcare, showcases expertise in the respective subject matter, demonstrates excellence in methodology, prioritizes the well-being of study participants, and successfully overcomes challenges in implementation.

== Presidents ==
- Dixie Ecklund (2023-24)
- Lehana Thabane (2022-2023)
- Mithat Gönen (2021-2022)
- Susan Halabi (2020-2021)
- Dean Fergusson (2019-2020)
- Sumithra Mandrekar (2018-2019)
- Ted Karrison (2017-2018)
- Domenic Reda (2016-2017)
- Wendy Parulekar (2015-2016)
- KyungMann Kim (2014-2015)
