= Kirsten Aschengreen Piacenti =

Danish art historian (1929–2021)

- Born: 29 March 1929
- Died: 9 April 2021 (aged 92)
- Education: Courtauld Institute of Art; University of Florence
- Occupations: Art historian and museum director
- Employer: Palazzo Pitti; Stibbert Museum
- Awards: Order of Dannebrog (1995); Royal Victorian Order (2010)

Kirsten Aschengreen Piacenti (29 March 1929 – 9 April 2021) was a Danish art historian and museum director.

Piacenti studied at the Courtauld Institute of Art, where she graduated with a bachelor's degree in 1951, and a master's degree in 1953, and eventually graduated with a doctor degree from the University of Florence in 1966. She was assigned with Museo degli Argenti at Palazzo Pitti in Florence from 1971. From 1996 she was appointed director of the Stibbert Museum in Florence.

She was decorated Knight of the Order of Dannebrog in 1995, and Lieutenant of the Royal Victorian Order in 2010.

== 1966 Florence flood involvement ==
Kirsten Aschengreen Piacenti (1929–2021) was a Danish art historian and museum director who, in the aftermath of the 1966 Florence flood, joined the broader community of scholars and cultural professionals committed to safeguarding Florence's artistic heritage. Originally trained at the Courtauld Institute of Art and later earning a doctorate from the University of Florence in 1966, she was living and working in Tuscany when the flood struck and became engaged with local efforts to protect vulnerable collections as museums and institutions reorganised and recovered from the disaster.

After the flood, Piacenti played an active role in preserving and cataloguing damaged artworks and objects. She went on to lead major Florentine cultural institutions, including serving as director of the Museo degli Argenti (Treasury of the Grand Dukes) from 1974 to 1996 and later the Stibbert Museum until 2012.

Her career combined scholarship and hands-on preservation, and she helped establish and curate new museum spaces such as the Porcelain Museum and the Costume Gallery at Palazzo Pitti—initiatives reflecting both conservation and display priorities shaped, in part, by the heightened awareness of heritage protection that followed the flood.
