= Robin Gill (businessman) =

British businessman and investor (1927–2026)

Sir Robin Denys Gill, KCVO (7 October 1927 – 26 May 2026) was a British businessman, investor, and television and charity executive.

== Life and career ==
Born on 7 October 1927, Gill attended Brasenose College, Oxford. He worked at Unilever for five years before spending another five at British International Paper Ltd. In 1960, he then founded Border TV and was its managing director; in 1964, he moved to the Associated Television Corporation to be its managing director, serving until 1969. In the meantime, he was Chairman of ITCA (1966–67) and then ITN (1968–69). Between 1970 and 1993, he was chairman of the 1970 Trust Ltd. He founded the Trust with £500,000 capital as a "small free enterprise industrial reorganisation corporation", according to The Banker; The Times reported that "it is intended to build up investments in selected companies in service fields rather than in manufacturing". Gill was also chairman of Ansvar Insurance from 1975 to 1998. He was involved with several private equity funds and has held directorships in a range of companies.

In 1990, Gill founded the Royal Anniversary Trust, which was established to organise national celebrations to mark the 40th anniversary of Elizabeth II's accession in 1992. Among the Trust's other stated aims were "to promote industry and commerce and the advancement of education". He subsequently served as its Chairman of Executive (1990–2010) and Chairman (2002–10). In 1993, the remaining Trust's remaining funds were used to create The Queen's Anniversary Prizes for Higher and Further Education, of which Gill was also Chairman until 2010.

In 1993, Gill was appointed a Commander of the Royal Victorian Order for his work with the Royal Anniversary Trust. On retiring as chairman in 2010, he was promoted to Knight Commander.

Gill died on 26 May 2026, at the age of 98.
