= Alan Alexander (political scientist) =

Scottish academic (born 1943)

Alan Alexander OBE FRSE FAcSS
- Born: 13 December 1943 (age 82)

Academic background
- Education: University of Glasgow

Academic work
- Discipline: Public administration
- Institutions: Lakehead University; University of Reading; University of Strathclyde

Alan Alexander OBE FRSE FAcSS (born 13 December 1943) is a Scottish academic, writer and public servant. He was General Secretary of the Royal Society of Edinburgh 2013 -2018.

== Early life and academic career ==
Alan Alexander was born in Glasgow on 13 December 1943 and graduated in 1965 from the University of Glasgow with a master's degree in politics and modern history.

From 1966 until 1971, he was lecturer and, from 1969, assistant professor, in political science at Lakehead University, Thunder Bay, Ontario. He moved to the University of Reading as a visiting fellow in 1970 and was appointed lecturer in politics there in 1971. In 1986, he was a Fulbright Visiting Professor at Randolph-Macon Woman’s College, Virginia. In 1987, he was appointed to the Chair of Management in Local Government and as founding director the Scottish Local Authorities Management Centre at the University of Strathclyde Business School. From 1993 to 1996 he was Head of the Department of Human Resource Management. He retired from the university in 2000 and was immediately awarded the title of Emeritus Professor. His research interests included the structure and history of local government, management change in local authorities, and the role of the local authority chief executive. He was an early analyst of the effect on local services of the fragmentation of service delivery through the creation of single purpose bodies and the outsourcing of services.

== Public service ==
Alexander was a member of Reading County Borough Council from 1972 to 1974 and of Berkshire County Council from 1973 to 1977. He was on the Board of the Housing Corporation 1977–1980, of the Economic and Social Research Council 2003–2009, and of the Accounts Commission for Scotland, 2002–2008. From 2008 to 2009, he served as chair as Postwatch Scotland. From 1999 to 2002 he was Chairman of West of Scotland Water Authority and from 2002 to 2006 he was Chair of Scottish Water, a post from which he resigned after a major disagreement with Scottish Ministers about the content of the delivery plan for the company's capital programme. In 1991, Alexander conducted an independent inquiry into the large losses incurred by Western Isles Council (Comhairle nan Eilean Siar) as a result of the collapse of the Bank of Credit and Commerce International. In 2009 he chaired a review, sponsored jointly by Research Councils UK and Universities UK, of the operation of Full Economic Costing of Research in UK universities. From 2016 to 2021 he was Chair of the Advisory Council of the University of St Andrews Management School.

From 2013 to 2018, he was General Secretary of the Royal Society of Edinburgh, of which he has been a Fellow since 2003. He was elected a Fellow of the Academy of Social Science in 2015. In October 2018 Alexander was appointed to the Board of Audit Scotland as an independent non-executive member. He was Chair of the Audit Scotland Board, 2020-2024.

Alexander was appointed an Officer of the Order of the British Empire (OBE) in the New Year Honours List, 2010.

== Publications ==
=== Academic works ===
- Local Government in Britain since Reorganisation, George Allen & Unwin, New Local Government Series, 1982
- The Politics of Local Government in the United Kingdom, Longman, Politics Today Series, 1982
- L'amministrazione locale in Gran Bretagna, CEDAM, Padova, 1984 (Italian translation, revised and updated, of Local Government in Britain Since Reorganisation.)
- Borough Government and Politics: Reading 1835–1985, George Allen & Unwin, 1985
- Managing the Fragmented Authority, Local Government Management Board, 1994 (with Kevin Orr)
- The Future of DLOs/DSOs in Scotland, ADLO, 1998

=== Fiction ===
- By All Means, Amazon e-book, 2014
- Bloody Royals. Amazon e-book, 2015
- Twin Track to Death, Amazon e-book, 2016
- Flightpath, Amazon, Amazon e-book, 2017
