= William Robert Baxter =

British hospitality entrepreneur

William Robert Baxter CBE (born August 1960 in Inverness, Scotland - died 16 October 2023) was a British foodservice and hospitality entrepreneur. Baxter was a leading figure of the industry for over 30 years, retiring from commercial life in 2011, continuing to serve the sector as Chairman of Hospitality Action from 2010. Baxter was also Chairman of the Scannappeal, a charity which raises funds to purchase life saving medical equipment for hospitals in Buckinghamshire.

== Life ==
Baxter was the son of Ron Baxter, a civil engineer, who attended the University of Cambridge and was Chairman of Halcrow and Gillian Baxter. Baxter spent his early life in Scotland and Mid-Wales, until he was eight, when his family moved to Harrow-on-the-Hill, Middlesex. Baxter was a pupil at Friends' School Saffron Walden from 1971-76. Although he was dyslexic, Baxter obtained sufficient A Levels and was offered places at university to study architecture, but instead decided to choose a career in hospitality, after realising that “Seven years looked like a long time. I bottled out". Between 1979 and 1982, Baxter achieved a Higher National Diploma Hotel and Catering Industry Institutional Management at City of Westminster College

Baxter met his wife whilst studying at Westminster College and they have 3 sons and 1 daughter.

== Career ==
Baxter began his career in 1978, working at the Selfridge Hotel. In 1982, Baxter joined Sutcliffe Catering, and rising to become one of their youngest ever Area Managers. He left in 1987 to set up his first contract catering operation, Baxter and Platts which he co-founded with Rob Platts. He sold this business to Granada in 1997 and staying with the company until 1999 as Executive Chairman. In 2000 Baxter launched his next contract catering venture, BaxterSmith, with Mike Smith which he merged with the then WSH to become BaxterStorey, taking on the role of Deputy Chief Executive until his retirement in 2011.

Baxter retired from commercial life in 2011.
