= Bol d'Or =

Motorcycle endurance race

Coordinates: 46°51′48″N 3°09′57″E

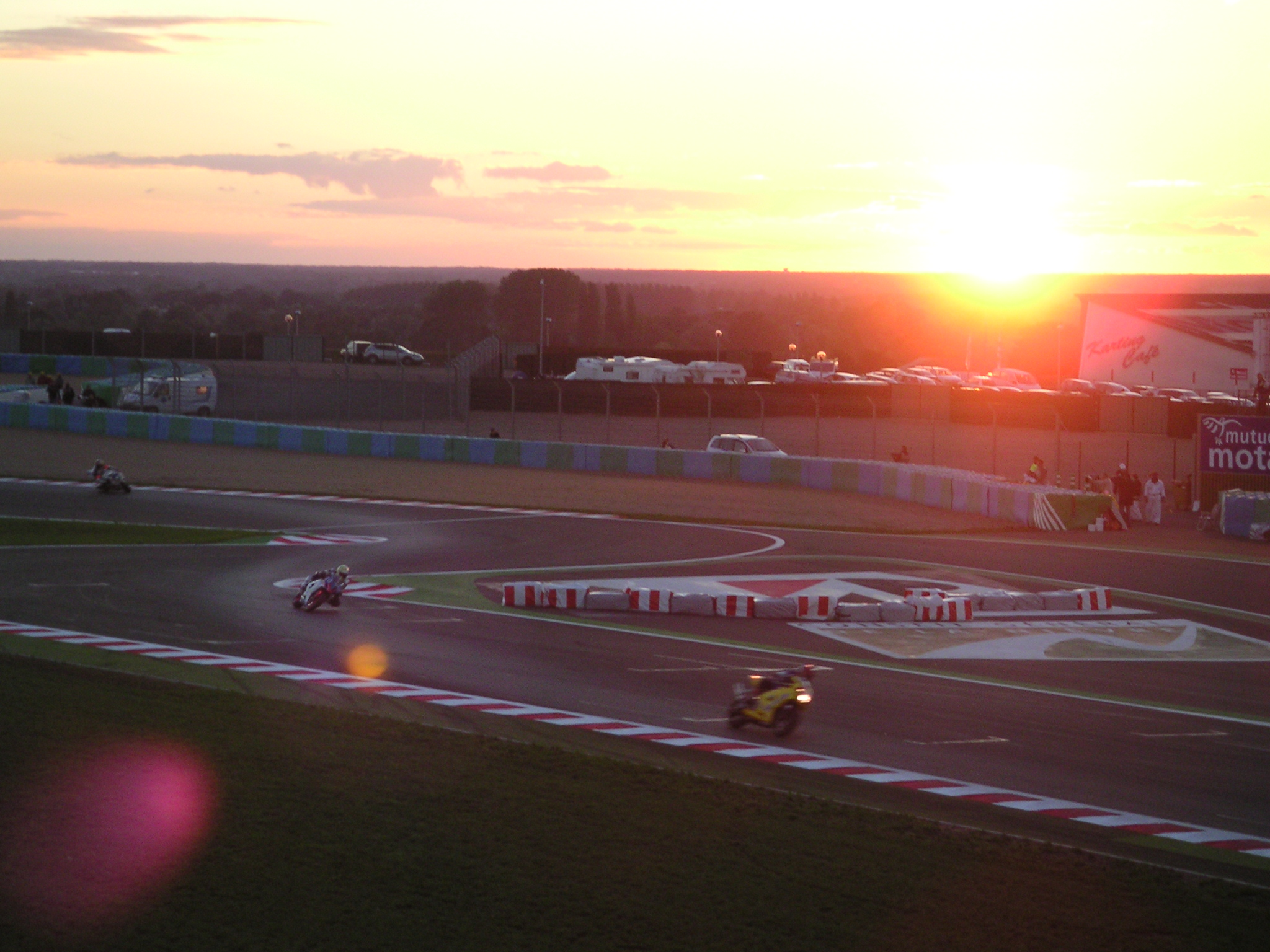
24 hours of endurance racing on a tough track: the 'Bol d’Or'

The Bol d’Or is a 24-hour endurance race for motorcycles, held annually in France. The race is part of the FIM Endurance World Championship. The riding of each bike is now shared by a team of three riders.

== History ==
The Bol d’Or, first organized by Eugene Mauve, in 1922, was a race for motorcycles, and automobiles limited to 1100cc engine capacity (in the 1950s the limit was raised to 1500cc, and later to 2000cc). Today, the Bol d’Or is exclusively a race for motorcycles, although there are a number of side "attractions", such as races for amateur riders and for classic bikes.

Prior to 1953 only one rider per machine was permitted. The record holder with seven victories, Frenchman Gustave Lefèvre, won with an average speed of 107 kilometers/hour riding his Norton Manx for the whole 24 hours. From 1954 to 1977 the teams comprised two riders, and then, in the interests of safety, this was increased to three.

Until 1970 the race was held at various circuits, mainly Linas-Montlhéry and Saint-Germain-en-Laye. From 1971 to 1977 the Bol d’Or was held at the permanent Le Mans Bugatti circuit, which excludes the temporary street circuit section, exiting before the Tertre Rouge esses and rejoining at the Ford Chicane, excluding the section from the Tertre Rouge, Mulsanne, and Porsche Curves. For the next 22 years the event took place at Paul Ricard, after which it moved to Magny-Cours. When the race left Le Mans the 24 Heures du Mans was established, so that when the Bol d'Or returned to Le Mans, there were for a time two annual 24-hour motorcycle endurance events on the Bugatti circuit. Until 2015, the Bol d’Or was held in the spring, while the 24 Heures du Mans was in the early September slot formerly used by the Bol d’Or. In 2016 things changed again: the "24 Heures du Mans" moved to the spring, while the Bol d’Or moved to Circuit Paul Ricard In September.

24-hour motorcycle endurance racing has a strong Francophone base, with the three main events held in France (Le Mans & Magny-Cours) and French-speaking Belgium (Spa-Francorchamps), and the most successful teams and riders are French. In 1970, 1971 and 1992 all-British teams of riders won the races. British rider Terry Rymer has had consistent results. In the 1970s the competitors included Phil Read and Neil Tuxworth, who later headed Honda Racing UK. On occasion, the Mead & Tomkinson racing team fielded "Nessie", a revolutionary bike with hub-center steering.

== Circuits ==
- 1922: clay track located in Vaujours, Clichy-sous-Bois and Livry-Gargan, 5.126 km (3.185 mi) long.
- 1923–1936: Loges track in Saint-Germain-en-Laye
- 1927: Fontainebleau
- 1937–1939: Linas-Montlhéry
- 1938–1946: No race
- 1947–1948: Saint-Germain-en-Laye
- 1949–1950: Linas-Montlhéry
- 1951: Saint-Germain-en-Laye
- 1952–1960: Linas-Montlhéry
- 1961–1968: No race
- 1969–1970: Linas-Montlhéry
- 1971–1977: Le Mans
- 1978–1999: Paul Ricard
- 2000–2014: Magny-Cours
- 2015–2019, 2021–present: Paul Ricard

The race is part of the Endurance FIM World Championship. The 2016 edition was the 80th edition of the race.

The race is accompanied by a motorcycle rally, carnival and other motorcycle related events.

== Results ==
	Rider 1	Rider 2	Rider 3	Manufacturer
1922	(Switzerland) Tony Zind	-	-	Motosacoche
1923	(Switzerland) Tony Zind	-	-	Motosacoche
1924	(France) René Francisquet	-	-	Sunbeam
1925	(France) René Francisquet	-	-	Sunbeam
1926	(France) Damitio	-	-	Sunbeam
1927	(Belgium) Lempereur	-	-	FN Herstal
1928	(Belgium) Victor Vroonen	-	-	Gillet Herstal
1929	(Belgium) Victor Vroonen	-	-	Gillet Herstal
1930	(France) Paul Debaisieux	-	-	Monet-Goyon
1931	(France) Patural	-	-	Velocette
1932	(France) Louis Jeannin	-	-	Jonghi
1933	(France) René Boura	-	-	Velocette
1934	(France) Willing	-	-	Velocette
1935	(France) René Boura	-	-	Norton
1936	(Belgium) Edgar Craët	-	-	Gillet Herstal
1937	(France) Tabart	-	-	Norton
1938	(France) Robert Tinoco	-	-	Harley-Davidson
1939	(France) Edouard Hordelalay	-	-	Motobécane
1940 - 1946: not held - World War II
1947	(France) Gustave Lefèvre	-	-	Norton
1948	(France) Jacques Lenglet	-	-	BMW
1949	(France) Gustave Lefèvre	-	-	Norton
1950	(France) Gustave Lefèvre	-	-	Norton
1951	(France) Gustave Lefèvre	-	-	Norton Manx
1952	(France) Pierre Collignon	-	-	Moto Guzzi
1953	(France) Gustave Lefèvre	-	-	Norton
1954	(Austria) Johann Weingartmann	(Austria) Helmut Volzwinkler	-	Puch
1955	(Czech Republic) Oldrich Hameršmid	(Czech Republic) Saša Klimt	-	Jawa
1956	(France) Gustave Lefèvre	(France) Georges Briand	-	Norton
1957	(France) Gustave Lefèvre	(France) Georges Briand	-	Norton
1958	(France) Inizan	(France) Mutel	-	Triumph Engineering
1959	(France) Jean-Claude Bargetzi	(France) Georges Briand	-	Norton
1960	(France) René Maucherat	(France) René Vasseur	-	BMW
1961 - 1968: Not held
1969	(France) Michel Rougerie	(France) Daniel Urdich		Honda
1970	(United Kingdom) Tom Dickie	(United Kingdom) Paul Smart	-	Triumph Trident
1971	(United Kingdom) Percy Tait	(United Kingdom) Ray Pickrell	-	Triumph Engineering
1972	(France) Gérard Debrock	(France) Roger Ruiz	-	Honda
1973	(France) Gérard Debrock	(France) Thierry Tchernine	-	Honda
1974	(France) Alain Genoud	(France) Georges Godier	-	Kawasaki
1975	(France) Alain Genoud	(France) Georges Godier	-	Kawasaki
1976	(United Kingdom) Alex George	(France) Jean-Claude Chemarin	-	Honda
1977	(France) Christian Léon	(France) Jean-Claude Chemarin	-	Honda
1978	(France) Christian Léon	(France) Jean-Claude Chemarin	-	Honda
1979	(France) Christian Léon	(France) Jean-Claude Chemarin	-	Honda
1980	(France) Pierre-Étienne Samin	(France) Frank Gross	-	Suzuki
1981	(France) Dominique Sarron	(France) Jean-Claude Jaubert	-	Honda
1982	(France) Jean Lafond	(France) Hervé Guilleux	(France) Patrick Igoa	Kawasaki
1983	(France) Dominique Sarron	(France) Raymond Roche	(France) Guy Bertin	Honda
1984	(France) Jean-Pierre Oudin	(Belgium) Patrick de Radiguès	-	Suzuki
1985	(France) Alex Vieira	(France) Gérard Coudray	(France) Patrick Igoa	Honda
1986	(France) Dominique Sarron	(Switzerland) Pierre Bolle	(France) Jean-Louis Battistini	Honda
1987	(France) Dominique Sarron	(France) Jean-Michel Mattioli	(France) Jean-Louis Battistini	Honda
1988	(France) Alex Vieira	(France) Dominique Sarron	(France) Christophe Bouheben	Honda
1989	(France) Alex Vieira	(France) Jean-Michel Mattioli	(United Kingdom) Roger Burnett	Honda
1990	(France) Alex Vieira	(France) Jean-Michel Mattioli	(Belgium) Stéphane Mertens	Honda
1991	(France) Alex Vieira	(Canada) Miguel Duhamel	(France) Jean-Louis Battistini	Kawasaki
1992	(United Kingdom) Terry Rymer	(United Kingdom) Carl Fogarty	(United Kingdom) Steve Hislop	Kawasaki
1993	(France) Dominique Sarron	(France) Jean-Marc Deletang	(France) Bruno Bonhuil	Suzuki
1994	(France) Dominique Sarron	(France) Christian Sarron	(Japan) Yasutomo Nagai	Yamaha
1995	(United Kingdom) Terry Rymer	(France) Jean-Louis Battistini	(France) Jéhan D'Orgeix	Kawasaki
1996	(France) Alex Vieira	(France) William Costes	(France) Christian Lavieille	Honda
1997	(United Kingdom) Terry Rymer	(United Kingdom) Brian Morrison	(France) Jéhan D'Orgeix	Kawasaki
1998	(United Kingdom) Terry Rymer	(United Kingdom) Brian Morrison	(Australia) Peter Goddard	Suzuki
1999	(United Kingdom) Terry Rymer	(France) Jéhan D'Orgeix	(France) Christian Lavieille	Suzuki
2000	(France) Jean-Marc Deletang	(France) Fabien Foret	(Australia) Mark Willis	Yamaha
2001	(United Kingdom) Brian Morrison	(France) Christian Lavieille	(France) Laurent Brian	Suzuki
2002	(France) Jean-Michel Bayle	(France) Sébastien Gimbert	(France) Nicolas Dussauge	Suzuki
2003	(France) Jean-Michel Bayle	(France) Sébastien Gimbert	(France) Nicolas Dussauge	Suzuki
2004	(France) Vincent Philippe	(Japan) Keiichi Kitagawa	(France) Matthieu Lagrive	Suzuki
2005	(France) Vincent Philippe	(Japan) Keiichi Kitagawa	(France) Matthieu Lagrive	Suzuki
2006	(France) Vincent Philippe	(Japan) Keiichi Kitagawa	(France) Matthieu Lagrive	Suzuki
2007	(Spain) David Checa	(France) Sébastien Gimbert	(France) Olivier Four	Yamaha
2008	(France) Vincent Philippe	(France) Julien Da Costa	(France) Matthieu Lagrive	Suzuki
2009	(France) Vincent Philippe	(France) Freddy Foray	(France) Olivier Four	Suzuki
2010	(France) Vincent Philippe	(France) Guillaume Dietrich	(France) Freddy Foray	Suzuki
2011	(France) Vincent Philippe	(France) Freddy Foray	(France) Anthony Delhalle	Suzuki
2012	(France) Julien Da Costa	(France) Gregory Leblanc	(France) Olivier Four	Kawasaki
2013	(France) Jeremy Guarnoni	(France) Gregory Leblanc	(France) Loris Baz	Kawasaki
2014	(France) Gregory Leblanc	(France) Matthieu Lagrive	(France) Nicolas Salchaud	Kawasaki
2015	(France) Gregory Leblanc	(France) Matthieu Lagrive	(France) Fabien Foret	Kawasaki SRC
2016	(France) Anthony Delhalle	(France) Vincent Philippe	(France) Étienne Masson	Suzuki
2017	(Spain) David Checa	(Italy) Niccolò Canepa	(France) Mike Di Meglio	Yamaha
2018	(France) Freddy Foray	(Australia) Josh Hook	(France) Mike Di Meglio	Honda
2019	(France) Vincent Philippe	(France) Étienne Masson	(France) Gregg Black	Suzuki
2020: not held - COVID-19 pandemic
2021	(France) Gregg Black	(Belgium) Xavier Simeon	(France) Sylvain Guintoli	Suzuki
2022	(Germany) Florian Alt	(France) Erwan Nigon	(South Africa) Steven Odendaal	Yamaha
2023	(France) Gregg Black	(France) Sylvain Guintoli	(France) Etienne Masson	Suzuki
2024	(France) Gregg Black	(United Kingdom) Dan Linfoot	(France) Etienne Masson	Suzuki
2025	(France) Gregg Black	(United Kingdom) Dan Linfoot	(France) Etienne Masson	Suzuki
2026	(Germany) Markus Reiterberger	(South Africa) Steven Odendaal	(Netherlands) Michael van der Mark	BMW

Manufacturer	No. of Wins	Wins
(Japan) Suzuki	21	1980, 1984, 1993, 1998, 1999, 2001, 2002, 2003, 2004, 2005, 2006, 2008, 2009, 2010, 2011, 2016, 2019, 2021, 2023, 2024, 2025
(Japan) Honda	17	1969, 1972, 1973, 1976, 1977, 1978, 1979, 1981, 1983, 1985, 1986, 1987, 1988, 1989, 1990, 1996, 2018
(Japan) Kawasaki	11	1974, 1975, 1982, 1991, 1992, 1995, 1997, 2012, 2013, 2014, 2015
(United Kingdom) Norton	9	1935, 1937, 1947, 1949, 1950, 1953, 1956, 1957, 1959
(Japan) Yamaha	5	1994, 2000, 2007, 2017, 2022
(Belgium) Gillet Herstal	4	1927, 1928, 1929, 1936
(United Kingdom) Triumph	3	1958, 1970, 1971
(France) Velocette	3	1931, 1933, 1934
(United Kingdom) Sunbeam	3	1924, 1925, 1926
(Germany) BMW	3	1948, 1960, 2026
(Switzerland) Motosacoche	2	1922, 1923
(United States) Harley-Davidson	1	1938
(France) Monet-Goyon	1	1930
(France) Motobecane	1	1939
(Italy) Moto Guzzi	1	1952
(Czech Republic) Jawa	1	1955
(Austria) Puch	1	1954
(France) Jonghi	1	1932

== Side races ==
- La Tasse d'or (the golden cup), reserved for motorcycle of less than 50cc (known as the coffee cup: "tasses à café")
- Le Bol d’Or classic (the classic golden bowl): reserved for classic motorcycles
- Le Bol d'argent (the silver bowl): amateur competition taking place before main competition.
