= 2011 England riots =

6–11 August riots in cities and towns across England

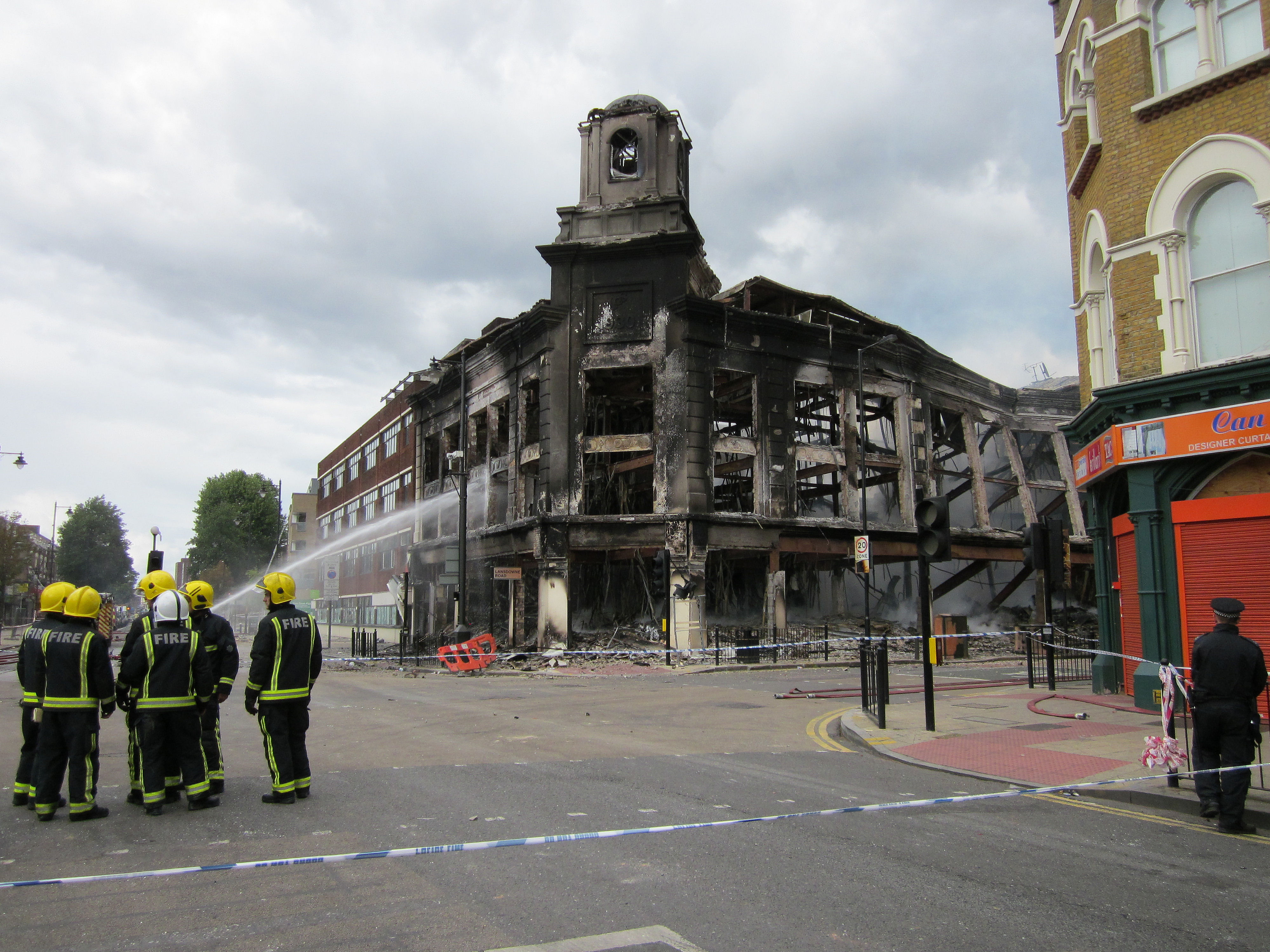
- Firefighters watering a shop and apartments destroyed by arson during the initial rioting in Tottenham
- Date: 6–11 August 2011 (copycat incidents continued after this period)
- Location: Several boroughs of London; West Midlands, Merseyside, East Midlands, Greater Manchester, Bristol and several other areas
- Methods: Rioting, looting, arson, robbery, assault, murder
- Result: Shops, homes, vehicles destroyed

Reported fatalities and injuries
- Deaths: 5
- Injuries: 205 (16 members of the public, 186 police officers, and 3 police community support officers)
- Arrested: 3,000+
- Damage: 2,815 homes, businesses attacked

A series of riots took place between the 6th and 11th of August 2011 in cities and towns across England, which saw looting and arson, as well as mass deployment of police and the deaths of five people.

The protests started in Tottenham Hale, London, following the killing of Mark Duggan, a local mixed-race man who was shot dead by police on the 4th of August. Several violent clashes with police followed Duggan's death, along with the destruction of police vehicles, a double-decker bus and many homes and businesses, which rapidly gained the attention of the media. Overnight, looting took place in Tottenham Hale retail park and in nearby Wood Green. The following days saw similar scenes in other parts of London, with the worst rioting taking place in Hackney, Brixton, Walthamstow, Wandsworth, Peckham, Enfield, Battersea, Croydon, Ealing, Barking, Woolwich, Lewisham and East Ham.

From the 8th to 11th of August, other towns and cities in England (including Birmingham, Bristol, Coventry, Derby, Leicester, Liverpool, Manchester and Nottingham) faced what was described by the media as "copycat violence", with social media playing a role. By 10 August, more than 3,000 arrests had been made across England, with at least 1,984 people facing criminal charges for various offences related to the riots. Initially, courts sat for extended hours. A total of 3,443 crimes across London were linked to the disorder. Along with the five deaths, at least 16 others were injured as a direct result of related violent acts. An estimated £200 million worth of property damage was incurred, and local economic activity – which in many cases was already struggling due to the Great Recession – was significantly compromised.

Significant debate was generated among political, social, and academic figures about the causes and context of the riots. Attributions for the rioters' behaviour included social factors such as racial tension, class tension, economic decline and its consequent unemployment.

== Police shooting of Mark Duggan ==
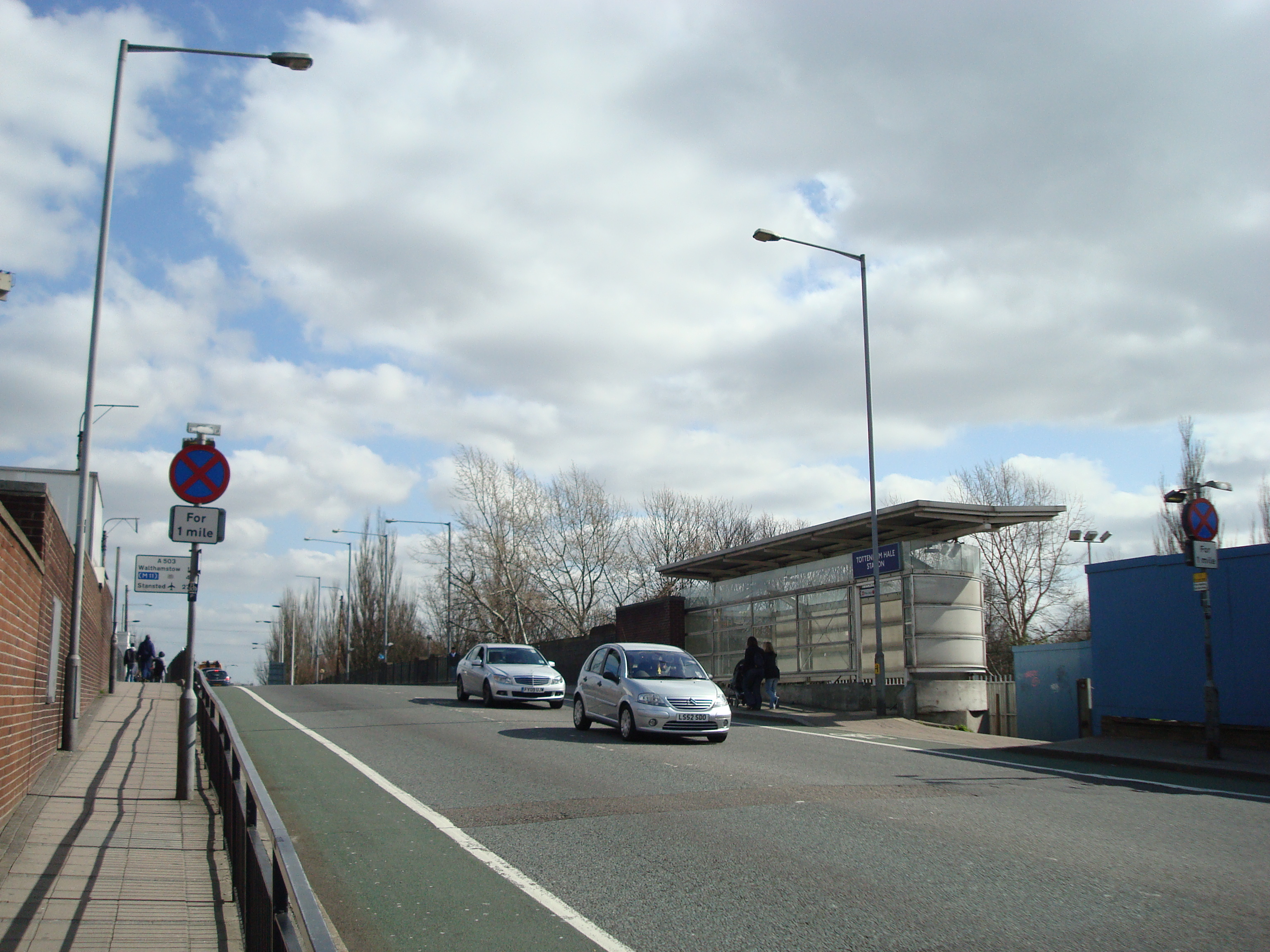
Ferry Lane, Tottenham Hale, location of the shooting

On 4 August 2011, a police officer shot dead 29-year-old Mark Duggan during an intelligence-led, targeted vehicle stop procedure on the Ferry Lane bridge next to Tottenham Hale station. The Independent Police Complaints Commission (IPCC, now replaced by the Independent Office for Police Conduct) said that the planned arrest was part of Operation Trident, which at that time investigated gun crime in the black community. The incident had been referred to the IPCC, which was standard practice if death or serious injury follows police contact.

Following the shooting, the media widely reported that a bullet was found embedded in a police radio, implying that Duggan fired on the police. Friends and relatives of Duggan said that he was unarmed. The police later revealed that initial ballistics tests on the bullet recovered from the police radio indicate that it was a "very distinct" police issue hollow-point bullet. The IPCC later stated that a loaded Bruni/BBM blank-firing pistol, converted to fire live ammunition, was recovered from the scene. It was wrapped in a sock, and there was no evidence that it had been fired.

On 13 August, the IPCC stated that Duggan did not open fire: "It seems possible that we may have verbally led journalists to [wrongly] believe that shots were exchanged." The bullet that had lodged in an officer's radio is believed to have been an overpenetration, having passed through Duggan's body.

At lunchtime on 6 August, a meeting was called by police between local community leaders, councillors and members of police advisory groups. In this meeting, police were warned several times that there could possibly be another riot similar to the Broadwater Farm riot of 1985 if local concerns regarding the death were not addressed.

On 8 January 2014, a coroner’s jury concluded that Duggan was lawfully killed. The verdict of lawful killing was upheld by the Court of Appeal in 2017.

=== Protest march ===
On 6 August, a protest was held, initially peacefully, beginning at Broadwater Farm and finishing at Tottenham police station. The protest was organised by friends and relatives of Duggan to "demand justice" for the family. The group of some 300 people demanded that a senior local police officer come out to speak to them. When Chief Inspector Ade Adelekan arrived, he was met with boos and cries of "murderer", "Uncle Tom" and "coconut". The crowd stayed in front of the police station hours longer than they originally planned because they were not satisfied with the seniority of the officers available at the time. Rumours that a 16-year-old girl had sustained injuries after attacking police with a champagne bottle began circulating on social media. The girl was never publicly identified, and the report was never confirmed. However, the rumour alone was sufficient to further fuel tensions in the area.

== Riots ==
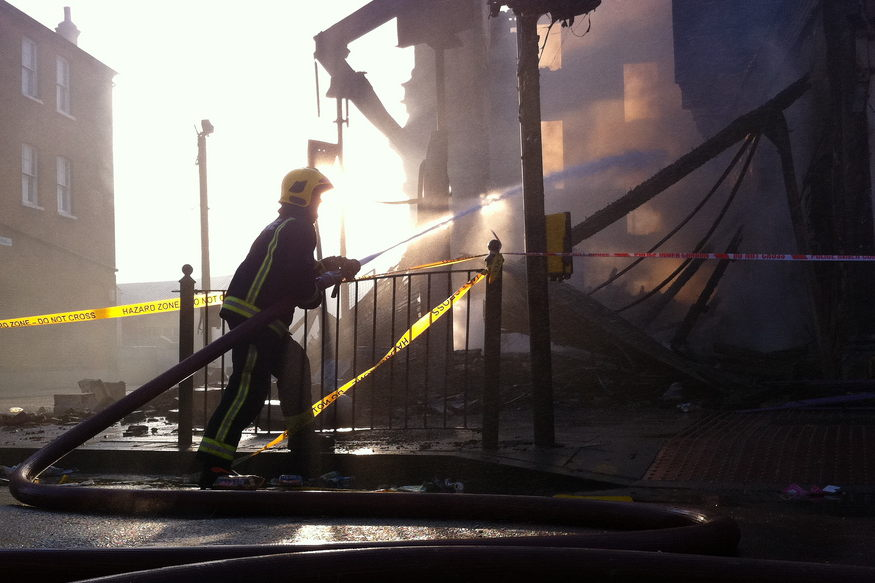
A firefighter douses a blaze in Tottenham during the aftermath of the initial riot.

The peaceful march on the morning of Saturday 6 August in Tottenham was followed by rioting and looting, first in Tottenham and later in Tottenham Hale Retail Park. Rioting occurred shortly after about 120 people marched from the Broadwater Farm estate to Tottenham Police Station via the High Road.

The spread of news and rumours about the previous evening's disturbances in Tottenham sparked riots during the night of Sunday 7 August in the London districts of Brixton, Enfield, Islington and Wood Green and in Oxford Circus in the centre of London.

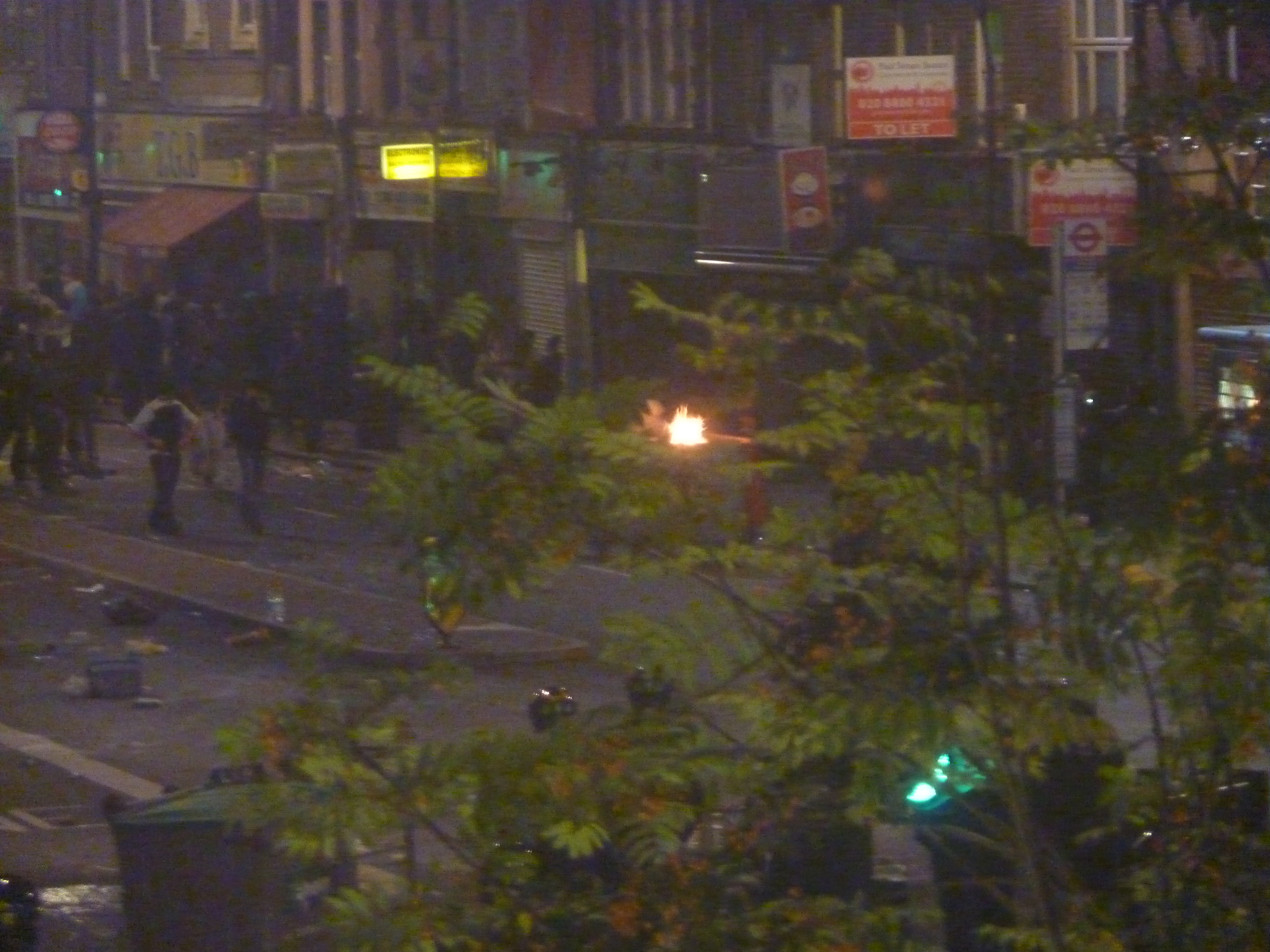
Rioters facing police on the evening of Saturday 6 August 2011

In the evening of Monday 8 August, many areas of London were affected by widespread looting, arson and violence. There were significant outbreaks in parts of Battersea, Brixton, Bromley, Camden, Croydon, Ealing, East Ham, Hackney, Harrow, Lewisham, Peckham, Stratford, Tower Hamlets, Waltham Forest, Wandsworth, Woolwich, and Wood Green. A man was found shot in Croydon and died later in hospital. Another man who had been assaulted in Ealing died in hospital on Thursday 11 August.

Similar riots were reported outside London – most notably in Birmingham, Manchester, Nottingham, Wolverhampton, Liverpool, and Bristol. There were reports of unrest on a smaller scale in other parts of the country, including Gillingham and Derby.

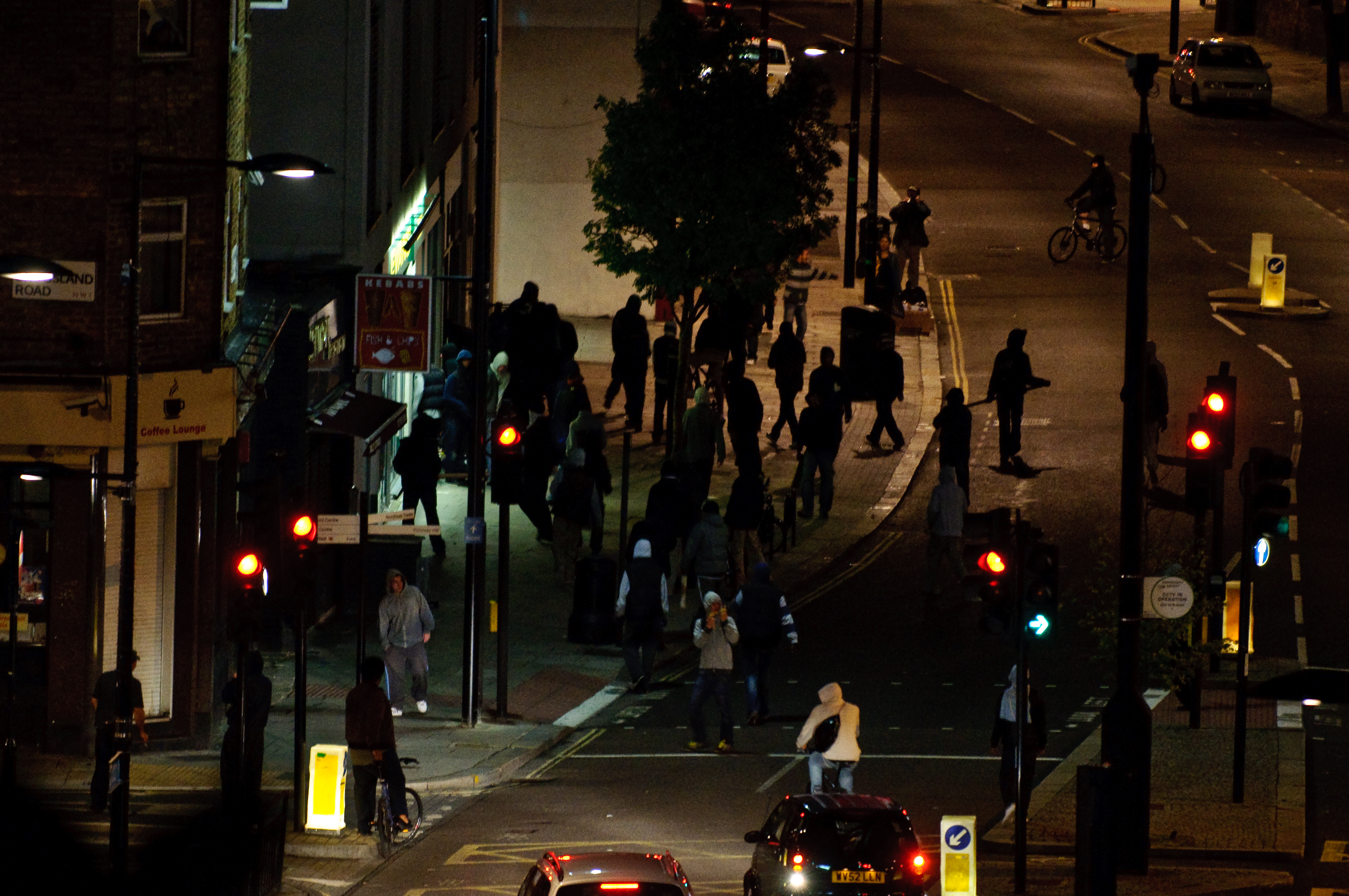
Rioters attempt to loot a cycle shop in Chalk Farm, Camden.

Following a greatly increased police presence, London was quiet on Tuesday 9 August, but rioting continued in Nottingham and Birmingham (where, according to the police account, 11 shots were fired at police, including at a police helicopter, and petrol bombs thrown at officers) and spread to Leicester, parts of the West Midlands and to parts of Greater Manchester and Merseyside in the north-west of England. On 10 August, London remained quiet while hundreds of arrests were being made by the police.

Three men were killed in Birmingham in a hit-and-run incident related to the disturbances. Looting and violence continued in two locations around Manchester and Liverpool.

== Social media ==
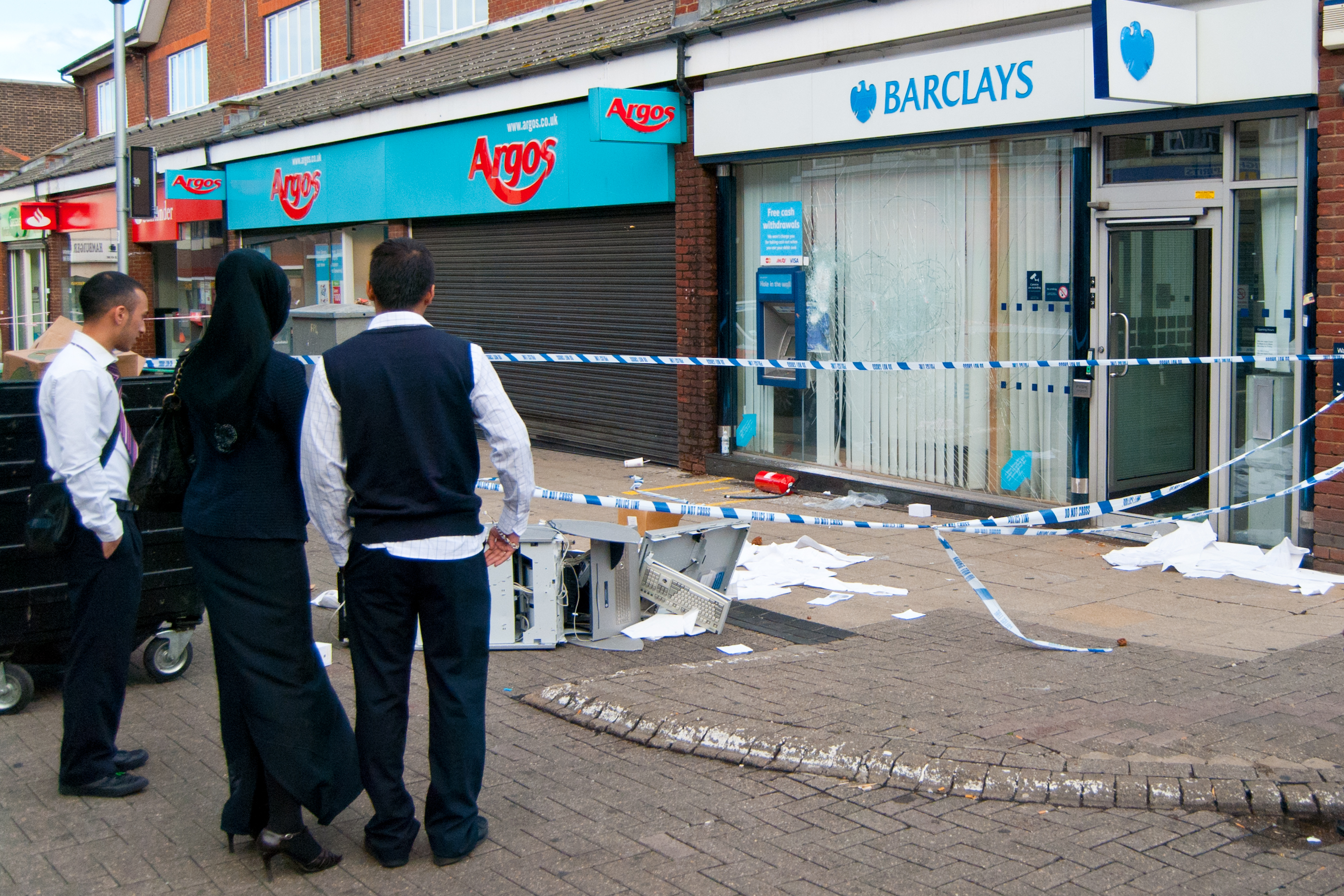
Bank workers in Walthamstow observe the destruction which was caused in the early hours of the morning.

The existence of social media made the 2011 riots unparalleled to any before them in terms of the speed at which issues managed to spread and at which rioters were able to mobilise and organise. Many used sites such as Facebook and Twitter to promote and advertise sites for looting and disorder. As a result, many online organisers were handed severe sentences for their roles in the violence.

Throughout the rioting, many of the rioters failed to cover their faces. Some posed for pictures with stolen goods, posting them on social networking sites.

Although London employs CCTV cameras to monitor crime and large events, reports indicate that citizen footage contributed more to capturing looters in action than the police force. Beyond the CCTV, looters were filmed and photographed with their faces visible. Police forces and investigators used websites like Flickr to find galleries of the looters to help solve and prevent cases of vandalism and further damage. Facebook pages were also created to identify looters.

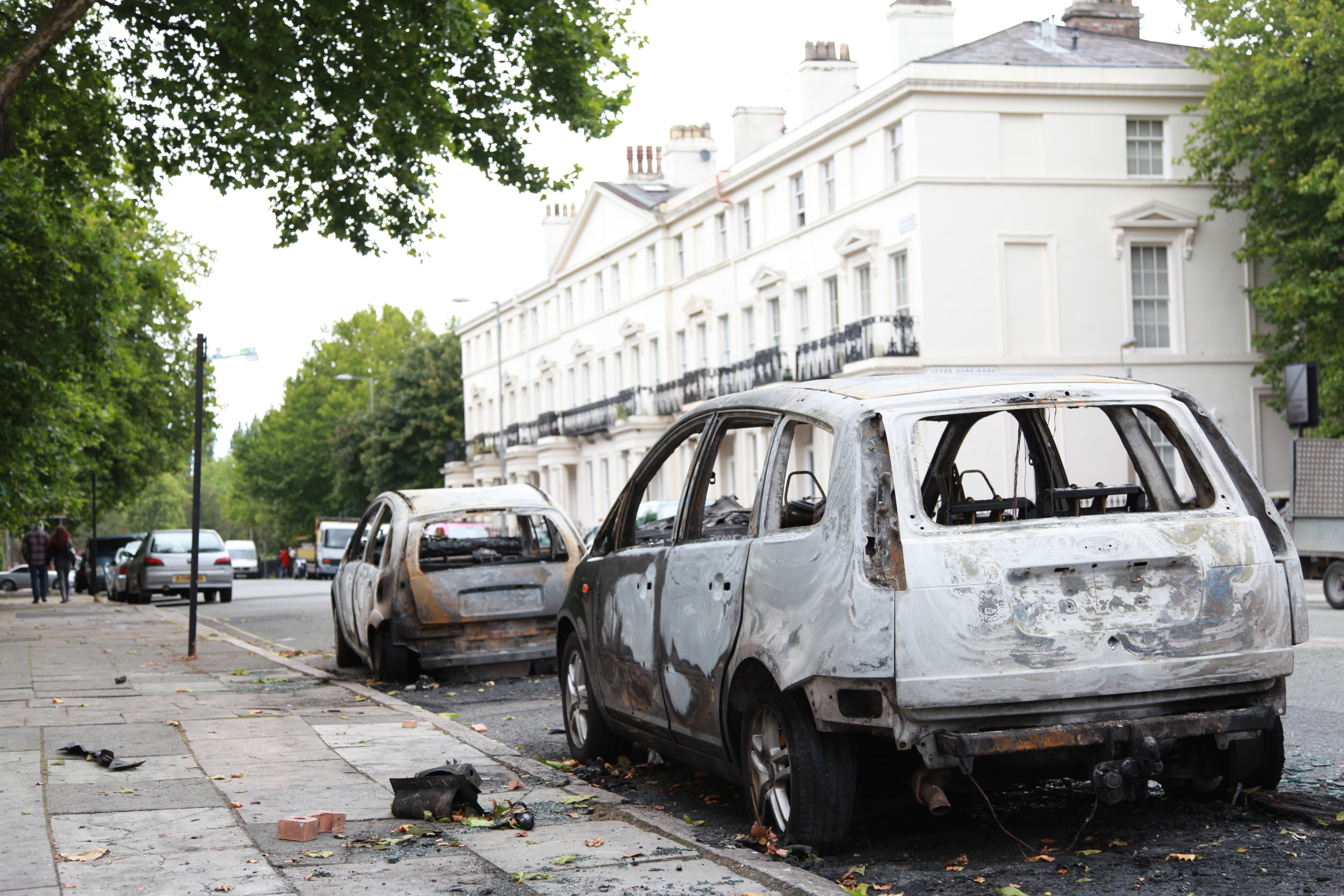
Burnt-out cars in Liverpool

Several interactive maps were implemented in the Google Maps website that showed satellite views of what was happening in the streets during the rioting. James Cridland, the managing director of the free media resources, created a Google Map that tracked verified locations of rioting. Channel 4 News had similar maps that progressively tracked the damage in the streets as well. The Guardian created both a map and a dataset of events of the riots News channels also were able to utilise this public service to capture live footage on the streets and inform citizens of dangerous or crowded areas.

=== BlackBerry Messenger ===
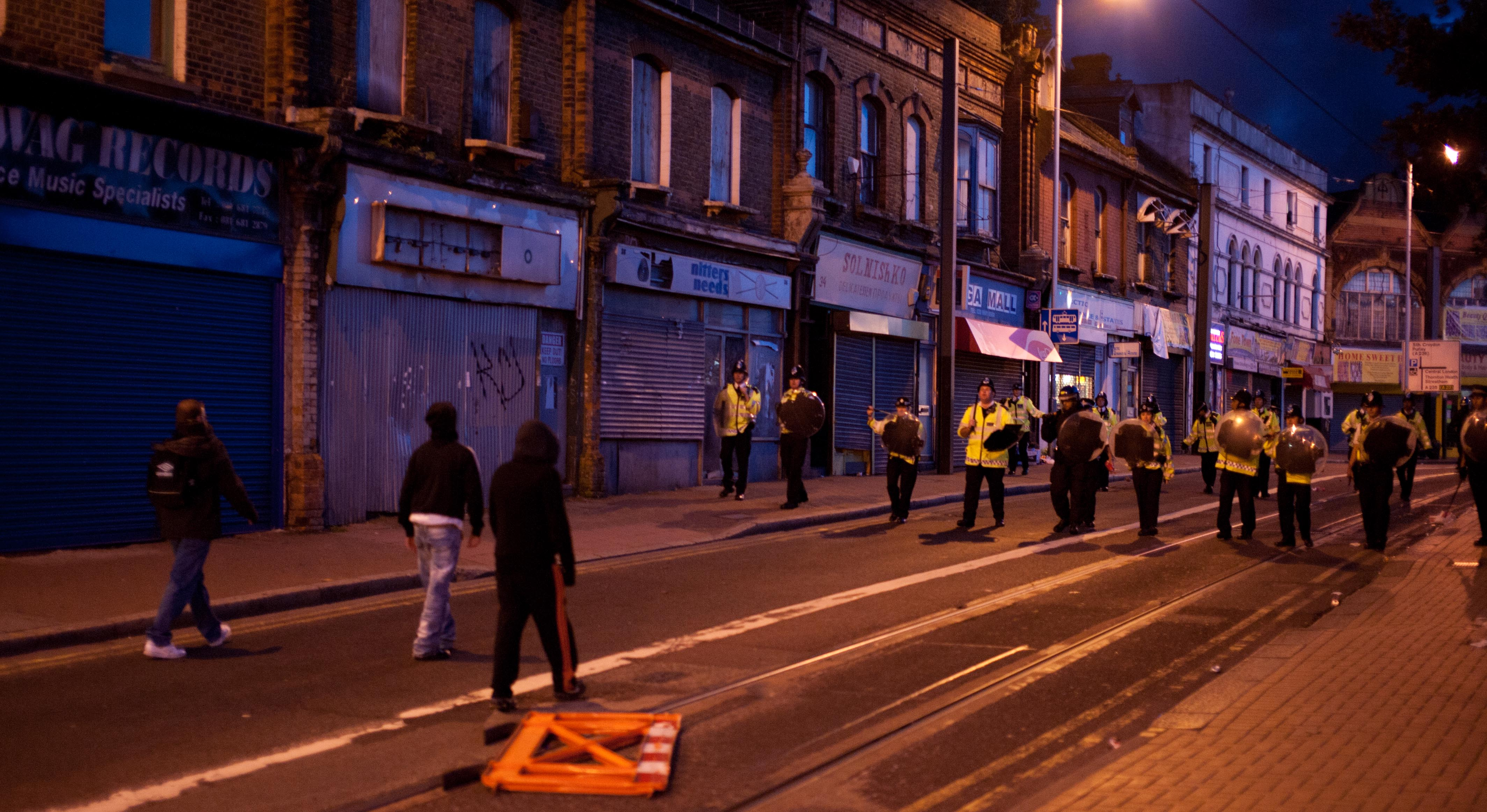
Stand-off between rioters and police in Croydon

There were reports that the BlackBerry Messenger (BBM) service was used by looters to organise their activities, and that inflammatory and inaccurate accounts of Mark Duggan's killing on social media sites may have incited disturbances. One of the many messages shared between users was the following:

"Everyone in edmonton enfield wood green everywhere in north link up at enfield town station at 4 o clock sharp!!!!," it began. "Start leaving ur yards n linking up with your niggas. Fuck da feds, bring your ballys and your bags trollys, cars vans, hammers the lot!!"

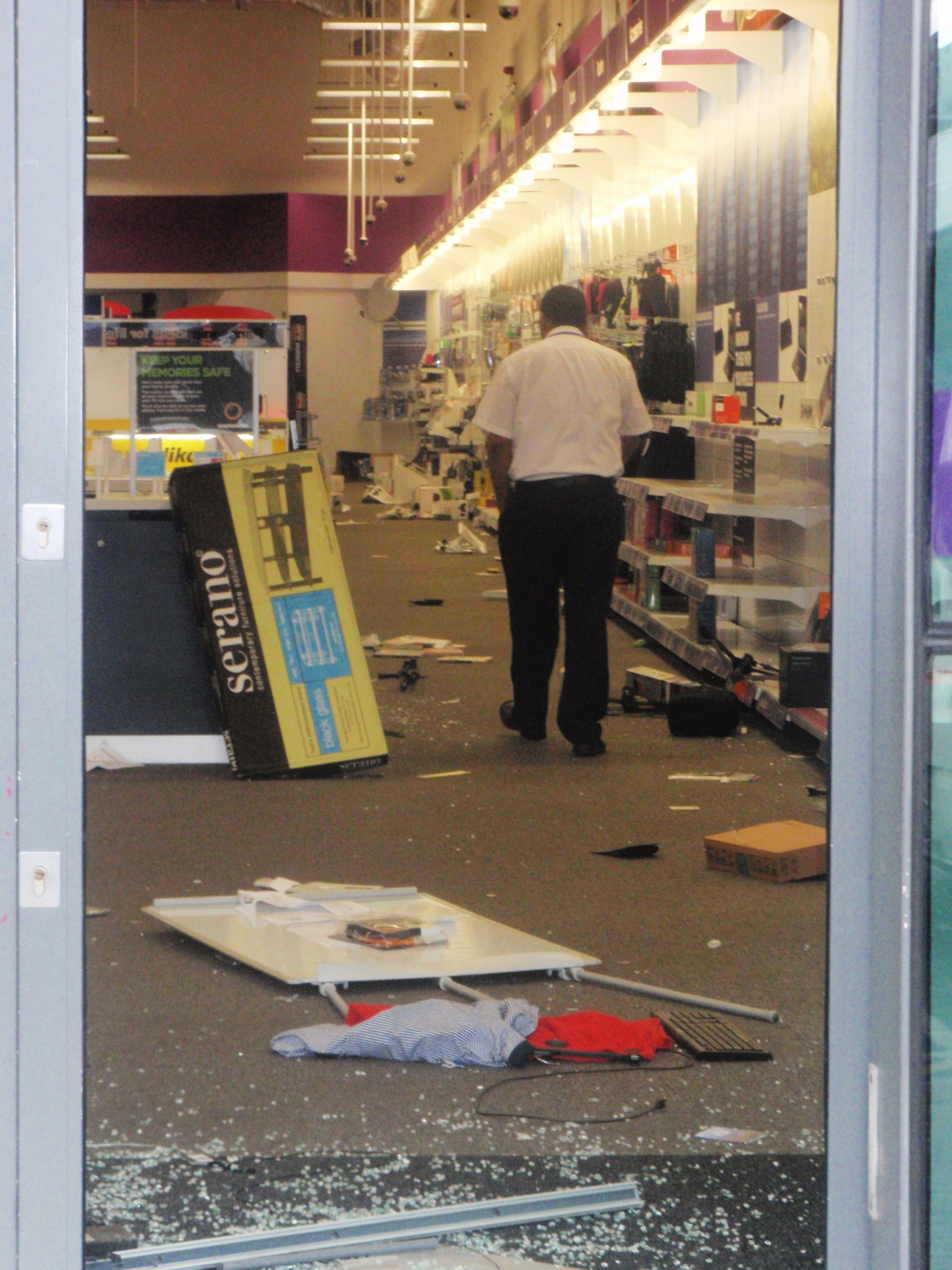
A shop in Tottenham Hale Retail park after the looting

Research in Motion assisted British police in tracking rioters who used BBM, stating, "We comply with the Regulation of Investigatory Powers Act and co-operate fully with the Home Office and UK police forces."

Increased connectivity among individuals led to a greater ability to organise and execute massive gatherings.

=== Twitter ===
Much like BBM, activity on social media shaped the London riots. During the Tottenham riots of 1985, citizens had to head into a public place to voice their message. Yet, with access to Twitter as a communication medium, social media was used to rapidly spread messages of the riots.

On Radio 4, a police official said social media was used to "organize [...] greed and criminality." The Daily Telegraph described Twitter as being an outlet for promoting gang violence. Evidence shows that Twitter is powerful because tweets of individuals were inspired by news content. However, an article in Time magazine suggested that BlackBerry Messenger was more to blame.

During the riots, Twitter accounted for two out of every 85 UK Internet visits on Monday 8 August. In addition, citizens also used Twitter to band together, after the destruction with hashtags including "#riotcleanup". Evidence shows that people were tweeting and re-tweeting news related to the riots, not original content.

=== Mobile phones ===
Other than BlackBerry Messenger and social networking sites, mobile phone operators T-Mobile and Orange prioritised police requests for information about the phones that were used to plan the riots that hit British cities. Under the Regulation of Investigatory Powers Act, phone companies were required to hand over data about the locations calls were made from, the owners of phones, and lists of calls made to and from a particular handset.

== Effects ==
A burnt-out building being doused with water. Built by the London Co-operative Society in 1930 as "Union Point", the building included a Carpetright on the ground floor and many Apartments on the upper storeys.

=== Deaths and injuries ===
==== Trevor Ellis ====
Trevor Ellis, a 26-year-old man from Brixton Hill was shot dead in Croydon, South London, on 8 August. His family denied reports that Ellis, who had come from the Brixton area to Croydon with a group of friends, had been involved in looting. 13 people were arrested in connection with the murder. All were later bailed and then released without action. On 16 December, the eve of Ellis's birthday, detectives opened up a fresh appeal into the murder, asking for witnesses to come forward.

==== Haroon Jahan, Shahzad Ali and Abdul Musavir ====
On 10 August, in Winson Green, Birmingham, three male employees of the automotive business owned by Amjad Hussain – Haroon Jahan, 21, and brothers Shahzad Ali, 30, and Abdul Musavir, 31 – who had joined a 40-strong community patrol were killed in a hit-and-run incident while attempting to protect a petrol station and shops from rioters and looters. On 19 April 2012, eight men, each indicted on three counts of murder, were tried at Birmingham Crown Court before Mr Justice Flaux; the jury acquitted all of the defendants on all charges and the judge said that the jury had concluded that the deaths had resulted from a "terrible accident".

==== Richard Mannington Bowes ====
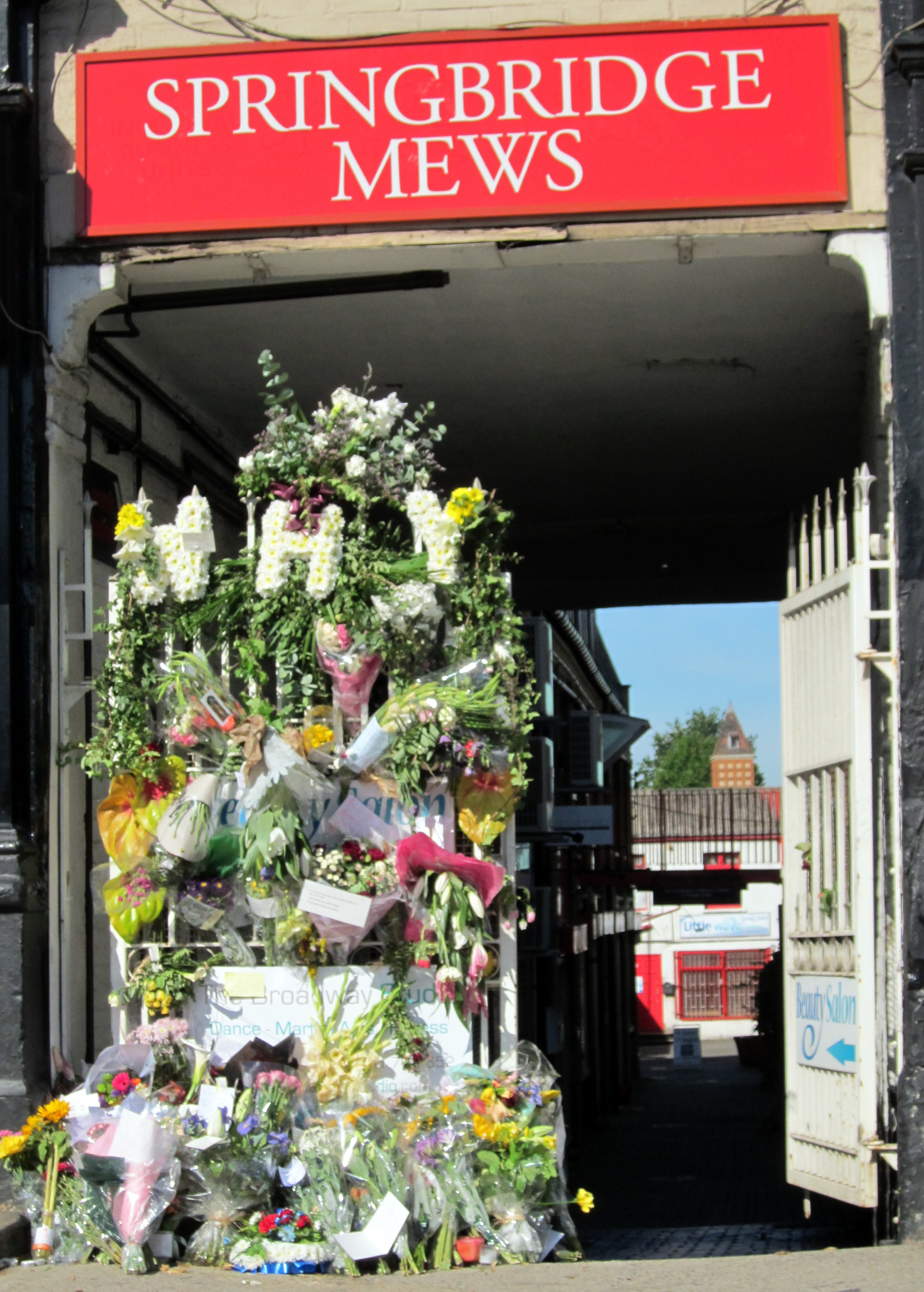
Floral tributes at the site of the fatal assault of Richard Mannington Bowes. The flowers at the top spell out the word "why".

A 68-year-old man, Richard Mannington Bowes, died on 11 August after he was attacked while attempting to stamp out a litter-bin fire in Ealing on the evening of 8 August.

The attacker inflicted severe head injuries which resulted in a coma. The assault was caught on CCTV and reportedly filmed on mobile phones by associates of the alleged assailant. The attack on Bowes was witnessed by several police officers, but due to the number of rioters they were unable to come to his aid until riot squad officers pushed back the rioters while being attacked to reach Bowes. A line of officers then held back the rioters as paramedics arrived. Bowes' wallet and phone had been stolen, and police faced difficulty in identifying him. He died of his injuries at St Mary's Hospital on 11 August 2011 after being removed from life support.

Many tributes were paid to Bowes, including Ealing Council, who flew the Union Flag at half-mast over its town hall and announced the launch of a relief fund in his name, and Mayor of London Boris Johnson, who described him as a hero.

16-year-old Darrell Desuze of Hounslow was charged with the murder of Bowes, violent disorder and four burglaries. He appeared at Croydon Magistrates' Court on 16 August 2011, where he was remanded in custody until his appearance at the Central Criminal Court on 18 August 2011. His 31-year-old mother, Lavinia Desuze, was charged with perverting the course of justice. On 12 March 2012 at the Inner London Crown Court, Darrel Desuze pleaded guilty to manslaughter, after previously pleading guilty to burglary and violent disorder. The following day the Crown withdrew the murder charge against him. After a trial at the Inner London Crown Court before Mr Justice Saunders and a jury, Lavinia Desuze was convicted of perverting the course of justice after she destroyed the clothing her son wore on the day of Bowes' death. On 17 April 2012, Mr Justice Saunders sentenced Darrell Desuze to detention for a term of eight years, and Lavinia Desuze to imprisonment for eighteen months.

==== Injuries ====
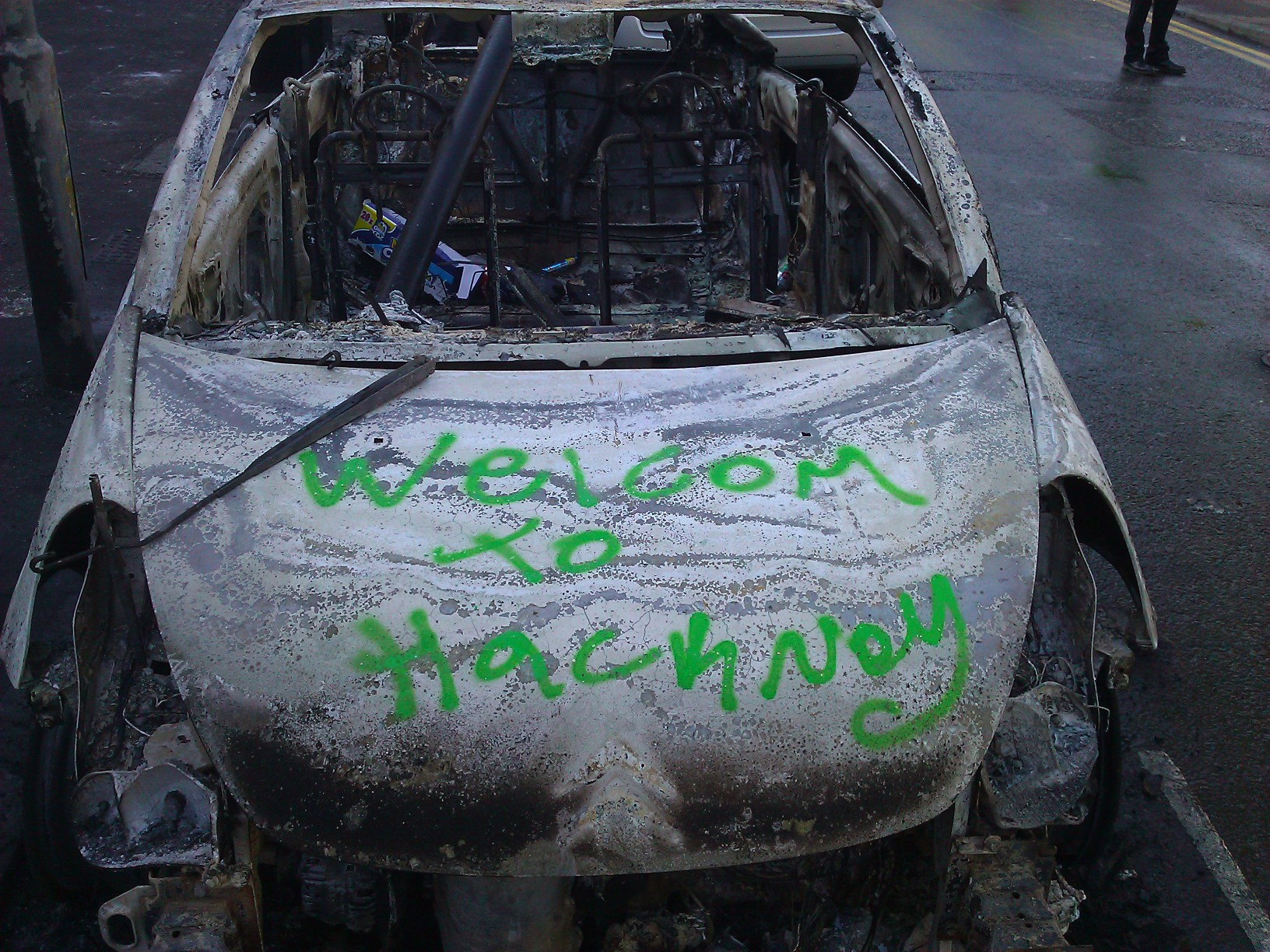
A burnt-out and vandalised car in Hackney with misspelt graffiti. Arsonists set fire to 12 cars during the riots.

In London, between Monday afternoon and the early hours of Tuesday, 14 people were injured by rioters. These included a 75-year-old woman who suffered a broken hip in Hackney.

In Barking, East London, 20-year-old Malaysian student Ashraf Haziq Rossli was beaten and then robbed twice by looters emptying his rucksack. Footage of the second mugging, which appears to show the second set of muggers pretend to help him then proceed to ransack his rucksack, was uploaded onto YouTube. He suffered a broken jaw, requiring surgery. On 2 March 2012, two men, John Kafunda of Ilford and Reece Donovan of Romford, were found guilty of the robbery of Rossli and also violent disorder by a jury at Wood Green Crown Court. The convictions were quashed by the Court of Appeal on 29 November 2012.

In Chingford, East London, three police officers were hit by a car used as a getaway vehicle by a group who had looted the Aristocrat store on Chingford Mount Road. Two of the officers were seriously injured and taken to hospital.

In total, 186 police officers were injured as well as 3 Police Community Support Officers. Five police dogs were also reported injured.

Ten firefighters were injured as the London Fire Brigade dealt with over 100 serious fires caused by the disturbances. The LFB also reported that eight of its fire appliances had their windscreens smashed and that two fire cars were attacked.

=== Property and business damage ===
Vehicles, homes and shops were attacked and set alight. At least 100 families are thought to have been made homeless by arson and looting. Shopkeepers estimated the damages in their Tottenham Hale and Tottenham branches at several million pounds. The riots caused the irretrievable loss of heritage architecture. It was estimated that retailers lost at least 30,000 trading hours.

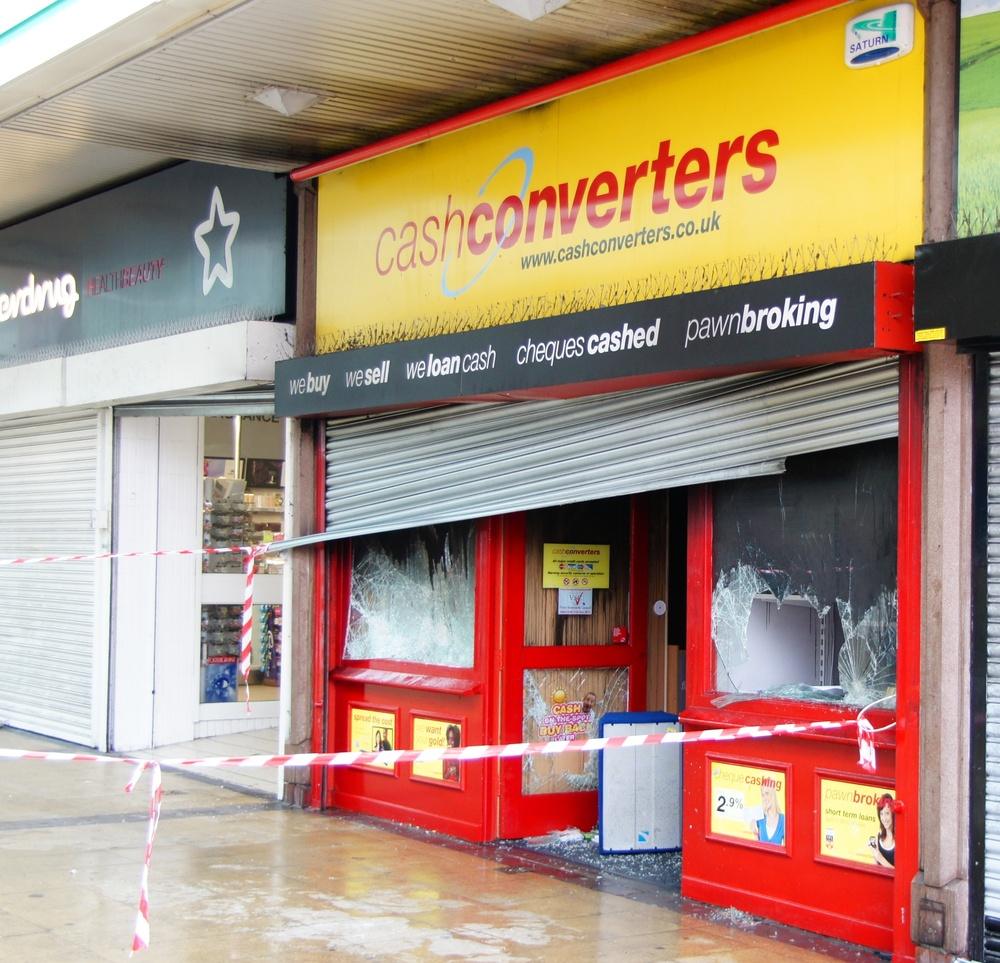
Cash Converters shop in Salford

The Association of British Insurers said that they expected the industry to pay out in excess of £200 million. Estimated losses in London were indicated to be in the region of £100m.

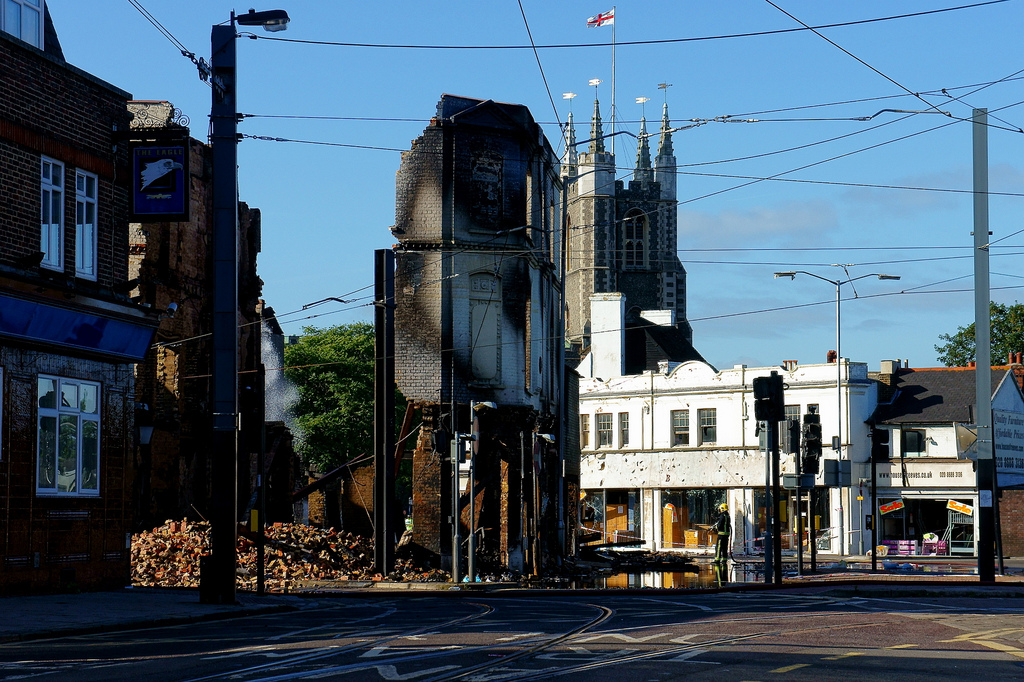
The remains of the House of Reeves shop in Croydon

On 8 August 2011, a Sony DADC warehouse in Enfield at Enfield Lock, which also acted as the primary distribution centre for independent music distributor PIAS Entertainment Group, was destroyed by fire. Initially, because millions of items of stock were lost, including most of PIAS's inventory, it was thought that long-term damage to the British independent music industry might result. On 18 August 2011, PIAS confirmed that their operations were back to normal. On 11 August 2011, London police reported that they had arrested three teenagers in connection with the warehouse fire.

The Financial Times reported that an analysis showed that 48,000 local businesses – shops, restaurants, pubs and clubs – had suffered financial losses as a result of the looting and rioting in English streets.

According to BBC News, a total of 2,584 businesses were attacked and looted, 231 homes were targeted by burglars and vandals, 664 people were robbed or injured.

=== Personal attacks and thefts ===
A 15-year-old was accused in August 2011 of raping a 13-year-old girl while the riots were taking place. The prosecution described the incident as being geographically "close" to the riots.

A 20-year-old student, Ashraf Haziq, was attacked while cycling along Queen's Road in Barking. The prosecution said that the victim was punched in the face by one of a group of 100 youths. His bike, PlayStation Portable and mobile phone were stolen. In September 2011, an accusation of robbery was made against 24-year-old Reece Donovan. The same month, a 17-year-old, Beau Isagba, was accused and in February 2012 convicted of breaking the victim's jaw with an unprovoked punch. In February 2012, John Kafunda and Reece Donovan were convicted of stealing from Rossli, after being identified on camera pretending to help him. Sony offered to replace his PSP after a video of the attack attracted attention, and Namco Bandai sent him a package of games.

=== Transport ===
Four London buses were set on fire during the riots (two of which were completely destroyed, one suffered serious damage but was subsequently repaired, and one suffered less serious damage and was also repaired) and other buses suffered broken windows and other minor damage.

On 9 August, Croydon's Tramlink was partly shut down due to damage inflicted along its route. Transport for London, London Overground and London Underground shut Barking, Peckham Rye and Harrow-on-the-Hill and Hackney Central stations. The train operating company Southern later announced that trains were not stopping at many stations in south London. National Express Coaches stopped serving Wolverhampton and suburban stops in the Birmingham area (but not Birmingham Coach Station itself) and Manchester (but not Manchester Airport).

=== Sporting fixtures ===
Five Football League Cup games due to be played on 9 and 10 August were postponed after requests from police due to the riots. The games at Bristol City, Bristol Rovers, Charlton Athletic, Crystal Palace and West Ham United were all postponed, as they were all situated within a short distance of areas which had seen some of the worst disturbances. There was also uncertainty as to the Third Test cricket match between India and England, at Edgbaston in Birmingham, but the match was played.

The international football friendly match between England and the Netherlands at Wembley Stadium due to take place on 10 August was cancelled, as well as the international friendly between Ghana and Nigeria scheduled for 9 August at Vicarage Road, Watford.

Tottenham Hotspur's opening game of the 2011–12 Premier League season against Everton on 13 August was postponed. The League Two game between Cheltenham Town and Swindon Town, due to be played the same day, was also initially postponed until further consultation allowed Gloucestershire Police to provide the required resources.

== Reactions ==
=== Political ===
Following the initial disorder in Tottenham, the constituency Labour MP David Lammy appealed for calm, saying that "true justice can only follow a thorough investigation of the facts" and that Tottenham had had its "heart ripped out" by the riots. He said that rioters were not representative of the local community as a whole and insisted that the Independent Police Complaints Commission must fully establish the circumstances of Mark Duggan's death. Lammy voiced concerns that the EDL and BNP were playing on the London riots and people's fears to advance their political motives.

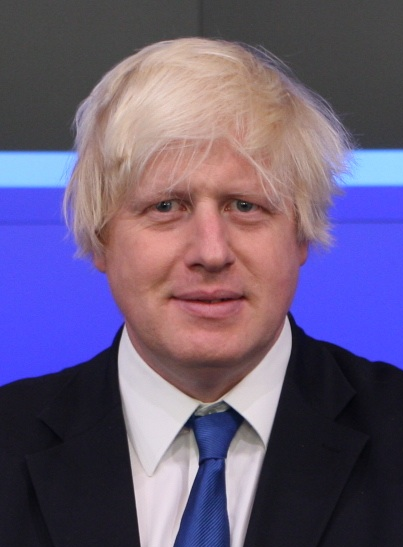
London Mayor Boris Johnson

Streatham's Labour MP Chuka Umunna condemned the violence in Brixton and Tottenham. Umunna called for the BlackBerry Messenger service, used by some of the rioters to co-ordinate their activities, to be "temporarily disabled" between 6pm and 6am BST.

The use of BlackBerry Messenger to encourage violent disorder led to arrests – a Colchester man was detained under the Serious Crime Act.

Location of incidents on 6 and 7 August: Red = 6 August, Yellow = 7 August

John Randall, the Conservative MP for Uxbridge and South Ruislip said: "It's a small minority of people causing the trouble. The events in Ealing brought it home, it's just down the Uxbridge Road." Hackney North and Stoke Newington MP Diane Abbott called for the introduction of a curfew.

Newark MP Colonel Patrick Mercer called for the deployment of water cannon. In December 2010 Theresa May, the Home Secretary, had said that the deployment of water cannon by police forces on the British mainland was an operational decision which had been "resisted until now by senior police officers". On 9 August 2011, May rejected their use and said: "The way we police in Britain is not through use of water cannon. The way we police in Britain is through consent of communities." Ken Livingstone, the former London mayor, said "The issue of water cannon would be very useful given the level of arson we are seeing here." Scotland Yard said officers did not have any water cannon and if their use was approved they would have to be brought over from Northern Ireland.

May said: "I condemn utterly the violence in Tottenham... Such disregard for public safety and property will not be tolerated, and the Metropolitan Police have my full support in restoring order." She returned to the UK from her summer holiday early to meet senior police officials on 8 August.

A spokesman for the Prime Minister's office added: "The rioting in Tottenham last night was utterly unacceptable. There is no justification for the aggression the police and the public faced, or for the damage to property."

The deputy prime minister Nick Clegg said that the riots were "completely unacceptable" and described the violence as "needless and opportunistic".

London's mayor, Boris Johnson, who cut short his summer holiday in Canada to return to the UK on 9 August, said: "I'm appalled at the scenes of violence and destruction in Tottenham" whilst his deputy Kit Malthouse told a Sky News reporter that "criminal elements were to blame for the trouble".

Prime Minister David Cameron returned from his Italian summer holiday early and he chaired several COBRA emergency meetings with police officials. Cameron condemned the "terrible scenes of people looting, vandalising, thieving, robbing" and told rioters "You will feel the full force of the law. And if you are old enough to commit these crimes, you are old enough to face the punishment."

Croydon Central MP Gavin Barwell called the damage caused in the London Borough of Croydon "sickening".

In a strongly worded criticism of what he deems to be a misplaced "hyper-sensitivity about race", dating back to the Macpherson Report of 1999, Civitas director David Green attributed the reluctance by police to use force to a fear of disciplinary action. He said that "officers in charge of [handling] a riot think it safer to wait for orders from the top".

In a public speech on 15 August, David Cameron blamed a "broken society" in "moral collapse" – broad societal change themes common to his party's election campaign theme Broken Britain.

The city councils of Manchester and Salford were reported to be investigating their powers for ways of evicting tenants if they, or their children, have been involved in violence or looting in their cities. The London Borough of Greenwich also stated on its website: "We shall seek the eviction of anyone living in council property if they are found to have been engaged in criminal acts."

=== International ===
Several countries issued warnings advising caution to travellers visiting the United Kingdom during the riots.

Khaled Kaim, the Deputy Foreign Minister of the Gaddafi government in Libya, called on Cameron to resign over the riots, stating that "Cameron has lost all legitimacy and must go", he also called for an international intervention in the UK against Cameron and accused Cameron of using Irish and Scottish mercenaries against rioters, mocking Cameron's comments on Gaddafi during the First Libyan Civil War that year.

In 2012, the Syrian Ambassador to the UN, Bashar Jaafari compared the situation and government response of the Syrian uprising to that of the 2011 England riots.

=== Press ===
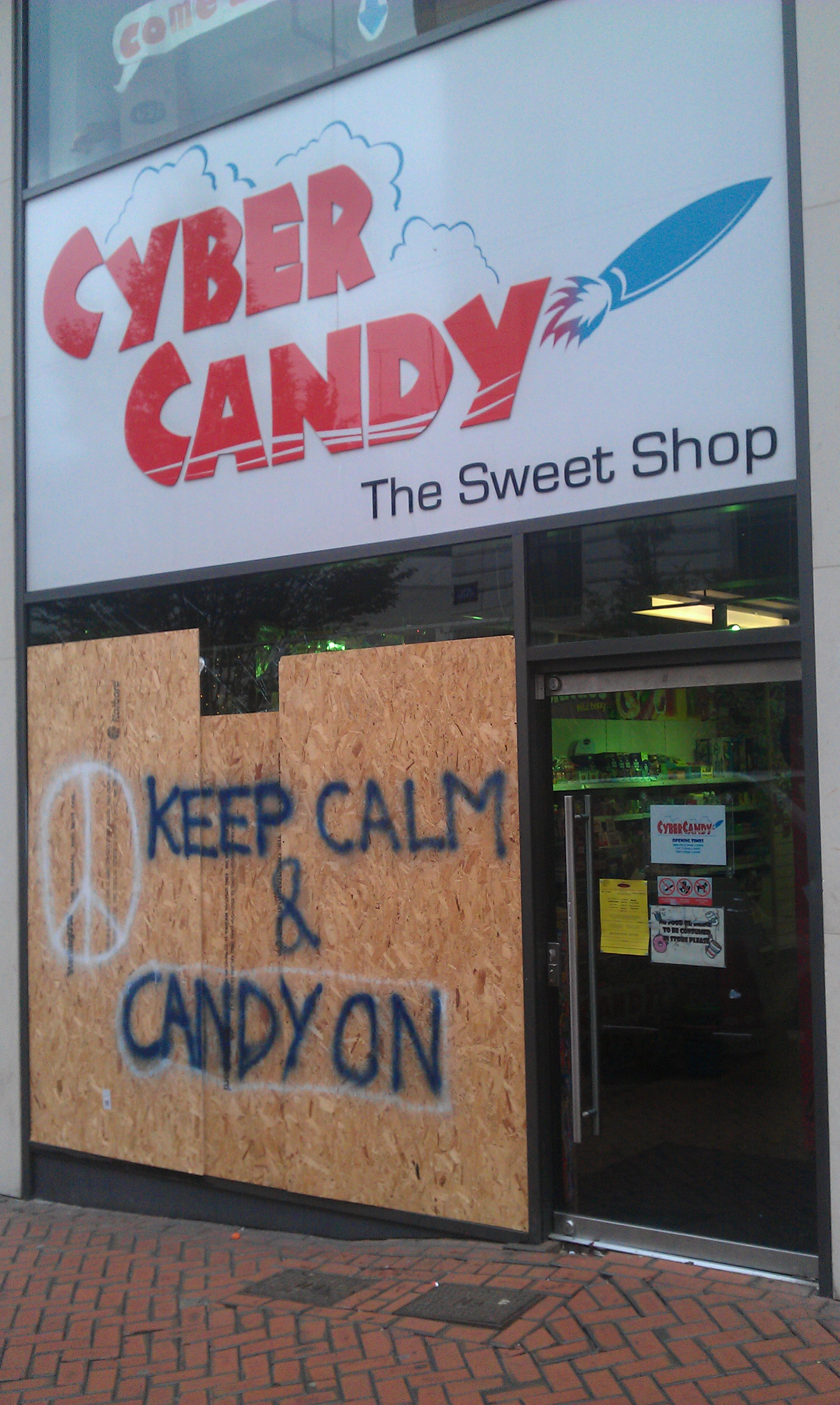
"Keep Calm and Candy On" graffiti on boards covering the windows of the Cyber Candy store in Upper Bull Street, Birmingham, smashed in the riots

The riots were described by one journalist as "the worst disturbances of their kind since the 1995 Brixton riots".

Commentators likened the riots to the Broadwater Farm riot of 1985, during which a police officer, Keith Blakelock, was murdered. The disturbances were preceded by calls for better oversight of the Metropolitan Police, repeating observations which go back to the murder of Stephen Lawrence and the New Cross Fire. In April 2011 there was a large nonviolent march to Scotland Yard as a result of the death of Smiley Culture. The very widespread scale of the violence prompted comparisons with the Gordon Riots of 1780.

The Daily Telegraph's editorial said: "What we have experienced in London and elsewhere since Saturday night is a wholly new phenomenon: violent disorder whose sole intent is criminal... In such circumstances, there can be only one response if the law-abiding majority is to be protected: the thugs must be taught to respect the law of the land the hard way."

The Telegraph also reported: "Tottenham riots: police let gangs run riot and loot: Britain's biggest police force is facing criticism after it let looters run riot in north London for almost 12 hours..."

The Guardian called on the public to back the police: "... Britain's 2011 riots have become a defining contest between disorder and order. In that contest, important caveats notwithstanding, there is only one right side to be on. The attacks, the destruction, the criminality and the reign of fear must be stopped. The rule of law in the cities of Britain must not only be defended against delinquent destruction. It must also be enforced."

During the height of the riots, The Guardian was accused of anti-Semitic incitement by the media monitoring organisation, Comment Is Free Watch (CiFW), after Guardian journalist Paul Lewis singled out Hasidic Jewish residents who were not involved in the rioting. The content of his report stated, "The make-up of the rioters was racially mixed. Most were men or boys, some apparently as young as 10....But families and other local residents, including some from Tottenham's Hasidic Jewish community, also gathered to watch and jeer at police." CIFW responded by condemning the newspaper saying, "A 1,800 Guardian report doesn't mention the race, ethnicity, or religion of the rioters, somehow found it pertinent to note that some of those who gathered to jeer police were, allegedly, Hasidic Jews." As a result of the negative publicity, The Guardian revised the story.

In its 9 August leading article, The Independent said the police's handling of Mark Duggan's death "looks to have been poor", and that there is "context of mistrust of the police here". The paper added that "it is spurious to draw a connection between that disaffection [by the inner-city youth] and specific outbreaks of violence of the sort we have seen in recent days."

Psychiatrist Theodore Dalrymple wrote an opinion piece for the New York Daily News, in which he blamed the "sense of entitlement" that he sees as being common among Britain's youth as a cause for the riots, and said that British youth are today among "the most unpleasant and violent in the world" as a result.

Some journalists made comparisons between these riots and the 2005 riots in France. In both cases, the unrest started with the death of a young person during a confrontation with the police. In fact, a television report by France 2, broadcast in November 2005, showed a visit by a delegation from Évry (just outside Paris) to Tottenham, with the report calling "Tottenham part of London "regularly shaken by riots" in earlier decades, where "a lot of money was invested" and "the promotion of ethnic minorities", had been made a priority".

Writing in Pakistan's Newsline, Mahir Ali likened the government's response to that of Margaret Thatcher to the 1981 England riots.

=== Public ===
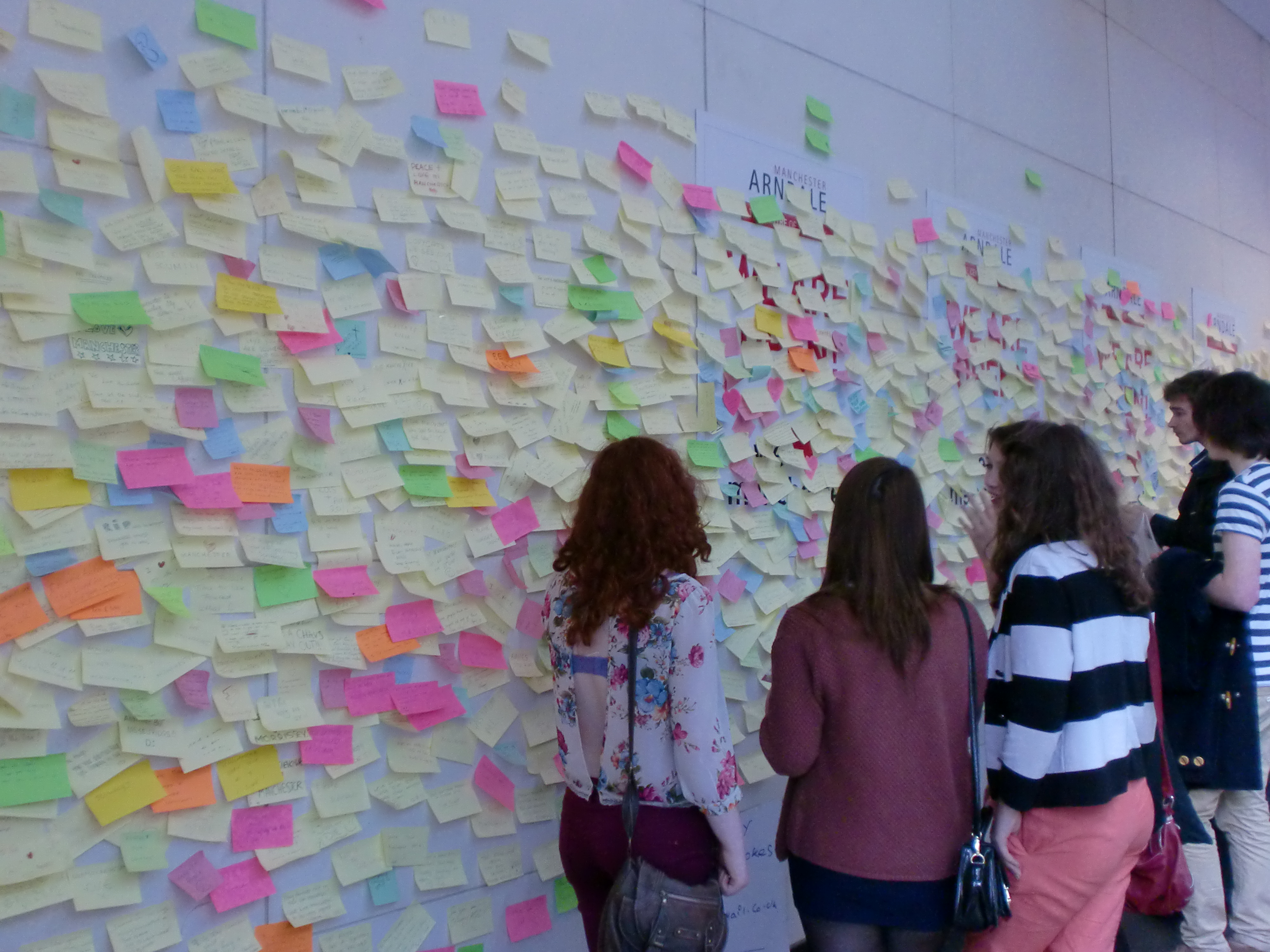
'Peace wall' in the Manchester Arndale Centre

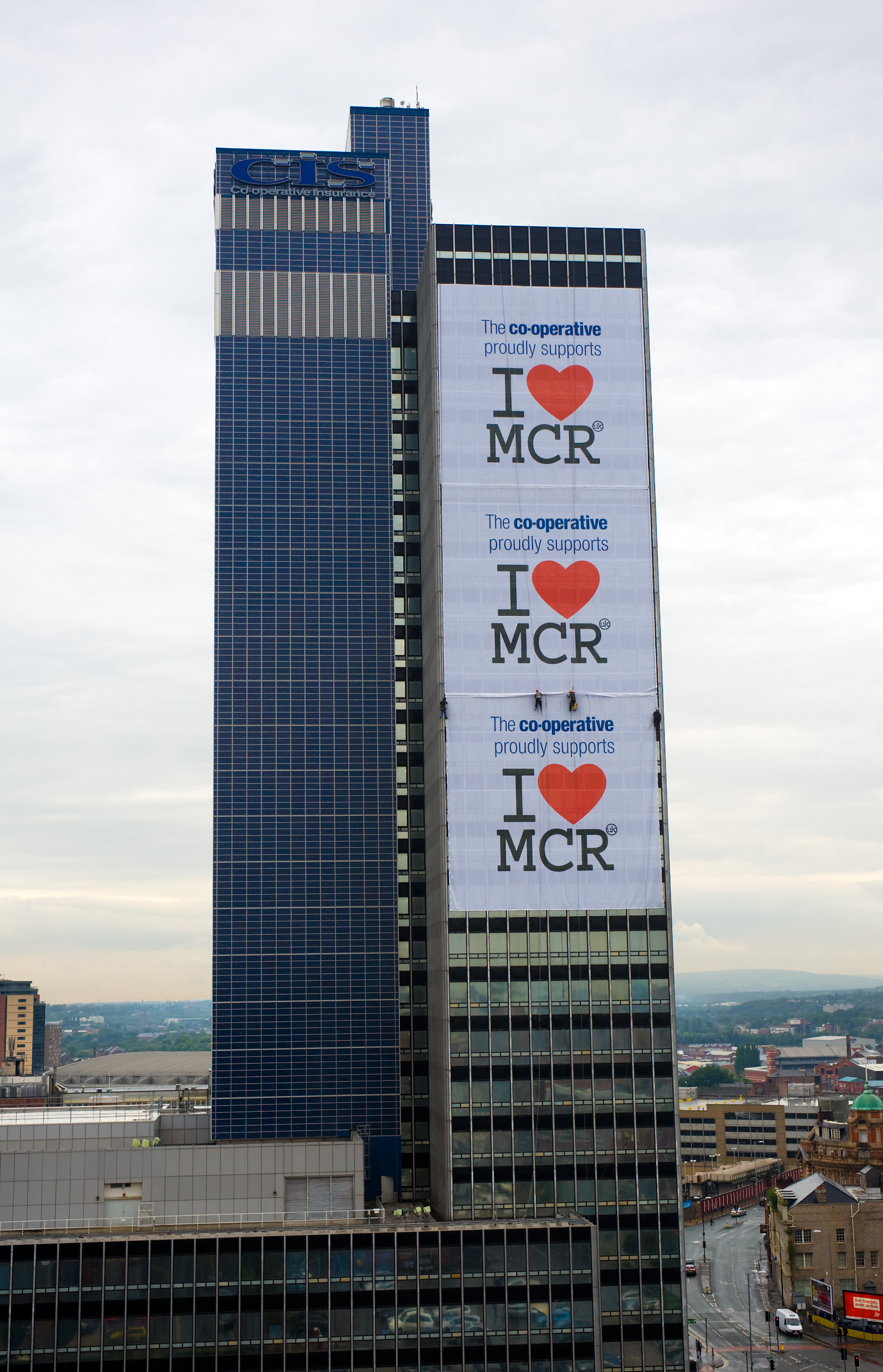
A number of campaigns were launched, aiming to foster greater civic pride in their cities. Pictured is the CIS Tower, Manchester.

Many people called for the government to urge the police to deploy anti-riot methods often used outside Great Britain, such as water cannon and baton rounds (which have been used in Northern Ireland), the use of which has long been resisted by senior police commanders and politicians.

Pauline Pearce, a 45-year-old woman from Hackney, was filmed close to the rioting, furiously chastising looters over their criminal behaviour. She was seen holding a walking-stick and gesturing. The resulting Heroine of Hackney video subsequently went viral. Its rapid spread was helped by tweeting from famous people such as newspaper editor Piers Morgan. Pearce was hailed as a heroine for helping to ease tensions in Hackney; her influence was acknowledged by politicians and the national press. MP for Hackney South and Shoreditch, Meg Hillier, invited Pearce to the Houses of Parliament. Speaking to The Australian newspaper, Pearce described the looting and vandalism as being "heart-breaking" and also contrasted people's relative poverty with expenditure for the Olympic Games. Pearce was subsequently featured in The Spectator, dismissing David Starkey's view that hip-hop culture was partly to blame for the riots. In September 2011, she was awarded the Team London Award at the annual Peace Awards by Boris Johnson.

Still image from Pauline Pearce's Heroine of Hackney speech

On Amazon, sales of baseball bats and truncheons increased significantly overnight. Deputy Assistant Commissioner Stephen Kavanagh stated: "We are already seeing a community kickback. People are angry. This is their neighbourhoods that are at stake." Political commentator and foreign affairs analyst Nile Gardiner suggested that the British Government should prompt a debate which will allow British business owners the right to keep and bear arms.

Three men killed in a hit-and-run incident in Birmingham, Haroon Jahan, Shazad Ali, and Abdul Musavir Tariq, were described as heroes for dying while attempting to defend their neighbourhood. Tariq Jahan, the father of 21-year-old victim Haroon, gave a speech appealing for calm, social unity and an end to the violence, hours after his son's death. Jahan was hailed as a hero and a patriot for helping to ease tensions in Birmingham; his influence was acknowledged by politicians and the national press, receiving an award at the 2011 Pride of Britain Awards. Conservative MEP Daniel Hannan said of him: "Uncomplaining, in control of his emotions, Tariq Jahan reminds us of what it means to be British." The Financial Times described Jahan as eloquent and inspiring, and said "His selfless intervention contrasted with the rapacious self-interest of the looters, and was a timely reminder of the obligations of community."

Tens of thousands of users of social networking sites coordinated clean-up operations of their local shopping areas and streets. Some of these groups began being referred to as 'riot wombles', taking up brooms and other tools to clear streets of debris and wreckage, a term that was later used by Prime Minister David Cameron during a speech on the aftermath of the riots on 15 August 2011. Social media sites Twitter and Facebook were also used for reporting information on the riots and to co-ordinate a voluntary citizens' operation to clear up riot-hit areas. In Clapham Junction, dozens of volunteers carrying brooms turned out to assist with clean-up efforts. On Facebook, over 900,000 people joined a group entitled "Supporting the Met Police against the London rioters".

Manchester City Councillor Pat Karney, the city centre spokesperson for Manchester City Council, said: "The true Mancunian civic spirit has been shown in Manchester today." Staff from city centre businesses and Manchester Metropolitan University joined the volunteers, as food outlets gave out free drinks and snacks. There were several fundraising initiatives to help independent business owners re-build their businesses and livelihoods.

On 17 August 2011, Prince Charles and Camilla, Duchess of Cornwall visited areas of London, including the Tottenham Green Leisure Centre, which was transformed into an aid centre in the aftermath of the rioting and met families left homeless by the London riots.

A petition was submitted to the UK government proposing that any convicted rioters have their benefit payments cut. This petition was signed by over 200,000 people.

A petition on the UK government website demanding convicted rioters to be banished to the Outer Hebrides of Scotland was set up in the summer of 2011. The reaction caused a public outcry in Scotland and eventually Westminster offered an apology to Western Isles MP Angus Brendan MacNeil.

==== Vigilantism ====
By 20:00 on 7 August, the major rioting had spread to Wood Green, but some riot police were on hand. Again, the police did not intervene to stop the looting. The mostly Turkish and Kurdish shop owners along Wood Green, Turnpike Lane and Green Lanes, Harringay, were said to have formed local "protection units" around their shops.

On 8 and 9 August, people from Indian, Bangladeshi, Pakistani, Kurdish, Turkish, Sikh and English communities chased down masked youths in several areas of North and East London, including Green Street, Hackney, Haringey, and Tower Hamlets. Conservative MEP Daniel Hannan praised the community for their brave and responsible reactions to the crisis.

On 9 August, vigilantes assembled in Enfield, including several members of the English Defence League, locals and supporters of the football club Millwall in Eltham, and the Sikh communities in Southall, East Ham, Ilford and Romford.

Sangat TV and Sikh Channel urged their viewers to protect Sikh temples after a report that one was attacked in Birmingham. On the night of 9–10 August 2011, following violence, arson and rioting in London, members of the Sikh community in Southall volunteered to stand guard at various city Gurdwaras, with as many as 200 to 300 Sikhs from different age groups gathered in various Gurudwaras across Southall to safeguard their places of worship from rioters, some armed with swords and hockey sticks. The Sikhs drew praise from Prime Minister David Cameron for this action.

On 10 August in Eltham, police clashed with a bottle-throwing crowd of about 200 vigilantes, including many English Defence League members. It was reported that 50 EDL members joined forces with locals to patrol the streets. That same day, a senior police officer said that some vigilante groups were hampering police operations in London.

==== Race relations ====
The ethnic makeup of the rioters varied in different cities: 76% of those arrested in Manchester were white, while 29% were white and 39% black in London, and the West Midlands was the only area where more than 6% were Asian.

Research conducted by the University of Nottingham suggested that race relations in Britain deteriorated in the period following the riots and that prejudice towards ethnic minorities increased. After the hit-and-run incident in Birmingham, in which three Asian men were killed by a black driver, racial tensions between blacks and Asians in Birmingham increased; hostilities were defused by the public appeals for an end to violence by Tariq Jahan, father of one of the victims.

The effects of Black culture were discussed by historian David Starkey in the edition of the BBC's Newsnight TV programme of 12 August. Starkey singled out the influence of black gangster and rap culture on youths of all races, contrasting contemporary youth patois with the speech patterns of black Tottenham MP David Lammy, who, Starkey said, "sounded white". The author Dreda Say Mitchell countered his argument by saying that there is no one single "black culture".

Some commentators remarked on the apparently high proportion of black people involved in the riots and took the view that there was a disproportionately high number of rioters who were black, compared to the overall demographics of the United Kingdom. As the Ministry of Justice has admitted "the group of people brought before the courts is only a subset of all people who took part in the public disorder". In February 2012, a report was published by the Ministry of Justice providing demographic statistics of the people charged over participation the riots up to 1 February 2012, which revealed that 41% of those brought before the courts identified themselves as being from the White group, 39% from the black ethnic group, 12% from the Mixed ethnic group, 6% the Asian ethnic group, and 2% the Other ethnic group. These figures were disproportionate to the average UK population; however, the figures revealed varying demographics in different areas when compared to local populations. For example, in Haringey, the figures revealed that 55% of defendants in court over riot-related charges were black, compared to a 17% Black population; in Salford, 94% of rioters in court were white, compared to an 88% white population, and 6% of rioters were black, compared to a 2% black population. Additionally, looters from 44 foreign countries were jailed, with Jamaicans representing the largest group.

The Ministry of Justice report also noted that rioters brought before the courts were disproportionately male (89%) and young (53% were aged 20 or under, with the number of "juveniles" ranging from 26% in London to 39% in Merseyside, and very few listed as over 40).

=== Police ===
==== Operations ====
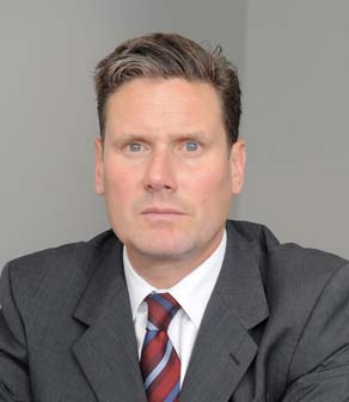
Keir Starmer, then Director of Public Prosecutions

The Metropolitan Police launched Operation Withern, an investigation into the events leading up to and during the riots. The operation was initially led by Detective Superintendent John Sweeney of the Metropolitan Police, with detectives from the Homicide and Serious Crime Command, specialist investigators from the Public Order Branch, and police support staff. Detective Superintendent Robin Bhairam, took over the post event investigation, where officers were drawn from all over the MPS, from different business groups, and placed into ten Investigation Hubs across London. The Deputy Assistant Commissioner of the Metropolitan Police, Steve Kavanagh, stated that the number of officers deployed tripled between 6 and 7 August.

The BBC reported that West Midlands riot police officers were issued with plastic bullets to use against looters, but that none were fired. Metropolitan Police deputy assistant commissioner Stephen Kavanagh confirmed that police in London were considering using baton rounds against rioters, not previously used by mainland police in public order operations (though they were first approved for use in England and Wales in 2001).

The Metropolitan Police assigned 450 detectives to hunt for rioters and looters. The list of photographed looters was made available on their website. Assistant Chief Constable Garry Shewan of Greater Manchester Police criticised "unprecedented" criminality. On 10 August, he warned: "Hundreds and hundreds of people, we have your image, we have your face, we have your acts of wanton criminality on film."

Research in Motion (RIM), the maker of the BlackBerry, are reported to have contacted the police to offer help in investigating the use of their system for the organisation of riots.

According to The Independent, the costs to the Metropolitan Police of policing the disorder and disturbances in London were expected to exceed £34 million. This would have been more than their total bill for the policing of all major public disorder events in the year from April 2010 to March 2011.

==== Arrests and charges ====
By 15 August 2011, around 3,100 people had been arrested, of whom over 1,100 had appeared in court. On 25 August, the BBC reported that more than 2,000 people had been arrested in connection with the disorder in London.

=== Justice system ===
==== Prosecutions ====
The then Director of Public Prosecutions and Head of the Crown Prosecution Service Keir Starmer said that he thought that speedy prosecutions were more effective as a deterrent than long sentences. Some lawyers involved in the prosecutions criticised what they referred to as "chaos".

==== Sentencing guidelines ====
It was reported in mid-August that some courts were advised by senior justice clerks to deal harshly with offences committed during the disturbances. The advice was said to tell the courts that they could ignore existing sentencing guidelines and hand down heavy sentences. David Cameron defended the courts for handing out tough sentences, while some Liberal Democrat MPs and civil rights groups criticised some sentences being handed down. Groups of lawyers complained that Crown Prosecutors were opposing bail in more cases than usual. Empirical evidence suggests tougher sentencing reduced riot-related offences, but that non-riot offences increased.

==== Trials and sentencing ====
On 1 September 2011 the BBC reported that official Ministry of Justice figures showed that of the 1,566 people that had appeared before magistrates on charges connected with the disorder, 1,027 had been in London, 190 in Greater Manchester, 132 in the West Midlands, 67 in Merseyside and 64 in Nottingham.

Sentences of four years in a Young Offender Institution were given to two males who promoted riots via Facebook. The proposed events in Northwich and Warrington were not attended by any other people. These sentences were affirmed on appeal by the Court of Appeal. Giving the judgment of the court, the Lord Chief Justice of England and Wales, Lord Judge, sitting with Sir John Thomas and Lord Justice Leveson, stated that there is "an overwhelming obligation on sentencing courts to do what they can to ensure the protection of the public", that "the imposition of severe sentences, intended to provide both punishment and deterrence, must follow" and that "[t]hose who deliberately participate in disturbances of this magnitude, causing injury and damage and fear to even the most stout-hearted of citizens, and who individually commit further crimes during the course of the riots are committing aggravated crimes". The appeals were dismissed.

On 25 April 2012, the Court of Appeal (Lord Judge CJ, Openshaw & Irwin JJ) increased the sentence imposed by the Inner London Crown Court on Adam Ahmadzai from four years detention to seven years detention for offences of violent disorder, robbery, burglary and criminal damage committed during the riots on 8 August 2011, following a reference from Attorney General, Dominic Grieve QC. The Lord Chief Justice stated that the offences were of the "greatest possible seriousness".

A woman who had not taken part in the riots received five months for receiving a pair of stolen shorts. The sentence was later reduced on appeal. Greater Manchester Police used Twitter to celebrate the five-month sentence; they later apologised and removed the tweet. A teenager was freed when prosecutors found evidence he had been wrongly charged with arson. While in prison, his own flat was burned down. The detaining of under-18s without criminal records was criticised by UNICEF in October 2011 for possibly breaching the 1989 UN Convention on the Rights of the Child. By August 2012, 1,292 rioters had been handed custodial sentences totalling 1,800 years at 16.8 months on an average.

=== Theatrical ===
The Tricycle Theatre in Kilburn presented a piece of new writing, The Riots by Gillian Slovo, which looked into the events over those days in August and the thoughts and opinions of a range of people directly involved and politicians. It transferred to the Bernie Grant Arts Centre in Tottenham, about 400 metres from where the Mark Duggan protest took place, on 5 January 2012, and was due to run until 15 January. The piece included community leaders Stafford Scott and Martin Sylvester Brown, police constables on duty that night and a former resident of the Carpet-Right building, the burned remains now providing a reminder of the events. They were combined with the views of Diane Abbott, Iain Duncan Smith, Michael Gove and Pastor Nims Obunge. It was received well by all critics, with 4 stars from The Guardian.

== Suggested contributory factors ==
The causes of the 2011 England riots both immediate and long-term have been the subject of media and academic debate. Several speculations have emerged as to what the likely contributory factors might be for the riots; from socio-economic causes focusing on unemployment and spending cuts, as well as social media, gang culture and criminal opportunism. The House of Commons Home Affairs select committee began examining the police response to the riots in late 2011. The then leader of the Opposition, Ed Miliband, called for a public inquiry into the wider causes of the riots and has stated that his party would set up such an inquiry if the coalition fails to do so.

A wide-ranging LSE study called Reading the Riots concluded that the major contributory factors were opportunism, perceived social injustice, deprivation, and frustration at the way communities were policed.

A YouGov poll was carried out on 8–9 August 2011 for The Sun asking what those surveyed believed to be the main cause of the riots. In it, 42% of those polled thought "criminal behaviour" to be the main cause, whilst 26% thought "gang culture" was, 8% thought "government cuts" were, 5% thought "unemployment" was, 5% thought "racial tensions" was and 3% thought "poor policing" was. In a ComRes poll for the Sunday Mirror and Independent on Sunday, in which the question was "do you agree or disagree with these statements about the recent riots?", 90% of those polled agreed that the "Police should be allowed use [sic] to water cannon to disperse rioters", 90% agreed that "There is no excuse whatsoever for the violent rioting and looting over the last few days", 61% agreed that "Government ministers failed to return to their desks quickly enough from holidays" and 50% agreed that "The Government's response to the economic crisis (e.g. cuts to services, unemployment, reduced education funding) is helping fuel the rioters".

Researchers who study the causes of political instability suggest that the critical common factor is the density of youths. A nation's extent of political unrest, i.e. its vulnerability to riot, war or regime change, is directly associated with the percentage of 15- to 24-year-olds in its population. They argue that communities with more than 20% of individuals in this age group run the greatest risk of more frequent and more intense political instability. They describe the phenomena as the "youth bulge theory", where the "bulge" refers to the fattening of the population pyramid just before the base of the youngest age groups.

=== Poor relations with the police ===
The riots in Tottenham after the death of Mark Duggan were initially blamed on poor relations between the police and the black community. Professor Gus John has argued that the tactical use of frequent "stop and search", particularly of young black men, has caused resentment of the police in the black community.

According to David Lammy, the MP for Tottenham, the "cracks that already existed between the police and the community became deep fissures".

The Guardian's Reading the Riots Survey concluded: "Although rioters expressed a mix of opinions about the disorder, many of those involved said they felt like they were participating in explicitly anti-police riots. They cited "policing" as the most significant cause of the riots, and anger over the police shooting of Mark Duggan, which triggered initial disturbances in Tottenham, was repeatedly mentioned – even outside London."

=== Social exclusion ===
Rioters themselves cited exclusion as a reason for their actions. One person, asked by a journalist if rioting was really the best way to accomplish their objectives, responded: "Yes, because if we weren't rioting, you wouldn't be talking to us."

Camila Batmanghelidjh writing in The Independent blamed social exclusion and social deprivation. Various journalists identified poverty and the growing gap between rich and poor as causative factors.

In a House of Commons debate on the riots Home Secretary Theresa May stated that the riots were symptomatic of a "wider malaise" including worklessness, illiteracy, and drug abuse but also stated that "Everybody, no matter what their background or circumstances, has the freedom to choose between right and wrong". Former Prime Minister Tony Blair, writing in The Observer, stated that the riots were not caused by a broken society, but due to a group of young, alienated, disaffected youth who are outside the social mainstream and who live in a culture at odds with any canons of proper behaviour; he added that this is found in virtually every developed nation.

An article from the IWCA dubbed the riots as "the lumpen rebellion" and example of a neo-liberal riot.

Max Hastings of the Daily Mail was quoted as blaming young people with an "entitlement culture" and being "bereft of discipline".

A journalist on Al Jazeera suggested a similarity to the disenfranchisement behind the Arab Spring revolutionary wave of 2011. Links were made to high youth unemployment and general disenfranchisement. A study by the Financial Times published in September 2011 found a strong link between rioting and deprivation.

=== Family breakdown ===
Christina Odone writing in The Daily Telegraph links the riots to a lack of male role models and argues that "Like the overwhelming majority of youth offenders behind bars, these gang members have one thing in common: no father at home." This has been linked further with England's having the "worst record in family breakdown in Europe".

=== Government cuts ===
The spending cuts of the coalition government in the United Kingdom have also been cited as a cause. Ken Livingstone, the Labour Candidate for Mayor of London in 2012 has argued that "The economic stagnation and cuts being imposed by the Tory government inevitably create social division." Nick Clegg, the Deputy Prime Minister and leader of the Liberal Democrats political party, made it clear that the government's planned cuts to police budgets will go ahead.

The local government budget had been cut in the past year so Haringey Council, which includes Tottenham and Tottenham Hale, decided to close eight of its 13 youth clubs in 2011, rather than save money through increased efficiency or make cuts in other areas.

Scrapping of the Education Maintenance Allowance, removing of funding for courses where the student already has an equal or lower level qualification and trebling of university tuition fees, combined with high youth unemployment has placed the British youth "between a rock and a hard place" alienating and angering the youth population. Proponents of this argument say that Scottish youth did not riot partly because Scottish students do not have to pay tuition fees.

=== Unemployment and poverty ===
David Lammy MP has said that Tottenham has the highest unemployment rate in London and the eighth highest in the United Kingdom. The number of people chasing every one job vacancy in Haringey has been put at 23 and 54 in separate reports, and fears had spread of disorder after youth club closures in recent months. One report about a citizen's inquiry conducted in the aftermath of the violence noted that in Tottenham there were about 10,000 unemployed residents and only 367 job vacancies when the riots broke.

Haringey has the fourth highest level of child poverty in London and 8.8% unemployed.

=== Rioting for fun ===
Other academics have pointed to more prosaic causes of the 2011 riots, citing the carnivalesque atmospheres created through the usual uses of urban space. For example, researchers from the University of Birmingham noted that 'another sound could be heard above the mêlée, that of laughter. Above the bark of police dogs, and behind the masked and hooded faces of the throng, were smiles, laughter, and shrieks of joy.'

=== Gang culture ===
In a Newsnight discussion on 12 August, historian David Starkey blamed black gangster culture, saying that it had influenced youths of all races. The BBC received nearly 700 complaints about his statement that the "whites have become black".

=== Criminal opportunism ===
During the riots, on 9 August 2011, UK Home Secretary Theresa May said: "I think this is about sheer criminality. That is what we have seen on the streets. The violence we've seen, the looting we've seen, the thuggery we've seen – this is sheer criminality, and let's make no bones about it." Paul Hobbs, London correspondent for One News said that looters are not politically motivated and called the riots "recreational violence". A Manchester rioter said to a BBC correspondent: "Every time I go into town I just think how the shops got smashed up in 2011 by all of us, I just laugh about it every time I go back in now."

The BBC reported that the Chief Constable of West Midlands Police had stated that he thought that the motivation for rioters targeting the city centre was not anger, but greed.

=== Moral decay at the top ===
Daily Telegraph columnist Peter Oborne suggested that moral decay is just as bad at the top of society as it is at the bottom, with the rich and powerful generating anger among the British population. He cited the MPs' expenses scandal, bankers' bonuses, and the phone hacking scandal as setting poor examples. In the Financial Times cartoonist Ingram Pinn depicted a Union Flag being broken through by a looter in a hoodie carrying a stolen box of Adidas trainers, preceded by two men in suits carrying piles of cash, one saying "MP's Expenses" and another "Banker's Bonus".

=== Failure of the penal system ===
Kenneth Clarke, the Lord Chancellor and Secretary of State for Justice, writing in The Guardian, described the riots in part as "an outburst of outrageous behaviour by the criminal classes". He drew attention to the statistic that almost three-quarters of the adults who had been charged with offences related to the disorder already had a criminal record. Clarke characterised this as the legacy of "a broken penal system", one that did not have a good record for preventing reoffending. He said he was proposing radical new measures intended to focus on robust punishment and on delivering reductions in reoffending.

=== Mainstream media relationship with the communities ===
A conference held in November 2012 and its subsequent report by Dr Leah Bassel of the University of Leicester, entitled Media and the Riots – A Call For Action, examined the relationship between mainstream media and communities affected by the riots. It criticised the portrayal of young people in the media coverage, particularly young black people who were disproportionately singled out as being involved. It also criticised the press in spreading misinformation from unreliable sources and in particular disinformation emanating from the police.

In the article Youth voices in post-English riots Tottenham: The role of reflexivity in negotiating negative representations, Elster explores the subjective accounts of a group of eighteen 15- to 25-year-olds from Tottenham. This study shows that the media portrayals of the communities associated with the riots were unrecognisable to those actually living in these communities. Its findings also indicate a consensus among the research participants, who were all from the "riot-hit areas", that the UK general public perceive them, and the wider communities in which they live, through media's "riot discourse".

== See also ==
- Broken Britain
- Crisis situations and unrest in Europe since 2000

Other riots in the UK

- 1981 Brixton riot
- 2001 England riots
- 2022 Leicester unrest
- 2023 Dublin riot
- 2024 Leeds riot
- 2024 United Kingdom riots
- 2025 Northern Ireland riots
- 2026 Southampton riots
- 2026 Northern Ireland riots

Other riots in response to police incidents

- 1992 Los Angeles riots
- 2005 French riots
- 2006 Brussels riots
- 2007 Villiers-le-Bel riots
- 2013 Trappes riots
- 2013 Stockholm riots
- Ferguson unrest
- George Floyd protests

Other major civil unrests

- Gezi Park protests
- 2008–2009 Oslo anti-Israel riots
