= Broken Britain =

2007–2010 UK Conservative political term

Broken Britain is a term which was used by the UK's Conservative Party from 2007 to 2010 to describe a perceived widespread state of social decay in the UK under the tenure of Labour Party Prime Minister Gordon Brown.

== Political usage ==
David Cameron had referred to "Broken Britain" during his time as leader of the Conservative Party, and pledged to "fix" Broken Britain during the campaign for the 2010 general election. In September 2009, The Sun announced that it would back the Conservatives in the 2010 election, having supported the Labour Party in 1997, 2001, and 2005, stating that Labour had "failed on law and order". Iain Duncan Smith published two reports, "Breakdown Britain" and "Breakthrough Britain", dealing with similar themes, through the Centre for Social Justice. By contrast, The Guardian ran a series of articles in 2010 questioning this theme, under the title "Is Britain Broken?"

The Conservatives came under criticism after publishing an inaccurate figure in a 2010 report on teenage pregnancy and crime rates. After the 2011 England riots, Cameron alluded to many of these themes while speaking on the UK's "moral collapse". Under the banner of "Broken Society", he listed "irresponsibility, selfishness, behaving as if your choices have no consequences, children without fathers, schools without discipline, reward without effort, crime without punishment, rights without responsibilities".

== In popular culture ==
A number of films released from 2006 featured the theme of Broken Britain. They include Kidulthood and its sequels, Adulthood and Brotherhood, Ill Manors, Harry Brown, F (film), Eden Lake, Cherry Tree Lane, The Disappeared, Summer Scars, Outlaw, Attack the Block, The Great Ecstasy of Robert Carmichael, DNA and Heartless. The 2000 AD story Cradlegrave also played with similar "hoodie horror" themes.

Noel Edmonds' 2008 Sky1 programme Noel's HQ (which highlighted philanthropic efforts) was billed by its host and broadcaster as being a "response to a broken Britain".

== See also ==
- Social class in the United Kingdom
- Chav
- Crime in the United Kingdom
- Booze Britain
- Rip-off Britain

General:

- Criticism of welfare
- Group cohesiveness
- Societal collapse
