= The Disappeared (2008 film) =

- Directed by: Johnny Kevorkian
- Written by: Johnny Kevorkian; Neil Murphy
- Produced by: Johnny Kevorkian; Neil Murphy
- Starring: Harry Treadaway; Greg Wise
- Cinematography: Diego Rodriguez
- Edited by: Celia Haining
- Music by: Ilan Eshkeri
- Release dates: 20 August 2008 (Espoo Film Festival); 19 June 2009 (United Kingdom)
- Running time: 96 minutes
- Country: United Kingdom
- Language: English

The Disappeared is a British thriller/horror film directed by Johnny Kevorkian and starring Harry Treadaway, Greg Wise, Tom Felton, and Ros Leeming.

== Plot ==
Matthew Ryan (Harry Treadaway) has just been released from a psychiatric hospital following a breakdown resulting from the disappearance of his younger brother, Tom. Feeling guilty and responsible for Tom's disappearance, he begins to hear Tom's voice and to see him around. He seeks advice from his friend Simon (Tom Felton), the parish priest Adrian Ballan (Alex Jennings), and his new neighbour, Amy Tyler (Ros Leeming). Amy gives him a newspaper clipping about a psychic medium, Shelley Cartwright (Nikki Amuka-Bird), who lives nearby, and suggests that he visit her for help, which he does. Shelley suggests that Tom's ghost is trying to warn Matthew about something, and Shelley's daughter Rebecca (Tyler Anthony) gives him a drawing of a girl.

Matthew learns that Simon's younger sister Sophie (Georgia Groome) has also gone missing. He goes to Simon and tells him about Shelley, showing him Rebecca's drawing. They realise that the drawing is of Sophie, but Simon points out that Shelley died in a fire several years previously. Matthew returns to Shelley's flat and finds it burnt out; he realises that it was her ghost that helped him and Rebecca's ghost that gave him the drawing.

After spending the night out of the flat, Matthew returns home to find that his father has arranged for him to be re-committed to the psychiatric hospital. He runs away and hides in Shelley's burnt-out flat. While there, he has a vision showing him that it was Tom and Sophie's abductor who burned the flat down with Shelley and Rebecca inside, and he sees the name Ballan scratched on the floor. He realises that the priest is the killer.

He runs to the church to search for Tom and Sophie, telling Simon along the way that Ballan is the killer but that he doesn't expect Simon to believe him. He enters the crypt beneath the church and finds Sophie alive but very frightened. He starts to help her but is knocked out by Ballan. Meanwhile, Simon and Matthew's father have come to the church looking for Matthew. Ballan comes out and tells them he hasn't seen Matthew. Matthew's father is satisfied with this answer and leaves, but Simon is suspicious and enters the crypt. Ballan discovers and kills him. When Matthew comes to, he discovers Simon's body and flees, only to encounter Ballan (whose eyes flash red) who mockingly states Tom cried out for his brother, prompting an enraged Matthew to beat him with a rock. Once outside, he collapses and is taken to hospital.

When Matthew awakens in hospital, his father is there and tells him that Sophie is safe and sound, and that the bodies of both Tom and the real Adrian Ballan were found in the crypt—the killer was an impostor and has escaped, but the police are looking for him. Matthew looks again at the newspaper clipping Amy gave him, which is already several years old as it antedates the fire in Shelley's flat. Below the story about Shelley he sees another story reporting the suicide of a teenager—his friend Amy. He realises that it was Amy's ghost who was helping him all along. Tom is buried properly in the churchyard, and Matthew and his father visit his grave; Matthew also visits Amy's grave, which is located not far away in the same cemetery.

== Cast ==
- Matthew Ryan: Harry Treadaway
- Jake Ryan: Greg Wise
- Adrian Ballan: Alex Jennings
- Simon: Tom Felton
- Jason Saks: Finlay Robertson
- Shelley Cartwright: Nikki Amuka-Bird
- Amy Tyler: Ros Leeming
- Gang leader: Bronson Webb
- Sophie Pryor: Georgia Groome
- Tom Ryan: Lewis Lempereur-Palmer
- Edward Bryant: Jefferson Hall
- Rebecca Cartwright: Tyler Anthony
