= Noel's HQ =

- Genre: Talk
- Presented by: Noel Edmonds
- Country of origin: United Kingdom
- Original language: English
- No. of series: 1
- No. of episodes: 5 (inc. 1 pilot)

Production
- Production location: Fountain Studios
- Running time: 90 minutes (inc. adverts)
- Production company: Twofour

Original release
- Network: Sky1
- Release: 14 September 2008 – 14 February 2009

Noel's HQ was a British light entertainment programme that was broadcast by Sky1. Hosted by Noel Edmonds, the series featured segments discussing philanthropic efforts and political issues. A one-off pilot episode was broadcast live on 14 September 2008, and a full 5-part series was broadcast from 17 January to 14 February 2009.

== History ==
Noel's HQ was first announced as a pilot broadcast live 14 September 2008 on Sky1; the programme was billed as having a philanthropic purpose, and as being a "response to a broken Britain".

During a February 2009 episode featuring Joe Townsend, a soldier who had lost both of his legs after stepping on an IED while serving in Afghanistan, Edmonds intervened over a planning permission denial by Wealden District Council for a specially-adapted bungalow for his needs. During the segment, Edmonds launched a verbal tirade towards the council's press officer, Jim Van den Bos, disagreeing with their categorization of Noel's HQ as an "entertainment" programme in their refusal to speak to it. Edmonds also revealed that he did not accept payments for his role as host, and had been donating his per-episode salary to a charitable trust.

Following the broadcast, it was reported that Sky had edited approximately 20 seconds of the segment for repeat airings out of concerns for Ofcom regulations—a decision that led to conflicts between Edmonds and Sky over editorial control, and nearly prompted him to quit the programme.

In March 2009, Sky announced that it would not renew Noel's HQ for a second series.

== Format ==
The programme consisted of interviews and segments profiling and surprising people in need, performers of random acts of kindness, and the operators of charities, with prizes and expertise. It was described by an Independent writer as a "modern-day Jim'll Fix It".

The theme of a "broken Britain" was prevalent in its content, such as political correctness, bureaucracy and over-regulation, and overzealous health and safety initiatives.

== Reception ==
Writing for The Guardian, Charlie Brooker considered Noel's HQ to be "a cross between That's Life, Surprise Surprise, and some unmade episode of I'm Alan Partridge in which Alan snaps and runs into traffic with his shirt off, smashing windscreens with a cricket bat", and contained segments akin to a political rally where Edmonds "shouts about petty-minded local councils". Commenting upon the Townsend episode, Brooker drew comparisons to the film Network, and joked that he would eventually be performing live public executions of bureaucrats by gunging "while the audience fires pistols and Cheggers sticks heads on poles", or running for the "House Party".

Fellow Guardian writer Lucy Mangan jokingly described the programme as practicing a religion that "harnesses the intercessionary powers of celebrities to encourage community spirit and the charitable impulse", where "thou must declare every third-hand snippet of news about bureaucratic snafu as incontrovertible evidence of Bonkers Britain", and "corrupt and pervert every pure and humane impulse thou—or thou's research team—comes across by the addition of puking sentimentality and the meaningless benedictions of Nell McAndrew."
