= Lempereur =

Lempereur is a French surname. Notable people with the surname include:

- Dylan Lempereur (born 1998), French footballer
- Ingrid Lempereur (born 1969), Belgian swimmer
- Jean Lempereur (born 1938), French footballer
- Jérémy Lempereur (born 1987), French footballer
- Jérôme Lempereur (born 1973), French footballer
- Lewis Lempereur-Palmer (born 1996), English actor
- Martin Lempereur (died 1536), French printer and publisher
- Rachel Lempereur (1896–1980), French politician
