= Monet-Goyon =

- Industry: Motorcycles
- Founded: 1917
- Founder: Joseph Monet; Adrien Goyon
- Defunct: 1959
- Headquarters: Mâcon, France

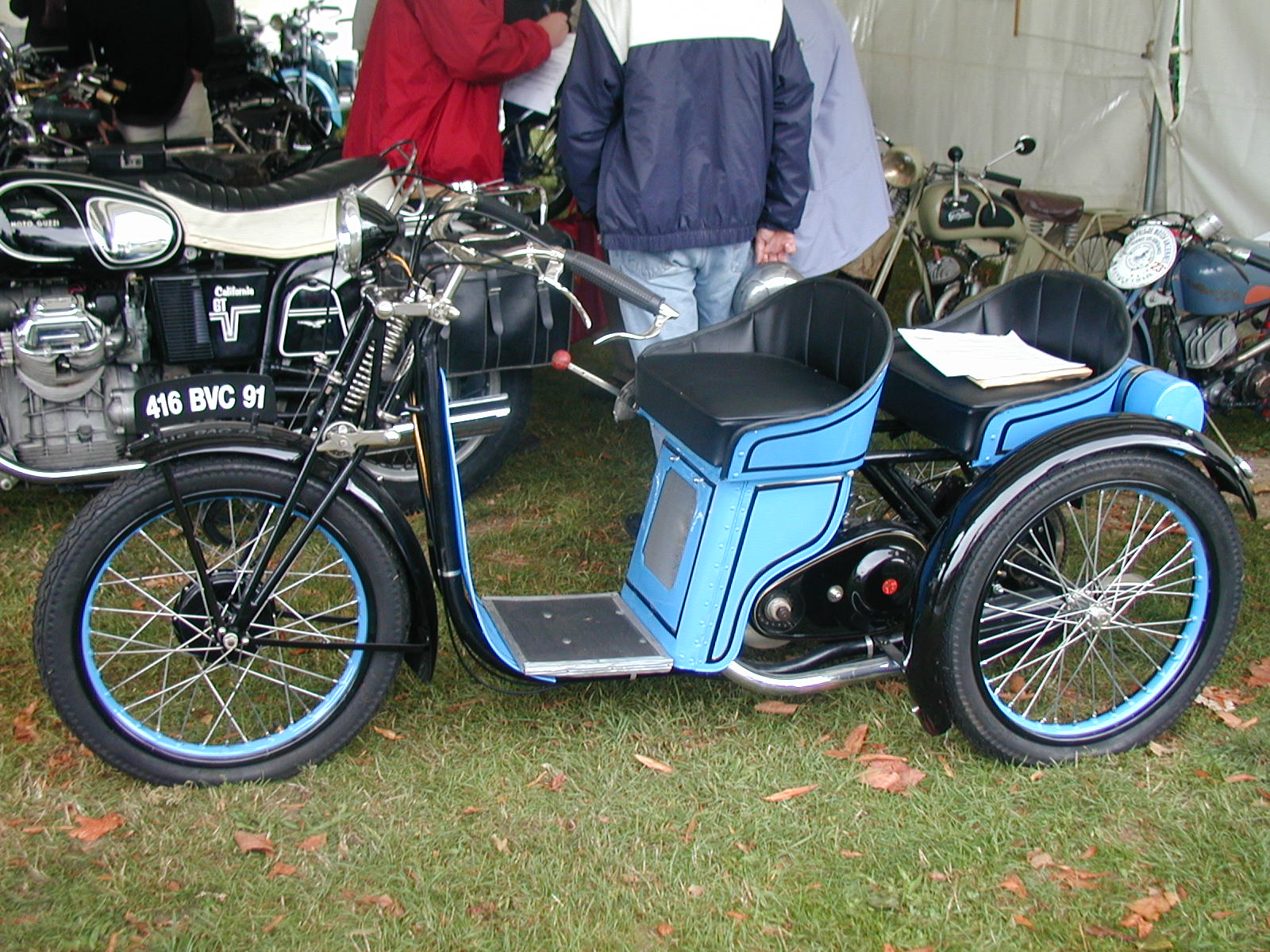
A Monet-Goyon Automouche.

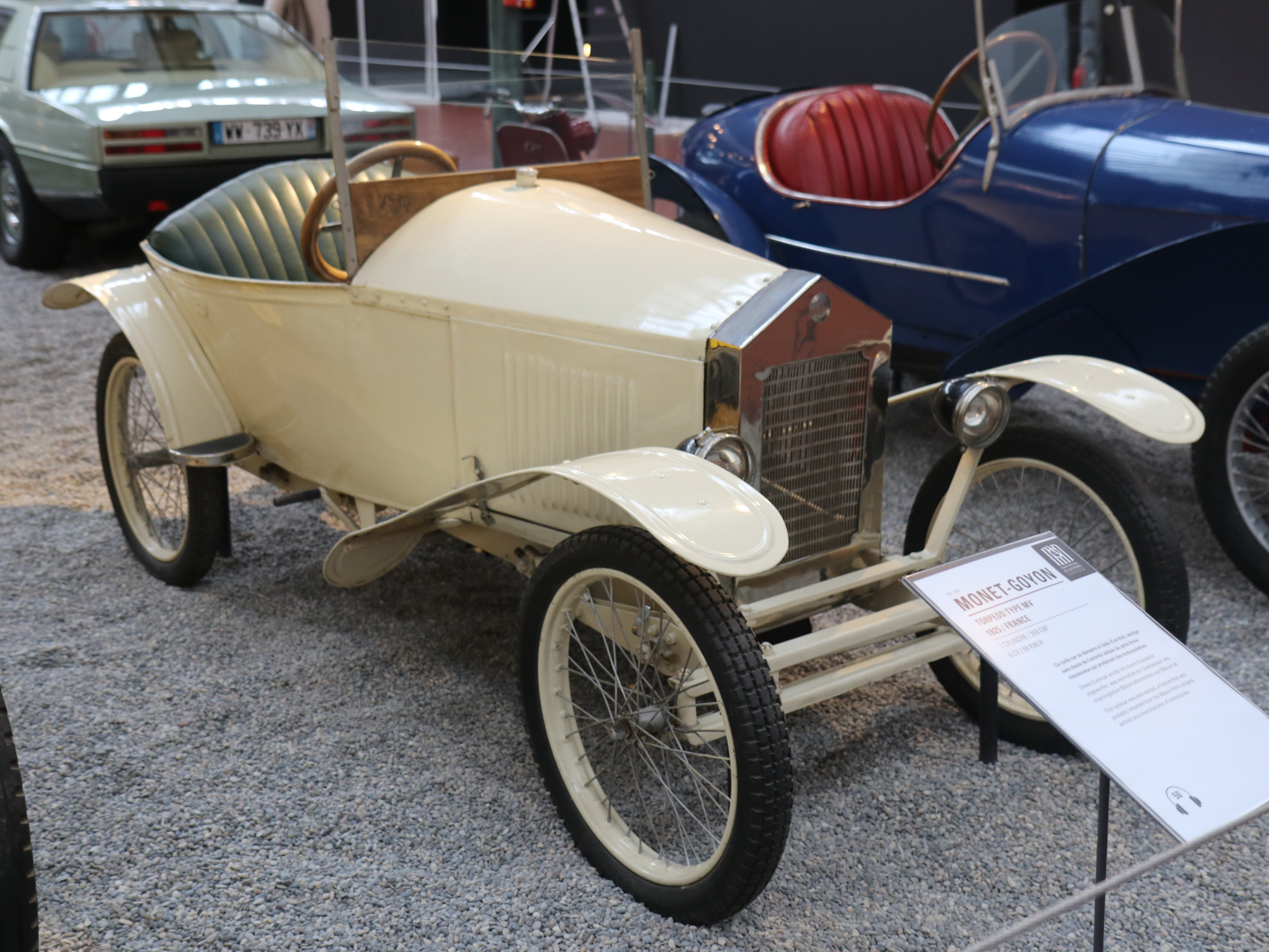
1925 Monet-Goyon Torpedo Type MV

Monet-Goyon was a French motorcycle manufacturer, founded in 1917 by the engineer Joseph Monet and his financial backer Adrien Goyon in Mâcon, France.
