= Social deprivation =

Lack of culturally normal interaction

Social deprivation is the reduction or prevention of culturally normal interaction between an individual and the rest of society. This social deprivation is included in a broad network of correlated factors that contribute to social exclusion; these factors include mental illness, poverty, poor education, and low socioeconomic status, norms and values.

Social disfavor is an uncommon synonym of social deprivation that some authors or scientific fields use.

Social isolation is a related but not identical concept that refers to the lack of social contacts and having few people to interact with regularly.

== Overview ==
The term "social deprivation" is slightly ambiguous and lacks a concrete definition. Social 'hunger' may be exacerbated by factors such as low socioeconomic status or low levels of educational attainment. The socially deprived may experience "a deprivation of basic capabilities due to a lack of freedom, rather than merely low income". This lack of freedoms may lead to decreased opportunities for societal advancement or exclusion from the political conversation.

Part of the confusion in defining social deprivation seems to stem from its apparent similarity to social exclusion. Social deprivation may be correlated with or contribute to social exclusion, which is when a member in a particular society is ostracized by other members of the society. The excluded member is denied access to the resources that allow for healthy social, economic, and political interaction. Pierson has identified five key factors that set social exclusion in motion – poverty, lack of access to jobs, denial of social supports or peer networks, exclusion from services, and negative attitude of the local neighborhood. It is also associated with abusive caretaking, developmental delay, mental illness, and subsequent suicide.

Although a person may be socially deprived or excluded, they will not necessarily develop mental illness or perpetuate the cycle of deprivation. Such groups and individuals may have completely normal development and retain a strong sense of community.

== Early development ==
Research on social deprivation is based primarily on observational and self-report measures. This has provided an understanding of how social deprivation is linked to lifespan development and mental illness.

=== Critical periods ===
A critical period refers to the window of time during which a human needs to experience a particular environmental stimulus for proper development to occur. In instances of social deprivation, particularly for children, social experiences tend to be less varied and development may be delayed or hindered. It is also considered a period in the life of an organism when a specific environmental experience leads to the greatest effect. Harvard research indicates that social deprivation can influence cognitive development, "leading to difficulties or delays in the development of language and executive functions including working memory, inhibitory control, and cognitive flexibility." It also can cause changes in the structure and function of brain networks (e.g., the fronto-parietal network) that support those cerebral functions, which appears to place children at risk of developing attention-deficit hyperactivity disorder (ADHD) as well as externalizing problems.

==== Feral children ====
In severe cases of social deprivation or exclusion, children may not be exposed to normal social experiences. If a child has limited exposure to language before a certain age, language is difficult or impossible to obtain. Social behaviors and certain physical developments also have critical periods, often resisting rehabilitation or later exposure to proper stimuli.

Feral children provide an example of the effects of severe social deprivation during critical developmental periods. There have been several recorded cases in history of children emerging from the wilderness in late childhood or early adolescence, having presumably been abandoned at an early age. These children had no language skills, limited social understanding, and could not be rehabilitated. Genie, a contemporary victim of social deprivation, had severely limited human contact from 20 months until 13.5 years of age. At the time of her discovery by social workers, Genie was unable to talk, chew solid foods, stand or walk properly, or control bodily functions and impulsive behaviours. Although Genie was able to learn individual words, she was never able to speak grammatical English. These children lacked important social and environmental conditions in childhood and were subsequently unable to develop into normal, functioning adults.

=== Brain development ===
Social deprivation in early childhood development can also cause neurocognitive deficits in the brain. Positron emission tomography (PET) scans reveal drastic reductions in areas such as the prefrontal cortex, temporal lobe, amygdala, hippocampus, and orbitofrontal gyrus of socially deprived children. These areas are associated with higher-order cognitive processing such as memory, emotion, thinking, and rationalization. Further damage occurs in the white matter of the uncinate fasciculus. This structure is responsible for providing a major pathway of communication between areas for higher cognitive and emotional functioning, such as the amygdala and frontal lobe. Having damage to these specific structures and their connections decreases cortical activity, thus inhibiting the ability to properly interact and relate to others.

Research also suggests that socially deprived children have imbalances with hormones associated with affiliative and positive social behaviour, specifically oxytocin and vasopressin. Institutionalized children showed a marked decrease in vasopressin and oxytocin levels while interacting with their caregivers compared to controls. Failure to receive proper social interaction at a young age disrupts normal neuroendocrine system developments that mediate social behaviour. Social deprivation leads to decreased dopamine D2 receptors. The dopamine system plays a role in changes in social behavior which in this case is caused by social deprivation.

== Mental illness ==
Limited social interaction can lead to eventual mental impairment. Participation in broader society can provide a sense of stability in people's lives, and socially deprived people are often excluded from the larger social structure. It becomes even more difficult for a person to fit in once labeled mentally ill because they now also carry social stigma and receive negative social feedback from the larger community.

Social deprivation is difficult to dissect because certain issues that may be considered outcomes of social exclusion may also be factored into causes of social stigma. Outcomes of adult social deprivation may include young parenthood, adult homelessness, lack of qualifications, or residence in social housing – yet all of these factors may cause society to treat the individual with disdain or intolerance, thus furthering their exclusion. These reciprocal influences can become an unfortunate cycle for an individual who requires social or financial assistance to survive, particularly in a society that excludes those who are deemed abnormal.

This apparent cycle of alienation can cause feelings of helplessness where the only foreseeable resolution may be suicide. There is an identified link between severe mental illness and subsequent suicide. One predictor of suicide is a lack of social integration. Dating back to the late nineteenth century, Durkheim illustrated that highly integrated societies with strong social bonds and a high degree of social cohesion have low suicide rates. Social integration consists of many sources such as religious, social, and political memberships. Relationships within the community and other individuals can create a better quality of life that decreases the chance of becoming mentally ill and committing suicide.

Over 500 studies have been screened and the conclusions show a strong correlation between social isolation and an increase in anxiety and depression. The social isolation of young people leads to higher levels of cortisol, a stress induced hormone, too much of which over a long period is associated with anxiety disorders.

== Socioeconomic factors ==
A lack of equal distribution of resources is fueled by an increasing economic gap. The focus of power on the upper status creates disparity and loss of privileges within the lower class. The lower socioeconomic statuses, in turn, become socially deprived based on the lack of access to freedoms. Loss of power is associated with a lack of opportunity and political voice, which restricts participation in the community. Non-participation in the labour market and lack of access to basic services reduces the inclusion of social relations. Social relations consist of events such as social activities, support in times of need, and ability to "get out and about". For these children, initial exposure to such events is incorporated within the education system.

Although there are many factors involved in social deprivation, research has indicated that the school system's intervention can allow at-risk children the chance to improve their status. A positive educational experience plays an important role in allowing such children to advance in society. The High/Scope Perry Preschool Project was implemented to research the results of providing preschool programs to socioeconomically disadvantaged children. A population of at-risk children was identified and randomly assigned to two groups: program or no program. The ultimate goal was to improve the selected children's quality of life through the educational system and later on as adults. Compared to students not enrolled in the program, students who were enrolled completed a longer high-school education, scored higher on tests of scholastic achievement and intellectual performance, had lower lifetime criminal arrest rates, and reported significantly higher monthly earnings as adults. These findings indicate that children who are experiencing non-educational social deprivation may benefit from a sensitive, positive educational experience.

== COVID-19 and social deprivation ==
During the COVID-19 pandemic people were forced to quarantine and therefore experienced social deprivation. While the pandemic was at its peak people needed to stay socially distanced and quarantined. This meant that people were forced to socially isolate leading to social deprivation. During and following this period there has been a spike in mental health issues and by using life theory scientists can predict that this will affect the social development of younger people later on in their lives.

== See also ==
- Ableism
- Agoraphobia
- Relative deprivation
- Social alienation
- Social exclusion
- Social isolation
- Solitary confinement
