= Gillet Herstal =

Belgian former car manufacturer

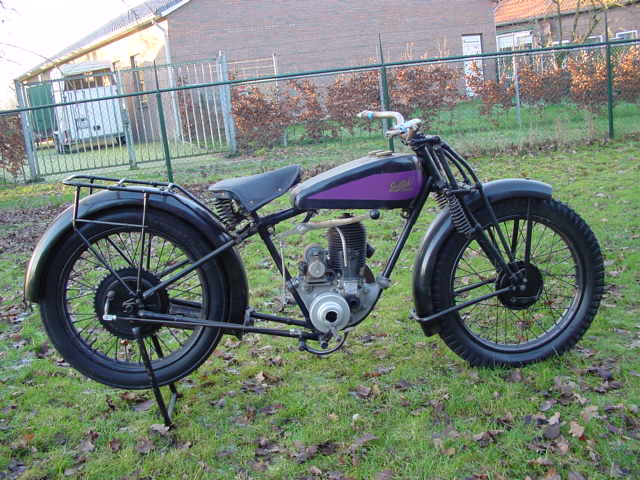
Gillet 1928 "Tour du monde"

Gillet Herstal was a Belgian manufacturer of motorcycles and automobiles based in Herstal.

== Company history ==
Started in 1919 as with the production of motorcycles, Gillet Herstal ended its production in 1959.

=== Automotive ===
From 1928 to 1929 Gillet Herstal produced a three-wheeled car, which was equipped with a motorcycle engine. On 22 September 1929 in Malle, one of these vehicles held the land speed record in the Cyclecar 500 category, the speed was 117.647 km/h.
