= Tabart =

Tabart is a surname. Notable people with the surname include:

- Benjamin Tabart (1767–1833), publisher and bookseller
- Deborah Tabart, environmentalist
- Jill Tabart (born 1941), cleric
- John Tabart (1827–1894), cricketer
- Pierre Tabart (1645–1716), composer
- Tom Tabart (1877–1950), cricketer
