= Lewis Lempereur-Palmer =

English actor (born 1996)

Lewis Lempereur-Palmer (born December 1996) is a young English actor. He has appeared in The Khomenko Family Chronicles staged at the Royal Court Theatre in 2007. His performance as a Ukrainian boy suffering from ill health owing to the fallout from the Chernobyl disaster won the praise of London's theatre critics, with The Stage calling it "a fantastically assured performance".
