= Edward Brown (barrister) =

English barrister

Mr Recorder Edward Brown KC
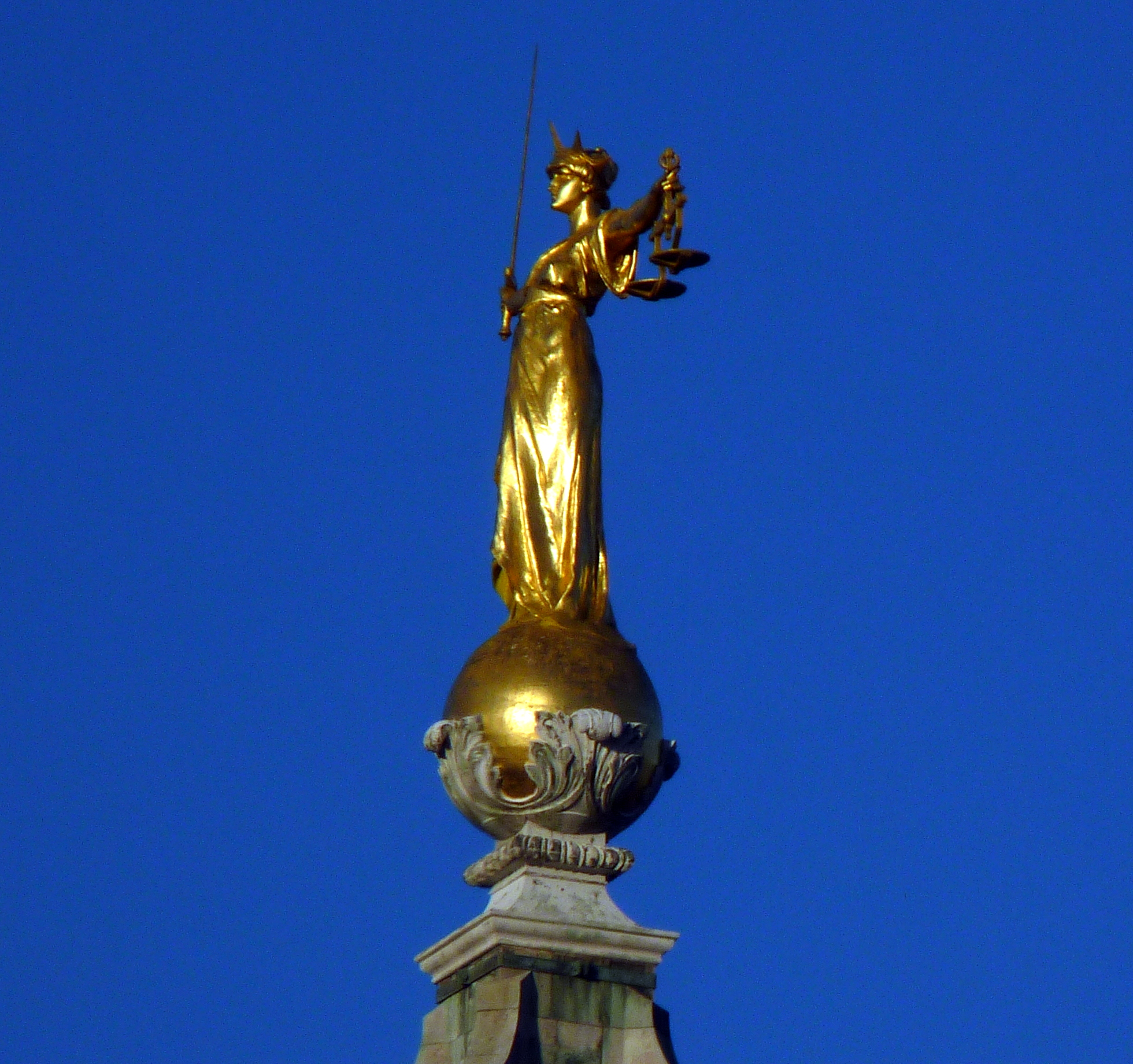
- F. W. Pomeroy's 1906 statue of Lady Justice on the dome of the Old Bailey (Central Criminal Court) in London.

Crown Court Recorder, Central Criminal Court
- Incumbent
- Assumed office 2001

Junior Treasury Counsel, Central Criminal Court
- In office September 2000 – February 2007

Senior Treasury Counsel, Central Criminal Court
- In office January 2007 – September 2014

Standing Counsel to the Serious Fraud Office
- Incumbent
- Assumed office September 2010

Personal details
- Born: Edward Francis Trevenen Brown; 6 January 1958 (age 68) London, England
- Occupation: Barrister at QEB Hollis Whiteman (chambers), Senior Treasury Counsel, Crown Court Recorder at Southwark Crown Court, member of UNMIK Detention Review Board, Trustee of Growing Against Violence charity
- Profession: Barrister
- Known for: Advocacy in high-profile criminal cases with international element
- Website: qebholliswhiteman.co.uk

Edward Francis Trevenen Brown KC (born January 1958) is an English barrister who specialises in international criminal law and human rights. He is one of the most senior prosecutors at the Old Bailey where he also served as a Recorder, as well as sitting as a part-time circuit judge at Southwark Crown Court. Brown has written extensively on gang violence and joint enterprise murder in The Times.

== Career at the Bar ==
Brown was called to the Bar in 1983. He currently practises at QEB Hollis Whiteman in London, chambers of Mark Ellison KC, where he heads the specialist criminal department. After beginning his career both prosecuting and defending, Brown specialised in prosecution work from 1986, including several cases of murder, terrorism and organised crime. He took silk (i.e. appointed Queen's Counsel) in 2008. For most of his career he has practised at the Old Bailey.

=== Appointments ===
In 2000 Brown was appointed Junior Treasury Counsel at the Old Bailey, where he served as a recorder from 2001. In 2007 he was appointed Senior Treasury Counsel, serving in that capacity until 2014. In 2015 Brown became a Bencher of Gray's Inn.

== Human rights ==
In 2014 Brown became a member of Detention Review Board of the United Nations Interim Administration Mission in Kosovo.

== Defence ==
Brown has represented the prosecution, corporate entities and individuals in allegations of corporate crime, corruption, corporate manslaughter and tax investigations. In 2009 Brown acted for Labour Party politicians in Cash for Peerages police inquiry - no charges against MP's were brought. In 2016 Brown was appointed as leading Counsel to represent the CPS at the Independent Inquiry into Child Sexual Abuse.

== Prosecution ==
Brown was instructed by the CPS in many of the highest profile British criminal cases including prosecution of Kevin Hutchinson-Foster who passed the BBM Bruni Model 92 handgun to Mark Duggan shortly before the minicab in which Duggan was travelling was stopped by police in Ferry Lane in Tottenham Hale.

Brown was also instructed in the inquest into Duggan's death. He prosecuted members of the GAS (Guns And Shanks) gang from Brixton who were charged with joint enterprise murder in a case of "vicious, shocking and sickening case of gang violence outside a school at a time when pupils and staff were gathering at the start of a school day", as well as Ben Hitchcock's murderers, whose actions were described as "the direct result of what was a pitched battle between rival gangs." Co-defendant Royston Thomas was found not guilty after police detectives relaunched an investigation into the stabbing of 16-year-old Ben Hitchcock. He prosecuted David Jeffs known as the "Mayfair socialite murder", child killer Ben Butler, hitman Jamie Marsh-Smith who was found guilty of murdering a gang boss, and MI5 official Katharine Gun in a widely publicised case involving MI5 and GCHQ.

=== R v Jogee ===
"The appeals by these two men have been used by the Supreme Court to address the problem and change the law. Though they might well have kept the law as it was.There will now be very many cases of applications to appeal against convictions out of time. They won't be confined to murder cases, but to all crime where there was a secondary party, so robberies, sexual crimes. That doesn't mean every case of so-called joint enterprise will be overturned, the justices have been pretty strong on that, particularly because the Court of Appeal on accepts cases out of time when there has been a serious injustice to a party. From today it doesn't automatically become a crime if you prove foresight by the secondary party. It's been found too low a test to be found guilty of a serious crime, but it is still available for a jury to use in deciding whether or not the party intended to encourage or assist the other to do it."

— Edward Brown QC"

In February 2016, Brown was interviewed by The Lawyer magazine to analyse R v Jogee that reversed previous case law on joint enterprise murder, after a recent Supreme Court ruling indicating that it was not right that a person could be convicted of murder and subsequently sentenced to life imprisonment if they foresaw the murder could take place but did not deliver the fatal blow. Brown commented: "It has always been the case that a person who intentionally assists another in a joint crime will be as guilty as the person who physically commits that crime. After the Chan Wing-Siu ruling in 1985, juries have since been directed that if a secondary party foresaw that the principal party might use a knife, for example, with intent to cause harm or murder, then they are guilty of murder as well." Brown also commented that the judgment in R v Jogee and Ruddock v The Queen will have a significant effect on the prosecution of multi-handed crime, and in particular cases of multi-handed serious violence that sometimes results in death. It will also result in many applications for leave to appeal against conviction out of time.

=== Kevin Hutchinson-Foster ===
"On August 4 last year a handgun was recovered in Ferry Lane in Tottenham, north London. It had been in the possession of a man named Mark Duggan. The gun was loaded - it had a bullet in its magazine. The evidence demonstrates that that gun at that scene had been passed to Mark Duggan by this defendant, Kevin Hutchinson-Foster, shortly before the minicab in which Mark Duggan was travelling was stopped by police in Ferry Lane in Tottenham Hale. There in Ferry Lane Mark Duggan was shot and fatally injured by the police as a result of his possession of that gun and what he was thought to be about to do with it. The firearm was a BBM Bruni Model 92 handgun. It had been modified so that it would fire 9mm bullets - a lethal firearm as you will hear. The charge this defendant faces is the supply or transfer of that gun to Mark Duggan."

— Edward Brown QC, Prosecutor.

On 18 September 2012, Brown started prosecuting Kevin Hutchinson-Foster whose trial took place in Snaresbrook Crown Court. Duggan was shot dead while police officers were trying to arrest him in Tottenham, north London last August. The jury heard that the handgun allegedly supplied by Hutchinson-Foster was found near the spot where Duggan was shot. Giving evidence, Hutchinson-Foster who was accused of passing the gun to Mark Duggan, claimed Duggan already had a gun. Hutchinson-Foster is accused of "selling or transferring" a BBM Bruni Model 92 handgun to Duggan contrary to the Firearms Act 1968, between 28 July and 5 August 2011. Hutchinson-Foster was found guilty of supplying a gun to Duggan. Chief Supt Dean Haydon, from the Metropolitan Police's Trident Serious Crime Command, said:

The Kevin Hutchinson-Foster trial has primarily been about the supply of an illegal firearm and I welcome the verdict of the jury in this case today.

=== Shanks and Guns gang ===
In 2011 Brown prosecuted two south London gangs known as Shanks and Guns, or SG, and the Black Mafia, also known as the Sydenham Boys. Gang members were found guilty of murder of Nicholas "Nick" Pearton who was thought to be their friend. In May 2011 Pearton, 17 year old schoolboy, was stabbed by gangsters being caught up in a clash between two gangs in Home Park, Sydenham. Pearton was attacked when he went to the park to help gangsters who he thought were his friends, after receiving a call from them. The jury at the Old Bailey saw CCTV footage from the Kentucky Fried Chicken shop of an injured Nicholas running in and collapsing. Prosecuting, Brown commented that Pearton was "the only white-skinned male participant in the incident" when he was chased and eventually killed by a pack of "animals." The court heard that hours earlier, Pearton's so-called friend, a member of Black Mafia gang known as the Sydenham Boys, had been involved in a row at school which led to a confrontation in the park between the two gangs. Brown told the jury:

Moments after Pearton arrived at the park, his so-called friends had evaporated and he was left to face the attackers on his own. In the eyes of the attackers however, he remained a member of the rival Black Mafia gang.

Pearton's father said he suffers 'overwhelming guilt' and 'emptiness' since his son's murder. Only one out of ten gangsters was identified as stabbing Pearton. The others claimed they had been wrongly convicted of murder and manslaughter. Belgian national Edward Conteh was convicted of Pearton's murder and deported after his conviction under joint enterprise law, whilst not being present at the scene. But Judge Anthony Morris said they had all taken part in "a terrifying example of gang violence". Morris also said not enough was being done to raise awareness of the consequences of gang violence. When the police commented that they already had a programme, Judge Morris said:

It seems to me the message is not getting through to them and that we are not addressing a major issue.

=== R v Hanad Mohammed ===
In 2016 Brown started prosecuting Hamad Mohammad and three of his associates who were accused of joint enterprise murder. Ionut Lazar, 28, was found shot dead in Shepherd's Bush on 22 October 2016 two days after arriving in the UK from Romania. Lazar, 28, was killed after "a number of men" forced their way into a home in Shepherd's Bush, west London Police were called to Askew Road, W11 on 22 October at 2.40am to reports of an unconscious male at a residential property in Askew Road. Lazar was found suffering from what was initially thought to be a stab wound to the chest. He died at the scene a short while later. A post-mortem examination took place 24 October at Fulham Mortuary and established the cause of death as a bullet wound to the chest.

=== Gintare Suminaite ===
In January 2017 Brown prosecuted Gintare Suminaite, 29-year-old mother from Crawley, West Sussex, who was charged with murder of her newborn child. Prosecuting, Brown told the jury that the child was the product of Suminaite's secret affair with a fellow Lithuanian. Suminaite kept her pregnancy hidden from authorities and her long-term partner, with whom she already had a young child. She attended a hearing at Crawley magistrates' court but did not enter a plea to the murder charge. Suminaite told police she "most likely" intended to kill her baby, but said she did not know why. At the trial held at the Old Bailey she pleaded guilty to a charge of infanticide. The court heard that on 5 April 2016, Suminaite left work early saying she had "big problems" and gave birth in the bathroom at home, with her partner in another room. Her partner found Suminaite lying naked in the bathroom surrounded by blood and a baby bath full of what appeared to be clothes.

Jurors at the Old Bailey heard that Suminaite was bleeding and pale when found by her boyfriend who eventually called an ambulance after she confessed what had happened. The court heard that the child lay undiscovered as medics initially did not spot the body in the baby bath and the couple did not mention it. Suminaite was subsequently treated in hospital for significant blood loss and injury from childbirth. Following her arrest, Suminaite said she strangled her baby with her lingerie, but did not know why. She described giving birth quickly and easily and said the baby was moving and trying to cry. Suminaite told the jury she cut the umbilical cord with a razor then passed out in the bath. When she came to pick the baby up, she said the baby was not moving and she tied a pair of her knickers around her neck and put her in the baby bath. She said she did not know why she did it as she had no mental problems. Emergency services were called to her home on Aldwick Road in Bognor. At the hearing, Mr Justice Nicol said that Suminaite's circumstances were "tragic in themselves". Sentencing Suminaite, he said:

The unlawful homicide of anyone is a tragedy, especially in the case when the victim is so young, even more so that is the case when the child dies at the hands of her mother. However, your own circumstances were tragic in themselves and that is reflected in the nature of the offence to which you have pleaded guilty. You were overwhelmed by the stress of your situation and in a state of partial denial during the pregnancy. At the time of giving birth your were in a state of extreme anxiety and panic amounting to a temporary impairment of the balance of your mind.

Suminaite followed proceedings with the aid of a translator as English was not her first language. In his closing speech Brown acknowledged that Suminaite been emotionally and socially isolated during her life in England. Suminaite was sentenced to a 24-month community order with a rehabilitation requirement order. At the completion of the trial Mr Justice Nicol said:

The courts recognise in circumstances such as this, where there is no underlying psychiatric illness, where there is a low risk of re-offending or causing harm, that what might otherwise be thought of as lenient is the appropriate course, namely a non-custodial sentence.

=== Jason Marshall ===
In August 2017, Brown prosecuted male escort Jason Marshall who murdered his client Peter Fasoli who he met in December 2012 through the social networking site Badoo, where he advertised his services under his "working" name "Gabriel". Marshal, who pretended to be an MI6 agent, was filmed by a computer repairman Peter Fasolli who he murdered in a bondage sex session after which he tried to kill another man while on the run in Italy. Marshall was arrested after the Fasoli's relative found hidden footage of killing on his laptop. Peter Fasoli, a 58-year-old IT expert, who lived in a bungalow located near RAF Northolt was terrorised and murdered in 2013 at his own house by Marshall who was called over for an hour of a bondage sex session. On the opening day of his trial at the Old Bailey, Marshall was described as a "calculating and determined" killer. The court heard that during sexual roleplay, Marshall stripped the victim and arrested him for "being a spy" and hacking into a government laptop, the court heard. Fasoli was threatened with a knife and forced to hand over his cash card pin numbers. The footage shows Marshall, 28, calmly standing over the body of his client Peter Fasoli and signing "in the name of the father, the son and the Holy Ghost" in Latin, after killing him. Marshall subsequently set fire to Fasoli's home in attempt to make Fasoli's death look like an accident.

"The fire, in the early hours of January 7, 2013, had been intended to hide a terrible crime. The fire was set by this defendant in an attempt to disguise what truly happened, and the defendant Jason Marshall very nearly succeeded in escaping justice. Peter Fasoli was killed, intentionally. He had been subjected to a calculated and determined attack, by this defendant whom he invited into his home. In the end he literally fought for his life but by the time Mr Fasoli fully understood the true motives of the person who had tricked his way into his home, it was too late. Desperate as his attempts were, he could do nothing - as you will all too graphically come to understand."

— Edward Brown QC, Prosecutor.

But two years later when Fasoli's nephew was sorting through his belongings, he was horrified to discover a computer file containing CCTV footage of the entire event. The court heard how Marshall, who denied murder, first got in contact with Peter Fasoli in December 2012 through social networking site Badoo, inviting to set up a treesome and inventing the persona of a policeman. Prosecuting, Mr Brown told jurors:

There is a telling feature of this case - whilst the defendant sought to tempt the deceased into thinking their encounter that night was to be sexual in nature, the sexual element of the night's events played only a short part early on and soon was superseded by physical domination and then violence.

The Old Baily heard that Marshall arrived at the Fasoli's home at around 7pm on 6 January 2012, pretending to be a police officer kitted out with a police utility belt, handcuffs and a pistol holster. During sexual role play, Marshall stripped the victim and arrested him for "being a spy" and hacking into a Government laptop, the court heard.

After Marshall fled the scene, he sent a "calculated and cynical" message to Fasoli on the Badoo chat line apologising for not seeing him the night before. He withdrew £750 in cash from the Fasoli's bank account and used his card to buy a flight to Rome. In February 2016 Marshal was arrested in Italy and extradited to United Kingdom to face trial for murder of Fasoli he committed four years ago. A Metropolitan Police spokesman commented:

Detectives investigating the murder of a man in Northolt in 2013 have arrested and charged a man on suspicion of his murder. He will appear in custody at Hendon Magistrates' Court today. The investigation into Mr Fasoli's murder was started on 10 November 2014 by officers from the Homicide and Serious Crime Command, after new evidence was passed to the MPS. Mr Fasoli, aged 58, died on Monday, 7 January 2013 after he was brought out of his burning flat in Rubens Road, Northolt.

The court has heard that Fasoli accidentally filmed his own bondage sex session murder at the hands of Jason Marshall dressed as policeman. Jurors at the Old Bailey watched footage of Fasoli begging for his life as he was attacked by fantasist Marshall while classical music played in the background. Camera footage showed Fasioli becoming visibly distressed as he was gagged and bound on his bed. He was threatened with a large hunting knife and forced to hand over his cash card pin numbers, the court heard. Prosecuting, Brown told the jury:

Fasoli's postmortem examination initially gave the cause of death as inhalation of fire fumes, but a re-examination found that Fasoli was still alive when the fire was set. Restraint and asphyxia also contributed to Fasoli's death.

The court heard that during psychological evaluation Marshall told the psychiatrists that he is an incarnation of Archangel Gabriel and stated "You can't judge me, only God can judge me." In September 2017 Jason Marshall was imprisoned for 39 years for the murder of Peter Fasoli. He has previously been convicted in the UK of impersonating MI5 and transport police officials while carrying out searches and of issuing fines on the Tube.

=== SFO ===
- In 2016 Brown represented Serious Fraud Office in a widely publicised case involving four former Barclays executives who were charged with fraud. and unlawful financial assistance over a $3 billion loan the bank made to Qatar's finance and economy ministry.
- In 2017 Brown acted as a district attorney for the SFO in the Barclays case which was among the most high-profile cases ever to be brought by the SFO.

== Trusteeships and patronages ==
In 2011 Brown became a trustee of the Growing Against Violence, charity that delivers programmes in schools that address gang exploitation and seeks to educate young people and draw them away from gangs and violence. Brown also gave lectures to young south London gang members on law of joint enterprise and on the dangers of gang violence.

== Notable appearances ==
=== Guilty by Association ===
In September 2015 Brown, in his capacity of Senior Treasury Counsel, appeared on Guilty by Association, a BBC One documentary that examines law of joint enterprise. The programme raised questions about how the courts deal with gang violence, what constitutes a murder and whether young people are being sentenced for crimes they did not commit. Documentary follows Alex and his family as he is charged under the joint enterprise law and examines the increasing controversy surrounding the details of this law which some believe is creating criminals of the innocent.

== See also ==
- List of Supreme Court of Judicature cases
- Protection from Harassment Act 1997
