= The Met: Policing London =

- Genre: Factual
- Narrated by: Lennie James (Series 1-3) Rosalind Eleazar (Series 4)
- Composer: Miguel d'Oliveira
- Country of origin: United Kingdom
- No. of series: 4
- No. of episodes: 23

Production
- Executive producer: Aysha Rafaele
- Production locations: London, UK
- Running time: 60 minutes
- Production companies: BBC Documentaries; BBC Studios Documentary Unit

Original release
- Network: BBC One; BBC iPlayer
- Release: 8 June 2015 – 28 November 2023

The Met: Policing London is a British documentary television series about the Metropolitan Police service. As of 8 June 2015 it is being broadcast on BBC One. The series shows how the Met works from Bernard Hogan-Howe, and later Cressida Dick, the Commissioner of Police of the Metropolis, to police officers. The Met is produced by BBC Documentaries who have previously made Our War, an award-winning series about British soldiers in Afghanistan, and Protecting Our Children, about social services.

The first series, comprising five episodes, began broadcasting on BBC One on Monday 8 June 2015.

The documentary was renewed for a second series, which finished filming in March 2017. The second series – which also comprises five episodes – premiered on 24 May 2017.

The third series first aired on 3 October 2019, and runs for 7 episodes.

== Production ==
Charlotte Moore, the controller of BBC One, announced the series on 23 October 2013. She called it the "first ever definitive portrait of the Met" and said documentaries like The Met were "at the heart of BBC One's remit". The series will be made by BBC Documentaries and will consist of six, hour-long episodes.

Bernard Hogan-Howe, the head of London's Metropolitan Police Service, said he was delighted to be working with the BBC and also said:

I hope that over the coming months, we can reveal the true scale and complexity of the challenges faced by officers and staff across the service as they meet the demands of modern policing—and at a time when we are going through a period of unprecedented change. I am proud of the Met. I hope this documentary helps the people of London learn more about policing and be proud of us too.

The series was commissioned by Charlotte Moore and Emma Willis, the head of documentary commissioning for the BBC. The executive producer for the series is Aysha Rafaele, the head of documentaries for the BBC.

== Episodes ==
Series overview

		Originally aired	
Series	Episodes	First aired	Last aired
1	5	8 June 2015	6 July 2015
2	5	24 May 2017	21 June 2017
3	7	3 Oct 2019	14 Nov 2019
4	6	22 Oct 2023	28 Nov 2023

Series 1
Episode	Synopsis	Original air date
1	The killing by a Met officer of a young black man called Mark Duggan sparked the 2011 riots. Now an inquiry is about to decide if the killing was lawful.	8 June 2015
2	Mistaken identity leaves a young father dead and detectives struggling to catch his killers. Brixton CID hunt a violent sexual offender before he attacks again, and Notting Hill Carnival sees London's biggest police operation.	15 June 2015
3	Trident tackle drug dealers in south London. Police in Camden are overwhelmed by violent moped-enabled attacks.	22 June 2015
4	From abusive drunks to high-value robberies, tackling the city's crime is different after dark.	29 June 2015
5	A new recruit learns his way around, and Camden officers deal with the highs and lows of policing the public.	6 July 2015

Series 2
Episode	Synopsis	Original air date
1	A recently qualified response driver gets his first chase, and a huge impromptu summer party descends into chaos.	24 May 2017
2	One of the Met's most experienced officers leads his team through London to intercept a car suspected of carrying a gun.	31 May 2017
3	In Hackney, detectives investigate a spate of stabbings. And the Flying Squad attempt to catch masked gunmen in south east London.	7 June 2017
4	A look at London's busiest custody suite, the case of the Croydon cat-killer and the policing of one of the city's biggest protests.	14 June 2017
5	Detectives investigate the murder of an elderly man in north London, and police are on the hunt for Ealing's most wanted burglars.	21 Jun 2017

Series 3
Episode	Synopsis	Original air date
1	Detectives investigate a case of rape by a stranger. The Territorial Support Group deal with knife crime in London. CID search for a suspect after a man is robbed at gunpoint.	3 October 2019
2	2018 saw the highest murder rate in London in over a decade. This episode follows the investigations into two of these killings.	10 October 2019
3	A specialist unit tries to tackle moped crime, and at the Notting Hill carnival police introduce a controversial tactic.	17 October 2019
4	Detectives are on the hunt for a serial burglar in south London, and the murder team are called in when a man is beaten to death outside a pub.	24 October 2019
5	A man is found slumped in a passage way with a single stab wound. Police deal with an allegation of domestic and financial abuse, and officers go to the aid of a frequent caller.	31 October 2019
6	The murder investigation team are called in after a violent attack on a bus. Meanwhile, the Met prepare for Donald Trump's first visit to the UK.	7 November 2019
7	A man is attacked and dies in Trafalgar Square, the Trident team try to dismantle one of London's most dangerous gangs, and response officers have to deal with a drunk driver.	14 November 2019

Series 4
Episode	Synopsis	Original air date
1	Detectives investigate the murder of a 17-year-old boy and gather evidence against a human trafficking gang, as public trust in the Met reaches a record low.	22 October 2023
2	Detectives search for a missing young woman. After discovering CCTV footage of her going into a storage container with a man but never emerging, they fear she has been murdered.	31 October 2023
3	Detectives investigate the murder of a homeless man who has been beaten to death in a London park and the rape of a young woman by a stranger on the street.	7 November 2023
4	Detectives investigate the fatal stabbing of a motorcycle stuntman on a music video shoot. A manhunt team searches for a suspect on the run, accused of raping a 12-year-old girl.	14 November 2023
5	An elderly couple are burgled and attacked in their home. The police call in the Flying Squad, an elite unit of covert officers who launch an operation to catch the perpetrators.	21 November 2023
6	Detectives hunt for a man who has been sexually assaulting women in North London for two years, and investigate the mugging of an 87-year-old woman.	28 November 2023
