= List of cases of police brutality in the United Kingdom =

This is a list of cases of police brutality in the United Kingdom.

== National ==
- 1984–1985: The UK miners' strike led to confrontations between striking miners and police in northern England and south Wales. A widely reported clash at the Orgreave Coking Plant near Rotherham on 18 June 1984, with around 5,000 on each side, was dubbed 'The Battle of Orgreave'. Violence flared after police on horse-back charged the miners with truncheons drawn and inflicted serious injuries upon several individuals. In 1991, the South Yorkshire Police were forced to pay out £425,000 to thirty-nine miners who were arrested in the events at the incident. Other less well known, but also bloody, police attacks took place, for example, in Maltby, South Yorkshire.
- 2010: Policing of the student protests included the controversial technique of kettling. At the Whitehall march on 24 November mounted police's use of horses for crowd control was described by others present as a "charge". A journalist at the Parliament Square protest on 9 December characterised the police tactics as "very heavy-handed".

== England ==
- 1936: the Battle of Cable Street was a major clash between the police, who were attempting to protect a rally by Oswald Mosley's British Union of Fascists, and about 20,000 anti-fascist protestors. Mounted police charged at the crowd, and many of the arrested demonstrators reported harsh treatment at the hands of the police. Police were among the 175 people injured in the confrontation.
- 1974: the death of Kevin Gately occurred during the Red Lion Square disorders. Gately and other students were marching with the International Marxist Group when the latter tried to break a police cordon separating the demonstration from a National Front march.
- 1974: the Windsor Free Festival was broken up by police. Nicholas Albery and others successfully sued the Chief Constable for creating a riotous situation in which the Thames Valley Police attacked the plaintiffs.
- 1979: Blair Peach was fatally assaulted by an officer of the Special Patrol Group (SPG) during an anti-racism demonstration in London. A police investigation into the SPG found that they had a cache of unauthorised weapons. The Metropolitan Police reached an out-of-court settlement with Peach's family in 1989. The police eventually published their internal report in 2010, concluding that Peach had probably been killed by an officer, but officers within that unit had refused to identify the culprit.
- 1985: the so-called Battle of the Beanfield occurred in Wiltshire when police attempted to stop a convoy of New Age travellers from reaching Stonehenge. After a stand-off, police attacked both vehicles and people, smashing windows and beating travellers on the head with truncheons. A court judgement six years later found the police guilty of wrongful arrest, assault and criminal damage.
- 1994: Richard O'Brien died in Metropolitan Police custody. He was arrested while drunk, and held face down in a police van. An inquest returned a verdict of unlawful killing, but three officers charged with manslaughter were acquitted.
- 1998: Christopher Alder died at the Queen's Gardens police station from asphyxiation. He was arrested for breach of the peace at Hull Royal Infirmary. Footage of Christopher, lying handcuffed and half-naked on the floor of a police cell, surrounded by five officers is available online. An inquest returned a verdict of unlawful killing, but the five officers charged with manslaughter were acquitted.
- 1999: Harry Stanley was shot dead by Metropolitan Police, thinking he was armed, although he was found to be carrying only a table leg. The coroner controversially returned an open verdict. The Crown Prosecution Service accepted the police's assertion that they were acting in self-defence.
- 2009: policing at the 2009 G-20 London summit protests included the technique of kettling. A bystander, Ian Tomlinson, died shortly after being pushed to the ground by a police officer. An inquest found that Tomlinson was unlawfully killed. An officer in the Metropolitan Police's Territorial Support Group was charged with manslaughter, but found not guilty.
- 2016: former footballer Dalian Atkinson was killed when PC Benjamin Monk tasered him for 33 seconds and kicked him in the head. A criminal trial acquitted Monk of murder but convicted him of manslaughter, the first time in thirty years a British police officer had been convicted of manslaughter.
- In May 2019 Metropolitan PC Benjamin Kemp CS was approached by an unnamed child with mental health issues seeking help. He CS sprayed her and beat her more than 30 times with a baton. He was dismissed and did not face any criminal charges.
- On 28 February 2021, PC Steven Martin was suspended for punching a handcuffed black teenager while the teenager was on the ground. Martin also verbally abused the teen and called him a "scumbag". He was ultimately convicted of common assault and dismissed from the police force.
- In March 2021, Officer Wayne Couzens kidnapped and murdered Sarah Everard as she was returning from shopping, detaining her for allegedly breaching Covid rules. Couzens was arrested and then sentenced to life in jail.
- In a 2024 Manchester Airport brawl, a police officer was removed from frontline duty after footage showing him kicking a man in the face during an arrest went viral.

== Northern Ireland ==
- 24 March 1922: McMahon killings – six Irish Catholic civilians in Belfast were shot dead and two wounded by policemen of the Ulster Special Constabulary (USC). All but one of the dead were members of the McMahon family. The Specials broke into their house at night and shot all eight males inside. It is believed to have been a reprisal for the IRA's killing of two policemen the day before.
- 1 April 1922: Arnon Street killings – in Belfast, Special Constables broke into several homes and shot or beat six Catholic civilians to death, including a young boy. This was in revenge for the killing of a policeman by the IRA.
- 19 May 1922: In revenge for the burning of a Protestant-owned mill, a mob of Ulster Special Constables and loyalists attacked and burned many Catholic homes and businesses in Desertmartin, Northern Ireland. Special Constables took four Catholic men from their homes nearby, lined them up by the roadside and summarily executed them.
- 23 June 1922: A group of Ulster Special Constables opened fire on civilians in the village of Cushendall, Northern Ireland, while preparing to enforce a nightly curfew. Special Constables killed three young Catholic men by shooting them at close range. They claimed they were ambushed by the IRA and returned fire, but a British government inquiry concluded that this was not true. The report was not made public for almost a century.
- 19 April 1969: During rioting between Irish nationalists and the Royal Ulster Constabulary (RUC) in Derry, officers broke into the home of Catholic civilian Samuel Devenny (42), who was not involved in the riots. The officers beat Devenny ferociously with batons. His young daughter (who was recovering from surgery) and a family friend were beaten unconscious. His older daughter and son were also attacked. It is believed the attack led to Devenny's death on 17 July 1969.
- 14–15 August 1969: During the 1969 Northern Ireland riots, the Royal Ulster Constabulary (RUC) shot dead five Catholic civilians and opened-fire on crowds of Irish nationalist protesters. Patrick Rooney a 9-year-old boy was killed when police fired on a block of flats with Browning machine guns.
- 1970s: During Operation Demetrius, the Northern Ireland government, and then the British government under direct rule, used interrogation practices known as the five techniques. These methods were adopted by the RUC with training and advice regarding their use coming from senior intelligence officials in the United Kingdom Government.
- 1981: three people were killed by plastic bullets fired by the Royal Ulster Constabulary (RUC) in Northern Ireland during the 1981 Irish hunger strike protests,
- 1997: mass protests led to fierce riots and gun battles in nationalist districts of Northern Ireland in early July. In the last spell of widespread violence before the signing of the Good Friday Agreement in April 1998, the RUC and British Army were forced to withdraw entirely from some nationalist areas of Belfast. It was sparked by official permission for an Orange Order march in Portadown, and the RUC's aggressive removal of nationalist protesters who had been blocking the march (the Drumcree conflict). A US citizen, John Helmsworth, was assaulted by an RUC riot squad in the falls area of Belfast, and died six months later from a brain hemorrhage as a consequence of the beating.

=== Drumcree conflict ===
The Drumcree conflict is a dispute over a yearly parade in Portadown. Inter-communal violence has repeatedly occurred since 1873. Years in which brutality on the part of the RUC has been recorded include:

- 1972: British troops and the RUC bulldozed barricades and used CS gas and rubber bullets on those protesting against the march.
- 1985: police forcefully removed protesters and allowed the march to continue; at least one man was beaten unconscious.
- 1986: the RUC banned a march, but rioting flamed between residents and the RUC; locals felt that RUC officers had "mutinied" and refused to enforce the ban.
- 1996: After some years of relative calm, rioting returned as police violently removed protestors from Garvaghy Road, often after beating them. Nationalist leaders stated that their people had lost all faith in the impartiality of the RUC.

== Wales ==
- 1911: The Llanelli railway strike was brutally suppressed by the police, and two strikers were shot dead by soldiers.

== See also ==
Category:Deaths in police custody in the United Kingdom
