= Keith Cutler =

British judge

Keith Cutler, CBE is a Senior Circuit Judge

He has been the Resident Judge of Winchester and Salisbury since 2009. He was called to the Bar (Lincoln's Inn) in 1972. Cutler was appointed to be an Assistant Deputy Coroner for the purposes of conducting the inquest into the death of Mark Duggan on 4 August 2011. He has served as Secretary and then as President of the Council of Circuit Judges (COCJ). Cutler accepted the award of Commander of the British Empire in the 2010 New Years Honours List and has been a lay canon of Salisbury Cathedral since 2009. Once he was called for jury service and denied exemption despite telling officials he was actually the judge presiding over the case.

== Honours ==
=== Commonwealth honours ===
Commonwealth honours

Country	Date	Appointment	Post-nominal letters
United Kingdom	2010 – Present	Commander of the Order of the British Empire (Civil Division)	CBE

=== Scholastic ===
Honorary degrees

Location	Date	School	Degree	Gave Commencement Address
England	October 2019	University of Winchester	Doctor of Laws (LL.D)	

== Personal life ==
Keith Cutler has two children.
