= Adrian Darbishire =

British barrister

Adrian Munro Darbishire KC (born 11 November 1966) is a British barrister. He was Joint Head of Chambers at QEB Hollis Whiteman from May 2021 to May 2026.

He was educated at Charterhouse, Balliol College, Oxford (MA English Literature, 1988), City St George's, University of London (diploma in law), and King's College London (LLM, 1994). He was called to the bar at Lincoln's Inn in 1993. He was appointed a Queen's Counsel in 2012.
