= 2024 Manchester Airport brawl =

Event on 23 July 2024

- Location: Manchester Airport, Greater Manchester, United Kingdom
- Date: 23 July 2024
- Attack type: Punching by fist
- Deaths: 0
- Injuries: 3
- Victims: Officer Ward, Officer Cook, passenger Abdulkareem Ismaeil
- Assailant: Mohammed Amaaz
- Verdict: Guilty (Amaaz)
- Convictions: Assault (Amaaz)

On 23 July 2024, a brawl broke out at Manchester Airport in England. The fight involved two brothers, Mohammed Fahir Amaaz and Muhammad Amaad, and three Greater Manchester Police officers, whom the brothers allegedly assaulted. The brothers claimed they were acting in self-defence, however CCTV which is now available disproves this. Amaaz was convicted of assault occasioning actual bodily harm against PC Lydia Ward, assault of an emergency worker by beating PC Ellie Cook, as well as assault by beating Abdulkareem Ismaeil, a member of the public, in an earlier incident at the airport, by a jury at Liverpool Crown Court in 2025. In 2026, he was sentenced to three and a half years in prison. Amaad was not convicted of any offence after a trial ending 30 July 2025, and a retrial ending 20 May 2026.

Police attended the airport's car park following reports of an altercation between the brothers and another man. Acting on a description of the alleged perpetrators, officers attempted to handcuff Amaaz. Both brothers started punching the police, kicking and punching the officers multiple times. Amaad surrendered, and Amaaz was subdued by taser. Both men were taken into custody on the scene. The incident was captured on CCTV camera and police body cameras.

The initial footage of the incident appeared to show an armed officer stomping and kicking the head of Amaaz, who was lying on the ground after being subdued. Greater Manchester Police were accused of racism, and a protest was held in response. The officer was temporarily suspended from his job. Footage of the full incident was later released online. Three officers were injured as a result of the incident, and misinformation about officers' injuries and Islamophobic comments were made online.

The initial footage received widespread coverage in media. British political figures reacted to the incident on social media. Reform UK member Lee Anderson showed his support for the officer who kicked the man in the head. Reform UK said that they would initiate a private prosecution of the men if GMP refused to file charges against them. Prime minister Keir Starmer also reacted to the incident.

== Incident ==
=== Altercation ===
On 23 July at approximately 7:20 p.m., a fight was reported involving multiple passengers of Qatar Airways flight QR023 in Manchester Airport. A second call about the altercation was made at 8:20 p.m., claiming it had occurred in the Starbucks of the airport's terminal two. A third call about the incident was made at 8:30 p.m. in the car park area of the airport. The police arrived to the scene and found the two brothers, 25 year-old Muhammed Amaad, 20 year-old Mohammed Fahir Amaaz, as well as the mother of the duo, 56 year-old Shameem Akhtar.

The altercation was caused by an argument that ensued between the brothers and Abdulkareem Ismaeil, who was headbutted and punched twice by one of the brothers after being accused of abusing their mother. Police officers Lydia Ward and Zachary Marsden were informed over the radio that the brother who headbutted Ismaeil was wearing a blue tracksuit. The officers headed to the terminal's car park payment station to make an arrest. The officers tried to move Amaaz away from the payment station in order to handcuff him, but he resisted. As they were struggling, Amaad started attacking the officers, kicking and punching officer Marsden six times. Amaaz broke free from the police and started attacking them, delivering ten punches to multiple officers, including one to the face of Ward. Amaaz put his arm on Marsden's neck from behind as he fell on the ground, resulting in Marsden deploying a taser against him.

Footage from the scene also showed Amaaz striking firearms officer Cook two times with his elbow before being tased. As he was on the ground, Marsden kicked him in the head. Marsden justified this action in court, saying Amaaz was not listening to his commands to put his arms behind his back and was trying to get up so he had to "stun" him by striking his face. While the officer was kicking Amaaz's face, some bystanders were heard shouting; "stop kicking people," another said; "move back". Amaaz's mother tried to protect him by shielding his head with her hand. A nearby bystander filming the event was pepper sprayed.

=== Immediate aftermath ===
Body camera footage from the scene showed Ward, who was unarmed during the fight, crying as blood dripped from her face. It was later confirmed that she suffered a broken nose. In total, four men, including the two brothers, were arrested at the airport. Three officers were injured and suffered various head injuries. A CT scan after incident revealed that Amaaz suffered a cyst on his brain. His lawyer said that he was "fighting for his life" in the hospital. Akhtar was also injured during the fight. Her injuries were reportedly caused by her being whipped by a taser that started a bleeding in her cheek.

=== Brothers' narrative ===
In August 2024, Amaaz, Amaad, Akhtar, and their lawyer Aamer Anwar held a press conference and spoke with journalists. Anwar claimed that the initial incident between the brothers and the other passenger, Ismaeil, was precipitated by the latter verbally abusing Akhtar in Doha and on the flight. He claimed Akhtar's sons were present to pick her and her six-year-old grandson up from the airport. Amaaz and Amaad confronted the man, resulting in an argument. The family then went to the car park to pay for a parking space, where they encountered police. Anwar claimed the police grabbed Amaaz by the head and slammed him into the ticket machine, without making an attempt to communicate with him. The officer then allegedly grabbed his neck, to which Amaad asked the officer to stop but was punched twice and tased. Amaaz ran at the officers but was also tased and fell. His head was then stomped on by the officer. The officer then kicked Amaad before whipping his head with a taser. The lawyer stated one officer told Amaad: "You dirty fucking cunt, you think you can hit my officers. I am going to kill you when I see you, in my uniform or out". He said Akhtar had been hit with the taser in the face during the scuffle and started bleeding from her cheek, she fell to the ground and remained here before being helped by a stranger.

== Legal proceedings ==
=== Pre-trial ===
The Independent Office for Police Conduct (IOPC) made a statement on 25 July 2024, saying that they had opened a criminal investigation and intended to interrogate the officer who kicked the man in the head "as soon as possible". The statement noted that the investigation did not mean they would pursue criminal charges against the officers. Greater Manchester Police (GMP) said the arrested brothers were released after being bailed, but gave no information on their health. GMP described the incident as "truly shocking". One of the officers involved was suspended from his duties, and a second was investigated for assault.

On 26 July, Akhmed Yakoob, lawyer of the brothers' family, was interviewed by LBC News. He compared the incident to an "attempted assassination". That phrase, along with him claiming Amaaz was "fighting for his life", caused him to face criticism. On 29 July, he announced his withdrawal from his position, claiming the media tried to "sabotage" him. Yakoob was charged with money laundering in July, with the court saying he "wanted help to launder cash of millions of pounds".

On 1 August 2024, a lawyer representing the brothers contacted the IOPC to file a complaint against the officers. On 8 August, the IOPC began investigating an officer for gross misconduct and assault. On 20 December 2024, the Crown Prosecution Service (CPS) charged the brothers with multiple crimes. Amaaz was charged with two counts of "causing actual bodily harm", one count of "assaulting an emergency worker" and one count of "common assault" while Amaad was charged with one count of "causing actual bodily harm". The CPS had decided that they would not charge any officers involved in the incident as they doubted they had enough evidence.

=== Trial ===
On 5 July 2025, the first day of the trial began in Liverpool Crown Court. The jury was shown videos of the incident as evidence, and the brothers told the jury that they were acting in self defence. In a court hearing on 9 July, pictures of injuries that the brothers' mother suffered were shown to the court. Marsden was present in the courtroom and stated that there was no evidence that his actions caused the injuries. He said that Amaad may have accidentally punched her during the scuffle. During a hearing on 10 July, Ward told the court that she was "absolutely terrified" after being punched by the brothers and that she never experienced such violence in her life. During a hearing on 24 July, the prosecutor said the brothers used a "high level of violence" against the officers, and that one of them being kicked was irrelevant to their actions.

On 31 July, Amaaz was found guilty of assaulting Ward, Cook and Ismaeil. He was not convicted of assaulting Marsden because jurors could not agree on a verdict. The jury was not able to reach an agreement on Amaad's assault charge either, and the brothers were set to be retried on the charges in the future. Following the verdict, Amaaz was arrested in the courtroom, where he was then taken to jail to await his sentence.

In August 2025, leaked CCTV camera footage of the altercation was made public by Manchester Evening News. The footage was longer than the previous one and showed more context behind the incident. That same month, the IOPC confirmed that they had started a criminal investigation into an officer who allegedly leaked the video. Mayor Andy Burnham said he was concerned about the legality of releasing the footage to the public. In response to the investigation, an op-ed by MEN writer Sarah Lester was published, saying that investigating the alleged leak is a "bad decision" and that many high-profile figures of the Manchester community and police were grateful for the video and thanked the newspaper.

A retrial concluded on 20 May 2026, with the jury failing to reach a verdict on the allegation that Amaaz and Amaad assaulted Marsden. The CPS declined to attempt a third trial of the same charges. This meant that Amaad was cleared of all charges, and Amaaz would be sentenced for the assault of Cook and Ward.

=== Sentencing ===
On 26 June 2026, Amaaz appeared at Liverpool Crown Court for sentencing. Sergeant Lydia Ward (a PC at the time of the brawl) read a victim impact statement including the words "I want you to take a good look at me... You chose to attack a female. You knocked me to the ground with one punch, with so much force you broke my nose. How would you feel if a male did that to your mother? How would you feel if it was your mother standing here today explaining how she was violently assaulted by a male? What you did was cowardly." A statement on behalf of PC Ellie Cook was read by a lawyer, “I don’t think you will ever begin to understand what you have done to me, or my family. I used to be happy. I used to be driven. I used to be focused. I am now broken.” She added “It pains me to say this, but because of what you have done to me, I have decided to give up being a firearms officer. This means my dream of becoming a close protection officer is on hold, and I may have to come to terms with the fact that it may not happen.” Mr Justice Neil Flewitt described Amaaz's assaults on both Ward and Cook as 'prolonged and unprovoked'. He sentenced him to 3 and a half years in prison.

== Reactions ==
=== Political figures and organisations ===
Two days after the incident, far-right activist Tommy Robinson and politician George Galloway posted the footage of the incident on the internet. Politician Lee Anderson of Reform UK supported the officer and said he would "give him a medal". The Muslim Council of Britain and Muslim Engagement and Development condemned the incident. Paul Waugh, member of parliament for the family's location of Rochdale, said he spoke with family members of the brothers and condemned the involved police. Mayor of Greater Manchester, Andy Burnham urged the protesters to remain calm, describing the incident as "complicated" that has "issues for both sides." He later discussed the incident with the IOPC and Home Secretary Yvette Cooper of the Labour Party.

Prime Minister Keir Starmer also reacted to the incident, saying he watched the footage and "understands the public's concern". Shaista Gohir called the incident an "example of police brutality". On 7 October 2024, multiple parliament members of Reform UK said that they would crowdfund a private prosecution of Amaaz and Amaad if the police decided not to press charges against them. Lawyer Akhmed Yakoob responded to Reform UK's comments, saying; "If Reform want to pursue a private prosecution, I for one would gladly see them lose thousands of pounds".

=== Social media and misinformation ===
Footage of the incident was released to the public days after the incident and quickly became popular on social media. Users showed largely negative reactions, condemning the officers and accusing them of police brutality. Misinformation was later spread on Twitter, Instagram and Facebook. One example was a post claiming to show a photo of female officer's nose injuries from the brawl. The photo was real but was taken in 2020 in Leicestershire during a separate incident where a female officer was also punched in the face. One post featuring the misleading photo gathered 600,000 views. The photo had been reposted more than a hundred times on Twitter and Facebook. Islamophobic comments were also made, with one user blaming "the religion of peace" for the officers' injuries. In August 2024, the family of the brothers claimed they experienced "racist and Islamophobic" attacks on social media and are "traumatised".

A Facebook comment criticising the brothers made by a 56 year-old Preston College teacher led to an investigation and ultimately being fired from his job for "gross misconduct." He sued the college in response. Leader of Reform UK, Nigel Farage, had condemned the "misinformation" linked with the incident. The party's officials said GMP did not release the footage of the altercation immediately in order to create a "false impression" of officers attacking the brothers first, leading to protests of the false accusations and misinformation against them. In September 2025, a Twitter post, viewed 740,000 times, complained about how Mohammed Amaaz was not in prison. Reuters rated the claim as "missing context", as Amaaz was not serving a prison sentence but was in pre-trial detention awaiting his next court hearing.

=== Reaction by victims ===
The injured policewomen gave victim impact statements at Amaaz's sentencing hearing, condemning the attack and criticising how the narrative was weaponised against the police.

Lydia Ward, now promoted to a Sergeant, said she was “angered” by how Amaaz initially “played the victim” when “only part of the footage was out in the public”. She added “You are not a victim, I am the one who was injured, not you. You had the whole world listening to you and you showed no remorse. Not one ounce. You allowed the public to feel sorry for you. You made out like we had done something wrong when all we were doing was our job.” Reflecting on her injuries, she said “I look at myself now and I can see the difference in my face compared to how it was before this happened. You did that to me. You changed my face… I fear for the women in your life. If you can do that to a female police officer, what are you capable of to the women you know?"

PC Cook stated “I remember feeling punches in quick succession and with such power behind them that I thought I was being attacked by 3-4 people. I was terrified. I quickly thought I’m in a bad place and I don’t know how to get out of it. The pain was excruciating with each blow, my vision went black, and I was so disorientated”. She added “I am traumatised by the incident and what you did that day. I hate that we were judged by everyone. We were just doing a job; we were trying to protect the public”.

=== Other ===
The initial video footage released of the altercation received worldwide recognition, with news outlets like CNN, Al Jazeera, and 1News covering the story. On 25 July 2024, a protest in response to the incident was organised near a GMP police station; over 200 people participated. The protesters shouted "GMP shame on you". They held signs reading "GMP is racist" and "Black Lives Matter". Dal Babu, former police superintendent, was interviewed by BBC Radio 4. He said that the officers used excessive force and racism may have influenced their actions.

== See also ==
- List of cases of police brutality in the United Kingdom
- Greater Manchester Police#GMP incidents and investigations
