= Killing of Mark Duggan =

British Mixed-race man shot and killed by police in 2011

- Duggan
- Date: 4 August 2011
- Time: 18:15 BST
- Location: Tottenham Hale, London, England; 51°35′17″N 0°03′32″W
- Participants: Metropolitan Police Service, Mark Duggan
- Deaths: 1 (Duggan)
- Injuries: 1 (police officer)
- Inquiries: Independent Police Complaints Commission
- Inquest: 16 September 2013 – 8 January 2014
- Coroner: Keith Cutler
- Verdict: Lawful killing

Mark Duggan, a 29-year-old British man from London, was shot dead by police in Tottenham, on 4 August 2011. The Metropolitan Police stated that officers were attempting to arrest Duggan on suspicion of planning an attack and that he was in possession of a handgun. Duggan died from a gunshot wound to the chest. The circumstances of Duggan's death resulted in public protests in Tottenham, which led to conflict with police and escalated into riots across London and other English cities.

Duggan was under investigation by Operation Trident, an anti-crime project conducted by the Metropolitan Police. He was aware of this and texted the message "Trident have jammed me" moments before the incident.

He was known to be in possession of a BBM Bruni Model 92 handgun, a blank-firing replica of a Beretta 92 pistol, converted to fire live rounds. This had been given to him by Kevin Hutchinson-Foster 15 minutes before he was shot. At an initial trial of Hutchinson-Foster in September–October 2012 the jury failed to reach a verdict. At a re-trial on 31 January 2013 Hutchinson-Foster was convicted of supplying Duggan with the gun and jailed. In August 2013 the Independent Police Complaints Commission (IPCC) said its investigation had substantially ended and that they had found no evidence of criminality by the police. A public inquest on the Duggan death began on 16 September 2013, and ended on 8 January 2014 with an 8–2 majority concluding that Duggan's death was a lawful killing.

Conflicting accounts of the events leading up to Duggan's death were provided by the Metropolitan Police, attracting criticism and suspicion from invested parties and other supporters. These critics accused police of misconduct and of failing to cooperate with those investigating Duggan's death.

== Background ==
=== Mark Duggan ===
Mark Duggan was born on 15 September 1981 and grew up in Broadwater Farm, North London. His parents were of mixed Irish and African-Caribbean descent. Between the ages of 12 and 17, he lived with his maternal aunt Carole in Manchester. His maternal aunt Julie was married to Manchester gangland boss Desmond Noonan.

Duggan had children aged 10 years, 7 years, and 18 months with his long-term partner Semone Wilson, had fathered a fourth child with a second woman, and a fifth child, born posthumously, with a third woman. Duggan had worked at Stansted Airport, and had applied for a job as a firefighter, according to his cousin. Duggan's son, Kemani, is a member of the UK drill collective OFB going by the moniker Bandokay.

==== Alleged and actual criminal activity ====
Duggan on the right, with cousin Kelvin Easton

According to Tony Thompson of the Evening Standard, London edition, Duggan may have been a founding member of North London's "Star Gang", an offshoot of the Tottenham Mandem gang. Unnamed police sources alleged via The Daily Telegraph that Duggan was a "well known gangster" and a "major player and well known to the police in Tottenham".

Officers attached to Operation Trident had Duggan under surveillance; police stated that they suspected Duggan was planning to commit a crime in retaliation for the killing of his cousin, Kelvin Easton, who was stabbed to death outside a bar in East London in March 2011. Duggan was described as having been increasingly paranoid as a consequence of his cousin's death. The Daily Telegraph alleged that Duggan was bound to avenge his cousin's death by the "street code" of the gang.

After Duggan's death, he was alleged to be a drug dealer by reports. Duggan's family said that Duggan was "not a gang member and he had no criminal record". The inquest into his death was told that he had been convicted of cannabis possession and handling stolen goods. His fiancée said he had spent time on remand.

== Shooting ==
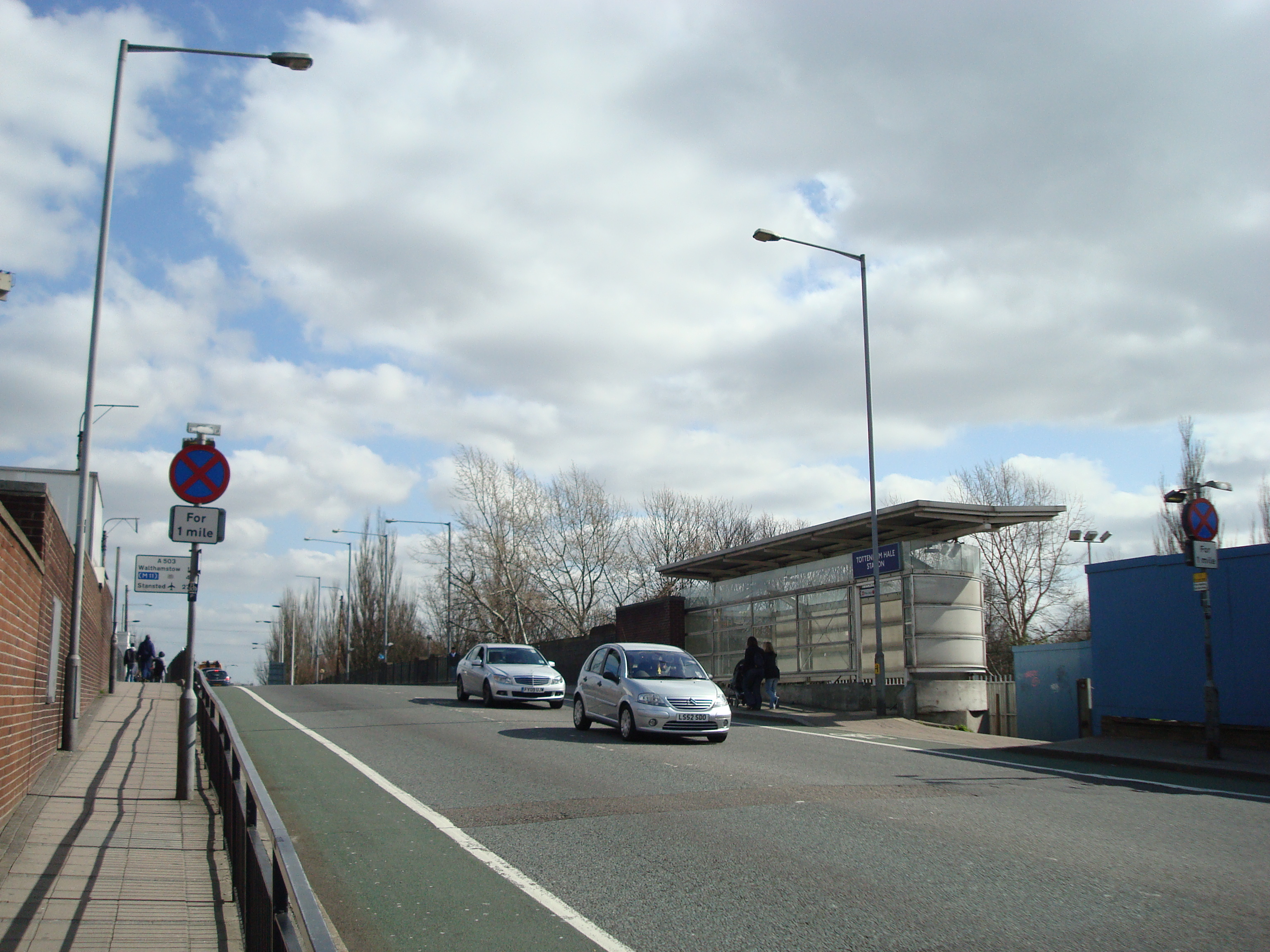
Ferry Lane, Tottenham Hale, location of the shooting

Officers of the Metropolitan Police Service stopped a minicab which was carrying Duggan as a passenger at about 18:15 BST on 4 August 2011. There was no CCTV coverage of the place where they stopped the cab.

According to an unnamed firearms officer at the trial of Kevin Hutchinson-Foster in September 2012, Duggan pivoted out of the cab and pulled a selfloading pistol or handgun from his waistband. According to the taxi driver, who was granted anonymity at the subsequent inquest, Duggan left the car and ran:

The car that had stopped – men got out of it very quickly who were carrying guns in their hands. Then I heard the sound of my rear door opening. I saw that Mark Duggan got out and ran. At the same time, I heard firing from the front. I saw shots strike Mark Duggan. He fell to the ground. 'Mark Duggan only got 2ft–3ft from my car when he was shot'.
At the same time a man came and he opened my door. Very angrily he pulled me out by my arm and then he dropped me or knelt me down on the ground by the rear tyres of the car.

The taxi driver told the inquest that an armed officer had threatened to shoot him if he did not stop looking at where Duggan had fallen to the ground and was being handled "quite harsh[ly] and callous[ly]" by officers.

The police fired twice, hitting Duggan in the biceps and chest, killing him. A firearm was found at the scene. Paramedics from the London Ambulance Service and medical staff from London's Air Ambulance attended, but Duggan was pronounced dead at the scene at 18:41 BST.

The police who shot Duggan were part of the Specialist Firearms Command (CO19), accompanying officers from Operation Trident.

According to one eyewitness cited by The Independent, Duggan "was shot while he was pinned to the floor by police". According to another eyewitness cited in The Telegraph, a police officer had "shouted to the man to stop 'a couple of times', but he had not heeded the warning". According to a witness cited by the BBC, a police officer twice shouted: "Put it down" before Duggan was shot. However, the taxi driver who was travelling with Duggan told the inquest the police shouted no warning before shooting. A Metropolitan Police Federation representative asserted that the officer who killed Duggan had "an honest-held belief that he was in imminent danger of him and his colleagues being shot".

One of the officers who had surrounded Duggan was hit by a bullet, which lodged in his radio. It had been fired by the policeman identified only as V53 and had passed through Duggan's arm and then hit the officer. The shot policeman was taken to a hospital and discharged the same evening.

=== Subsequent police actions ===
Police proceeded to move the taxi in which Duggan had been travelling. After some dispute over when the vehicle was moved, it was stated that police moved the taxi for examination and then returned it to the scene. A local equality advocate said that the IPCC initially had no knowledge of these events, but later stated that it had sanctioned removal of the vehicle and then requested that it be restored to the scene.

An initial "short-form" report of the incident – filed by an officer identified as "W70" – did not say that Duggan had raised a gun. W70 filed another report 48 hours later which described Duggan drawing a gun from his waistband. Officer W70 later testified that short-form reports are "deliberately brief".

Police did not inform Duggan's family of his death until a day and a half after he was killed. The police later apologised for this delay.

=== IPCC explanations ===
Initially, a spokesman of the Independent Police Complaints Commission (IPCC) stated that they "understand the officer was shot first before [Duggan] was shot"; police later called this statement a mistake. A bullet was found embedded in a radio worn by a policeman, and ballistics tests on the projectile indicate it was a "jacketed round", or police issue bullet fired from a Heckler & Koch MP5 semi-automatic carbine used by the police. Its presence may have been due to a ricochet or overpenetration.

On 18 November 2011, the IPCC announced that the 9mm gun associated with the scene of the killing had been found 10–14 feet (3.0–4.3 m) away, on the other side of a fence. QC Michael Mansfield, barrister for the Duggan family, told the IPCC that witnesses had told him they saw police throw the gun over the fence. The IPCC initially reported that three officers had also witnessed an officer throw the gun, but later retracted this report.

The IPCC had commissioned tests on the pistol by the Forensic Science Service and had received advice that it was an illegal firearm. The gun was wrapped in a sock, a practice allegedly used to avoid leaving evidence if it was used. The IPCC announced on 9 August that there was no evidence that the gun had been fired, that this had not been ruled out and further tests were being conducted.

It was also announced on 18 November 2011 that the IPCC would investigate whether the same gun had been used in an incident six days earlier, on 29 July 2011, when barber Peter Osadebay was assaulted in Hackney by 30-year-old Kevin Hutchinson-Foster after Hutchinson-Foster brandished a gun. On 31 January 2013, Kevin Hutchinson-Foster was found guilty of supplying the gun to Duggan, during which he admitted using the same weapon to beat Osadebay. Duggan's fingerprints were found on a cardboard box, which appeared to have contained the gun when he collected it. The sock, with the gun inside, was found out of this box as much as 20 feet (6.1 m) away from where Duggan was shot. Neither his DNA nor fingerprints were found on the sock which wrapped the gun, nor on the weapon itself. Additional tests found no gunshot residue on Duggan.

== Aftermath ==
News of Duggan's death was publicised quickly. Soon after Duggan was shot, an image was posted on Facebook showing police standing over a body that may have been his. Outrage about the police killing quickly escalated.

=== Protest and unrest ===
==== Tension with police ====
There was a long history of tension between black communities and the police before and since the Broadwater Farm riot in 1985, in which, according to David Lammy, Labour MP for Tottenham, the "cracks that already existed between the police and the community became deep fissures". Since 1985 "there had been some progress made in the relationship between the local community and the police", but the shooting "raised tension". Lammy stated that Duggan's death occurred as part of "a history in Tottenham that involves deaths in police custody". Claudia Webbe, the chairperson of Operation Trident, asserted that many black people see Duggan's shooting as "yet another unjust death in custody" and that young black people in Tottenham are "still six, seven, eight times more likely to be stopped and searched than their white counterparts".

Black British novelist Alex Wheatle, who served a term of imprisonment for crimes he committed in the 1981 Brixton riot, asserted that there was "a deep aggravation" that despite many black deaths in police custody there had never been a conviction of a police officer.

==== Riots ====
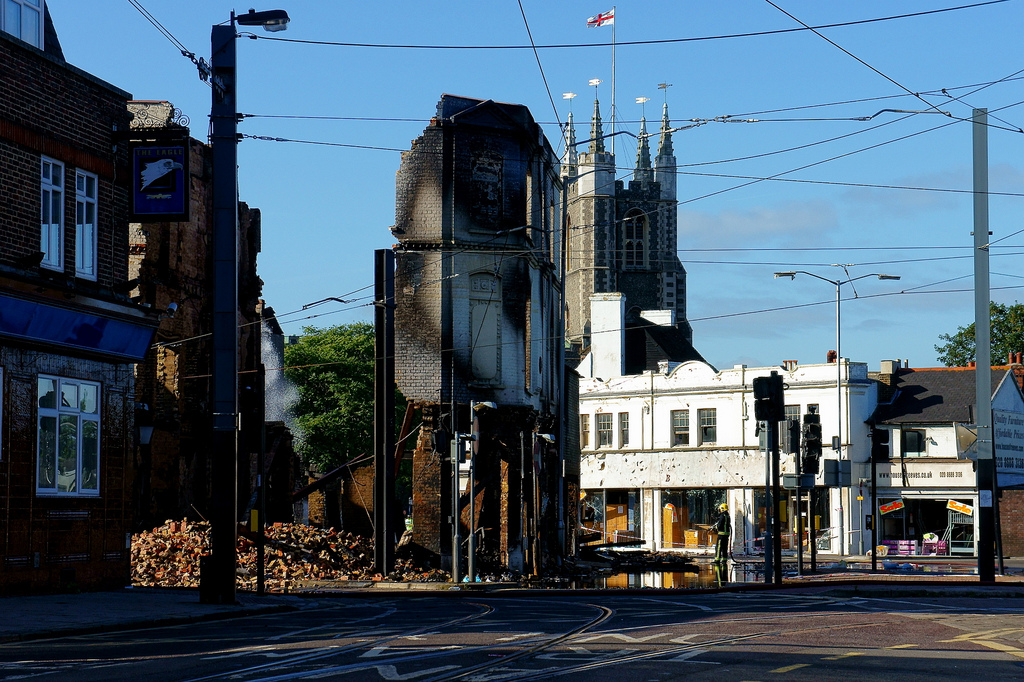
The remains of the House of Reeves furniture store in Croydon after it was destroyed in an arson attack during the 2011 England riots, which broke out in the events following Duggan's death

At about 17:30 BST on 6 August 2011, Duggan's relatives and local residents marched from Broadwater Farm to Tottenham Police Station. The demonstrators chanted "we want answers" and requested information from police about the circumstances of Duggan's death. They also made broader demands for "Justice", seeking to publicise ongoing poor relations with police in their community.

A chief inspector spoke with the demonstrators, who demanded to see a higher-ranking officer. About 20:00 BST, a 16-year-old girl approached them and may have thrown a leaflet or a stone. Police swarmed the girl with shields and batons, allegedly causing head injuries. At about 20:20 BST, members of the waiting crowd attacked two nearby police cars, setting them on fire. According to Metropolitan Police Commander Adrian Hanstock, the violence was started by "certain elements, who were not involved with the vigil". Other observers state that the rally began peacefully but was incited by the police attack.

Rioting, arson and looting spread to other parts of London, and to elsewhere in England. Rioters expressed mixed motivations for rioting, including policing issues, poverty, and racial tension with police.

Duggan's family condemned the disorder. His older brother said, "We're not condoning any kind of actions like that at all." While Duggan's shooting was perhaps the trigger for the violence, several other causes of the rioting have been suggested. Then British Prime Minister David Cameron rejected a causal relationship between the death of Duggan and the subsequent looting.

=== Media coverage ===
Duggan's death quickly became a major media story. Initially the media including the BBC incorrectly reported that one shot was 'discharged from an illegal firearm inside the car'. The Independent stated on 8 January 2014: "The authorities wrongly said that he had been hit in an exchange of fire".

Some of the media were criticized for portraying Duggan as a gangster, confused by his criminal record being reported as either extensive or non-existent by different outlets. The media was faulted for uncritically reporting the police's story that Duggan had shot first – also shown to be false.

The riots brought international attention to Duggan's death, which one Iranian official described as a "human rights violation".

=== Funeral ===
Duggan's funeral took place at New Testament Church of God in Wood Green on 9 September 2011. The funeral procession was watched by thousands of onlookers. Police maintained a low profile.

== Investigations ==
=== IPCC ===
The incident was immediately referred to the Independent Police Complaints Commission (IPCC), in accordance with standard practice when anyone dies or is seriously injured following police contact. Investigators distributed leaflets appealing for witnesses to come forward. IPCC officers also searched CCTV footage, 999 calls and radio transmissions.

On 12 August 2011 the IPCC announced that in the immediate aftermath of the incident they may have given misleading information to journalists to the effect that shots were exchanged between Duggan and the police. Although a bullet had been found lodged in a police radio, there was no evidence that it had come from the gun in Duggan's possession.

In response to rumours that the killing of Duggan was an "execution", the IPCC announced: "Speculation that Mark Duggan was 'assassinated' in an execution style involving a number of shots to the head are categorically untrue."

Duggan's family stated that they did not trust the IPCC to conduct a fair and independent investigation of the killing and asked for an independent inquiry into the relationship between the Metropolitan Police and the IPCC. They sought to commission an independent second postmortem. Coroner Andrew Walker scheduled an initial hearing for 12 December 2011.

In November 2011, two members of the "community reference group" appointed by the IPCC, resigned from those posts. A third remained in post. One of those who left said "I have been alarmed to learn that not only have the IPCC broken their own guidelines by giving out erroneous information to journalists regarding the 'shoot-out' involving Mark Duggan and police that didn't actually happen. But I have discovered that their investigation ... is flawed and in all probability tainted to a degree that means we will never be able to have faith in their final report into the killing."

On 29 February 2012 the IPCC upheld a complaint that the Metropolitan Police had not adequately informed Duggan's family of his death on 4 August 2011. The IPCC's inquiry expressly did not address the events of 6 August 2011 and afterwards. Deputy Assistant Commissioner Steve Kavanagh of the Metropolitan Police had already issued an apology (in August 2011) to the Duggan family for the manner in which police initially communicated with them, suggesting that the IPCC had a responsibility to provide information to Duggan's family.

In late March 2012 the IPCC indicated that the Regulation of Investigatory Powers Act 2000 made it impossible for the organisation to reveal information obtained during its investigation into Duggan's death, making it doubtful if a public coroner's inquest into the killing could ever be held.

In April 2012, the BBC aired footage of the immediate aftermath of the shooting. The footage showed paramedics handling Duggan's body. The IPCC condemned the BBC for showing the footage without first consulting them.

The IPCC was expected to release its report on the killing in summer of 2012. Because no report had been issued by January 2013, a planned inquest into the killing was delayed until September. The IPCC announced in March 2013 that it would issue a report in April, for delivery to the inquest in May. Referring to the officers who killed Duggan, an IPCC spokesperson announced on 2 August 2013 that "We have found no evidence to indicate criminality at this stage." The IPCC said its investigation had substantially ended and that a final report would be issued later in August.

The 11 officers involved initially refused interviews with the IPCC. The officer who killed Duggan, now known as "V53", later submitted testimony in writing.

In December 2019, Forensic Architecture called for the 2011 case to be reopened, claiming that a virtual model of the shooting casts doubt on its findings. Their report was released to the public in June 2020. The IOPC (the successor to the IPCC) said in May 2021 that it would not reopen the investigation because there was nothing in the new reports to suggest that the findings of the IPCC investigation were incorrect.

=== Metropolitan Police ===
Police stated that "no officer had done wrong" but announced that the person who shot Duggan would not remain on active firearms duty.

The firearms officer involved in the operation known only as V53 provided written statements to the IPCC but refused to be interviewed. David Lammy, the MP for Tottenham, was critical of his refusal. The IPCC asked for the power to interview police officers even if they are not suspected of having committed a crime.

=== Trial of Kevin Hutchinson-Foster ===
In November 2011, the IPCC began an investigation into the "quality of the investigative response" by police to an incident on 29 July 2011, for which police charged Kevin Hutchinson-Foster with possession of a handgun, believing the gun may be the same found at the shooting of Duggan.

On 18 September 2012, Hutchinson-Foster's trial commenced in the Crown Court at Snaresbrook. The defendant was charged with supplying Duggan with the BBM Bruni Model 92 handgun, found near Duggan's car after his death. The defendant denied the charge and gave his explanation for the presence of his DNA on the gun by alleging he had been beaten with the weapon by a gang that included Duggan.

During the trial, prosecutor Edward Brown QC of QEB Hollis Whiteman contended that Duggan travelled to Leyton to collect the gun from Hutchinson-Foster, before driving to Tottenham with it. The police alleged that Duggan had received a gun from Hutchinson-Foster 12–15 minutes before he was shot.

==== Police testimony ====
The trial included testimony from seven police officers who were allowed to remain anonymous and use pseudonyms. The Police alleged that Duggan had pulled the gun from his waistband and pointed it at police before they shot him.

According to the evidence given by the cab driver and corroborated by one policeman present at the scene, Duggan got out of the taxi and ran in an attempt to escape. The driver stated, "I saw that Mark Duggan got out and ran. At the same time, I heard firing from the front. I saw shots strike Mark Duggan. He fell to the ground." "Mark Duggan only got 2ft–3ft from my car when he was shot", the taxi driver later testified.

==== Pathologist testimony ====
Simon Poole, a pathologist who had performed a post-mortem on Duggan's body, testified in January 2013 at the retrial of Kevin Hutchinson-Foster and asserted that the injuries Duggan sustained in the shooting were not consistent with the account of the incident that was given by the police officer who fired the lethal shot. Questioned by a barrister representing Hutchinson-Foster, Poole said that the police bullet had penetrated Duggan's body on the right side and travelled from right to left. Poole agreed with the barrister's statement: "So the scenario can't be right? The officer fires to his left and the bullet hits Mr Duggan in the chest and it should go from left to right – but it went right to left. Therefore the scenario can't be right?"

Poole also later agreed with the prosecution that if Duggan had turned to face the officer who shot him, his position relative to them would have changed.

A December 2011 IPCC statement had cited Poole for discovering that a second bullet struck Duggan's arm.

==== Outcome ====
On 17 October 2012, the jury failed to reach a verdict. The re-trial date was set for January 2013, and on 31 January 2013 the defendant was convicted of supplying Duggan with the handgun. On 26 February 2013, the defendant was sentenced to eleven years in prison; seven years for supplying the gun, four years for related offences. The Hutchinson-Foster verdict did not resolve a number of central questions related to Duggan's killing, which remained open until the inquest later in 2013.

== Reaction to official response ==
Following interviews in the Tottenham area, some residents have revealed that they do not trust police or investigators, and say that Duggan was executed by police. A report due in summer of 2012 was announced delayed in October 2012. Duggan's family and members of his community suggested that they did not consider the IPCC impartial and did not believe that its investigation was succeeding.

Frustration with the official investigation mounted in May 2012 when it was announced that the 31 police witnesses would not be required to answer questions – instead submitting written testimony. David Lammy, MP from Tottenham, stated: "It is unacceptable that the police officers have not made themselves available for interview, and it is unacceptable that the IPCC does not have the power to compel them to do so."

=== Duggan's family ===
Duggan's family did not believe that the police have been honest about the shooting, and have pressured the police and IPCC for greater transparency. Duggan's sister, Paulette Hall, has stated: "We want justice. We want them to come clean and tell us what happened. The police are human like us. If you kill someone, you should do the time, just like we would have to do." Hall has reiterated concerns about media portrayals, and produced her own film titled The Real Story of Mark Duggan.

Duggan's mother, Pamela, has said: "We still don't have justice. I won't give up until I get justice for Mark. People need to be held to account for my son's death. There needs to be a full inquest, in front of a jury of ordinary men and women, to find out the truth." She sought judicial review of the case, requesting oversight of the Association of Chief Police Officers (ACPO) and the IPCC. London's High Court of Justice rejected her application for judicial review on 18 June 2013.

The family have criticized the IPCC for delaying the investigation. Expecting an inquest to begin on 28 January and instead facing indefinite postponement, a barrister for the Duggan family commented: "It is absolutely shocking to find ourselves here today and to hear your counsel saying that there are further investigations, basic investigations, to be conducted such as a reconstruction and forensics."

=== Stafford Scott ===
Stafford Scott, originally appointed as an advisor to Operation Trident, resigned from the investigation because he felt that it was not being conducted fairly. Writing in The Guardian, he stated:

The IPCC has broken its own guidelines by giving out erroneous information to journalists regarding the "shoot-out" involving Duggan and police that didn't actually happen. And its investigation is flawed and in all probability tainted – so much so that we can never have faith in its final report.

Scott blames the police response to the Duggan shooting for the escalation of the 2011 riots. He later criticized authorities for treating the Hutchinson-Foster as a proxy for the Duggan investigation, while continuing to delay the official inquest on Duggan's death. He says that members of Duggan's community feel ignored and lied to by authorities, writing in March 2012: "In August 2011 the word on the streets was that 'they executed Mark'. Seven months later the word is that the police had control of the gun or worse."

After the Hutchinson-Foster trial, Scott criticized the Trident police for inaction, writing: "So it is now clear that the police had a golden opportunity to remove an identified gunman and a firearm off of the streets but somehow managed not to do so. And this is all the more shocking because the police have a special unit, Trident, established specifically to deal with gun crime in the black community."

== Inquest ==
=== Preparations ===
At a pre-inquest hearing in June 2012, coroner Andrew Walker said it was "quite extraordinary" that the IPCC refused to provide witness statements. He ordered the material to be disclosed within 28 days. Representing the Duggan family, Michael Mansfield QC said the IPCC's position was "utterly unacceptable", and warned them they would be in contempt if they refused the coroner's order.

A public inquest on the killing had been scheduled for 28 January 2013. On 25 January, the inquest was declared indefinitely postponed because the IPCC had not yet released its report. Judge Keith Cutler later announced that the inquest would begin on 16 September 2013. The inquest was expected to last for six to eight weeks.

The government created a website for publicizing materials related to the inquest, and considered live broadcast for some of the proceedings. Testimony from firearms officers was to remain entirely anonymous. Members of the inquest jury may also be kept anonymous.

=== Hearings ===
Inquest hearings began on 16 September 2013. The jury began with a visit to the street in Tottenham where Duggan was killed in 2011.

=== Police allegations ===
Police maintained that Duggan was a gang member linked to violent crime. "As well as gun crime, he was involved in supply of class A drugs and possession of ammunition", said Detective Inspector Mick Foote.

Foote denied making the claim that Duggan had fired at police, saying he was "surprised" that early reports of the incident described a "shoot out". The IPCC later conceded it had misled journalists shortly after the shooting by saying that shots were exchanged.

A police officer appearing in support of the IPCC, wrote in a statement that during informal briefings at the scene of death "officers had apparently thrown a firearm found in his [Duggan's] possession over a fence so that it was out of reach and it would no longer pose a threat to them". No other officer confirmed this.

=== Manner of death ===
The jury learned that Duggan had been killed by a 9mm parabellum, hollow-point bullet, travelling at 870 mph. This type of bullet is designed to cause instant incapacitation.

Pathologist Derrick Pounder said that police had "simply got it wrong" in their accounts of the shooting. Pounder testified that Duggan was hit first by a non-fatal shot to the arm, then killed by a second shot to his chest.

=== The gun ===
Lawyers for the Duggan family argued that police had planted the handgun found on the scene. Two witnesses testified that they saw a police officer move something from the minicab to the place where the gun was found, 20 feet away from Duggan's body. One witness ("Miss J") said she saw the officer pick up the gun, adding: "It will never leave me for the simple reason it's not often you see a gun in broad daylight." She said the officer "had an expression like he'd found gold." Miss J was standing 50 metres away from the scene (with a fence in between), and the final IPCC report noted that there were, "many discrepancies between her accounts, which overall lessens the weight that can be attached to her observations, as they render her evidence unreliable and contradictory."

The driver of the minicab testified that he did not see a gun in Duggan's hand, nor did he see one fly through the air. He said Duggan was shot in the back. Another witness said there was "definitely" a phone in Duggan's hand. During the inquest Ian Stern, counsel for the police, suggested that the same witness – the only one to actually see Duggan being shot – had earlier told a journalist that he (Duggan) had been holding a handgun. The witness denied ever making such statements.

"V53", the officer who shot and killed Duggan, testified that Duggan was still holding a gun after both of the shots were fired, saying his eyes were "glued to the gun." Military surgeon Jonathan Clasper testified that it would be difficult to imagine Duggan throwing his gun 20 feet after being hit by the two shots.

Near the end of the hearings, lawyer Leslie Thomas confronted the police officer "V59" with the possibility that a gun had been planted, saying: "I'm going to suggest to you, V59, that you knew where the gun was before the officers had gone round (the fence), because you, and all of your colleagues had planted it there." The officer replied: "I did not plant any gun at any scene. I find that highly offensive." Thomas also accused officer "W70" of inconsistencies and omissions in testimony.

=== Protests ===
During the inquest, student protesters were heard chanting: "Who killed Mark Duggan? You killed Mark Duggan." On 11 December, students protested outside the Royal Courts of Justice while the inquest was underway.

=== Deliberation and verdict ===
The jury began deliberations on 10 December 2013, asked to render a verdict of unlawful killing, lawful killing, or open verdict. Subsequently, Cutler told the jury that he would accept a conclusion based on a majority agreement by 8 of the 10 jurors.

The jury interrupted deliberations over Christmas and resumed on 7 January 2014. They delivered their conclusions at approximately 16:00 on 8 January, concluding (by an 8–2 majority) that Duggan's death was a lawful killing.

=== Legal challenge and appeal ===
Following the inquest, a case was brought by Duggan's mother to the High Court seeking judicial review, arguing that the coroner's directions to the jury were legally incorrect. The direction to the jury instructed them to determine whether or not the officer who shot Duggan was acting on an honest belief that Duggan was a threat, not whether his belief was reasonable. The case challenged the legal standard for self-defence as being incompatible with Article 2 of the European Convention on Human Rights which protects the right to life.

In October 2014, the High Court rejected this challenge. Leave was given to appeal the case to the civil division of the Court of Appeal of England and Wales, but the appellate court also rejected the claims in 2017.

In March 2019, Duggan's family brought a civil claim against the Metropolitan Police. The claim was settled in October 2019. The terms of the settlement were confidential. The Metropolitan Police did not admit liability for Duggan's death.

== See also ==
- Race and crime in the United Kingdom
- List of people killed by law enforcement officers in the United Kingdom
- Police use of firearms in the United Kingdom
- List of cases of police brutality in the United Kingdom
- Death of Anthony Grainger
- Deaths after contact with the police
- The Hard Stop
