= Mark Ellison =

British barrister

Mark Ellison KC

First Senior Treasury Counsel
- In office January 2006 – September 2008
- Monarch: Elizabeth II

Personal details
- Born: Mark Christopher Ellison London, GB
- Occupation: Barrister
- Website: QEB Hollis Whiteman

Mark Ellison KC is a British barrister and member of QEB Hollis Whiteman chambers.

== Career ==
Having gained his LLB at the University of Wales, he was called to the bar at Gray's Inn in 1979. Specialising in fraud, he acted for both defence and prosecution in a number of high-profile serious fraud cases, including the Guinness share-trading fraud and Blue Arrow; and corruption involving North Sea oil and Channel Tunnel contracts.

In 1994 he was invited to become an HM Treasury counsel, and was appointed First Senior Treasury Counsel from 2006 to 2008. During this time he advised and acted in: complex serious fraud; corruption in public and private bodies; third party disclosure; trial secrecy; press freedom issue; admissibility and gathering of foreign evidence, including intercept and official secrets act; advice on prosecuting members of political parties for donation offences; advice on criminal law issues connected to the alleged illegality of the Iraq War. He has also worked for clients with regards professional practise and disciplinary issues in front of the General Medical Council.

== Notable cases ==
=== Stephen Lawrence ===
In 2012, Ellison successfully led and secured the first convictions of any of Stephen Lawrence's murderers, through the convictions for murder of Gary Dobson and David Norris. Despite inquiries by both Scotland Yard and the Independent Police Complaints Commission ruling that there was no new evidence to warrant further investigation, after discussions with Doreen Lawrence, Home Secretary Theresa May commissioned Ellison to review Scotland Yard's investigations into alleged police corruption.

The report, was presented to Parliament by May on 6 March 2014. Sir Bernard Hogan-Howe, Commissioner of the Metropolitan Police said the report, which has prompted an inquiry into undercover policing, was "devastating". Ellison's report also showed that there was substantial evidence linking an alleged corrupt police officer with involvement in the murder of private investigator Daniel Morgan.

== Notable appointments ==
Ellison was appointed Queen's Counsel in 2008. Ellison is a past chairman of Bar Council's remuneration and terms of work committee, and a Bar Council member of the Criminal Justice Council.
