= 1997 Northern Ireland riots =

Irish nationalist mass protests

- Part of the Troubles and Drumcree conflict
- Drumcree, The Garvaghy Road July 1997 by military artist David Rowlands, oil paint on canvas, 91cm x 61 cm, painting owned by the 1st Battalion (The Cheshires) The Mercian Regiment which depicts British soldiers during the rioting on Garvaghy Road
Date	6–11 July 1997
Location	Irish nationalist districts of Northern Ireland
Result	Several Orange Order parades re-routed or cancelled

Belligerents
Irish nationalist rioters Supported by: Provisional IRA; INLA; Continuity IRA	United Kingdom: British Army; Royal Ulster Constabulary

Commanders and leaders
Kevin McKenna (IRA)	Ronnie Flanagan (RUC); Rupert Smith (BA)

Casualties and losses
1 civilian killed over 100 people injured, 117 arrested	62 constables injured, at least 3 soldiers injured, some armoured vehicles badly damaged or destroyed
- One loyalist UDA/UFF militant was killed by the explosion of a pipe bomb he was handling in an indirectly related incident

From 6 to 11 July 1997, there were mass protests, fierce riots, and gun battles in Irish nationalist districts of Northern Ireland. Irish nationalists/republicans, in some cases supported by the Provisional Irish Republican Army (IRA), attacked the Royal Ulster Constabulary (RUC) and British Army. The protests and violence were sparked by the decision to allow the Orange Order to march their traditional route, passing through a Catholic/nationalist neighbourhood of Portadown. Irish nationalists were outraged by the decision and by the RUC's aggressive treatment of those protesting against the march. There had been a bitter dispute over the march for many years.

It was the last spell of widespread violence in Northern Ireland before the signing of the Good Friday Agreement in April 1998. RUC and British Army patrols were attacked hundreds of times by rioters throwing stones and petrol bombs, and by IRA members with automatic rifles and hand grenades. They fired more than 2,500 plastic bullets at rioters and exchanged gunfire with the IRA. More than 100 civilians and 65 security force personnel were injured. There were many complaints of police brutality and a 13-year-old boy went into a coma after being struck on the head by a plastic bullet. Hundreds of vehicles were hijacked, set on fire and used to block roads in Belfast and other districts like Newry, Armagh and Dungannon. The RUC and the British troops had to withdraw entirely from some nationalist areas of Belfast. The Provisional IRA's involvement in the clashes was its last major action during its 27-year campaign. The paramilitary organisation declared its last ceasefire on 19 July.

== Background ==
The Orange Order is a Protestant, unionist fraternal organisation. It insists that it should be allowed to march its traditional route to-and-from Drumcree Church each July. It had marched this route since 1807, when the area was mostly farmland. However, today most of this route is through the mainly Catholic/Irish nationalist part of Portadown. The residents sought to re-route the march away from their area, seeing it as "triumphalist" and "supremacist". They likened it to a Ku Klux Klan march through an African American neighbourhood.

The march was first banned in 1832, although the law was ignored by the Orangemen. Local magistrate William Hancock wrote in 1835: "For some time past the peaceable inhabitants of the parish of Drumcree have been insulted and outraged by large bodies of Orangemen parading the highways, playing party tunes, firing shots, and using the most opprobrious epithets they could invent... a body of Orangemen marched through the town and proceeded to Drumcree church, passing by the Catholic chapel though it was a considerable distance out of their way." The onset of the Troubles in 1969 led to the dispute intensifying and triggered a shift in the local population that further strengthened the ethnic divide. In 1987, the Orangemen were banned from marching along Obins Street, after their march caused severe rioting two years in a row. However, the Orangemen were still allowed to march along the other main road in the Catholic area, the Garvaghy Road.

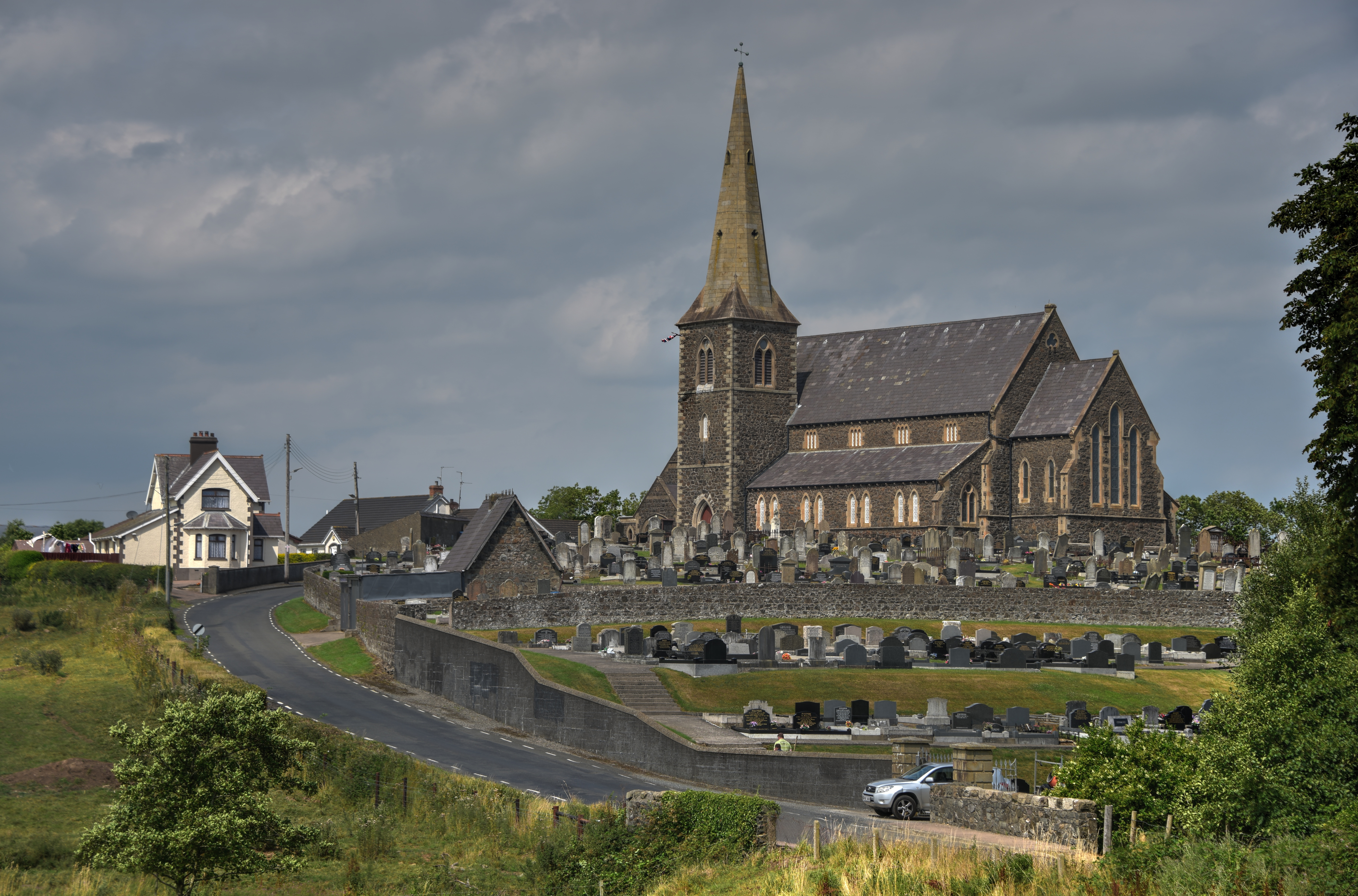
Drumcree Church near Portadown

In 1995, residents formed the Garvaghy Road Residents Coalition (GRRC) to try and divert the march away from Garvaghy Road. The dispute escalated that July when residents blocked Garvaghy Road for two days. Orangemen and their supporters clashed with the Royal Ulster Constabulary (RUC) until the residents were persuaded to clear the road and the march went ahead.

The July 1996 march was banned from Garvaghy Road. Thousands of Orangemen and their supporters gathered at Drumcree and there was a three-day standoff with the RUC. They held large protests and attacked the police and Catholics throughout Northern Ireland. The Loyalist Volunteer Force (LVF) shot dead a Catholic taxi driver and threatened further attacks. As a result, the ban was lifted. Police violently removed nationalist protesters from Garvaghy Road and forced the march through. This sparked days of rioting in Catholic/nationalist areas of Northern Ireland; one protester was crushed to death by a British Army armoured vehicle in Derry (see 1996 Derry riots).

=== July 1997 Drumcree parade ===
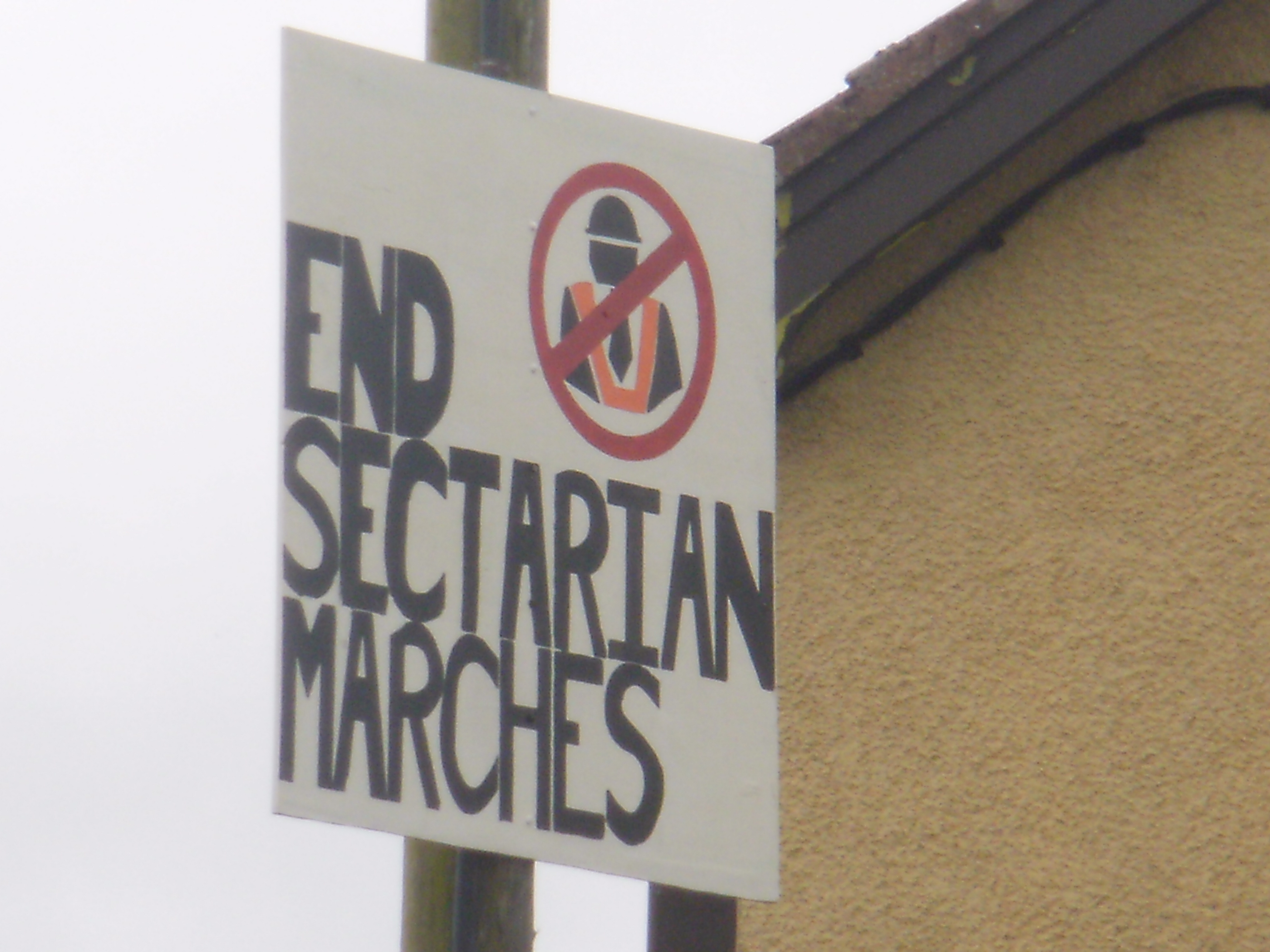
A placard against Orange marches in Catholic/nationalist areas

On 18 June 1997, Alistair Graham warned after the killing of two RUC officers in nearby Lurgan that the IRA was seeking to raise tensions before the march so that a compromise would be impossible.

In June 1997, Secretary of State Mo Mowlam had privately decided to let the march proceed. However, in the days leading up to the march, she insisted that no decision had been made. She met Taoiseach Bertie Ahern, who stressed that any unilateral decision to allow the march would be 'a mistake'. The RUC and the Northern Ireland Office said they would announce their decision two or three days before the march. According to a document leaked from the Public Records Office of Northern Ireland in 2021, on 9 June the RUC requested heavy equipment to government agencies in order to remove roadblocks and barricades set up by potential rioters. It was also revealed that the British Army was measuring Garvaghy Road for the possible deployment of bollards.

As the parade day approached, thousands more British troops were flown into Northern Ireland, while thousands of people left the province fearing another outbreak of violence. Garvaghy Road residents set up a peace camp along the road. The Loyalist Volunteer Force (LVF) threatened to kill Catholic civilians if the march was not allowed to proceed and the Ulster Unionist Party also threatened to withdraw from the Northern Ireland peace process negotiations. On 4 July, sixty families had to be evacuated from their homes on Garvaghy Road after a loyalist bomb threat.

On Sunday 6 July at 3:30am, 1,500 soldiers and riot police swept into the nationalist area in 100 armoured vehicles. They took control of Garvaghy Road so it would be free for the marchers. This led to clashes with about 300 protesters, who began a sit-down protest on the road. They were forcibly removed by riot police. Rosemary Nelson, the lawyer for the residents coalition, was verbally and physically abused by officers. Some officers claimed that residents taunted them about the killing of their two colleagues in Lurgan while shouting IRA slogans. From this point onward, the road was sealed off by rows of armoured vehicles and residents were hemmed into their housing estates. As residents were unable to reach the Catholic church, the local priests held an open-air mass in front of a line of soldiers and armoured personnel carriers. Ronnie Flanagan, the Chief Constable, said the march had been allowed to go ahead to avoid loyalist violence. The parade marched along Garvaghy Road at noon that day. After it passed, the security forces began withdrawing from the area and severe rioting erupted. They were attacked by hundreds of nationalists with stones, bricks and petrol bombs. About 40 plastic bullets were fired at rioters, and about 18 people had to be hospitalised.

== Violent reaction in nationalist areas ==
=== Sunday 6 July ===
Violence erupted across Northern Ireland that evening as news from Portadown reached nationalist areas. Unionist politicians accused the IRA of starting the riots. Irish republican sources admitted that the IRA was openly involved in the unrest, unlike in 1996, when it had restrained itself from retaliation. The IRA claimed a number of actions in response to the Drumcree crisis. During the weekend alone, the IRA carried out at least nine attacks on British troops.

==== Belfast ====
In South Belfast, a lone IRA member with an AKM opened-fire on an RUC checkpoint at Lower Ormeau Road. Five rounds hit an APC parked on the Ormeau Bridge. The attack was filmed by a BBC television crew. Nearby, an IRA unit prevented a British Army riot squad from entering the Markets area after firing 20 machine gun rounds at them.

In North Belfast, several British Army patrols were harassed by gunfire and a bomb was thrown at an RUC base. An armoured vehicle was set on fire in Ardoyne, according to republican sources. Another one was burnt-out on Antrim Road. Late that evening in the Oldpark area, an RUC Land Rover became stuck in a barricade made of iron pilings and its crew had to flee when it was attacked with petrol bombs. The Continuity IRA (CIRA) claimed responsibility for a gun attack on RUC officers in the Oldpark Road-Cliftonville area, which according to the statement left one constable wounded.

In the Lenadoon area of West Belfast, the RUC shot a 14-year-old boy and 13-year-old girl with plastic bullets. The boy was struck in the head and spent three days in a coma, while the girl was struck in the face, knocking out her teeth. The RUC said there was rioting in the area at the time, but republicans denied this, claiming the RUC had arrived in Land Rovers and "opened fire on groups of young people returning home from a disco". The CIRA claimed responsibility for a gun and grenade attack on New Barnsley RUC station, and shots fired on the Stewartstown Road, Andersonstwown.

There was violence at the interface on Lanark Way, which separates the loyalist Shankill and republican Falls districts. Stones, bricks and bottles were hurled across the security fence. An Phoblacht reported that warning shots were fired from the nationalist side.

In East Belfast, the IRA claimed to have fired small arms at an armoured patrol on the Newtownards Road while petrol bombers forced the RUC to close an access road to the M3 motorway.

Another 24 people were admitted to Belfast's City Hospital and Royal Victoria Hospital.

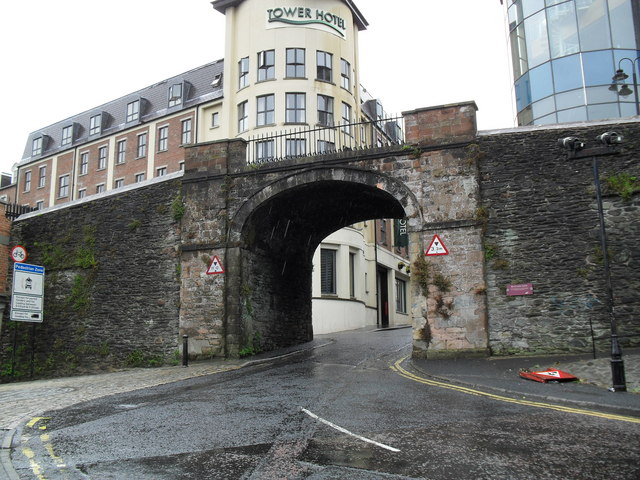
Butcher Gate, scene of the violence in Derry

==== Derry ====
On Sunday evening in Derry, thousands of people joined a protest march from the Bogside to the RUC base at Strand Road. Martin McGuinness addressed the crowd, calling on nationalists elsewhere to take to the streets to demand "justice and equality" and to "stand up for their rights". Although the protesters returned to the Bogside peacefully, there was violence in the city centre.

At Butcher Gate, there were running clashes between the RUC and at least 300 nationalist youths. Cars were hijacked and burnt and one was set ablaze after being driven through the gates of a bank, while petrol bombs were thrown at the Protestant Apprentice Boys fraternity headquarters by the rioters. It is claimed that the RUC fired "upwards of 1,000 plastic bullets", many of them fired "indiscriminately" and aimed "above the waist, in direct contravention of the rules governing the use of such lethal weapons". A 16-year-old boy suffered "a fractured skull, a broken jaw, and shattered facial bones amongst other injuries" after allegedly being beaten by RUC officers. He was on life support for some time afterwards. An eyewitness described seeing one man, allegedly an onlooker, being shot in the face: "The side of his face was completely torn away, and he seemed to just slump to the ground". Several others suffered serious head injuries. Nine were admitted to Altnagelvin Hospital with plastic bullet injuries. At least 30 others sought treatment at first aid houses or at Letterkenny Hospital across the border. Most of downtown Derry was sealed off by the RUC and British Army.

==== Newry ====
In Newry, 3,000 joined a protest march to the Ardmore RUC base, where a rally was held. People marched behind banners saying "Disband the RUC" and "Dismantle the Orange State". Later, masked and armed men set a Social Security office on fire.

==== County Tyrone ====
In Coalisland, the IRA's East Tyrone Brigade launched a gun attack on an RUC armoured vehicle outside the RUC base; a female officer from Portadown was badly wounded. Some sources fixed the date of the attack as 5 July. An Orange Order hall was set on fire in Dungannon, where violence erupted, and another in Moy, while nationalist residents forced their way through RUC lines to stop an Orange march in Pomeroy. In West Tyrone, Strabane witnesses the burning of 13 vehicles by republican sympathizers. About 250 petrol bombs were thrown at RUC squads, who fired plastic bullets in return.

==== County Armagh ====
In Armagh, hundreds attended a protest rally at The Shambles. Later, the RUC and British Army set up roadblocks on entrances to the town centre, and nationalist youths hijacked a number of vehicles. There were clashes between nationalists and the RUC on English Street; two youths were injured by plastic bullets. Just before midnight, there was a shootout between two IRA members and the RUC at a security roadblock. The same roadblock was later petrol-bombed as violence continued into the night.

In Lurgan, nine masked IRA members boarded a train, forced the passengers out and set it on fire, destroying five carriages.

=== Monday 7 July ===
By 7 July, there were over 100 people injured, six of them in seriously. The RUC said there had been 1,600 plastic bullets fired, 550 attacks on the security forces, and 41 people arrested. The fire service had received 500 calls and the ambulance service 150, while the damage to property was estimated at £20 million. Some districts in Belfast and elsewhere were regarded as 'no go' areas by the RUC, with roads across the region "blocked by burning cars, buses and other vehicles".

==== Belfast ====
Shortly after midnight, a 25-year-old woman suffered a fractured bone after being shot in the leg by a live round fired from New Barnsley RUC base. The base was the target of a gun and grenade attack. At the Larnak Way interface in West Belfast, loyalists tried to enter the nationalist area at 3 am. A shot fired from the nationalist side struck a 14-year-old Protestant boy who was climbing over the security fence. It hit him in the shoulder and punctured a lung. One source reported that warning shots had been fired, while another said the teenager was wounded when an IRA unit launched a gun and grenade attack on a military base near the interface. There was an IRA rocket attack on an RUC patrol on Hallydays Road, in the New Lodge, while another RUC mobile patrol driving through Crumlin Road was forced to withdraw from the Ardoyne area when it was hit by 20 rounds fired from an IRA unit. The RUC returned fire. Irish National Liberation Army (INLA) gunmen also opened fire on British soldiers in West Belfast, where rioters blocked Whiterock Road with a digger. The CIRA claimed responsibility for a booby-trap bomb targeting British security forces left in Edenderry on the outskirts of Belfast.

In the Dunmurry area of Belfast, Brian Morton, a militant of the Ulster Defence Association (UDA) was killed when the pipe bomb he was handling exploded prematurely. RUC sources described Morton as a "dedicated" member of the UDA and allegedly the second-in-command in the UFF South Belfast Brigade. The incident happened at an arms dump in a remote area. Later that night, members of the UDA and Ulster Volunteer Force (UVF) held a joint "show of strength" in North Belfast. Masked men armed with assault rifles and machine guns were filmed patrolling in Woodvale, saying they were there to protect Protestants. Members of the Loyalist Volunteer Force (LVF) held a similar "show of strength" on Tuesday night.

A 39-year-old American citizen, John Hemsworth, was beaten with a baton by RUC officers on his way home in the nationalist Falls area. He was stopped in Malcomson Street, where he was assaulted and verbally abused by the officers. There were no riots or protests in the area at the time. Hemsworth suffered a broken jaw and other injuries, and was admitted to hospital. He was discharged, but on 27 December he was re-admitted and died from a massive stroke on 1 January 1998. An inquest later found that he had died as result of the injuries received during the RUC beating.

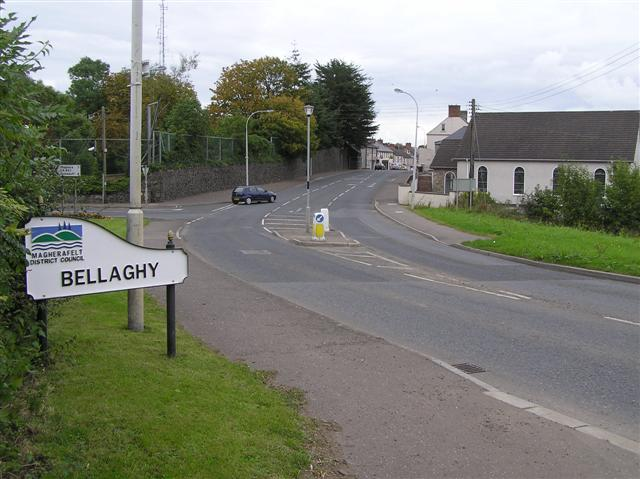
There were clashes during an Orange march in the village of Bellaghy, County Londonderry

==== Bellaghy ====
In the mainly nationalist village of Bellaghy, County Londonderry, residents mounted a peaceful protest against the yearly Orange march. There were scuffles as the RUC and British Army moved the protesters away from the parade route. Martin McGuinness was struck on the head with a baton while giving an interview nearby.

==== Elsewhere ====
Several roadblocks were set up by masked and armed men in Newry. The city was declared "impassable" by the Automobile Association. In Armagh city, where several streets were also blocked, the RUC was forced to bar traffic from downtown for the risk of hijacking. A shopping centre in downtown Newry was looted by what republican sources called "a gang responsible for a long series of anti-social activities and intimidation". The IRA reportedly injured two of the gang members in a punishment shooting on 13 July.

There was severe rioting in Downpatrick; masked gunmen were spotted and RUC officers fired into the air during the disturbances. They arrested a man and seized a gun and masks.

The house of a former Protestant councillor who incidentally had died in hospital from an unrelated illness barely minutes before was the target of a petrol bomb attack in Derry.

An Orange Order hall was set on fire at Newtownhamilton in South Armagh, after suffering three attacks in 24 hours. Four other halls suffered the same fate in Cookstown, Beragh, Sixmilecross and Ballycastle.

=== Tuesday 8 July ===
On 8 July, a document was leaked to the press which hinted that Mo Mowlan had decided in June to allow the Drumcree march to proceed. This caused further outrage among nationalists. That day, residents announced that they would block the Orange Order's 12 July parades in Armagh, Newry, Bellaghy, Lower Ormeau Road (Belfast), Derry and Strabane.

An RUC source confirmed that the IRA had carried out more than a dozen gun and grenade attacks since 6 July, while 250 vehicles had been burnt. The INLA claimed responsibility for several gun and grenade attacks in the preceding days and threatened to attack Orangemen and other loyalist groups if a contentious Orange Order march planned for the Lower Ormeau was forced through on July 12. Earlier RUC intelligence reports warned that an INLA cell based in the Markets area planned to open fire on the parade as it passed along the Lower Ormeau.

==== Belfast ====
The IRA's Belfast Brigade claimed that dozens of its members were involved in operations against the security forces in West and North Belfast since Sunday.

In the Ardoyne area of North Belfast, an IRA volunteer fired 15 shots at a British soldier who was firing plastic bullets at rioters at the junction of Woodvale and Crumlin Roads. According to a republican report, this action was filmed by an independent television crew. Nearby, republican sources reported another gunfight between the IRA and RUC at Oldpark Road, while an IRA sniper fired a single shot at an RUC constable at Alliance Avenue. Another RUC patrol received 20 shots by an IRA unit at Oldpark. Later that night, the IRA also reported the shooting of two loyalists who were throwing petrol bombs at Catholic homes there.

In West Belfast, 15 shots were fired, and an improvised grenade thrown at Woodbourne Army base. On the Falls Road, 20 rounds were fired at a British security checkpoint. Although there was return fire, all the IRA members made good their escape. According to independent sources, IRA members fired at British soldiers and RUC officers who were trying to remove barricades in North Belfast in the early hours of Tuesday, forcing them to retreat. No injuries were reported. Petrol bombs were thrown at RUC vehicles and a passing 11-year-boy suffered severe burns when he was mistakenly hit by one of the bombs. The Protestant estate at Suffolk was attacked from Lenadoon. Several cars were burned. Scattered riots continued throughout the day and the outbound lanes of a highway were blocked by hijacked cars.

==== Elsewhere ====
About 100 rioters clashed with the RUC in Bellaghy and the Orange hall was hit by a number of petrol-bombs. Another three Orange halls were burnt in Portadown, Dunloy and Moy.

During disturbances in Portadown on Tuesday morning, an RUC officer was shot in the arm and leg by IRA members near Garvaghy Road. In Newry, British government buildings were set on fire and a train was partially burnt out at the railway station. Also in Newry, on the Dublin Road a van driver was stopped and forced to take two beer kegs to the nearby vehicle checkpoint. The suspect device was dealt with by the British Army.

On Tuesday evening, protesters held a "white line picket" in The Shambles area of Armagh. A crowd of several hundred surged up English Street and were blocked by a line of RUC Land Rovers. The picket lasted an hour and was concluded after Sinn Féin councillor Noel Sheridan addressed the crowd, urging them to attend further protests during the week.

Shots were fired at the RUC in Carlton Drive, Strabane, County Tyrone. There were no injuries.

Lurgan RUC station was abandoned after a hoax van bomb was left outside.

=== Wednesday 9 July ===
On 9 July, the British Government sent in 400 soldiers of the Staffordshire Regiment to reinforce the 30,000 troops and RUC members already deployed in Northern Ireland. A landmine was planted by the IRA near Dungannon, and a suspected bomb was found in the city's centre, where several vehicles were burnt, while a rifle was recovered at Short Strand in Belfast. A number of false bomb threats threw traffic into chaos. In Carrickmore, County Tyrone, yet another Orange hall was set on fire. In Lurgan's Kilwilkie estate, RUC and Royal Irish Regiment troops tried to clear residents from their homes after claiming there was a bomb near the railway line. When a man was allegedly assaulted by the troops, about 150 people gathered to confront them. RUC officers threatened to fire plastic bullets at the gathering crowd before the bulk of the forces agreed to leave the area. Since Tuesday, the RUC recorded 76 people arrested, 900 plastic bullets fired and 265 attacks on the security forces.

In West Belfast, a car bomb exploded outside shops on the Andersonstown Road. The car had been left by three men wearing dark glasses and carrying walkie-talkies. Sinn Féin members helped clear the area and claimed that the RUC took almost an hour to answer a call from a member of the public. Loyalists were believed to be responsible for the blast.

The LVF vowed to shoot people in the Republic if the marches were banned. The later threat was taken "very seriously" by Gardaí commander Pat Byrne, who put on alert all security checkpoints along the border.

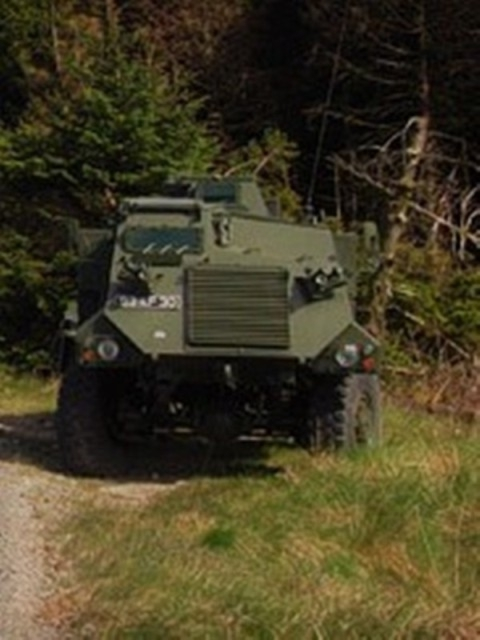
A Saxon armoured vehicle like those used by the British Army during the July 1997 riots

The Orange Order vowed to gather its entire organisation at Ormeau Park if the parade there was banned. Converserly, the Bogside Residents Group called for a huge demonstration to stop 12 July Orange march in Derry.

=== Thursday 10 July ===
In Belfast, the North of Ireland Rugby & Cricket Club and the Carnmoney Church of Ireland were damaged in arson attacks. There was a security alert at Newry RUC station and the Ulster Unionist Party Headquarters received a hoax letter bomb in the post. In Lisnaskea, five commercial buildings owned by Orangemen were attacked and an Orange hall was petrol-bombed in Waterside, Derry.

Violence waned as the Orange Order announced it was reconsidering the route of several parades. A dissident group inside the Order called the decision a "terrible betrayal".

=== Friday 11 July ===
On 11 July, in North Belfast, the IRA launched a gun and bomb attack on a checkpoint guarded by a Saxon armoured vehicle. Three British soldiers and two RUC officers were injured, among them a female constable. The IRA unit dismounted from a car and fired 56 shots from two AK-47 assault rifles and also threw a coffee jar bomb. The soldiers were members of the recently arrived Staffordshire Regiment. In a separate incident on Doon Road, in West Belfast, an RUC/British Army patrol was the target of a grenade attack. The Independent reported that two teenage Protestants at an Eleventh Night bonfire in North Belfast were shot and wounded by republican gunmen who had fired across a peace line. The INLA was blamed, although the group denied responsibility. One of the youths, a 14-year-old schoolboy, underwent emergency surgery. There were also a number of clashes between nationalists and security forces overnight. An Orange hall was burned in Bond Street, Derry.

== Aftermath ==
By 9 July, according to an RUC report, 60 RUC officers and 56 civilians had been injured while 117 people had been arrested. There had been 815 attacks on the security forces, 1,506 petrol bombs thrown and 402 hijackings. The RUC had fired 2,500 plastic bullets. According to other sources, over 100 people are believed to have been injured. The last IRA action took place on 12 July, when an improvised mortar round fell 40 yards (37 m) short of the helipd of RUC/British Army base at Newtownhamilton, South Armagh. Arsonists attacked an Orange hall in Warrenpoint, County Down and another in Rasharkin, County Antrim. Local Sinn Féin councillor Paul Butler and other republican residents claimed to have uncovered a "British Army spy post" in the Summerhill area of Twinbrook, Belfast, allegedly used during the riots to track the neighbours' movements.

The violence died down on 10 July when the Orange Order decided unilaterally to re-route six parades. The following day, Orangemen and residents agreed to waive another march in Newtownbutler, County Fermanagh. In Pomeroy, County Tyrone, nationalist residents blocked Orangemen's return parade with a counter-demonstration, while the marches in Newry and Lower Ormeau were cancelled outright. The Order's gesture was unheard of in its 202-year history. According to Anglican minister Bill Hoey, a member of the Order, "this was an extremely bitter pill to swallow, but the powers that be made it clear to us that to have taken any other decision would have meant civil war." Author Eric Kaufmann claims that the RUC overstated security threats to trick county lodge officials into taking the decision. This was the last time the Order carried on their march through the Garvaghy Road in Portadown, forbidden since 1998 by the Parades Commission.

In a parallel development, on 9 July, the British government assured Sinn Féin that in the event of a new IRA ceasefire, representatives of that party would be allowed to meet with government ministers. A week later, Gerry Adams and Martin McGuinness called for a renewal of the IRA's 1994 ceasefire. The IRA announced the restoration of the ceasefire on 19 July. The Last Gunman, a photograph taken by Brendan Murphy of an IRA man firing an AK-47 on Ormeau Road, became an iconic image of the Troubles.

== See also ==
- 1969 Northern Ireland riots
- 1996 Derry riots
- Drumcree conflict
- Chronology of Provisional Irish Republican Army actions (1990–1999)
- Timeline of Irish National Liberation Army actions
- Timeline of Continuity IRA actions
