= QEB Hollis Whiteman (chambers) =

Barristers' Chambers based in London

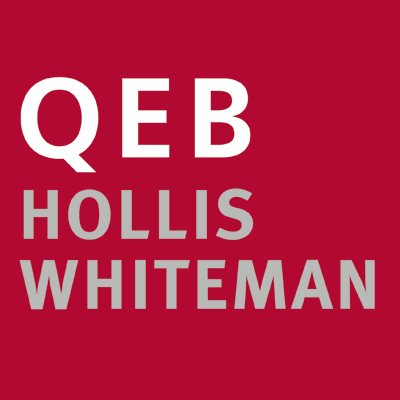
- Headquarters: 1–2 Laurence Pountney Hill, City of London, EC4; United Kingdom
- Offices: London, United Kingdom
- No. of lawyers: 70 practitioners
- Major practice areas: Crime, regulatory.
- Key people: Adrian Darbishire KC and Selva Ramasamy KC (Joint Heads of Chambers)
- Date founded: 1982
- Company type: Unincorporated association of self-employed legal practitioners
- Website: QEBHollisWhiteman.co.uk

QEB Hollis Whiteman is a leading set of barristers' chambers specialising in criminal, financial, and regulatory law, located in the City of London. Established in the 1980s, it employs 70 barristers, including 21 King's Counsel, four Treasury Counsel and one Standing Counsel to the RCPO. The current Heads of Chambers are Adrian Darbishire KC and Selva Ramasamy KC and the Chief Clerk is Chris Emmings.

== History ==
The set was established in June 1982 by Daniel Hollis QC (1925–2016). It was named after their former premises at Queen Elizabeth Building in the Temple which it left in 2010, moving to the City of London.

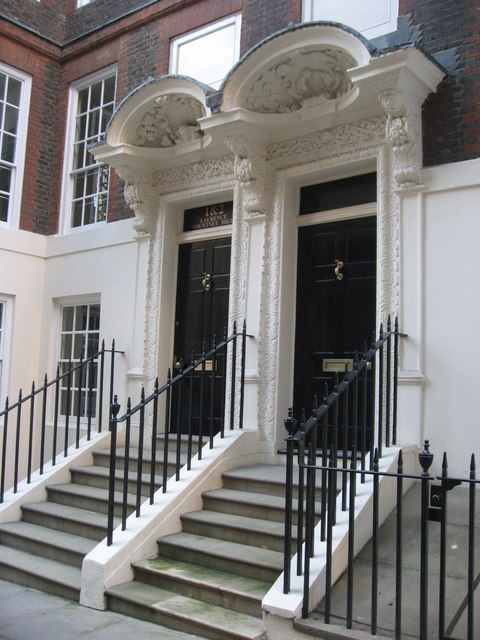
QEB Hollis Whiteman Offices at 1 – 2 Laurence Pountney Hill, City of London, EC4

== Practice areas ==
The set's practice areas include:

- Regulatory
- Corporate crime and Financial crime
- Fraud
- Crime and Private Prosecution
- Public
- Health and Safety
- Confiscation, Restraint and Cash Forfeiture
- Sport, Media and Entertainment

The chambers are considered "the go-to place" for criminal defence as well as for prosecution.

== Notable members ==
Members of chambers have prosecuted and defended in many widely publicised criminal cases.

- Mark Ellison KC defended Hogan Lovells solicitor Chris Grierson when he was accused of £1.27 million expenses fraud, as well as prosecuting on behalf of FCA in £7.4m gains insider dealing case. He also undertook a review of undercover policing in connection to Stephen Lawrence murder for the Home Office.
- Edward Brown KC advised the SFO and leads for the prosecution in the Barclays-Qatar fundraising prosecution, as well as prosecuting Kevin Hutchinson-Foster in connection with Mark Duggan murder.
- Adrian Darbishire KC successfully defended Ryan Reich who was prosecuted by the Serious Fraud Office for manipulating the London LIBOR during the Libor scandal.
- Zoe Johnson KC is a former Senior Treasury Counsel and the founding member of the Bar Disability Panel.
- Peter Kyte KC is a prosecutor who also sits as a recorder at Southwark Crown Court.
- William Boyce KC is a Crown Court Recorder and former Senior Treasury Counsel.
- Eleanor Laws KC is a Recorder and has been described as the "go-to Silk" for sexual offences.
- Tom Kark KC is a Crown Court Recorder and former standing counsel to Customs and Excise. He has been appointed to chair the Muckamore Abbey Hospital Public Inquiry in Northern Ireland (2022). He was a leading Counsel to the Francis Inquiry that examined the causes of the failings in care at Mid Staffordshire NHS Foundation Trust between 2005 and 2009. and conducted a review of the fit and proper person test for the Minister for Health published in 2019. He also sits as a legal assessor in the Osteopathic Council.
- Sean Larkin KC successfully prosecuted alleged Daesh sympathiser in a terrorism case which could have long lasting implications on the definition of terrorism and the impact of public international law on domestic legislation.

=== Notable honorary members ===
Honorary members include Mr Justice David Calvet-Smith, former Director of Public Prosecutions and former chair of the Parole Board for England and Wales.

=== Former notable members ===
Former members include Daniel Hollis QC, the founding member of the set, and judge Ian Paton QC, criminal prosecutor who prosecuted in major criminal trials as well as sitting as a Recorder in Southwark Crown Court.

Heather Norton practised at the chambers for 23 years, until 2012 when she was appointed a Circuit Judge sitting at Canterbury Crown Court.

== Rankings and honours ==
- In 2016, Chambers and Partners named QEB Hollis Whiteman "Crime Set of The Year".
- In 2017, Who's Who Legal listed QEB Hollis Whiteman as one of their “leading sets” for crime.
- In 2018, Legal 500 named QEB Hollis Whiteman as “Crime Set of the Year”.

== See also ==
- Criminal justice
- Criminal defence
