= John Hemsworth =

Irish-American civilian who was fatally beaten by the RUC

- Born: 13 November 1958; Kearney, New Jersey, United States
- Died: 1 January 1998 (aged 39); Belfast, Northern Ireland
- Spouse: Colette Hemsworth
- Children: 3

John Hemsworth (13 November 1958 – 1 January 1998) was an Irish-American plumber who was beaten by constables of the Royal Ulster Constabulary, which caused him to die from a hemorrhagic stroke in January 1998. Hemsworth was the last civilian killed by security forces in the Troubles.

== Personal life ==
John Hemsworth was born on 13 November 1958 in Kearny, New Jersey, and his family moved to Belfast, Northern Ireland, a few years later. He had three daughters, two from a previous relationship and one with his wife, Colette.

== Death ==
On 7 July 1997, Hemsworth was walking home to Conway Street after a night out at the St Gall's GAA club. He would usually have taken a taxi, but none were available because of the 1997 Northern Ireland riots during the Drumcree conflict. At around 1:45 am, while walking along Malcolmson Street, several constables from the RUC Operational Support Unit Blue Section assaulted him with batons and kicked him while he was on the ground. He sustained a broken jaw, an injured neck, and severe bruising.

When he reached home, he told his wife what had happened, and she advised him to seek medical treatment. He was admitted to the Royal Victoria Hospital at 2:21 am. He reported the assault to his solicitors on 10 July.

In November 1997, an at‑home doctor diagnosed Hemsworth with panic disorder after he complained of severe pain. On 27 December, he was admitted to the Belfast City Hospital after falling ill, and he died five days later, on 1 January 1998, from a major haemorrhagic stroke, aged 39.

== Inquiry ==
An inquest was held in September 2009. Colette showed photographs of her husband shortly after the assault, and the hearing was adjourned.

The inquest resumed in 2011, and on 16 May 2011, after reviewing the photographs, it was found that the injuries he sustained from the RUC were one of, if not the main, reasons for his death.
