= Operation Trident (Metropolitan Police) =

Metropolitan Police Service unit targeting gun crime in London

Operation Trident logo

Operation Trident, or simply Trident, is a Metropolitan Police unit originally set up in 1998 as an initiative with the police to tackle "black-on-black" gun crime following a series of shootings in the London boroughs of Lambeth and Brent. By 2008 the unit was responsible for investigating all non-fatal shootings for the Metropolitan Police, and in February 2012 the unit's remit was again expanded: the new Trident Gang Crime Command was launched, incorporating responsibility for tackling wider gang crime. In 2013 the unit gave up responsibility for investigating fatal shootings, which was taken over by the Homicide and Serious Crime Command.

Trident is currently led by Detective Chief Superintendent Dean Haydon, who joined the team from the Counter Terrorism Command in 2012.

The perceived importance of Trident's mission was such that it was established as a dedicated Operational Command Unit, called the Trident Operational Command Unit, within the Metropolitan Police Specialist Crime Directorate - it now falls within the Frontline Policing command.

The campaign uses gun amnesties and advertisements encouraging people to phone Crimestoppers with information related to gun crime. These advertisements appear in the media, nightclubs, on petrol pumps, telephone boxes, and on the radio. Whilst part of Specialist Crime and Operations Directorate, Trident was also known as SC&O8.

As the timeline of the police unit and program has roughly paralleled the development and growth of the rap-styled UK Grime urban music scene, Trident and Grime have had numerous and varied interactions that have mirrored early controversy and conflict around American Gangsta Rap. While some artists like Giggs have spoken out against what they claim is heavy-handed censorship and attempts to sabotage their careers by applying pressure to venue owners, radio stations, and record labels, others like the Roll Deep Crew have worked with Trident to create anti-violence messaging packaged in ways more likely to reach marginalized urban youth. Artist JME, particularly known for his lyrics which are dismissive of content that relies on excessively violent hyperbole, released a short film via VICE Magazine, entitled "The Police vs Grime Music", investigating the details of the phenomenon of police suppression of grime events.

In 2006, Trident officers raided the home of vintage gun enthusiast Mick Shepherd, seizing much of his collection. At the time, press reports claimed a "huge gun-smuggling racket" had been uncovered, and that guns sold by Shepherd were linked to a number of murders. After being held in Pentonville and then the high-security Belmarsh prisons on remand for 10 months awaiting trial, Shepherd was acquitted of all 13 firearms offences with which he was charged.

In 2011, armed police officers killed Mark Duggan while he was under investigation by Trident. Duggan was aware of this, texting "Trident have jammed me" moments before his death, when he was soon shot by armed officers on the evening of 4 August 2011. His killing sparked the 2011 England riots, ultimately leading to 5 dead, over 200 reported injuries, over 3000 arrests. Following the IPCC (now IOPC)'s investigation, an inquest was launched in 2013, ultimately leading to an 8-2 verdict finding a lawful killing. In December 2019, Forensic Architecture released a report contending with the police's version of events, and asked for the investigation to be reopened, but this was ultimately rejected by the IOPC.

== See also ==
- Crime in London
- Yardie
- Specialist Crime Directorate
- Death of Mark Duggan
