= 2007 in British radio =

This is a list of events in British radio during 2007.

== Events ==
=== January ===
- 2 January – Central Tonight sports presenter Sarah-Jane Mee joins 100.7 Heart FM as a breakfast show presenter alongside Ed James. She had briefly presented the show in Summer 2006 while James's then co-host Helen Kennedy was on maternity leave.
- 21 January – Your Hundred Best Tunes is broadcast on BBC Radio 2 for the final time after 47 years on air.
- 28 January – Alan Titchmarsh joins BBC Radio 2 to present Alan Titchmarsh with Melodies for You on Sunday evenings, replacing Your Hundred Best Tunes.
- Undated in January – The Channel 4 Radio brand is launched by Channel 4 as an online service. It lasts until October 2008.

=== February ===
- Undated in February – North Yorkshire station Fresh Radio begins broadcasting on FM in the more populated parts of its broadcast area. Fresh begins broadcasting on FM in Richmond on 11 February 2007 and to the Wharfedale area a week later.
- 17 February – BBC Radio 3 makes major changes to its schedule. These include Rob Cowan replacing Penny Gore as breakfast presenter and an extended weekday afternoon show which will run from 2pm until the start of In Tune at 5pm. The programmes previously broadcast at 4pm will be axed with one of those – Choral Evensong – moving to Sunday afternoons. The changes also see a reduction in the number of live concerts with live broadcasts replaced by pre-recorded concerts.

=== March ===
- 5 March – The Coventry University students union radio station Source Radio launches to Coventry on 1431AM. The station, under the management of Kat Page, celebrates the occasion with a special programme presented live from the Student's Union nightclub, FiftyFour. Source was launched on AM to fill the gap left by youth station Kix 96 after it was rebranded as Touch Radio and adopted an adult contemporary format.
- 21 March – It is confirmed that former Radio 2 presenter Lynn Parsons and ex-Capital host Mike Allen will join 102.2 Smooth Radio which launches on 26 March. The line-up will also include Graham Dene, Mark Goodier, Kevin Greening, Martin Collins and Nick Barraclough. Mark Goodier will present his first daily radio show for more than a decade on the station.
- 26 March – All Smooth Radio and Saga Radio are relaunched as the Smooth Network.
- 29 March – BBC Radio WM presenter Tony Butler apologises to listeners following comments he made on air the previous day about women and the armed forces. Speaking about the Iranian seizure of Royal Navy personnel, which included a female officer, he said women should not be in war zones and, that were she decapitated, "it would serve her right".

=== April ===
- 4 April – Broadcaster Bob Harris announces he will take a break from his Radio 2 shows while he receives treatment for prostate cancer.
- 10 April – Les Ross takes over the weekday afternoon show on BBC Radio WM.
- 16 April – The first Radcliffe and Maconie Show presented by Mark Radcliffe and Stuart Maconie is aired on Radio 2.
- April – Fresh Radio switches off two of its three AM frequencies following the start of broadcasts on FM. The MW transmitter based in Hawes, which covers the sparsely populated areas of the Yorkshire Dales, remains on air.

=== May ===
- 20 May – Time 107.3 is relaunched as South London Radio.

=== June ===
- 25 June – It is announced that the Heart Network along with its sister stations The Arrow, LBC and Galaxy are to be sold for £170 million to Global Radio from Chrysalis Radio.
- 30 June – Journalist Stephanie Flanders presents an edition of BBC Radio 4's Archive Hour about her father's career, titled Flanders on Flanders.

=== July ===
- No events

=== August ===
- 3 August – All stations in the Classic Gold and Capital Gold networks are replaced by a new network called simply Gold, the result of the merger of the Classic Gold and Capital Gold networks under one owner, GCap Media.
- 11 August – BBC Radio Cleveland is rebranded as BBC Tees due to its broadcasting area no longer being associated with the name Cleveland.
- 13 August – Concern is expressed for Radio 2 presenter Sarah Kennedy following her slurred speech throughout the day's edition of her Dawn Patrol programme. Blaming a sore throat, she presents the following day's show as normal, before taking a month-long break, leaving the show to be presented by colleagues Pete Mitchell, Alex Lester, Aled Jones and Richard Allinson. It is later reported that Kennedy was recovering from pneumonia, and she returns to work on 10 September.
- 23 August – GMG Radio confirms that Mark Goodier's mid-morning show on 102.2 Smooth Radio will be syndicated across other Smooth stations in the network from September.
- 31 August – In an interview with BBC Radio 5 Live's Simon Mayo, television writer Jimmy McGovern describes the BBC as "one of the most racist institutions in England" because of the lack of ethnic people in prominent positions. The BBC responds by saying it is "actively seeking and nurturing ethnic talents both on and off the air."
- August
  - Following a complaint from the Royal Household about the misrepresentation of the Queen in a BBC documentary, Mark Thompson, Director-General of the BBC, in a public purging exercise, singles out DJ Liz Kershaw's BBC Radio 6 Music show as one in which some broadcasts aired as live were in fact pre-recorded and that members of the production team had passed themselves off as listeners texting and emailing into competitions.
  - Pirate BBC Essex makes its second broadcast, to mark the 40th anniversary of the closing of the pirate stations by the Marine Broadcasting Offences Act 1967. It once again broadcasts on the MW frequencies of BBC Essex.

=== September ===
- 12 September – CTR 105.6 is rebranded as KMFM Maidstone.
- 17 September – BBC Radio 3's breakfast programme is renamed from Mornings on 3 to Breakfast.
- 25 September – Heat Radio re-launches with presenters and showbiz news throughout the day, having previously been a music only service.
- 30 September – BBC Radio 1 celebrates its 40th birthday.

=== October ===
- 8 October – BRMB is criticised by media watchdog Ofcom for running a competition "in a manner designed to obscure the true nature of the prize" after they had invited listeners to enter a contest to watch the 2007 UEFA Champions League final in Athens in May. The venue had turned out to be a Greek restaurant in Birmingham named Athens rather than the Greek capital, something Ofcom describes as a "serious breach" of its broadcasting regulations.
- 19 October – Michael Parkinson announces he will leave his Sunday morning Radio 2 show, Parkinson's Sunday Supplement after 11 years. He presented his last show in December.
- 28 October – Original 106, the last new commercial FM licence to be issued by Ofcom launched, broadcasting to Aberdeen and north east Scotland.
- 31 October – The BBC issues an apology following comments made by Sarah Kennedy on her Dawn Patrol show the previous week. In a segment about the importance of wearing visible clothing in winter road conditions, she joked that she had almost run over a black pedestrian because she couldn't see him in the dark.

=== November ===
- No events

=== December ===
- 1 December – Having returned to Bob Harris Country in November, Bob Harris returns to his Saturday evening show.
- 3 December – BBC Somerset Sound is rebranded as BBC Somerset and becomes available on FM for the first time.
- 17 December – Several Welsh radio stations owned by Town and Country Broadcasting say they will boycott The 2007 X Factor winner Leon Jackson's debut single, When You Believe amid suggestions that phone line issues resulted in Jackson's rival, Welshman Rhydian Roberts losing out to him in the final. The stations concerned are Bridge FM, Swansea Bay Radio, Radio Carmarthenshire, Radio Pembrokeshire and Scarlet FM.
- 18 December – BBC Radio 1 is forced to backtrack on a decision to begin playing a censored version of The Pogues' 1987 Christmas hit Fairytale of New York. The song which sees Kirsty MacColl and Shane MacGowan trading insults has the words "faggot" and "slut" edited out to "avoid offence", but after a day of criticism from listeners, the band, and MacColl's mother, the decision is reversed and the original version played in full.
- 21 December – Simon Mayo presents The Radio 2 Music Club Introduces Adele, a programme featuring recently recorded material from Adele, who releases her debut album in January 2008.
- 23 December – The A List ends after less than two years. The chart, which had focussed on adult contemporary music, had been aired on Heart, Real Radio and Century FM.

== Station debuts ==
- February – Harborough FM
- 5 March – Source Radio (Coventry-wide on AM)
- 26 March –
  - 100.4 Smooth Radio operates in North West England.
  - 102.2 Smooth Radio operates in London
  - 105.2 Smooth Radio – Glasgow
  - 106.6 Smooth Radio – East Midlands
  - 105.7 Smooth Radio airs in the West Midlands
- 16 April – Life FM (Harlesden)
- 20 May – Original 106.5 (Bristol)
- 8 June – NE1fm
- 11 June – Minster Northallerton
- 6 August – Future Radio
- 3 September – Radio Scilly
- 5 October – Seaside FM
- 8 October – Radio Cardiff
- 18 October – BRfm
- 28 October – Original 106 (Aberdeen)
- 10 December – Phoenix Radio
- 14 December – Sunshine Radio (FM)
- December – Chaine FM
- Unknown – Aberdeen Student Radio
- Unknown – Insight Radio

== Programme debuts ==
- 10 January – Laura Solon: Talking and Not Talking on BBC Radio 4 (2007–2009)
- 2 April – The Dream Ticket with George Lamb on BBC 6 Music (2007)
- 16 April – The Radcliffe and Maconie Show on BBC Radio 2 (on BBC 6 Music from 2011) (2007–Present)
- 23 April – The Unbelievable Truth on BBC Radio 4 (2007–Present)
- 25 June – Hut 33 on BBC Radio 4 (2007–2009)
- 5 September – The Lawrence Sweeney Mix on BBC Radio 4 (2007–2008)
- September – The Dream Ticket with Shaun Keaveny on BBC 6 Music (2007)
- 1 October – Fags, Mags and Bags on BBC Radio 4 (2007–2020)
- 22 October – The Dream Ticket with Gideon Coe on BBC 6 Music (2007)

== Continuing radio programmes ==
=== 1940s ===
- Sunday Half Hour (1940–2018)
- Desert Island Discs (1942–Present)
- Woman's Hour (1946–Present)
- A Book at Bedtime (1949–Present)

=== 1950s ===
- The Archers (1950–Present)
- The Today Programme (1957–Present)

=== 1960s ===
- Farming Today (1960–Present)
- In Touch (1961–Present)
- The World at One (1965–Present)
- The Official Chart (1967–Present)
- Just a Minute (1967–Present)
- The Living World (1968–Present)
- The Organist Entertains (1969–2018)

=== 1970s ===
- PM (1970–Present)
- Start the Week (1970–Present)
- You and Yours (1970–Present)
- I'm Sorry I Haven't a Clue (1972–Present)
- Good Morning Scotland (1973–Present)
- Newsbeat (1973–Present)
- File on 4 (1977–Present)
- Money Box (1977–Present)
- The News Quiz (1977–Present)
- Feedback (1979–Present)
- The Food Programme (1979–Present)
- Science in Action (1979–Present)

=== 1980s ===
- Steve Wright in the Afternoon (1981–1993, 1999–2022)
- In Business (1983–Present)
- Sounds of the 60s (1983–Present)
- Loose Ends (1986–Present)

=== 1990s ===
- The Moral Maze (1990–Present)
- Essential Selection (1991–Present)
- Wake Up to Wogan (1993–2009)
- Essential Mix (1993–Present)
- Up All Night (1994–Present)
- Wake Up to Money (1994–Present)
- Private Passions (1995–Present)
- The David Jacobs Collection (1996–2013)
- Sunday Night at 10 (1998–2013)
- In Our Time (1998–Present)
- Material World (1998–Present)
- Scott Mills (1998–2022)
- The Now Show (1998–Present)
- Jonathan Ross (1999–2010)

=== 2000s ===
- BBC Radio 2 Folk Awards (2000–Present)
- Big John @ Breakfast (2000–Present)
- Sounds of the 70s (2000–2008, 2009–Present)
- Jammin' (2001–2008)
- Go4It (2001–2009)
- The Jo Whiley Show (2001–2011)
- Kermode and Mayo's Film Review (2001–2022)
- The Big Toe Radio Show (2002–2011)
- A Kist o Wurds (2002–Present)
- Fighting Talk (2003–Present)
- Jeremy Vine (2003–Present)
- The Chris Moyles Show (2004–2012)
- Annie Mac (2004–2021)
- Elaine Paige on Sunday (2004–Present)
- The Geoff Show (2006–2008)
- The Russell Brand Show (2006–2008, 2010, 2013, 2017)
- Chris Evans Drivetime (2006–2009)
- The Bottom Line (2006–Present)
- The Christian O'Connell Breakfast Show (2006–Present)
- The Unbelievable Truth (2006–Present)

== Ending this year ==
- January – The Dream Ticket with Joe Mace (2006–2007)
- 21 January – Your Hundred Best Tunes (1959–2007)
- 22 February – Trevor's World of Sport (2004–2007)
- 17 March – Parsons and Naylor's Pull-Out Sections (2001–2007)
- April – The Dream Ticket with Shaun Keaveny (2007)
- 15 May – Dead Ringers (2000–2007, 2014–Present)
- 16 May – No Commitments (1992–2007)
- 9 August – The Personality Test (2006–2007)
- 18 August – The Day the Music Died (2003–2007)
- 18 October – The Dream Ticket with George Lamb (2007)
- 22 October – The Dream Ticket (2002–2007)
- 12 December – Parkinson's Sunday Supplement (1996–2007)

== Closing this year ==
Date	Station	Debut
29 January	River FM	2003
23 March	Saga 105.2 FM	2005
23 March	Saga 105.7 FM	2001
23 March	Saga 106.6 FM	2003
23 March	102.2 Smooth FM	2005
23 March	100.4 Smooth FM	2004
27 March	3C	1998
5 October	Radio Music Shop	2006

== Deaths ==
- 16 February – Sheridan Morley, 65, author, biographer, critic, director, actor and broadcaster
- 13 June – David Hatch, 68, radio executive and broadcaster
- 31 July – R. D. Wingfield, 79, radio dramatist and detective novelist
- 1 October – Ned Sherrin, 76, broadcaster, author and stage director
- 18 October – Mark Tavener, 53, scriptwriter
- 28 October – Anthony Clare, 64, psychiatrist and broadcaster
- 30 December – Kevin Greening, 44, radio presenter who co-hosted the Radio 1 breakfast show (1997–1998)
