= 2005 in British radio =

This is a list of events in British radio during 2005.

== Events ==
=== January ===
- 17 January – 268 radio stations, including national stations Classic FM and Virgin Radio, join together to broadcast UK Radio Aid, a twelve-hour event to raise money for the victims of the 2004 Indian Ocean earthquake and tsunami.

=== February to April ===
- No events

=== May ===
- 23 May – As BBC staff stage a one-day strike over announced job cuts, Terry Wogan crosses the picket line to present his show.

=== June ===
- 5–10 June – BBC Radio 3 clears its airwaves for almost an entire week to broadcast the music of a single composer – Ludwig van Beethoven. This is followed up at the end of the year with ten days of non-stop Johann Sebastian Bach which is broadcast in the run-up to Christmas.
- 21 June – Emap buys Scottish Radio Holdings.

=== July ===
- 7 July – 7 July 2005 London bombings: Four terrorist suicide bombings strike London's public transport system during the morning rush hour (killing 56), receiving extensive media coverage. The BBC sticks with initial reports of a power surge on the London Underground until actual events can be corroborated.
- 25 July – London's 102.2 Smooth FM signs a three-year deal with Chelsea F.C. to provide exclusive match coverage of the club's games until the end of the 2007–08 season.

=== August ===
- No events

=== September ===
- 8–12 September – BBC Radio 5 Live devotes its daytime schedule to broadcast extensive live coverage of the deciding Ashes cricket match.

=== October ===
- c. 18 October – Pirate radio stations broadcasting to the Handsworth and Lozells districts of Birmingham, most notably Hot 92, discuss an alleged rape, a contributory factor in the 2005 Birmingham riots.
- 31 October – Actress Mary Wimbush dies, aged 81, at The Mailbox studios of BBC Birmingham shortly after completing work on a recording session for The Archers.

=== November ===
- 25 November – The UK's first Islamic radio station, Islam Radio, is established in Bradford, West Yorkshire.

=== December ===
- No events

== Station debuts ==
- 21 February – Chill
- 7 June – 102.2 Smooth Radio
- 3 October – KMFM Ashford
- 1 November – Aston FM
- 25 November – Islam Radio
- 5 December – 102.6 & 106.8 Durham FM

== Programme debuts ==
- 7 January – Ed Reardon's Week on BBC Radio 4 (2005–Present)
- 4 August – The Ape That Got Lucky on BBC Radio 4 (4–25 August 2005)
- 15 September – Another Case of Milton Jones on BBC Radio 4 (2005–2010)
- 3 October – The Dream Ticket with Nemone on BBC 6 Music (2005–2006)

== Continuing radio programmes ==
=== 1940s ===
- Sunday Half Hour (1940–2018)
- Desert Island Discs (1942–Present)
- Woman's Hour (1946–Present)
- A Book at Bedtime (1949–Present)

=== 1950s ===
- The Archers (1950–Present)
- The Today Programme (1957–Present)
- Your Hundred Best Tunes (1959–2007)

=== 1960s ===
- Farming Today (1960–Present)
- In Touch (1961–Present)
- The World at One (1965–Present)
- The Official Chart (1967–Present)
- Just a Minute (1967–Present)
- The Living World (1968–Present)
- The Organist Entertains (1969–2018)

=== 1970s ===
- PM (1970–Present)
- Start the Week (1970–Present)
- You and Yours (1970–Present)
- I'm Sorry I Haven't a Clue (1972–Present)
- Good Morning Scotland (1973–Present)
- Newsbeat (1973–Present)
- File on 4 (1977–Present)
- Money Box (1977–Present)
- The News Quiz (1977–Present)
- Feedback (1979–Present)
- The Food Programme (1979–Present)
- Science in Action (1979–Present)

=== 1980s ===
- Steve Wright in the Afternoon (1981–1993, 1999–2022)
- In Business (1983–Present)
- Sounds of the 60s (1983–Present)
- Loose Ends (1986–Present)

=== 1990s ===
- The Moral Maze (1990–Present)
- Essential Selection (1991–Present)
- No Commitments (1992–2007)
- Wake Up to Wogan (1993–2009)
- Essential Mix (1993–Present)
- Up All Night (1994–Present)
- Wake Up to Money (1994–Present)
- Private Passions (1995–Present)
- Parkinson's Sunday Supplement (1996–2007)
- The David Jacobs Collection (1996–2013)
- Drivetime with Johnnie Walker (1998–2006)
- Sunday Night at 10 (1998–2013)
- In Our Time (1998–Present)
- Material World (1998–Present)
- Scott Mills (1998–2022)
- The Now Show (1998–Present)
- It's Been a Bad Week (1999–2006)
- Jonathan Ross (1999–2010)

=== 2000s ===
- Dead Ringers (2000–2007, 2014–Present)
- BBC Radio 2 Folk Awards (2000–Present)
- Sounds of the 70s (2000–2008, 2009–Present)
- Big John @ Breakfast (2000–Present)
- Parsons and Naylor's Pull-Out Sections (2001–2007)
- Jammin' (2001–2008)
- Go4It (2001–2009)
- The Jo Whiley Show (2001–2011)
- Kermode and Mayo's Film Review (2001–2022)
- The Big Toe Radio Show (2002–2011)
- A Kist o Wurds (2002–Present)
- The Day the Music Died (2003–2007)
- Fighting Talk (2003–Present)
- Jeremy Vine (2003–Present)
- Mitch Benn's Crimes Against Music (2004–2006)
- Trevor's World of Sport (2004–2007)
- The Chris Moyles Show (2004–2012)
- Annie Mac (2004–2021)
- Elaine Paige on Sunday (2004–Present)

== Ending this year ==
- 18 May – Puzzle Panel (1998–2005)
- 29 September – Jane Gazzo's Dream Ticket (2004–2005)
- October – Westway (1997–2005)
- 18 October – Think the Unthinkable (2001–2005)
- 9 November – Whispers (2003–2005)

== Closing this year ==
Date	Station	Debut
27 May	102.2 Jazz FM	1990

== Deaths ==
- 2 January – Cyril Fletcher, 91, comic monologuist
- 6 March – Tommy Vance, 63, disc jockey
- 19 March – John Ebdon, 81, radio broadcaster, Graecophile, author and director of the London Planetarium
- 7 November – Harry Thompson, 45, comedy producer, lung cancer
- 19 November – John Timpson, 77, news presenter (Today (BBC Radio 4))
- 20 November – Jonathan James-Moore, 59, former BBC Radio head of light entertainment, cancer
- 21 December – Hallam Tennyson, 85, radio producer (great-grandson of Alfred, Lord Tennyson), suspected murder
