= Handsworth riots =

Handsworth, West Midlands, in the United Kingdom, has experienced a number of riots in the last few decades.

Handsworth Riots may refer to:

- 1981 Handsworth riots
- 1985 Handsworth riots
- 1991 Handsworth riots
- 2005 Birmingham riots
- 2011 England riots (which affected Handsworth and other parts of Birmingham)
