= KDAP =

KDAP may refer to:

- KDAP-FM, a radio station (96.5 FM) licensed to serve Douglas, Arizona, United States
- KDAP (AM), a defunct radio station (1450 AM) formerly licensed to serve Douglas, Arizona
