= KSUN (Bisbee, Arizona) =

Radio station in Bisbee, Arizona (1933–1982)

- Lowell–Bisbee, Arizona; United States
- Frequency: 1230 kHz

Ownership
- Owner: The Rex Company, Inc.

History
- First air date: October 1933
- Last air date: January 1, 1982
- Former call signs: KBZB (1982–1993, never used on air)
- Call sign meaning: "Sun"

Technical information
- Facility ID: 66325
- Power: 1,000 watts day; 250 watts night

KSUN (1230 AM) was a radio station in Bisbee, Arizona. It went on the air in 1933 as one of the first radio stations in Arizona and ceased operations on January 1, 1982, though activity around the license continued for years after.

== History ==
=== KSUN ===
The Copper Electric Company received the construction permit for a new radio station in Bisbee, Arizona, at 1200 kHz on June 30, 1933. That October, after changing its call sign from the original assignment of KIGY, KSUN hit the air. It was the first radio station in Bisbee and Cochise County, and by 1935, one of just eight in the whole state. The station went to unlimited time in 1935, and a power increase to 250 watts followed the next year. In 1941, NARBA moved KSUN and other stations at 1200 to the new dial position of 1230 kHz.

In 1936, an application was filed to transfer control of the Copper Electric Company from James S. Maffeo and Lawrence R. Jackson to Carleton W. Morris, who would go on to be a pioneer in Arizona broadcasting. It was not granted immediately, but in 1941, another application was. It would be the first of several radio stations for Morris. By this time, KSUN was a CBS Radio affiliate, linked to the Arizona Network, whose key station was KOY in Phoenix. It was just one of three pre-war stations in the network, which also featured KTUC in Tucson.

Originally, KSUN was nominally licensed to Lowell, Arizona. However, in 1948, the station built new facilities in Bisbee at a cost of $50,000. Morris's influence was expanding, both in and out of radio. On December 15, 1946, KAWT went on the air in Douglas, offering NBC programming; Morris built a third station, Sierra Vista's KHFH, in 1957. Morris, meanwhile, became an Arizona state representative from Bisbee, in addition to the radio stations and an electrical repair business; the 1950s also saw Morris build one of the country's first cable television systems, with 2,000 subscribers by the end of 1955, to serve a town without direct over-the-air reception of stations in Tucson or Phoenix. In 1962, Morris had bought the facilities of the shuttered Gila Broadcasting chain for $100,000 and had asked for licenses to restart the six stations whose original licenses had been revoked by the Federal Communications Commission. However, none of that came to fruition, since Morris died of a heart attack while scuba diving in Guaymas on December 3, 1962.

Morris's estate owned KSUN for several more years and sold the station in late 1965 to Bisbee Broadcasters; the application was approved in January 1966. After the death of John L. Hogg and a buyout of Jack Williams, Arlo Woolery became the sole stockholder of the company. He sold out to Howard Waterhouse in 1968. The constant ownership turnover killed off an attempt by the company to build an FM radio station, KSUN-FM, which was deleted on November 25, 1968. Waterhouse, who moved from Fort Wayne, Indiana, to run the station, was approved to increase KSUN's power to 1,000 watts in 1971, though implementation had to be delayed until the Federal Communications Commission authorized KSUN and three other stations to carry out power increases in the absence of a response from Mexican authorities.

KSUN was sold again in 1976 to Sun Broadcasting, Inc. The president of Sun, James McCollum, held leadership positions at radio stations in Ashdown, Arkansas and Warrensburg, Missouri.

=== KBZB ===
Sun Broadcasting sold the station again to Sun Country Communications Corporation in 1980, a deal that would ultimately plunge the station into silence. Dogged by financial troubles, KSUN went off the air without warning on January 1, 1982, mired in a series of lawsuits over the Sun Country acquisition; later in the month, the company was placed into receivership. Desperate for money, the KSUN call letters were sold to a Phoenix radio station, which changed from KXIV to become the new KSUN in June 1982. The Bisbee station then became KBZB. The station's general manager in 1980 and part-owner, 36-year-old Tedd Coppin, died of a heart attack in December of that year.

Activity continued into the 1980s on the KBZB license, though it never broadcast. In early 1984, the station applied for the call letters KESE, during which time a sale to Copper Valley Broadcasters was being negotiated but fell through. In 1988, Sun Country—still in bankruptcy—was finally able to sell the station license to the Rex Company, owned by Marvin and Tommy King, which acquired KBZB for $2,000; the purchase price, however, didn't reflect the reality of what they were buying, as Marvin King told Radio & Records that the facilities were in such disrepair that a $150,000 investment would be required in a construction permit and new equipment. The station never did return to air; it was listed as silent in 1991 and had its 1990 license renewal application dismissed in 1993 because of the station's silence.
