= Postmodern marketing =

Postmodern marketing is a term derived from postmodern philosophical movements where there are cultural tendencies of inherent suspicion towards a global cultural narrative or meta-narrative. Postmodern marketing takes this same philosophical perspective and applies it to the way advertising initiatives are handled in the current post-World War II era. Postmodern marketing is approaching or has passed through a new era in advertising, branding, and strategic brand thinking. Postmodern marketing is inherently focused on customized experiences where broad market generalizations are no-longer applied or implemented on behalf of branded communications. Instead, the technique requires marketers to remove "new aged adlandia" trends and developments to focus on how the consumer prefers to be messaged to.

As a result, the ad aged "art and science" debate around creative, media, marketing and branding are put to an end. With a postmodern marketing approach a one-to-one communication is created between real humans, controlling real mouses, real computers, real keyboards and real mobile telephones.

== Origins ==
The development of postmodern marketing is built on the foundations of modern marketing (with analysis, planning, implementation and control deeply rooted in its process). Postmodern marketing however, acts more of a collection of approaches in the need to stay nimble, reactive and able to engage and shift with consumers from a non-definitive point of view. Postmodern marketing saw great acceptance in the early 1990s with the emerging developments of the Splinternet and marketers realization that "traditional" strategic practices like Porters five forces, the Wheel of Retailing, and the Boston Matrix had become outdated and not able to keep up with or report on consumer media habits, creative tone, and umbrella branding techniques. As a result, postmodern marketing was born.

== Strategies ==
In the context of marketing strategy, postmodern marketing refers to the cultural, societal, and strategic evolution of marketing practices The introduction of postmodern marketing strategies has major implications for traditional marketing techniques. Because postmodern marketing requires a deep understanding of a brand's target audience, the targeting strategy must change.

=== Integrated marketing campaigns ===
A cornerstone of postmodern marketing is the integrated marketing campaign. Integrated marketing campaigns combine multiple channels of marketing materials such as email, print displays, social media and sales promotions to maintain a consistent message across the entire campaign. This marketing strategy is effective in postmodern marketing because it maximizes the abilities of each department. Integrated marketing campaigns are most effective in postmodern marketing because of the widespread use of social media. Digital advertising through social media and email is the most effective tool to reach postmodern consumers.

=== Individualism ===
Traditional marketing has seen a stronger focus on the individual. Marketing materials become individualized under postmodern marketing strategies due to the mass adoption of the Internet. The individual consumer becomes most important to postmodern marketers because of the consumer's increasing dependence on the Internet for their exposure of marketing materials. In a postmodern society, the Internet is a prime marketing tool because it is the platform where consumers receive branded content. This feature of the Internet allows marketers to individualize and personalize branded content to consumers.

=== Brand image ===
Postmodern marketing requires a strong brand image and concept. Individual consumers respond to experiences attached to the product or brand. Postmodern marketers attach life experiences to their products. Before post modern marketing, a consumer would buy a product because it is considered to be high quality and is a reasonable price. Under postmodern marketing, that same consumer would buy the same product because it assigns a favorable narrative to their lifestyle. Postmodern marketers use narrative strategies to target the postmodern consumer. Postmodern marketers assign narratives to the product. Consumers assign those narratives to their own lives, using the brand and product narrative to create a self-image.

== Three categories of postmodern marketing ==
Although the exact origins of the term is unknown, scholarly reports date the defining of the movement to the early 1990s by the "European Journal of Marketing" author Stephen Brown. According to his findings, postmodern marketing is made up of three distinct categories (1) the idea of change, new, and complex, (2) sub-discipline of consumer research, and (3) marketing practices and research methodologies. Furthermore, as Brown implies, one who approaches marketing from postmodern style should in many ways reject attempts to impost order and working in silos. Instead markers should work collectively from with "artistic" attributes of intuition, creativity, spontaneity, speculation, emotion and involvement.

=== The idea of change, new and complex ===
The idea of change is a deeply rooted philosophy when studying postmodern marketing. When planning and strategizing within the "new now" or the "new new now" of media, technical services and creative styling a practitioner within the space must be comfortable with new and more complex systems and created worlds, platform and messaging structures. Fundamentally grounded on dramatic political and economic pressures the changing landscape illustrated the need to be nimble, direct and personalized communication and a high concern for personally identifiable information.

=== Sub-discipline of consumer research ===
To adjust with shifts in consumer consumption habits, postmodern marketing has created new disciplines to better sample, survey and poll target consumer group to better align with habit, preference and beliefs. Many call this shift a "naturalistic" or interpretive" approach, which mainly emerged from the control of non-renewable resources.

=== Marketing practices and research methodologies ===
Outcomes of redefined consumer research studies are newly defined approaches to marketing and media disciplines. Although some of these disciplines may be out dated, they illustrate core differences between postmodern marketing and modern marketing methodologies.

These approaches to marketing suggest that the role of a brand manager, digital agency, creative, media planner, account director, etc. is only defined by the company's culture that they in. Hence, a postmodern marketer is one who approaches marketing and advertising campaigns with a "thinker marker" mentality. Where they pull in and emphasize the need for creative relevance, companion media, collateral activation, social engagement, and most importantly have the means to pull it all together. Many believe that a postmodern marketing approach creates greater efficiencies, order, opportunity and a chance to gain real world insights from the perspective of the consumer. As a result, postmodern marketing like postmodernality stands as a transitory phase in 21st centuryvertising and has ushered in an era of styles and nimble techniques.

== Modern marketing approach vs. postmodern marketing approach ==
| Modern Marketing Approach | Postmodern Marketing Approach |
|---|---|
| Single World or Flat Ecosystem | Multi-Purpose World or Dimensional Ecosystem |
| Fixed | Nimble |
| Traditional | New Media |
| One-to-Many | One-to-One |
| Static | Interactive or Immersive |
| Brand Endorsed/Created Marketing | Consumer Endorsed/Created Marketing |
| Broad Generalization | Individual Customization |

== Myths ==
Postmodern marketing is not the same as "non-traditional" or digital marketing. It is instead made up only of new aged media engagements brought about by the developments like that of the iPad.

Social media belongs to the young. According to Sean Carton writer of ClickZ, the idea of social media belonging to only the young is, "Baloney". With the accelerated growth of account activation amongst the 55+ age cohort according to leading marketing research firms like Forrester, eMarketer, comScore and Nielsen, the idea of social media belonging to only the young Republicans is an inaccurate statement of fact.

== Conditions ==
According to many scholastic journals, postmodern marketing hinges on and has aided to the development of many changes to the current marketing model. Some of the more renowned conditions that postmodern marketing is known to influence and disrupt are :

- Hyper reality: Relating to simulations or simulated experiences. Tourist attractions, amusement parks and "subculture" vacation destinations are known for their ability in creating hyper-real "immersive worlds".
- Fragmentation: Adheres to many marketing disciplines. These being media space, consumer attention, consumption habits, and communication/messaging strategies.
- Reversals of production and consumption: A condition that occurs when the roles of consumer and marketer change. This is when consumers become "brand ambassadors" for a company and voice concern, opinion and align their beliefs with that of the brand through a number of traditional and non-traditional media channels.
- Decentering of the subject: Occurs when a brand personifies the product or service being marketed. As a result, the promoted item become a "Hero" or a new-age savior.
- Paradoxical juxtaposition: The ultimate state of postmodern marketing. This condition allows consumers and brand managers to act in the moment and adjust to changing landscapes, tone, pressure, and emotional cues. As a result, they are able to represent a different self-image and avoid moments of conformity to single, set brand guidelines, perceived reputations and roles.
- Loss of commitment: An outcome of many postmodern marketing experiences can result in loss of commitment amongst brand ambassadors and loyalists. This is usually driven from the inability for brand managers to adhere to or recreate the level of consumer engagement needed retain the same level of consumer interest and interaction.

== See also ==
- Postmodern brand
- Postmodern branding
