= Middle class =

Class of people in the middle of a societal hierarchy

The middle class refers to a class of people in the middle of a social hierarchy, often defined by occupation, income, education, or social status. The term has historically been associated with modernity, capitalism and political debate. Common definitions for the middle class range from the middle fifth of individuals on a nation's income ladder, to everyone but the poorest and wealthiest 20%. Theories such as "Paradox of Interest" use decile groups and wealth distribution data to determine the size and wealth share of the middle class.

Terminology differs in the United States, where the term middle class describes people who in other countries would be described as working class. There has been significant global middle-class growth over time. In February 2009, The Economist asserted that over half of the world's population belonged to the middle class, as a result of rapid growth in emerging countries. It characterized the middle class as having a substantial amount of discretionary income and defined it as beginning at the point where people have roughly a third of their income left for discretionary spending after paying for basic food and shelter.

== History and evolution of the term ==
The term "middle class" is first attested in James Bradshaw's 1745 pamphlet Scheme to prevent running Irish Wools to France. Another phrase used in early modern Europe was "the middling sort".

The term "middle class" has had several and sometimes contradictory meanings. Friedrich Engels saw the category as an intermediate social class between the nobility and the peasantry in late-feudalist society. While the nobility owned much of the countryside, and the peasantry worked it, a new bourgeoisie (literally "town-dwellers") arose around mercantile functions in the city. In France, the middle classes helped drive the French Revolution. This "middle class" eventually overthrew the ruling monarchists of feudal society, thus becoming the new ruling class or bourgeoisie in the new capitalist-dominated societies.

The modern usage of the term "middle-class", however, dates to the 1913 UK Registrar-General's report, in which the statistician T. H. C. Stevenson identified the middle class as those falling between the upper-class and the working-class. The middle class includes: professionals, managers, and senior civil servants. The chief defining characteristic of membership in the middle-class is control of significant human capital while still being under the dominion of the elite upper class, who control much of the financial and legal capital in the world.

Within capitalism, "middle-class" initially referred to the bourgeoisie; later, with the further differentiation of classes as capitalist societies developed, the term came to be synonymous with the term petite bourgeoisie. The boom-and-bust cycles of capitalist economies result in the periodic (and more or less temporary) impoverishment and proletarianization of much of the petite bourgeois world, resulting in their moving back and forth between working-class and petite-bourgeois status. The typical modern definitions of "middle class" tend to ignore the fact that the classical petite-bourgeoisie is and has always been the owner of a small-to medium-sized business whose income is derived almost exclusively from the employment of workers; "middle class" came to refer to the combination of the labour aristocracy, professionals, and salaried, white-collar workers. A broad middle class can act as a counterweight against oligarchy.

The size of the middle class depends on how it is defined, whether by education, wealth, environment of upbringing, social network, manners or values, etc. These are all related, but are far from deterministically dependent. The following factors are often ascribed in the literature on this topic to a "middle class:"

- Achievement of tertiary education.
- Holding professional qualifications, including academics, lawyers, chartered engineers, politicians, and doctors, regardless of leisure or wealth.
- Belief in bourgeois values, such as high rates of house ownership, delayed gratification, and jobs that are perceived to be secure.
- Lifestyle. In the United Kingdom, social status has historically been linked less directly to wealth than in the United States, and has also been judged by such characteristics as accent (Received Pronunciation and U and non-U English), manners, type of school attended (state or private school), occupation, and the class of a person's family, circle of friends and acquaintances.

In the United States, by the end of the twentieth century, more people identified themselves as middle-class (with insignificant numbers identifying themselves as upper-class). The Labour Party in the UK, which grew out of the organised labour movement and originally drew almost all of its support from the working-class, reinvented itself under Tony Blair in the 1990s as "New Labour", a party competing with the Conservative Party for the votes of the middle-class as well as those of the Labour Party's traditional group of voters – the working-class. Around 40% of British people consider themselves to be middle class, and this number has remained relatively stable over the last few decades.

According to the OECD, the middle class refers to households with income between 75% and 200% of the median national income.

== Political theory ==
The middle class is often described in political science as a stabilizing buffer that prevents either extremes (the high and low classes) from dominating and thus preventing authoritarianism, Aristotle being one of the first to propose this idea.

"Thus it is manifest that the best political community is formed by citizens of the middle class, [...] for the addition of the middle class turns the scale, and prevents either of the extremes from being dominant."

— Aristotle, Politics, Book 4, Chapter 11

Some modern political scientists interpret the middle class as a decentralizing force on wealth and power and thus play a crucial role in maintaining democracy by diffusing power away from central authorities. Bertrand de Jouvenel in his book On Power: The Natural History of Its Growth described a power dynamic where the high and low classes ally against the middle. In his model, the "high" (central authorities) inevitably always seek absolute authority but are prevented by the "middle" and so try to dismantle them by allying with the lower classes, the middle class being the only obstacle to complete centralization.

Barrington Moore Jr. further supported this idea in his book Social Origins of Dictatorship and Democracy arguing that the rise of both fascism and communism were caused by the lack of a strong independent bourgeois middle class.

"No bourgeois, no democracy."

— Barrington Moore Jr.

=== Marxism ===
Marxism defines social classes according to their relationship with the means of production. The main basis of social class division of Marxism: the possession of means of production, the role and position it plays in social labor organization (production process), the distribution of wealth and resources and the amount. Marxist writers have used the term middle class in various ways. In the first sense, it is used for the bourgeoisie (the urban merchant and professional class) that arose between the aristocracy and the proletariat in the waning years of feudalism in the Marxist model. Vladimir Lenin stated that the "peasantry ... in Russia constitute eight- or nine-tenths of the petty bourgeoisie". However, in modern developed countries, Marxist writers define the petite bourgeoisie as primarily comprising owners of small to medium-sized businesses, who derive their income from the exploitation of wage-laborers (and who are in turn exploited by the "big" bourgeoisie i.e. bankers, owners of large corporate trusts, etc.) as well as the highly educated professional class of doctors, engineers, architects, lawyers, university professors, salaried middle-management of capitalist enterprises of all sizes, etc. This layer which stands between the ruling capitalist "owners of the means of production" and the working class (whose income is derived solely from wages).

Louis C. Fraina (Lewis Corey), a pioneer 20th-century American Marxist theoretician, defined the middle class as "the class of independent small enterprisers, owners of productive property from which a livelihood is derived". From Fraina's perspective, this social category included "propertied farmers" but not propertyless tenant farmers. Middle class also included salaried managerial and supervisory employees but not "the masses of propertyless, dependent salaried employees. Fraina speculated that the entire category of salaried employees might be adequately described as a "new middle class" in economic terms, although this remained a social grouping in which "most of whose members are a new proletariat".

== Professional–managerial class ==
In 1977, Barbara Ehrenreich and John Ehrenreich defined a new class in the United States as "salaried mental workers who do not own the means of production and whose major function in the social division of labor ... [is] ... the reproduction of capitalist culture and capitalist class relations;" the Ehrenreichs named this group the "professional–managerial class". This group of middle-class professionals is distinguished from other social classes by their training and education (typically business qualifications and university degrees), with example occupations including academics and teachers, social workers, engineers, accountants, managers, nurses, and middle-level administrators. The Ehrenreichs developed their definition from studies by André Gorz, Serge Mallet, and others, of a "new working class", which, despite education and a perception of themselves as middle class, were part of the working class because they did not own the means of production, and were wage earners paid to produce a piece of capital. The professional–managerial class seek higher rank status and salaries and tend to have incomes above the average for their country.

== Recent global growth ==
Modern definitions of the term "middle class" are often politically motivated and vary according to the exigencies of political purpose which they were conceived to serve in the first place as well as due to the multiplicity of more- or less-scientific methods used to measure and compare wealth between modern advanced industrial states, where poverty is relatively low and the distribution of wealth more egalitarian in a relative sense, and in developing countries, where poverty and a profoundly unequal distribution of wealth crush the vast majority of the population. Many of these methods of comparison have been harshly criticised; for example, economist Thomas Piketty, in his book Capital in the Twenty-First Century, describes one of the most commonly used comparative measures of wealth across the globe, the Gini coefficient, as being an example of "synthetic indices ... which mix very different things, such as inequality with respect to labor and capital, so that it is impossible to distinguish clearly among the multiple dimensions of inequality and the various mechanisms at work."

In February 2009, The Economist asserted that over half the world's population now belongs to the middle class, as a result of rapid growth in emerging countries. It characterized the middle class as having a reasonable amount of discretionary income, so that they do not live from hand-to-mouth as the poor do, and defined it as beginning at the point where people have roughly a third of their income left for discretionary spending after paying for basic food and shelter. This allows people to buy consumer goods, improve their health care, and provide for their children's education. Most of the emerging middle class consists of people who are middle class by the standards of the developing world but not the developed one, since their money incomes do not match developed country levels, but the percentage of it which is discretionary does. By this definition, the number of middle-class people in Asia exceeded that in the West sometime around 2007 or 2008.

The Economist's article pointed out that in many emerging countries, the middle class has not grown incrementally but explosively. The point at which the poor start entering the middle class by the millions is alleged to be the time when poor countries get the maximum benefit from cheap labour through international trade, before they price themselves out of world markets for cheap goods. It is also a period of rapid urbanization, when subsistence farmers abandon marginal farms to work in factories, resulting in a several-fold increase in their economic productivity before their wages catch up to international levels. That stage was reached in China sometime between 1990 and 2005, when the Chinese "middle class" grew from 15% to 62% of the population and is just being reached in India now.

The Economist predicted that surge across the poverty line should continue for a couple of decades and the global middle class will grow exponentially between now and 2030. Based on the rapid growth, scholars expect the global middle class to be the driving force for sustainable development. This assumption, however, is contested (see below).

As the American middle class is estimated by some researchers to comprise approximately 45% of the population, The Economist's article would put the size of the American middle class below the world average. This difference is due to the extreme difference in definitions between The Economist's and many other models.

In 2010, a working paper by the OECD asserted that 1.8 billion people were now members of the global "middle class". Credit Suisse's Global Wealth Report 2014, released in October 2014, estimated that one billion adults belonged to the "middle class", with wealth anywhere between the range of $10,000–100,000.

According to a study carried out by the Pew Research Center, a combined 16% of the world's population in 2011 were "upper-middle income" and "upper income".

An April 2019 OECD report said that the millennial generation is being pushed out of the middle class throughout the Western world.

=== China ===
Since the beginning of the 21st century, China's middle class has grown by significant margins. According to the Center for Strategic and International Studies, by 2013, some 420 million people, or 31%, of the Chinese population qualified as middle class. Based on the World Bank definition of middle class as those having with daily spending between $10 and $50 per day, nearly 40% of the Chinese population were considered middle class as of 2017.

=== Germany ===
In 2017, Andreas Reckwitz described two middle classes in Germany: the new middle class and the old middle class. The new middle class consists primarily of "highly qualified academics in large cities with good career prospects, especially in the knowledge economy". Although this new middle class has a high ecological footprint, for example due to frequent air travel, it nevertheless considers ecologically responsible behavior to be important. The old middle class are "people with a medium level of education, often in small-town rural regions, who tend to be conservative and traditional in their attitudes and lifestyles."

=== India ===
Estimates vary widely on the number of middle-class people in India. A 1983 article put the Indian middle class as somewhere between 70 and 100 million. According to one study the middle class in India stood at between 60 and 80 million by 1990. According to The Economist, 78 million of India's population are considered middle class as of 2017, if defined using the cutoff of those making more than $10 per day, a standard used by the India's National Council of Applied Economic Research. If including those with incomes between $2 and $10 per day, the number increases to 604 million. This was termed by researchers as the "new middle class". Measures considered include geography, lifestyle, income, and education. The World Inequality Report in 2018 further concluded that elites (i.e. the top 10%) are accumulating wealth at a greater rate than the middle class, that rather than growing, India's middle class may be shrinking in size.

=== Africa ===
According to a 2014 study by Standard Bank economist Simon Freemantle, a total of 15.3 million households in 11 surveyed nations of Africa are middle class: Angola, Ethiopia, Ghana, Kenya, Mozambique, Nigeria, South Sudan, Sudan, Tanzania, Uganda, and Zambia. In South Africa, a report conducted by the Institute for Race Relations in 2015 estimated that 10–20% of South Africans are middle class, based on various criteria. An earlier study estimated that in 2008 21.3% of South Africans were members of the middle class.

A study by EIU Canback indicates 90% of Africans fall below an income of $10 a day. The proportion of Africans in the $10–20 middle class (excluding South Africa) rose from 4.4% to only 6.2% between 2004 and 2014. Over the same period, the proportion of "upper middle class" income ($20–50 a day) went from 1.4% to 2.3%.

According to a 2014 study by the German Development Institute, the middle class of Sub-Saharan Africa rose from 14 million to 31 million people between 1990 and 2010.

=== Latin America ===
Over the years estimates on the size of the Latin America's middle class have varied. A 1960 study stated that the middle strata in Latin America as a whole, exclusive of Indians, constituted just under 20% of the national society. A 1964 study estimated that 45 million Latin Americans belonged to the urban middle class while 15 million belonged to the urban well-to-do and 8 million to the rural middle class and well-to-do. In Brazil, according to one estimate, in 1970 the lower middle class comprised 12% of the population, while the upper middle class comprised 3%. In the mid-1970s it was estimated by one authority that the Brazilian middle class comprised between 15 and 25% of the population. A 1969 economic survey estimated that 15% of Brazilians belonged to the middle class. Another study has estimated that in 1970 the lower middle class comprised 12.5% of the population of Brazil, while the upper middle class comprised 3% and the upper class 1.5%.

By 1970, according to one study, the middle class of Argentina comprised 38% of the economically active population, compared with 19% in Brazil and 24% in Mexico. According to a 1973 study on Mexico, the well-to middle class (which included technicians, professionals, merchants, industrialists, and landholders) made up 11% of the population, while the middle class proper (which included merchants, small farmers, teachers and bureaucrats) made up 19% of the population. In addition, the upper class made up 5% of the population, while 65% of the population included workers, slum dwellers and peasants. A later study on Mexico from 1975 estimated that the middle class in 1968 (defined as families earning between 2,000 and 5,000 pesos annually) comprised 36.4% of the population, while the upper class (defined as families earning over 5,000 pesos annually) comprised 9.4% of the population and the lower class (defined as families earning less than 2,000 pesos annually) comprised 53.9% of the population.

According to a study by the World Bank, the number of Latin Americans who are middle class rose from 103 million to 152 million between 2003 and 2009.

=== Russia ===
Due to sustainable growth, the pre-crisis level was exceeded. In 2015, research from the Russian Academy of Sciences estimated that around 15% of the Russian population are "firmly middle class", while around another 25% are "on the periphery".

== See also ==
- American middle class – Social class in the United States
- British class system – Social structure of British society
- Classlessness – Society in which no one is born into a social class
- Cultural determinism – Concept in social science
- Kulak – Wealthy Russian independent farmers
- The Lonely Crowd – 1950 book by David Riesman
- Lower middle class – Social class which is a sub-division of the greater middle class
- Lower class – Hierarchical stratification of societies
- Middle-class squeeze – Decline in middle-class real wages and increase in economic inequality
- Occupational prestige – Public perception of an individual's job
- One-third hypothesis
- Status paradox#Status paradox of migration
- Upper middle class – Social class
