= Radio source =

Radio source may refer to:

- An astronomical radio source
- A radio transmitter
- The Radio Open Source podcast and blog

== See also ==
- Radio noise source, a device that emits radio waves at a certain frequency, used to calibrate radio telescope
- Source Radio, a radio station operating from Coventry, England
