= Harborough (disambiguation) =

Harborough is a town in Leicestershire, England.

Harborough may also refer to:

== Associated with the English town ==
- Harborough District, local government district
- Harborough, Oadby and Wigston (UK Parliament constituency)
- Harborough Town F.C., a football club
- Harborough FM, a local radio station

== Other meanings ==
- Harborough Magna, a village in Warwickshire, England
