= Urban riot =

Riots following rapid urbanization

Riots often occur in reaction to a perceived grievance or out of dissent. Riots may be the outcome of a sporting event, although many riots have occurred due to poor working or living conditions, government oppression, conflicts between races or religions.

Rapid urbanization has led to the rise of urban riots. John F. McDonald and Daniel P. McMillen have identified Los Angeles's Watts Riots, in 1965, as the first "urban riots" in the United States. They were a part of what were known as race riots of the civil rights period.

== List of urban riots ==
This is a list of riots that have occurred, mostly in the United States and the UK, in the context of urban conditions and more broadly urban decay.

=== Pre-1960s ===
1863 New York City draft riots
13–16 July 1863, Lower Manhattan, New York City, US. Riots carried out by members of the white working class, predominantly protesting against draft laws passed that year in the context of the American Civil War, but also against perspectives of mixed race neighborhoods.

1909 Greek Town Riot
21 February 1909, South Omaha, Nebraska, US. During a period of economic downturn in the city, a successful community of Greeks in Omaha, Nebraska was burnt to the ground by a mob from Omaha. This happened after they almost lynched a Greek immigrant accused of having sex with a Protestant woman. A federal trial brought by the Greek consul to the United States ends in stagnation. No person is ever convicted.

1917 East St. Louis Riot
July, 1917, East Saint Louis, IL, US.

1919 Chicago Race Riot
27 July-2 August 1919 Chicago, IL, US. An African American teenager, Eugene Williams, who was swimming in Lake Michigan drifted near a beach that whites considered their own. A white man on a breakwater assailed the black youth with stones and the youth drowned. The white Chicago police officers who investigated the incident refused to arrest the assailant. The tension escalated into riots between blacks and whites. The Governor of Illinois, Frank Lowden, called in the Illinois National Guard to quell the unrest, but at least 38 people were killed and 500 injured over a period of seven days.

1921 Tulsa race massacre
31 May-1 June 1921, Tulsa, Oklahoma, US.

1935 Harlem Riot
19 March 1935, New York City, US

1949 Anacostia Pool Riot
29 June 1949, Washington, D.C. US

1958 Notting Hill race riots
late August and early September 1958, London, UK

=== 1960s ===
Rochester 1964 race riot
24–26 July 1964

Cyprus crisis of 1963–64
Major riots in the cities of Nicosia, Famagusta and Larnaca led to the division of Cyprus, and its two communities, the Turkish and Greek Cypriots.

Harlem riot of 1964
16–22 July 1964, New York City, New York, provoked by the NYPDs shooting of black teenager James Powell.

Philadelphia 1964 race riot
28–30 August 1964, Philadelphia, Pennsylvania, US, Allegations of police brutality sparked the Columbia Avenue race riots.

Watts Riots
11 August 1965, Los Angeles, California, US, The McCone Commission investigated the riots finding that causes included poverty, inequality, racial discrimination and the passage, in November 1964, of Proposition 14 on the California ballot overturning the Rumford Fair Housing Act, which established equality of opportunity for black home buyers.

Hough Riots
18 July 1966, Cleveland, Ohio, US, The underlying causes of the riots may found in the social conditions that exist in the ghettos of Cleveland.

Racial tension in Omaha, Nebraska
5 July 1966, North Omaha, Nebraska, US, More than 500 black youth gathered to protest the absence of recreation programs and jobs storm a local business district, throwing rocks and bricks at Jewish-owned businesses in the area. The National Guard is called in after three days of random violence and organized raids.

1967 Newark riots
12 July 1967, Newark, New Jersey, US, Factors that contributed to the Newark Riot: police brutality, political exclusion of blacks from city government, urban renewal, inadequate housing, unemployment, poverty, and rapid change in the racial composition of neighborhoods.

1967 Plainfield riots
14 July 1967, Plainfield, New Jersey, US

12th Street riot
23 July 1967, Detroit, Michigan, US, The origins of urban unrest in Detroit were rooted in a multitude of political, economic, and social factors including police abuse, lack of affordable housing, urban renewal projects, economic inequality, black militancy, and rapid demographic change.

Minneapolis-Saint Paul
US, Fall 1967. Racial tensions boil over in North Minneapolis as whites continue to leave the decaying core of the inner city bound for the suburbs.

1968 Chicago, Illinois riots
4 April 1968 Violence erupted in Chicago's black ghetto on the west side, eventually consuming a 28-block stretch of West Madison Street. Looting and arson took place primarily in the corridor between Roosevelt Road on the south and Chicago Avenue on the north.

1968 Washington, D.C. riots
4 April 1968, Washington, D.C., US, A report from National Advisory Commission on Civil Disorders identified discrimination and poverty as the root causes of the riots that erupted in cities around the nation during the late 1960s and in Washington, DC in April 1968

Baltimore riot of 1968
4 April 1968, Baltimore, Maryland, US

Glenville Shootout
23 July 1968, Cleveland, Ohio, US, Shootout between black militant organization led by Ahmed Evans and Cleveland Police Department attracted large and hostile black crowds that caused a four-day riot

Stonewall riots
June 1969, New York City, New York, a turning point for the modern U.S. gay rights movement.

1969 North 24th Street Riots
24 June 1969, North Omaha, Nebraska US, An Omaha police officer fatally shoots a teenager in the back of the head during a gathering of youth in local public housing projects. Many youth and adults from the local African American community gather in the local business district, routinely burning and otherwise destroying non-Black-owned businesses.

=== 1970s ===
1970 Memorial Park riot
August 24, 1970, Royal Oak, MI, US. A civil disturbance by alienated white youths that began in Royal Oak, Michigan, and spread to Birmingham, Michigan, both primarily white middle class suburbs of Detroit. The initial conflict resulted from the closure by police of Memorial Park in Royal Oak. Authorities said that the park was being used as a marketplace for the sale of illegal drugs. The riot lasted for three days, and led to the formation of several youth controlled social service organizations.

1976 Soweto uprising, Johannesburg, South Africa
1976: The Soweto Uprising : Massive reaction to education laws under apartheid, bloodily suppressed

New York City blackout of 1977
13 July 1977, New York City, US, That massive blackout was viewed by some as one symptom of the city's decline.

1979 Southall Riot (Blair Peach)
23 April 1979, London, England

=== 1980s ===
1980 St. Pauls riot
2 April 1980, Bristol, England

Arthur McDuffie
8 May 1980, Miami, Florida, US, black outrage at "a double standard of justice"

1981 Brixton riot
11 April 1981, London, England

1981 Toxteth riots
5 July 1981, Liverpool, England

1981 University of Puerto Rico/Rio Piedras Riots
1981, Rio Piedras, Puerto Rico

1981 Chapeltown race riot
1981, Leeds, England

1980s Handsworth race riots
10 July 1981, Birmingham, England

1985 Brixton riot
28 September 1985, Brixton, London, England

1985 Broadwater Farm Riot
6 October 1985, Tottenham, London, England

1985 Toxteth riots
1 October 1985, Liverpool, England

1985 Peckham riots
1 October 1985, London, England, A report by Lord Scarman acknowledged much of the widespread unrest had its roots in social and economic deprivation and in racial discrimination.

=== 1990s ===
1991 Washington, D.C. riot
5–7 May 1991, Washington, DC

Crown Heights Riot
19 August 1991, New York City, US

Meadow Well Riots
9 September 1991, Newcastle upon Tyne, England

1992 Los Angeles riots
29 April 1992, Los Angeles, California, US

Riot of Rostock-Lichtenhagen
22–24 August 1992, Rostock, Germany

Brixton riot (1995)
13 December 1995, London, England, Alex Owolade, chairman of the anti-racist group Movement for Justice, said the violence was a rebellion against years of "racist injustice" by police in an impoverished area plagued by racial tension.

Jakarta riots of May 1998
May 1998, Indonesia, triggered by economic decline; problems were both urban and rural

=== 2000s ===
2001 Cincinnati riots
10 April 2001, Cincinnati, Ohio, US, An Enquirer reporter, Kristina Goetz, reported that the lack of progress on perennial inner-city problems such as inadequate child and health care, failing schools, and low rates of minority home ownership was a contributing factor.

Oldham Riots
26 May 2001, Greater Manchester, England, which were sparked by racial tension between the white and Asian communities.

Benton Harbor riots
16 June 2003, Benton Harbor, Michigan

2004 Redfern riots
14 February 2004, Sydney, Australia

2005 Macquarie Fields riots
25 February 2005, Sydney, Australia, There is an open debate about the cause of this riot. One side cites economic factors and racism.

2005 Toledo Riot
15 October 2005, Toledo, Ohio, US, Residents at forum named poverty, above other causes, as the kindling for the riot.

2005 Birmingham riots
22 October 2005, Birmingham, England, Many white and more affluent African-Caribbean residents have moved out of Birmingham, signaling a rapid change in the racial composition of neighborhoods.

2005 civil unrest in France
2005 Paris, France

2005 Cronulla riots
2005 Sydney, Australia

2006 Dublin riots
February 2006, Dublin, Ireland

2006 protests in Hungary
September–October 2006, Budapest, Hungary

2008 Greek riots
December 2008, Athens and other major cities of Greece.

=== 2010s ===
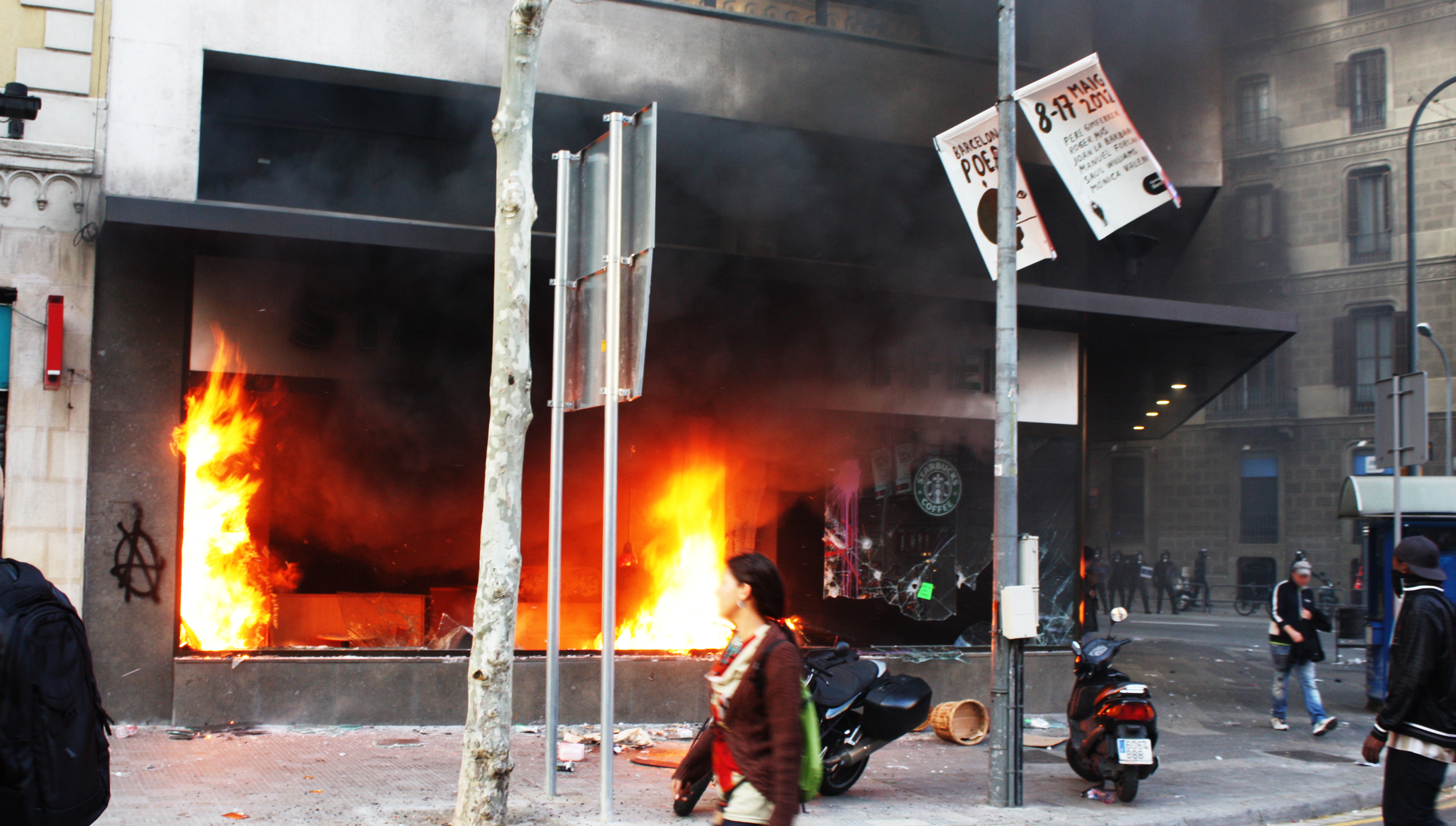
Starbucks is set on fire during riot against austerity measures, Barcelona.

2010 Kyrgyzstani uprising
April–May 2010, Bishkek and other cities in Kyrgyzstan.

May 2010 Greek protests
May 2010, Throughout Greece to protest public spending cuts.

2011 Stanley Cup riot
15 June 2011, Vancouver, British Columbia.

2011 England riots
From 6 August 2011, initially in Tottenham, London, later in many other parts of London and some other major English cities.

2014 Hrushevskoho Street riots
From 23 February 2014, initially in Hrushevskoho Street, Kyiv, Ukraine, 12 anti-protest laws were repealed and Prime Minister Mykola Azarov tendered his resignation and a bill offering amnesty to arrested and charged protesters was issued.

2014 Ferguson unrest
Precipitated by 9 August 2014 fatal shooting of 18-year-old Michael Brown by local police in Ferguson, Missouri, US.

2015 Baltimore riots
Protests began after the death of Freddie Gray on 12 April 2015. Protests escalated to violence, looting, and arson on the day of Gray's funeral Monday 27 April 2015.

2019–2020 Hong Kong protests
Precipitated by the introduction of Fugitive Offenders amendment bill on extradition in response to a murder case in Taiwan. Protests escalated to violence and arson despite the withdrawal of the bill.

=== 2020s ===
George Floyd protests
May 2020 – 2021, Nationwide rioting in the aftermath of protests caused by the murder of George Floyd.

2021 storming of the United States Capitol
January 6, 2021, The United States Capitol Building was stormed by supporters of outgoing-President Donald Trump during the 2021 United States Electoral College vote count.

== See also ==
- Sectarian violence
- One-third hypothesis
