= Hot 92 =

Hot 92 can refer to:

- Hot 92 (pirate radio station) in Birmingham, England
- WJHT in Johnstown, Pennsylvania
