= Handsworth =

Handsworth may refer to:

- Handsworth, West Midlands, a suburb of Birmingham in the West Midlands, United Kingdom
  - Handsworth riots (disambiguation)
  - Handsworth Wood, an area adjacent to the above
  - Birmingham Handsworth (UK Parliament constituency) was centred on this area
- Handsworth, South Yorkshire, a suburb of Sheffield in Yorkshire, United Kingdom
- Handsworth, Saskatchewan, a hamlet in Saskatchewan, Canada
- Handsworth Secondary School, District of North Vancouver, British Columbia, Canada
- Handsworth F.C., an English football club based in Worksop
