= CUSU =

CUSU can refer to:

- Cambridge University Students' Union
- Cardiff University Students' Union
- Coventry University Students' Union
