= Interaction frequency =

In sociology, interaction frequency is the total number of social interactions per unit time. Interactions, or what Georg Simmel in his pioneering work called Wechselwirkungen, are the basis for society itself, according to Herbert Blumer.

== Overview ==
Interaction can be either direct or indirect.

- Interaction is direct, Hugo O. Engelmann explained, when participants exchange roles.
- It is indirect when roles cannot be exchanged.

Face-to-face conversations, phone calls, and on-line chats are direct interactions. TV shows, radio programs, videos and books are forms of indirect interaction. In other words, interaction occurs when one person perceives the behavior of another, whether or not the other is present.

For dyads in small groups, direct interactions sum to $n(n-1)/2$, where n is the size of the population. Indirect interactions equal $n(n-1)$. Indirect interactions, then, are roughly twice as likely as direct interactions.

For large populations counting the number of direct interactions is not possible. However, as John Engelmann showed, the number can be estimated by multiplying the total number of miles traveled times the density of the population. A somewhat more sensitive estimate could be to multiply miles traveled times the square root of population density.

The number of indirect interactions can be estimated through an analysis of online traffic. Andrew Lipsman, for example, reported that of the 2 million users that comScore samples, 6% account for approximately 50% of the Internet traffic.

Interaction rests, first of all, on the fact that behavior varies in intensity. Individuals can be soft-spoken and thoughtful one moment, or cheerful and jumping for joy the next. Onlookers are apt to notice intense behavior, and thereby interact with the person whose behavior is most intense.

In addition to intensity, behavior varies in complexity. It can be intricate one moment and simple the next. In other words, interactions can be behavior limiting, dynamically neutral, or behavior enlarging, respectively decreasing, maintaining, or increasing behavioral complexity.

== Classic example ==
Theoretically, intensity and complexity are negatively correlated. The classic example of yelling "fire" in a theater illustrates that. Intensity increases, complexity declines, and alternatives diminish to fright, flight, and fight. Aristotle seems to have been the first to suggest a connection between intensity and reduced alternatives. In his view, "If we take intense delight in one thing, we cannot do anything else at all."

Hypothetically, as interaction frequency increases, interactive behavior becomes more intense, less complex, and increasingly repetitive. As the world’s population grows, and people interact with each other at an ever swifter pace, horizontal power structures replace vertical ones, and violence escalates.

With the advent of the Internet, a share of violence seems to have shifted, intriguingly, from direct to indirect interaction. Ranting, raving, and threatening gestures have escalated in the blogosphere. Meanwhile, cultural closure has taken on a new form called cyberbalkanization. In other words, individuals interact frequently and almost exclusively with people like themselves.

== See also ==
- Dynamic density
- One-third hypothesis
- Socionics
