= Hugo O. Engelmann =

American behavioural scientist (1917–2002)

- Born: September 11, 1917; Vienna, Austria
- Died: February 2, 2002 (aged 84)
- Education: University of Wisconsin–Madison
- Scientific career
- Fields: Sociology; Anthropology; Systems theory
- Workplaces: Northern Illinois University; University of Wisconsin–Milwaukee; Michigan State University

Hugo Otto Engelmann (September 11, 1917 – February 2, 2002) was an American sociologist, anthropologist and general systems theorist. Throughout his work he emphasized the significance of history.

== Biography ==
Born September 11, 1917, in Vienna, Austria, Engelmann arrived in the United States in 1939, just two weeks before World War II broke out in Europe. Having fled first to Czechoslovakia and later to France as a result of the German annexation of Austria in 1938, he worked as a laborer in the fields of France until he was able to sail to America, as recorded in Journey Into a New Life.

Following graduate school at the University of Wisconsin–Madison he taught at Michigan State University in East Lansing, at the University of Wisconsin–Milwaukee, and at Northern Illinois University, DeKalb. Towards the end of the 1950s he was among the first members of the Society for General Systems Research. He was the first editor of the Wisconsin Sociologist 1960–62, then again in 1965–70. In 1963 Engelmann was president of the Wisconsin Sociological Association. He is named in Austrian Social Scientists in Exile 1933-1945.

In the 1960s Engelmann regularly participated in civil rights marches and was a strong advocate for racial and gender equality at a time when neither could be taken for granted even at universities. In the early 1970s one of his papers - an analysis of bussing and neighborhood schools—was quoted in a successful desegregation suit of Milwaukee Public Schools initiated by Lloyd Barbee.

From 1969 until he retired Professor Emeritus in 1989 he taught, wrote, and traveled throughout the US and Europe. Retirement did not change much. He continued his active correspondence with colleagues and former students for 30 years and more. He remained active in sociology until his death on February 2, 2002, in DeKalb, Illinois.

His wife Ruth is author of Leaf House: Days of Remembering. Their son John is a lawyer and was sometimes a co-author of Engelmann's articles.

== Work ==
For most of his life he was first and foremost a sociologist. Ethnicity and religion were distant runners up. He was a strong supporter of intellectual freedom, equal rights, civil liberties, and workers. That spirit is evident in the first Wisconsin Sociologist journal—today called Sociological Imagination. It insisted it was "a journal of communication, published cooperatively by its contributors, under the auspices of WSA Wisconsin Sociological Association. Communications may cover any subject matter of concern to social scientists in their respective roles as scientific workers, teachers, and professional employees."

About injustice he had this to say, "...when we restrict the behavioral development of others, we are depriving ourselves of interactive opportunities, and limit our own development. Thus, we can say in a very real sense that 'Whatsoever we shall do unto the least of them, we shall have done to ourselves.'"

=== Population Expansion and the Social System ===
Through billions of small-scale social interactions society changes in piecemeal ways and often in contradictory directions. Still, the overall thrust of social change can be discerned. In his 1967 paper "Population Expansion and the Social System," Engelmann outlined his basic theory. As the world's population increases people interact with each other more and more frequently due to crowding, migration, and travel. Freedom declines, power exercise at first increases but later abates (see also Engelmann and Cash, 1981),) and violence becomes boundless.

Beyond a certain point totalitarian power structures eclipse authoritarian ones. Sheer amounts of interaction transform vertical power structures into horizontal ones as more and more people exercise power over each other. In "Orwell, Modern Thought, and Totalitarianism" Engelmann drew a stark distinction between authoritarian and totalitarian societies. "Authoritarian police officials aiming at outward compliance suppress activities considered undesirable. Totalitarian leaders look for inner conviction expressed in positive enthusiasm or contrite confession."

=== Other 1960s papers ===
In his paper "A Sociohistorical Perspective for East European Developments" he made his point even more forcefully, "While totalitarianism derives from psychological rigidity, authoritarian rule depends on external enforcement of regulations through power exercise."

His anthropological views were laid out in "The Activity Bias of Ethnography and the History of Society" (1960). Researchers are prone to focus on the physical manifestations of people's activity, such as pottery, tools, or weapons, but ignore their experiential patterns. As technology becomes more and more developed researchers all too often conclude that society is increasing in complexity. They ignore the possibility that activity expands at expense to experiential intricacy.

Engelmann's historical perspective was especially evident in "The European Empire: From Charlemagne to the Common Market" (1962). The geographic similarity between Charlemagne's Empire and that of the Common Market almost twelve-hundred years later was attributed to similar phases of migration patterns. Like the outward expansion of Charlemagne's forces, a similar pattern was noticed in the Common Market. Even Charlemagne's capital, Aachen, is a mere 75 miles from NATO headquarters in Brussels. Matthew Omolesky, in his 2009 article about the European Union, "Between Rome and Byzantium," cites Engelmann's observation about the geographic similarity between the Common Market and Charlemagne's Empire too.

A recurring theme in Engelmann's work refers to professional manipulators engaging others in activity for its own sake regardless of its nature or consequences. In his last paper, "Science under Siege", he warned of two sorts of religion edging their way into science. The first is the supernaturalist view, the sort of view held by Creationists. The second is more subtile. It is the naturalist view. Advocates of either notion urge us to believe things that cannot be put to the test. Whether God created the heavens and the earth in six days or whether there are parallel universes have nothing whatsoever to do with science no matter how gladly true believers would have it so. Central to all science is the testable hypothesis. If it is not there, we are not talking about science.

=== Sociology of knowledge ===
Great theories generate numerous testable hypotheses. Engelmann's theory was very successful in that regard. His hypotheses were on target whether about aggression, random violence, cultural closure, anti-intellectualism, diminishing freedoms, or scientific viewpoints. In the late 1960s when riots were common place and everyone blamed everyone else, Engelmann sought answers to questions no one else was asking. Statistically speaking, how do groups emerge? In terms of probability how can they persist? The questions involve two mathematical curves. One represents the likelihood that a subgroup of a specific size will emerge; the other is the probability that it will persist. The product of the two curves provided the answer for the one-third hypothesis in 1967. Those groups most likely to emerge and to persist are the ones that amount to one-third of the total population, whether they be ethnic enclaves in the city, students protesting in the streets, social movements coming to the fore, or local governments on the rise.

Most intriguing was Engelmann's concept central to almost all his hypotheses. Both the intensity and complexity of an average individual's behavior cannot increase simultaneously. As one goes up the other goes down. Twenty-three centuries after Aristotle we find an explanation for his assertion, "If we take intense delight in one thing, we cannot do anything else at all." We also find that behavioral intensity increases with rising interaction frequency even as complexity declines. Therein lies the source of both power exercise and the widespread approval of it in modern times.

Engelmann's sociology of knowledge carefully distinguished between total relativism and intellectually adequate work. In other words, “…ideas limited by one’s own social position will be biased…Engelmann argued that scientific observations (and laws) are societally invariate--true across the entire society.”

In Engelmann's office hung two photos, one of Martin Luther King Jr., the other of Albert Einstein. Each in his own way underscored the fact that society is a network of direct and indirect interactions. Their views on society, which were very similar to those of Engelmann, became many years later the source of an article by one of his former students called "The Preacher and the Physicist".

== See also ==
- Interaction frequency
- One-third hypothesis

== Publications ==
Engelmann wrote six books and at least fifty articles, a selection:

- 1953. Methodological and Philosophical Bases of Social Scientific Theory. Dissertation University of Wisconsin, Madison.
- 1956. The evaluation modality test. Psychometric Affiliates.
- 1957. A systemic dynamic approach to social theory.
- 1966. Theoretical Sociology: Its Bases and Place in Modern Science.
- 1966. Essays in Social Theory and Social Organization. W. C. Brown Book Co.
- 1969. Sociology A Guided Study Text. Kendall/Hunt Pub. Co.
- 1976. Marx as an Upper-class Ideologist.
- 1980. Behavior, Interaction, and Social Organization.
- 1993. Problems of Sociological Inquiry.
- 2002. Journey into a New Life.Carmel, IN, Simudell Publishers.
