= KSUN =

Radio station in Phoenix

- Phoenix, Arizona; United States
- Broadcast area: Phoenix metropolitan area
- Frequency: 1400 kHz
- Branding: La Mejor 106.5 FM / 1400 AM

Programming
- Format: Regional Mexican
- Affiliations: MVS Radio

Ownership
- Owner: Marquez Communications, Inc.; (Fiesta Radio, Inc.)

History
- First air date: August 28, 1954
- Former call signs: KONI (1954–1961); KXIV (1961–1982)
- Call sign meaning: Valley of the Sun (a common nickname for the Phoenix area)

Technical information
- Licensing authority: FCC
- Facility ID: 21430
- Class: C
- Power: 1,000 watts unlimited
- Transmitter coordinates: 33°23′23″N 111°59′52″W
- Translator: 106.5 K293CO (Phoenix)

Links
- Public license information: Public file; LMS
- Webcast: Listen live
- Website: lamejorarizona.com

KSUN (1400 AM) is a Spanish-language radio station broadcasting out of Phoenix, Arizona, and serving the Phoenix metropolitan area. It is locally owned by the Marques brothers and operates a regional Mexican music format under the branding "La Mejor". The station simulcasts on translator station K293CO (106.5 FM). KSUN is also the Spanish-language play-by-play home of Phoenix Suns basketball games and Phoenix Rising FC soccer matches.

== History ==
The station signed on August 28, 1954, as KONI, the ninth radio station in Phoenix, Arizona; originally KBLR, the station's call sign changed by the time it signed on. KONI became KXIV in 1961. Until 1982, KXIV was programmed with a middle of the road (MOR) music format. The station was co-owned by Ira Lavin and actor Dick Van Dyke (an Arizona resident). Disc jockeys included George Scott, Jack Dey, Jim Hutton, Paul B. Mundt, and Jim Spero (who also served as program director).

Van Dyke and Lavin sold KXIV in 1982 to local real estate developer Michael Levin, who relaunched the station with a news/talk format as KSUN, featuring personalities from ABC's TalkRadio Network, NBC's Talknet and audio from CNN2. The call letters had been sold to Levin by the previous KSUN in Bisbee, at the time silent and in receivership. Hourly discount auctions through a segment called "BarterBank" were also heavily advertised. Levin's tenure running KSUN was marred by suspicious vandalism and layoffs. The station fell into bankruptcy and went silent on Memorial Day weekend 1983.

CAZ Broadcasting bought KSUN out of bankruptcy in 1984 and brought the station back the next year as an affiliate of the original Radio AAHS, a radio service developed for children, with adult-oriented music at night. By 1986, KSUN was running jazz full-time with minor league baseball play-by-play of the Phoenix Firebirds, having lost Radio AAHS when Children's Radio Network opted to cease distributing it outside of its owned-and-operated stations. After an abortive attempt to sell the station to TransCom, owners of KLZI, and going silent again at the end of summer, Fiesta Radio purchased the station in November 1986. Radio Fiesta officially signed on March 23, 1987. The station became a sports play-by-play specialist; it was the long-time home of Spanish broadcasts of the Arizona Diamondbacks (now on KQBU-FM), first carrying all 162 games in 2004, and continues to carry Phoenix Suns games. In 2021, the station broadcast Phoenix Rising FC games.

KSUN La Mejor logo before translator sign on

In 2015, the station partnered with Mexican radio company MVS Radio to launch its regional Mexican La Mejor format in Phoenix.
