= Austrian social scientists in exile (1933–1945) =

With the rise of National Socialism (National Socialism, Nazism) numerous artists, scientists and writers fled to other lands. Among them were many Austrian social scientists. Often they left because of their ancestry and frequently because of their political views. More than 350 names of social scientists (and sometimes their pseudonyms) are listed on the database at the University of Graz, Austria. A number of names are well known in America or Great Britain because it was there that they built new lives. The list is by no means complete and is based on the sole fact that each writer published at least one book or a number of journal articles.

Included among Austrian social scientists in exile are Alfred Adler, Otto Bauer, Peter Blau, Berger, Bruno Bettelheim, Rudolf Carnap, Deutsch, Peter Drucker, Erik Erikson, Hugo O. Engelmann, Sigmund Freud, Heider, Keller, Arthur Koestler, Lukács, Karl Mannheim, Karl Polanyi, Pollard, Karl Popper, Possony, Schumpeter, Tietze, and Ullmann.

== Sources ==
- Müller, Reinhard and Christian Fleck. 2000. "Österreichische Soziologinnen und Soziologen im Exil 1933 bis 1945," University of Graz.
