= KDAP (AM) =

Radio station in Douglas, Arizona

- Douglas, Arizona; United States
- Broadcast area: Southeast Cochise County Arizona and Northern Sonora, Mexico
- Frequency: 1450 kHz
- Branding: Radio Cristiana

Programming
- Format: Defunct (was Spanish Christian)

Ownership
- Owner: Alex Goodman

History
- First air date: February 11, 1947
- Last air date: October 4, 2021
- Former call signs: KAWT (1947–1977)
- Call sign meaning: Douglas/Agua Prieta

Technical information
- Facility ID: 33760
- Class: C
- Power: 1,000 watts (unlimited)
- Transmitter coordinates: 31°21′18″N 109°33′06″W

KDAP (1450 AM, "Radio Cristiana") was a radio station licensed to serve Douglas, Arizona, United States. The station was last owned by Alex Goodman. It aired a Spanish language Christian radio format.

== History ==
This station first went on the air on Feb. 11, 1947 with a power of 250 watts, using the call letters KAWT. This was the second radio station to go on the air in southeast Arizona (Cochise County); the first station, KSUN, in Bisbee, had signed on the air 1933. Both stations were owned by Carleton W. Morris. In February 1971, the station requested permission to increase the power to 1,000 watts. Due to the station's proximity to Mexico (less than 2 miles), permission was needed from the Mexican government as well as the Federal Communications Commission (FCC). A temporary power increase to 500 watts was granted in November 1971. In August 1973, final approval was given to increase the power to 1,000 watts, both day and night with a non-directional pattern.

The call letters were changed to KDAP on September 1, 1977. KDAP stands for Douglas/ Agua Prieta, the towns on both sides of the border served by this station. In March 1990, a sister station went on the air, KDAP-FM (96.5 MHz)

In April 2015, Alex Goodman purchased KDAP for the price of $55,000. The terms were reported to be $10,000 down with the balance of $45,000 to be paid over the next 10 years at 10% interest. Alex Goodman did not purchase the sister station KDAP-FM, however, he continued to operate the station from its existing location by leasing studio and tower space from the previous owner.

The Federal Communications Commission cancelled KDAP's license on October 4, 2021, due to the station failing to file an application to renew its license.

== History of ownership ==
1947–1959 Carleton Morris

1959–1975 Hillcrest Broadcasting (Herbert Newcomb)

1975–1984 Russwal Corp. (Russ Walker)

1984–1997 KDAP Inc. (Howard Henderson)

1997–2005 KASA Radio Hogar

2005–2015 Douglas Broadcasting (Howard Henderson)

2015–2021 Alex Goodman

== FCC violations ==
In March 2002, then-owner KASA Radio Hogar of Phoenix Az. was fined $15,000 by the FCC for "failing to properly maintain the antenna" of KDAP. In its filing asking that the fine be reduced, KASA Radio Hogar described KDAP as a "nonprofit organization" but the FCC denied the request noting that the licensee, not the station itself, was responsible for the fines.
