= Postmodern brand =

In response to shifts in consumer behavior and conditions brought on by postmodernism, many companies changed their marketing approach to address and create more nimble, immersive experience and customer engagements. Postmodern branding are practices of personifying a brand based on a core set of traits. Postmodern branding behaviors understand and leverage technology, space, and mindset of the moment to create an enriched user experience. Brands have found new ways to enter the home and places in the consumers life. Successful branding within the postmodern society rely more on the developments of brand personality.

== Description ==
Traditional brand management has grown increasingly hard and complex within the postmodern marketplace. A brand in its modernist or traditional interpretation by marketing schools of thought and accredited, professional associations is defined as a, "name, term, design, symbol or any other feature that identifies one seller's good or services as distinct from those of other sellers. This definition, argued by Muzellec and McDonagh refers to the brand as a single reality or focus on only one-way addressable interaction partners that in many way are not current with customer communications.

As a result, many companies have changed the way they manage brand names, terms, designs, symbols and other marketing material on behalf of the brand. The significance here is not only focusing on and tracking the organizational created material, but also identifying, monitoring and tracking the material created or suggested by the enthusiast, loyalist, defectors and the like.

Newly developed systems require brands to be more nimble and personal in their interactions with customers. Although this is an ever-evolving period, it has introduced new rules for the "new now" or "new new now" of marketing. Regardless of the platforms and processes an organization employs, the brand manager should recognize that the brand they manage remains a participant in the community they seek to create. The organization should also recognize that it may not own the very brand it created.

== Behaviors ==
As of 2008, brands are becoming more important. Based on the evolution of the media ecosystem—with the developments of Twitter, Facebook, mobile codes and video—a marketer can see that the brand "exists beyond the ads and the products". As a result, brands have found new ways to enter the home and places in the consumers life. This newly developed entryway and space usually takes the form of branded content, branded entertainment, branded utilities, and most importantly brand personification (which occurs when the brand is treated and engaged with as one would engage with a physical person (i.e., make appointments with, talk to, touching, etc.).

Watching scheduled TV programs, utilizing and interacting with voice recognition services like Siri (behaviors predominantly found in the daily life of the postmodern consumer) are examples of how branded content and utilities are becoming more predominate within our current culture. Although some examples are eroding away, like scheduled TV viewing (according to JD Power and Associates roughly 45% of cable TV service customer have a DVR subscription, which is up from 38% in 2010), others are introduces with remarkable interfaces and user engagement protocols.

Successful branding within the postmodern society rely more on the developments of brand personality. Developing brand personality sets the stage in identifying deeper meaning around "How it, the brand, works". The formation of studying and defining a brand in this manner hinges on the trait theory of psychology. According to this theory, inherent traits (habitual patterns, thoughts and emotions) are perceived to remain relatively stable over time. Holding inherent traits constant while manipulating environmental cues and situational stimuli, natural personalities emerge. When applied to marketing, this process is called a brand-trait observational research study. By performing such studies a brand is able to extract "marketable" personalities; thus creating "livable brand personas".

== Influential postmodern brands ==
=== Coke ===
Coke is one of the more influential brands within the carbonated beverage industries. Although they have experienced an ongoing soda war with Pepsi dating back to the 1960s, they have emerged recently with an approach, Wendy White implies as agnostic and focused on telling engaging stories no matter where the consumer is. Additionally, this approach allows the user to take part in the brand, identify with the story being told and engage in the way he or she feels fit.

As a result of the approach the brand has seen great success in capturing the number two beverage position in terms of units sold while defending their legacy position as number one.

=== Starbucks ===
Although Starbucks has had minor setbacks in navigating the "new now", postmodern marketing landscape (53% drop in profits in 2009), they are still seen to be a leader in the space. At the current writing of this document, the brand has over 25M likes on Facebook with 279 people talking about their brand online.

Additionally the brand has also ushered in a sea of change by creating one of the most intuitive and innovative mobile apps in the market. In partnership with mFoundry, Starbucks created a mobile payment application that is in current use nationwide and within the first two months of the application being live over 3M customers downloaded and used it.

If these two examples are not enough to illustrate the brands commitment to the postmodern model of consumer engagement the use and execution of the branded social network, "MyStarbucksIdea.com" does. MyStarbucksIdea is a perfect example of giving up control of the brand to consumers. The social network allows consumers and loyalists to suggest ideas based on their personal experience with the company. Based on these suggest and the recommendations for the community Starbucks is able to more efficiently plan strategic roadmaps around consumer interactions. To date the brand has received over 120k ideas ranging from ordering, atmosphere, coffee and drinks to new technology.
