= Source Radio =

Coventry, England; England
- Broadcast area: Coventry University

Programming
- Format: CHR

Ownership
- Owner: Coventry University Students' Union; (Coventry University Students' Union)

History
- First air date: 2000–2019
- Former call signs: Phoenix Radio, Source FM

Links
- Webcast: http://mixlr.com/source-radio/

Source Radio was a radio station operating from Coventry, England. It was a division of the Coventry University Students' Union, and broadcast to the Campus and beyond, online. It occasionally operated for short periods on FM and AM, complemented by a near CD-quality version of the output via the Internet.

Known as "Source FM" from 2001 to 2005, and "Phoenix Radio" before that. The station has since rebranded back to Phoenix Radio.

== History ==
The station launched to the city on 1431AM on Monday, 5 March 2007 under the management of Kat Page, with a special programme presented live from the Students' Union nightclub, FiftyFour.

The AM launch coincided with the launch of 3G Smart Phones which could stream radio via apps such as TuneIn. This provided a means of listening on the move in a far better quality than AM. The young target audience are generally also quite "AM-resistant" and as a result, the 1431AM service never reached a particularly sizeable audience. The decision was taken to discontinue the AM service in 2009.

During the 2000s, Students Unions across the country participated in a national event called "Flirt!", a franchise for an evening entertainment event. CUSU became the first union in the country to have its radio station simulcast the event live on its radio station throughout the 2004–05 academic year.

== Phoenix Radio CU ==
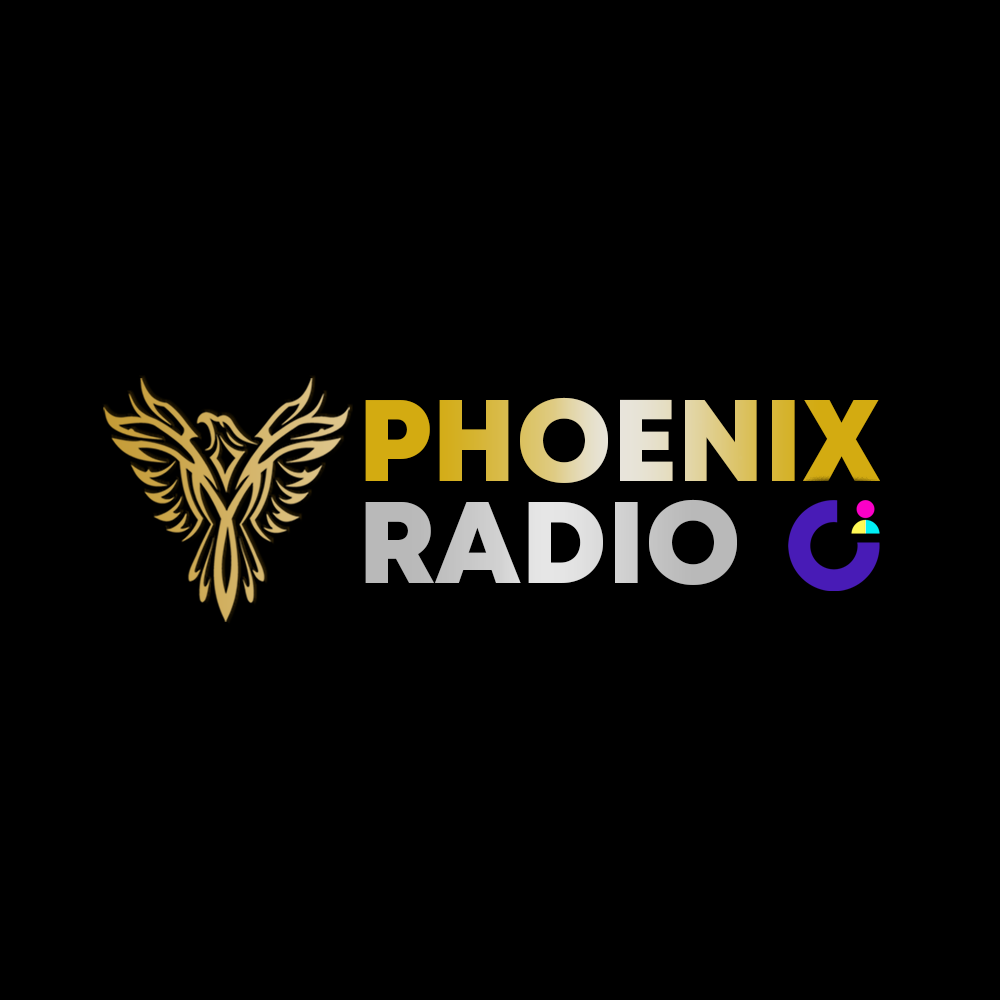
Phoenix Radio CU logo and title screen as of 2022

In 2019, Coventry University launched a new station under the name Phoenix Radio CUSU, with the name being changed to Phoenix Radio CU in September 2022. This station is run by students from Coventry University.

In 2022, Phoenix Radio CU joined Mixcloud so listeners can re-listen to shows that were live. The shows are released on Mixcloud after the shows are aired. Phoenix Radio CU featured on 14 Gloval Mixcloud Charts.

Awards

In April 2022, Phoenix Radio CU won Bronze for "The Amplify Awards Best Fundraising Initiative" for the fundraiser they created in November 2021, a week of fundraising in aid of BBC's Children in Need. From Monday 15th November to Friday 19th November 2021, presenters on Phoenix Radio CU came together to do special shows and challenges for Children in Need.In late 2022, Phoenix Radio CU was nominated for two awards at "The Student Radio Awards" Best Journalistic Programming and Best Station Sound. In early 2023, Phoenix Radio CU was nominated for five Amplify Awards, the most nominations ever for one event. On 4th April 2023, Phoenix Radio Won The Amplify Silver Award for Best Contribution to The Region for Phoenix Radio Unplugged.
