= One-third hypothesis =

The one-third hypothesis (OTH) is a sociodynamic theory asserting that a subgroup's prominence increases as it approaches one-third of the total population and diminishes after it exceeds that number. It was first stated by sociologist Hugo O. Engelmann in a letter to the American Sociologist in 1967:

"...we would expect that the most persistent subgroups in any group would be those which approximate one-third or, by similar reasoning, a multiple of [i.e., a power of] one-third of the total group. Being the most persistent, these groups also should be the ones most significantly implicated in ongoing sociocultural transformation. This does not mean that these groups need to be dominant, but they play prominent roles."

The OTH involves two mathematical curves. One represents the likelihood that a subgroup of a specific size will emerge. The other represents the probability that it will persist. The product of these two curves matches the prediction of the one-third hypothesis.

== Statistical formalization ==
Statistically speaking, the group that is one-third of the population is the one most likely to persist and the group that is two-thirds the one most likely to dissolve into splinter groups, as if reacting to the cohesiveness of the group that is one-third.

According to the binomial coefficient a group of size r occurs in a population of size n in $\tbinom nr$ ways. Because each group of size r can dissolve in 2^{r} subgroups, the total number of ways all groups of size r can emerge and dissolve equals 3^{n}, in keeping with the summation:

$(1+x)^n = \sum_{r=0}^\infty {n \choose r} x^r. \qquad$

Said otherwise, large groups close to two-thirds of the population will be more likely than any other groups to dissolve into splinter groups. A corollary of this consideration is that much smaller groups will be the ones most likely to emerge and to persist.

If groups of size r occur with a probability of $\tbinom n r p^r q^{n-r} \!$ and dissolve into subgroups with a probability of $q^{r} \!$, then the equation reduces to $\tbinom n r p^r q^n \!$ and given that p and q are each equal to 1/2, Engelmann's One-Third Hypothesis can be readily deduced. It takes the form of

$\tbinom n r / 2^{n+r} \!$,

where n is the number of people and r is the size of a group and can be verified for large numbers by using the Stirling's approximation formula.

== Early research and recent prediction ==
A perfect example of the OTH was illustrated by Wayne Youngquist’s 1968 “Wooden Shoes and the One-Third Hypothesis,” which documented the German population in Milwaukee little more than a century ago. As Germans approached one-third of city’s population they became more and more prominent. As they exceeded that level their importance began to abate.

The first empirical test of Engelmann’s OTH came in the form of the 1967 Detroit riot. It did not explain the cause of the riots but was aimed at explaining their timing.

Sam Butler, in 2011, explicitly cited Engelmann and the One-Third Hypothesis in his analysis of London's riots and their aetiology.

The idea is discussed in Malcom Gladwell's Revenge of the Tipping Point.

== Criticism ==
The OTH was never without its critics. Early on K. S. Srikantan correctly questioned the assumption that p and q are each equal to ½. Even if they are not, however, so long as p + q = 1, the maximum value of r will occur at pn/(1+p). The group most likely to emerge and persist will always be smaller than half of the population.

In social dynamics the OTH is sometimes referred to as critical mass. The terminology, though appropriate, has become ambiguous because “critical mass” is used in a variety of ways that do not suggest the OTH at all. Similarly, the OTH is sometimes called the two-thirds theory.

== See also ==
- Interaction frequency
- Urban riots
