= BRfm =

Coordinates: 51°47′42″N 3°10′38″W

BRFM
- Nantyglo; Wales
- Broadcast area: Brynmawr, Ebbw Vale, Nantyglo and surrounding areas
- Frequencies: 97.3 MHz, Online

Programming
- Languages: English, Welsh
- Format: Community: music and talk

Ownership
- Owner: BRfm Ltd
- Sister stations: BRFM TV

History
- First air date: 18 October 2007
- Last air date: December 2017

BRFM was a community radio station serving Brynmawr, Ebbw Vale, Nantyglo and surrounding areas of Blaenau Gwent in south Wales. The station used to broadcast locally on 97.3 FM and online via the station's website.

BRfm (the station's initials stand for Best Radio for Miles) was established in 2004 by Brynmawr's mayor, Robert Ball. Initially the station broadcast in one month periods, due to licence restrictions. In 2007 they were granted a five year radio broadcast licence by Ofcom.

Programming included local features and specialist music shows, weekly Welsh language programmes, regular sports coverage, and national news bulletins from Sky News Radio in London.

In 2017 Ofcom launched an investigation into BRFM, after radio host Dai Haywood made comments that Ofcom considered derogatory to LGBT people on air. Ofcom found that the comments presented a "negative and stereotyped view on the sexual behaviour of homosexual and bisexual people". BRFM permanently suspended Mr Haywood, and apologised for the remarks.

Later that same year it was highlighted that BRFM Limited had debts owing in the region of £90,000 and was closed down.

In August 2017, Stephen G Bower founded BGfm Limited with the slogan "Blaenau Gwent For Music" he successfully asked Ofcom for the 97.3fm frequency. It is now known as Blaenau Gwent Community Radio by the local community it serves BGfm is going from strength to strength.
