= 1991 Handsworth riots =

1991 riots in Birmingham, England

The third Handsworth riot occurred on 2 September 1991 in Handsworth, an inner-city area of Birmingham, when a power cut plunged the area into darkness and sparked a looting spree in local shops. 200 police officers in riot gear were called in to bring the unrest under control. Hundreds of shops and houses were looted and cars were stolen. This occurred around the same time as rioting in Oxford, Dudley, Tyneside and Cardiff.

This was the third time in a decade that Handsworth had been the scene of major rioting, following a riot in 1981 and the worst wave of rioting in 1985, in which two people were killed. A fourth riot took place 14 years later.

== See also ==
- 1981 Handsworth riots
- 1985 Handsworth riots
- 2005 Birmingham riots
