= KDAP-FM =

- Douglas, Arizona; United States
- Broadcast area: Southeast Cochise County Arizona and Northern Sonora Mexico
- Frequency: 96.5 MHz

Programming
- Format: Country

Ownership
- Owner: Redrock Media Group, LLC

History
- First air date: March 1, 1990
- Call sign meaning: Douglas/Agua Prieta

Technical information
- Licensing authority: FCC
- Facility ID: 33761
- Class: A
- ERP: 3,000 watts
- HAAT: 9 meters (30 feet)
- Transmitter coordinates: 31°21′18″N 109°33′06″W

Links
- Public license information: Public file; LMS

KDAP-FM (96.5 FM) is a radio station licensed to serve Douglas, Arizona, United States, and parts of northern Sonora, Mexico. The station is owned by Redrock Media Group, LLC. It airs a country music format as well as coverage of local community events.

== History ==
KDAP first went on the air March 9, 1990. It was the sister station of KDAP AM (1450 kHz). This station was the second FM station and the fourth total radio station in the Douglas, AZ/Sulphur Springs Valley area. KDAP's studio and transmitter are located approximately 2 miles from the U.S./ Mexico border. This station has good signal strength both in the United States and in Mexico. The call letters stand for Douglas/Agua Prieta, the towns on both sides of the border.

KDAP-FM's sister station KDAP AM was sold in April 2015 to Alex Goodman who will continue to operate the AM station from their shared studios and transmitter site.The Federal Communications Commission cancelled KDAP's license on October 4, 2021, due to the station failing to file an application to renew its license.

In 2012, KAPR AM in Douglas became the AM sister to KDAP-FM, when then-owner Howard Henderson acquired KAPR from Good Music, Inc.

In November 2015, Henderson died following a short illness. His wife Donna took over the ownership. In May 2024, the station, along with AM sister KAPR was sold to Redrock Media Group LLC, which also owns KCNN in Benson, AZ. This sale closed in October of 2024.

== Ownership ==
Arizona MultiBank Community Development Corporation, in conjunction with the PPEP Micro-business and Housing Development Corporation in Tucson, provided funding for the purchase of both KDAP and KDAP-FM by Douglas Broadcasting, Inc. (Howard N. Henderson).
