= Jane Gazzo's Dream Ticket =

Jane Gazzo in-studio, 29 September 2005

Jane Gazzo's Dream Ticket was a music radio show on BBC Radio 6 Music, presented by Jane Gazzo from 5 July 2004 to 29 September 2005.

It operates on the premise of making a Dream Ticket or Ultimate Gig requested by its listeners, and carefully chosen and drawn by the producer and staff from the BBC music session and live performance archives. One evening's radio show is made up of several of these Ultimate Gigs, contributed by different listeners.

An Ultimate Gig is a listener-selected collection of musical artists (though, in general theory, not necessarily restricted to musical artists), and blended from different performances into one virtual concert performance.

Some archival music chosen also includes unique classic sessions done for BBC's John Peel, a pioneer in getting new and alternative music recorded and aired.

Ultimate Gig submitters are usually interviewed on-air, so that they may share their thoughts and reasons for choosing their particular virtual musical admixture.

In addition, there are other musical themes and sub-themes running in parallel on the show. These intertwined themes may variously include a Headline Set, Classic Session, and a Disc From Down Under. Sundry live reports are filed from journalists and correspondents at the best of the evening's concerts in and about England and elsewhere world-wide. Sometimes, actual radio show listeners report on concerts. New and to-be-released current music of popular and alternative interest is also played and intertwined.

Jane Gazzo in-studio, with Kate Lawrence, 4 August 2005

As is one super-theme of BBC 6 Music generally, there is strong listener (user) interaction with the show, in vivo. Text messages, emails, and telephone calls affect certain non-Ultimate Gig musical themes and musical selections. One way this is done on the show is with listeners emailing in or text messaging in their votes with one word of an appropriately named antonymical word pair, usually with an explanation. One word recommends stopping the currently playing music, another recommends continuing more of it. Examples are tragic (stop) or magic (continue), sound or silence, and fan or can. The music voted upon, if decided dynamically by the listeners not to be continued, is usually gracefully brought to a reasonable end.

Another aspect of this show is something called webcam words which comprise a webcam message. This particular instantiation and expression webcam words may have been invented by this radio show, although live in-studio webcams are becoming ubiquitous in the radio broadcasting industry.

Webcam words refer to several paper signs in different locations in the live broadcast studio, each appearing on a different webcam, each containing a word, which make up a challenging and subtle related train of thought. It might be topical or musical or both. In some sense, it is semiotically driven in a classical fashion. Listeners are, in an artistic sense, entertained by the possible twists of phrase. Often, listeners compose clever complementary wordings around the webcam words and send them into the show, which are frequently read. Quite regularly, the webcam message is related to a musical theme on that particular evening's show.

Innovations with this show include the interplay of several new technological forces being applied to radio, visual interaction in the otherwise exclusively aural arena of radio, the listener being able to change the direction of the show in vivo, and the simple powerful concept of a virtual performance (Ultimate Gig or Dream Ticket).

Another challenging thematic innovation of the show is the blending and balancing of current popular music, classic session and performance music from the BBC archives, and new and possibly heretofore unheard alternative music.

== Critical Reviews ==
In the 2005 article, "ANALYSIS: RADIO: Lend them your ears" by Ian Burrell, The Independent, (London), 23 May 2005, the show is mentioned along with a characterisation of BBC 6 Music:

"BBC 6 MUSIC Audience: 311,000 Expect: New Order, Blur, British Sea Power A great station for the music cognoscenti, it has the feel of an indie record shop where they know every record ever made, who produced it, who played on it, what label it was on and who designed the sleeve. That’s maybe why some women say it’s ‘too blokey’. Star DJs include Steve Lamacq and Bruce Dickinson. Liz Kershaw and Jane Gazzo try to correct any imbalance. The best thing is Dream Ticket, where you imagine you’re at some of the greatest gigs ever …"

== See also ==
- Jane Gazzo
- Dream Ticket
- BBC Radio 6 Music
- BBC
