= Splinternet =

Characterization of the Internet as splintering and dividing

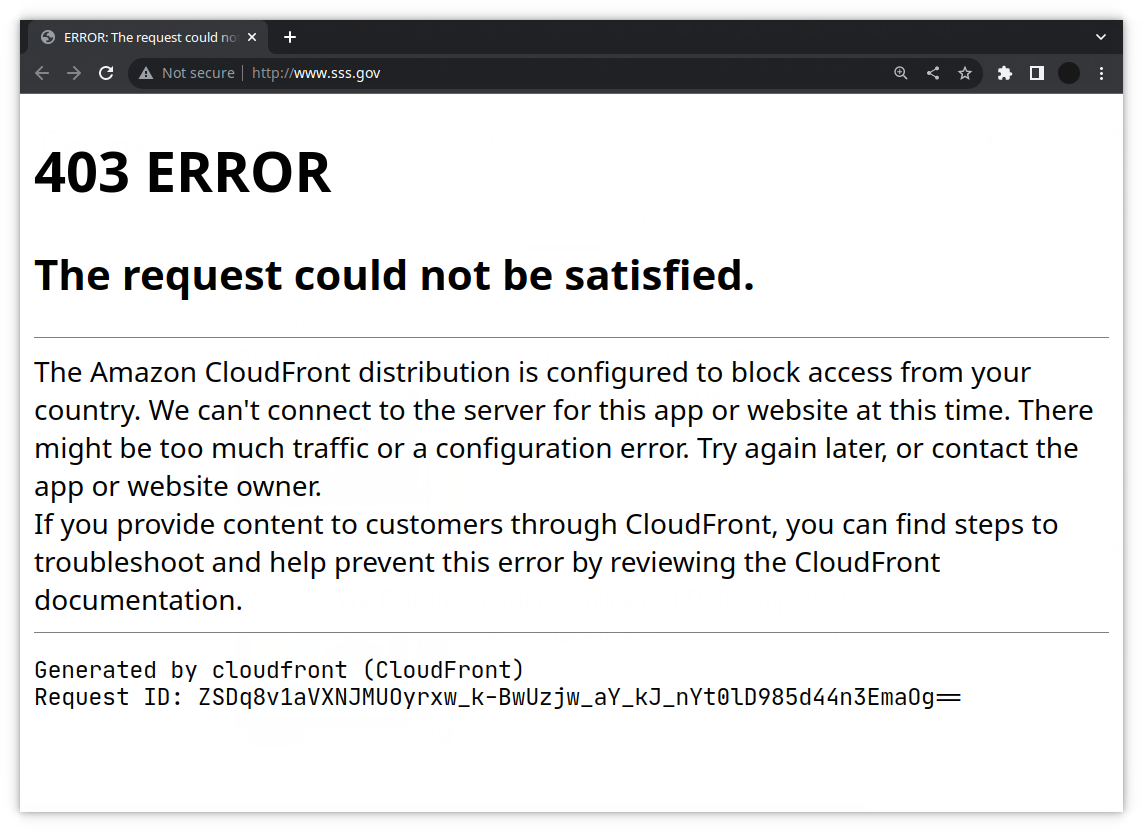
HTTP 403 Forbidden server response to a geo-blocked website https://sss.gov (Selective Service System) accessed from a Russian internet provider.

The splinternet (also referred to as cyber-balkanization or internet balkanization) is a characterization of the Internet as splintering and dividing due to various factors, such as technology, commerce, politics, nationalism, religion, and divergent national interests. "Powerful forces are threatening to balkanise it", wrote The Economist weekly in 2010, arguing it could soon splinter along geographic and commercial boundaries. The Chinese government erected the "Great Firewall" for political reasons, and Russia has enacted the Sovereign Internet Law that allows it to partition itself from the rest of the Internet. Other nations, such as the US and Australia, have discussed plans to create a similar firewall to block child pornography or weapon-making instructions.

Clyde Wayne Crews, a researcher at the Cato Institute, first used the term in 2001 to describe his concept of "parallel Internets that would be run as distinct, private, and autonomous universes." The concept itself dates back at least to pair of articles in the journal Science and at the International Conference on Information Systems by Marshall van Alstyne and Erik Brynjolfsson in 1996 and 1997. They argued that it the Internet and related technologies "have the potential to fragment interaction and divide groups by leading people to spend more time on special interests and by screening out less preferred contact." They dubbed this effect "cyberbalkanization" and developed a set of formal measures.

Crews used the term in a positive sense, but more recent writers, like Scott Malcomson, a fellow in New America's International Security program, use the term pejoratively to describe a growing threat to the internet's status as a globe-spanning network of networks.

== Technology ==
Describing the splintering of Internet technology, some writers see the problem in terms of new devices using different standards. Users no longer require web browsers to access the Web, as new hardware tools often come with their own "unique set of standards" for displaying information.

Journalist and author Doc Searls uses the term "splinternet" to describe the "growing distance between the ideals of the Internet and the realities of dysfunctional nationalisms...", which contribute to the various, and sometimes incompatible standards which often make it hard for search engines to use the data. He notes that "it all works because the Web is standardized. Google works because the Web is standardized". However, as new devices incorporate their own ad networks, formats, and technology, many are able to "hide content" from search engines".

Others, including information manager Stephen Lewis, describe the causes primarily in terms of the technology "infrastructure", leading to a "conundrum" whereby the Internet could eventually be carved up into numerous geopolitical entities and borders, much as the physical world is today.

On 19 July 2024, when the whole world was hugely affected by the 2024 global IT outage, China avoided a bad tech meltdown, according to BBC News, because China did not rely on foreign systems, and replaced foreign cloud providers with domestic ones such as Alibaba, Tencent and Huawei. With the parallel network, which is a great illustration of splinternet, China “managed to escape largely unscathed.”

== Commercial lock-in ==
The Atlantic magazine speculates that many of the new "gadgets have a 'hidden agenda' to hold you in their ecosystem". Writer Derek Thomson explains that

in the Splinternet age, ads are more tightly controlled by platform. My old BlackBerry defaulted to Bing search because (network operator) Verizon has a deal with Microsoft. But my new phone that runs Google Android software serves Google ads under apps for programs like Pandora.

They rationalize the new standards as possibly a result of companies wishing to increase their revenue through targeted advertising to their own proprietary user base. They add,

"This is a new age, where gadgets [corporations behind them] have a 'hidden agenda' to hold you in their ecosystem of content display and advertising. There are walls going up just as the walls to mobile Internet access are falling down".

Forrester Research vice president and author Josh Bernoff also writes that "the unified Web is turning into a Splinternet", as users of new devices risk leaving one Internet standard. He uses the term "splinternet" to refer to "a web in which content on devices other than PCs, or hidden behind passwords, makes it harder for site developers and marketers to create a unified experience". He points out, for example, that web pages "don't look the same because of the screen size and don't work the same since the iPhone doesn't support Flash". He adds that now, with the explosion of other phone platforms like Google Android, "we'll have yet another incompatible set of devices". However, both Android and iOS are Unix-like platforms, and both offer WebKit-based browsers as standard, as does handset manufacturer Nokia.

== Politics and nationalism ==
A survey conducted in 2007 by a number of large universities, including Harvard, found that Iran, China, and Saudi Arabia filter a wide range of topics, and also block a large amount of content related to those topics. South Korea filters and censors news agencies belonging to North Korea.

The survey found that numerous countries engaged in "substantial politically motivated filtering", including Burma, China, Iran, Syria, Tunisia, and Vietnam. Saudi Arabia, Iran, Tunisia, and Yemen engage in substantial social content filtering, and Burma, China, Iran, Pakistan and South Korea have the most encompassing national security filtering, targeting the websites related to border disputes, separatists, and extremists.

Foreign Policy writer Evgeny Morozov questions whether "the Internet brings us closer together", and despite its early ideals that it would "increase understanding, foster tolerance, and ultimately promote worldwide peace", the opposite may be happening. There are more attempts to keep foreign nationals off certain Web properties; for example, digital content available to U.K. citizens via the BBC's iPlayer is "increasingly unavailable to Germans". Norwegians can access 50,000 copyrighted books online for free, but one must be in Norway to do so. As a result, many governments are actively blocking Internet access to its own nationals, creating more of what Morozov calls a "Splinternet":

Google, Twitter, Facebook—are U.S. companies that other governments increasingly fear as political agents. Chinese, Cuban, Iranian, and even Turkish politicians are already talking up "information sovereignty" a euphemism for replacing services provided by Western Internet companies with their own more limited but somewhat easier to control products, further splintering the World Wide Web into numerous national Internets. The age of the Splinternet beckons.

Organizations such as the OpenNet Initiative were created because they recognized that "Internet censorship and surveillance are growing global phenomena." Their book on the subject was reportedly "censored by the U.N." with a poster removed by U.N. security officials because it mentioned China's "Great Firewall". In March 2010, Google chose to pull its search engines and other services out of China in protest of their censorship and the hacking of Gmail accounts belonging to Chinese activists.

Other countries, besides China, also censor Internet services: Reporters Without Borders ranks Iran's press situation, for example, as "Very serious", the worst ranking on their five-point scale. Iran's Internet censorship policy is labeled "Pervasive" by the OpenNet Initiative's global Internet filtering map, and the worst in the ranking. In March 2010, they added Turkey and Russia to their 'under surveillance' list regarding Internet censorship, and warned other countries, such as the United Arab Emirates, Belarus and Thailand, also "under surveillance" status, to avoid getting transferred into the next "Enemies of the Internet" list.

== Security and espionage ==
In May 2013, former United States CIA and NSA employee Edward Snowden provided The Guardian with documents revealing the existence of far-reaching espionage systems installed by the NSA at critical junctions where Internet traffic is aggregated. As various world governments have learned the extent to which their own communications have been compromised, concerns have been raised that these governments will erect independent networks so as to isolate their traffic from NSA spying programs.

In October 2013, Brazilian President Dilma Rousseff announced plans to create a "walled-off, national Intranet".

== Interests ==
Splintering of the Internet community can occur when people engage in confirmation bias and create echo chambers, using the Internet to exclude or avoid views that contradict their beliefs and attitudes. Called Cyberbalkanization (or sometimes cyber-balkanization), it refers to the division of the Internet or the World Wide Web into sub-groups with specific interests (digital tribes), where the sub-group's members almost always use the Internet or the web to communicate or read material that is only of interest to the rest of the sub-group. The term may have first been used in an MIT paper by Marshall Van Alstyne and Erik Brynjolfsson that was published online in March 1997. The concept was also discussed in a related November 1996 article in the journal Science and in a Spring 1997 law review article. The term is a hybrid of cyber, relating to the Internet, and Balkanization, a phenomenon that takes its name from the Balkans, a part of Europe that was historically subdivided by languages, religions and cultures.

In his 2001 book Republic.com, Cass Sunstein argued that cyberbalkanization could damage democracy, because it allows different groups to avoid exposure to one another as they gather in increasingly segregated communities, making recognition of other points of view or common ground decreasingly likely. The commentator Aleks Krotoski feels that Jihadist groups often use the Internet in this way.

Despite the concerns of cyberbalkanization, there is mixed evidence that it is actually growing. One Wharton study found that internet filters can create commonality, not fragmentation. However, this study primarily focused on music recommendation algorithms, and openly states that more research is required surrounding other domains (e.g. news, books, fashion). Another study found that ideological segregation of online news consumption is low in absolute terms, higher than the segregation of most offline news consumption, and significantly lower than the segregation of face-to-face interactions with neighbors, co-workers, or family members. The study notes that an important caveat, however, is that none of their evidence speaks to the way people translate the content they encounter into beliefs, which may be a larger factor in the problem these types of studies seek to address.

== See also ==
- Alt-tech
- Epistemic closure
- Filter bubble
- Interaction frequency
- Internet slang
- Internet censorship
- Darknet
- Cuius regio, eius religio
- Network sovereignty
- Protecting Americans from Foreign Adversary Controlled Applications Act
- Vendor lock-in
- National intranet
