= Lowell, Arizona =

- Populated place
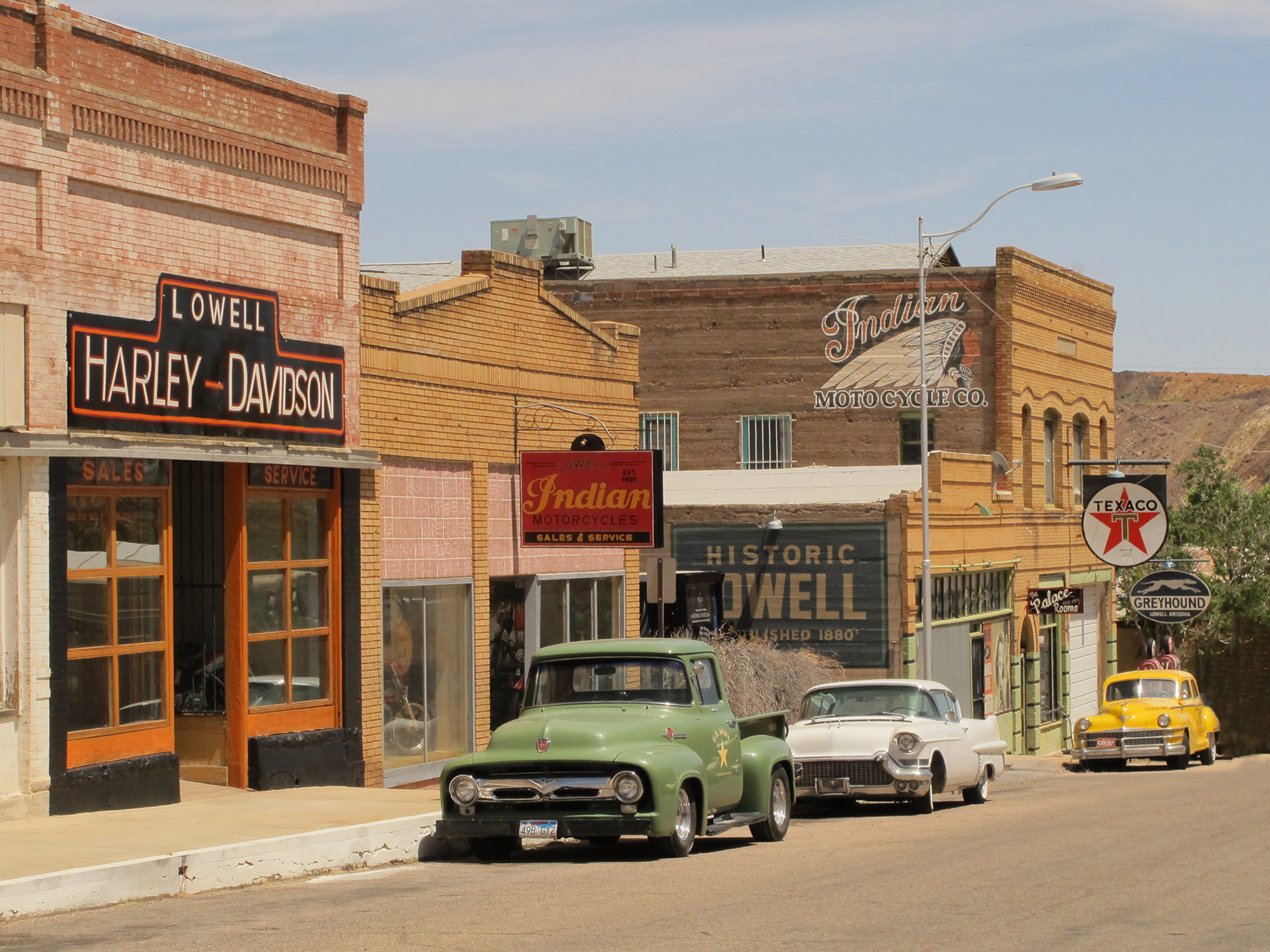
- Downtown Lowell

- Location within the state of Arizona Lowell (the United States)
- Coordinates: 31°25′40″N 109°53′37″W
- Country: United States
- State: Arizona
- County: Cochise
- Elevation: 5,076 ft (1,547 m)
- Time zone: UTC-7 (Mountain (MST))
  - Summer (DST): UTC-7 (MST)
- Area code: 520
- FIPS code: 04-42310
- GNIS feature ID: 7442

Lowell is a populated place situated in Cochise County, Arizona, United States. It was incorporated into Bisbee in the early 1900s.

Originally a residential town, it was later settled by many miners from countries such as Finland, Serbia and Montenegro working in the Lavender Pit mine located there.
