= 1985 Handsworth riots =

1985 riots in Birmingham, England

1985 Handsworth riot
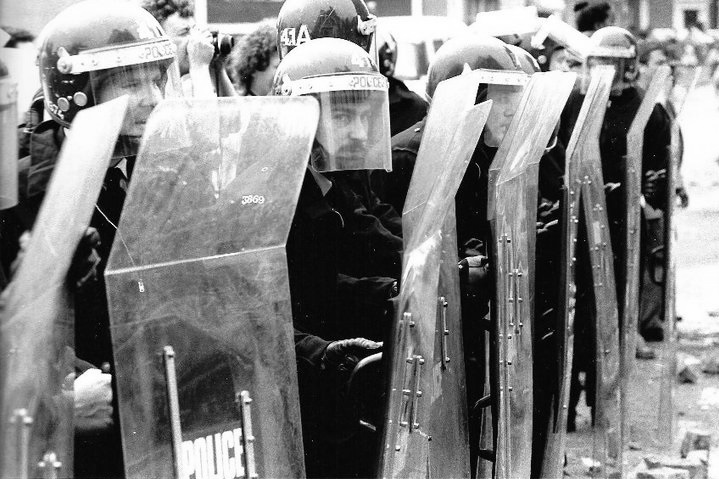
- West Midlands Police officers equipped with riot gear in Handsworth during the civil disorder in 1985
- Date: 9-11 September 1985
- Location: Handsworth, Birmingham, England
- Methods: Rioting, looting, arson

Casualties and losses
- 2 deaths 2 people unaccounted for 35 injured

The second Handsworth riots took place in the Handsworth district of Birmingham, West Midlands, from 9 to 11 September 1985. The riots were reportedly sparked by the arrest of a man near the Acapulco Cafe, Lozells, and a police raid on the Villa Cross public house in the same area. Hundreds of people attacked police and property, looting and smashing, even setting off fire bombs.

Handsworth had been the scene of a less serious riot four years earlier, when a wave of rioting hit more than thirty other British towns and cities during the spring and summer of 1981.

Racial tension and friction between the police and the local ethnic minority communities was seen as a major factor in the riots. Handsworth had been predominantly populated by black and Asian communities for around thirty years by 1985. Handsworth also had one of the highest unemployment rates in Birmingham.

Two brothers (Kassamali Moledina, 38, and 44-year-old Amirali) were burnt to death in the post office that they ran. Two other people were unaccounted for, 35 others were injured, more than 1,500 police officers were drafted into the area, about 45 shops were looted and burnt, and there was a trail of damage running into hundreds of thousands of pounds. As well as racial tension, unemployment was seen as a major factor in the riots; fewer than 5% of black pupils to have left school in the summer preceding the riot had found employment.

The riots were the subject of John Akomfrah's award-winning documentary film Handsworth Songs. Filmmaker and artist Pogus Caesar extensively documented the riots; his photographs have been exhibited at ICA, London, TATE Britain, Bristol Museum & Art Gallery, and the National Gallery of Art, Washington, USA. They were depicted in reggae artist Pato Banton's song Handsworth Riots, and they were witnessed by Goldie and Bronx graffiti artists Brim, who documented the devastation in the documentary Bombin' (1987).

The riots were the first of a series of similar riots across the country during the autumn of 1985, notably including the Broadwater Farm riot in London, which also resulted in a fatality (the murder of policeman Keith Blakelock).

== See also ==
- Broadwater Farm riot
- 1985 Brixton riot
- 1981 Handsworth riots
- 1991 Handsworth riots
- 2005 Birmingham riots

== Sources ==
- Handsworth Songs, Black Audio Film Collective's 1986 film examining the roots of social disorder in Britain
- "Handsworth Riots 1985" – Pogus Caesar / OOM Gallery Archive/Artimage/DACS extensive collection of archive photographs taken during the 1985 Handsworth riots
- "Handsworth Riot" – a song by reggae singer Pato Banton depicting the events of the riots, with lyrics including first-person accounts from blacks and Asians
