= Harborough FM =

Radio station in the UK

- Market Harborough; England
- Broadcast area: South Leicestershire and North Northamptonshire
- Frequency: 102.3 MHz
- RDS: HFM

Programming
- Format: Community radio

Ownership
- Owner: HFM Radio Limited

History
- First air date: 10 February 2007

Links
- Website: HFM website

Harborough FM (HFM) is a community radio station in Market Harborough, Leicestershire, England. The station broadcasts to south Leicestershire and North Northamptonshire.

HFM was originally formed in November 1994. Between 1994 and 2004, the station carried out eleven successful broadcasts, the last one being in June 2004. These broadcasts were made under the Radio Authority's "Restricted Service Licence" scheme which allowed the station to broadcast for a maximum period of 28 days.

== Launch ==
On 15 June 2005 HFM were awarded a full-time licence by Ofcom to broadcast to Market Harborough and South Leicestershire 24 hours a day, 365 days a year.

The station launched on Saturday 10 February 2007 with a live broadcast from The Square in Market Harborough town centre. The station was launched by Eva Winston-Hart, a local child suffering from a rare form of leukaemia. The first official voice on the station was that of Chris Jones, Programme Controller, and the first record played was "Are You Ready for Love" by Elton John.

HFM's programming is music-based but also focuses on community news and events. There is a daily Community Update as well as local news on the hour between 08:00 and 18:00 on weekdays, with updates at the weekends. Outside of these times, the station utilises Independent Radio News.

== Presenters - Past and Present ==
- Pete Flower
- Paul Moore
- John Fitzpatrick
- Darren Coleman
- Karen Anderson
- Graham Beeby
- Richard Bransby
- Sam Britton
- Owen Brooks
- Phil Brookes
- Will Challenor
- Dave Charles
- djbraine
- Mark Evans
- Darren Harte
- Terry Hawke
- Dave Irving
- Chris Jones
- Jonno
- Tom Lathom
- Grant Lush
- Rob Maltman
- Soozie Max
- Moley
- Noony
- Richard Oliff
- Liz Osborne
- Dani Rust
- Steve Palmer
- Ian Parker
- Simon Parry
- Rory Rattray
- Stu Reeves
- Kendall Reeves-Sassoon
- Becca Robertson
- Gavin Samways
- Nick Shaw
- Nick Shelton
- Sean Smith
- Gordon Warren
- Nina Watkins
- Keith Williams
- Adam Wilson
- Paul Wright
- Rod Watts
- Dave Smith
- Pat Stones
- Paul Grunill
- Yvonne Benson
- Will Norton
- Steve Watts
- Phil Jesson
- Dave Edwards
- James Garner
- Logan Reeves-Sassoon
- Malcolm Noble
- Gavin Samways
- Ross Monro
- Dale Williams
- Stu Begley
- Adam Simmons
- Emma B
- Graham Wright
- Rockin' Ray
- Dorthe Hawke
- Colin J
- Paul Winsor
- Paul Hartshorn
- Tony Walters
- Dec Moran
- Erin Billington
- Martin Sanders
- Jim Gardner
- DJ Gavlar

== History ==
In August 2011 HFM was awarded an extension to their licence, which enabled it to continue broadcasting until 9 February 2017.

In August 2021 HFM's news coverage of the murder of Fleckney pensioner Jane Hings featured in an episode of Sky Crime documentary Killer in My Village.

In September 2026 HFM was awarded a further 10 year licence, which enabled it to continue broadcasting until 9 February 2037.

== See also ==
- List of radio stations in the United Kingdom
- Community radio

== §External links ==
- HFM Website
- Licence detail (CR013)
- Coverage Map
