= Phoenix Radio =

Phoenix Radio 96.7 FM
- Halifax; England
- Broadcast area: Calderdale
- Frequency: 96.7 MHz
- RDS: PHOENIX

Programming
- Format: Community-based

Ownership
- Owner: Phoenix Radio Limited

History
- First air date: 10 December 2007

Technical information
- Transmitter coordinates: 53.7276°N 1.8635°W

Links
- Website: www.phoenixfm.co.uk

Phoenix Radio 96.7 FM is a local radio station based in Halifax, in West Yorkshire, England. It broadcasts on FM and DAB+ frequencies, 24 hours a day to the Metropolitan Borough of Calderdale, and the surrounding areas and around the world online. It is owned and run by Phoenix Radio Ltd, which has also previously held six restricted service licences (RSLs) in the past. It was awarded its full-time licence by OFCOM, thus becoming, on 10 December 2007, Calderdale's first and only local radio station.

== History ==
Since its conception in 1998, Phoenix Radio 96.7 FM has had six broadcasts over the years on restricted service licences. Over that period of time of RSLs it had been broadcasting on two differing frequencies 106.2 FM and 107.2 FM.

In 2005, Phoenix Radio Limited was awarded a full-time license to broadcast on the 96.7 FM frequency, as a local radio station with a format that is community-based. Phoenix Radio is a member of the Community Radio Association whose code of practice is to take positive action to ensure that the needs of the listening audience is met through selective programme scheduling and by listening and acting on what the audience tells the station what they want from the local medium .

The station was launched at 7am on Monday 10 December 2007 and was officially opened by the Mayor of Calderdale.

In order to gain funding, initially phoenix radio gained funding from the Princes Trust, and other charities whilst providing an educational setting teaching radio production, interviewing and production techniques. These students worked towards Youth Achievement awards.

== Technical and broadcast ==
The studios are based in the Dean Clough complex in Halifax, Calderdale. The transmitter that Phoenix Radio 96.7 FM uses is on the roof of Calderdale College in Halifax, which has been used since September 2025.

The station broadcasts to Calderdale and the FM signal can be reached in the surrounding areas of Halifax, south Bradford, north Kirklees and south-western Leeds. They also stream the broadcasts via its website.

The station also broadcasts RDS text. The RDS name is PHOENIX.

In March 2026, the station started to broadcast on DAB+ via the small-scale Halifax DAB multiplex, which it shares with Sunrise Radio. This also transmits from the roof of Calderdale College.

== Programming ==
Programming on the station includes a wide variety of music genres from the 1950s to current chart and new music from local, national and international artists, studio-based chat involving the local community, interviews with local people, local organisations to politicians and well-known personalities, as well as highlighting issues which affect the local community such as housing, education, sport, disabilities and local recruitment.

Throughout the night Sunday/Monday to Friday/Saturday, hits from across the decades are played. However, on Saturday nights through to Sunday morning, specialist dance music programs are broadcast under Phoenix FM's dance music brand 'Phoenix FM Dance'. Presenters are Claire Hunter, Graeme Park, Rob Bray. Aaron Midgley and Mr Lieb also complete the line up. Previous presenters being local DJs and producer Marc Smith.

'Phoenix FM Dance' replaced the Specialist Dance show which was broadcast between 8pm until 10pm Saturday nights by Local Dj Marc Smith. In which local DJs were given the chance to play a DJ set on his show. This became tremendously popular, and soon led to local retailers offering products to give out free on air during their show. All Marc's shows were broadcast live, which led to some listeners trying to get Marc to give them fake shout outs (mentions on air) for novelty purposes, which gave the show more character and a touch of humour.

== Training ==
With support from the European Social Fund and the Learning and Skills Council, Phoenix Radio Ltd were able to set up a radio-based training scheme for young people aged 16–25, the Phoenix Radio Empower Project, offering the Youth Achievement Award. This was originally taught by local and national music producers Alan Hinton and Marc Smith.

Through this training Phoenix went from being an unknown quantity to gaining much support and interest both locally and nationally. Phoenix Radio then became recognised as the first in the country to develop CD-ROM based portfolios for the Youth Achievement Award.

The Phoenix Radio Empower Project was the result of a long-term plan to support the community of Calderdale, in particular the younger people, when the station was off-air (outside RSLs). The Phoenix Radio Empower Project was designed to bring together inclusion and empower young people. Phoenix Radio Limited is now contracted with Entry 2 Employment (e2e) to continue this programme.

Phoenix Radio also provides training for people in community groups who are not familiar with technical skills on radio equipment as well as developing their IT skills. The station aims to build bridges and bridge gaps throughout Calderdale.
