= Coventry University Students' Union =

Students' union for Coventry University

- Institution: Coventry University
- Location: The Hub, Coventry, England
- Established: 1960
- Affiliations: Advice Centre; Child Poverty Action Group (CPAG); National Association Student Money Advisors (NASMA); Advice Services Coventry (ASC); ADVICE UK; London Advice Service Alliance (LASA); United Kingdom Council International Students Affairs (UKCISA); National Association Citizens’ Advice Bureau (NACAB); UNIPOL Student Homes; Democracy NUS
- Website: Coventry University Students' Union website

Coventry University Students' Union, also known as CUSU and Your Students' Union, is the students' union for Coventry University, in Coventry, England.

The Students’ Union is situated in The Hub with other facilities for sports and societies and media in another building in Priory Street, both buildings are on the main university campus; the Hub is used for students to socialise or study and is located in the heart of the city centre. The Students’ Union was opened in the early 1960s and became a students' union that innovated in music performance, representation, campaigns and offering accredited academic programmes as part of its own services.

== History ==
The Students’ Union was founded in 1960 as part of the Lanchester College of Technology. There was a separate students union for the Coventry Art School which was probably active at the same time. The Lanchester College, Art School and Rugby College of Higher Education students unions were amalgamated on 1 January 1971 with the formation of the Lanchester Polytechnic. There were separate students union offices in the Art School, the Lanchester and Rugby sites but were part of a single governance. The Rugby site for the students union closed along with the closure of the Rugby site for the Polytechnic in 1980. The students union changed its name several times in line with the change of name of the parent institution (Lanchester Polytechnic, Coventry (Lanchester) Polytechnic, Coventry Lanchester Polytechnic and eventually Coventry Polytechnic). The Education Reform Act of 1989 changed the status of polytechnics to universities and by 1992 the students union was named Coventry University Students' Union (CUSU). The students Union obtained independent legal status as a registered charity and a limited company by guarantee in 2009. A trading company was also established at the same time for its commercial operations, CUSU Services Ltd.

== Governance and purpose ==
CUSU is a democratically elected and student led organisation with, by 2016/17, 6 sabbatical (full-time) student officers who are elected annually. All students who are enrolled on a course of Coventry University are entitled to vote in all student officer elections. The other parts of the University Group (Coventry University College, London Campus, etc.) may be approved by CUSU to be entitled to full membership of CUSU by resolution of the Trustee Board. The Trustee Board consists of elected student officers and lay trustees, who hold office for three years, and all collectively have legal responsibilities under Charity Law. The Board of Trustees is the employer of all CUSU staff of which there were 45+ in 2015.

The purpose and mission of the organisation are given in the Articles of Association (the constitution) which in brief are to support and advance the welfare, social and cultural interests and experience of all students; and to ensure that all students have opportunities to engage with and participate within the students union.

The students union had its first black president, Francis Evans, in 1971/2. The first Asian president, Manjit Singh, was in 1985. The first Asian woman president, Kelly Amin, was in 1987. The first disabled students officer, Deepak Shah, elected to the students union executive committee was elected in 1991. Since 2010 international students have been prominent and successful in elections within CUSU for both the executive committee (full-time officers) and the Student Council (the sovereign body of students). An award by UKCISA/NUS was given to CUSU for its work with international students in 2011.

== Coventry and music performance ==
Lanchester Polytechnic Students Union became well known as a venue in the city for music in both its Main Hall and in the basement bar of its Priory Street building from the mid 1960s onwards. This reputation grew considerably with the appointment of Ted Little, a mature student who had previously worked in the music business and knew many booking agents. From 1967 to 1970 Ted Little developed the Lanchester Arts Festival of music, film, poetry and theatre. The festivals normally lasted a week to ten days. Significant events in the festival were advertised in the national press (including festival supplements in the music press) and included: the first live performance of Monty Python at the Belgrade Theatre; Sir Adrian Boult conducting a symphony orchestra; Chuck Berry recorded live at Tiffany's of 'My Ding a Ling'; and the debut performance post-Cream of the Jack Bruce and Friends Band.

The students union continued to be a major national venue for rock music throughout the 1970s from the 'prog rock' of ELP in the early part of the decade to punk and post punk, "Coventry became a centre for the UK music scene," (Pete Chambers). Most importantly, the Two Tone Record Label was formed at the students union in 1979. Members of the founding bands of the Two Tone record label, The Specials and The Selecter, were students at the Lanchester Polytechnic, most importantly amongst these students was Jerry Dammers who had been an art student. Further information on the extensive list of bands and other cultural performances at the students union can be found at the Coventry Music Museum.

== Innovation in campaigning ==
Like other students unions, CUSU had been involved in occupations of administrative buildings during the 1970s. However, an innovation from 1980 onwards created at Coventry was the 'work in'. This was begun in the Library and the Art School and involved the control of buildings by the students without the disruption of the normal teaching and learning practices. This strategy was copied by other students unions.

In the 1980s the students union, with the support of Coventry City Council, created the Southern African Scholarship Fund. This Fund was unique in limiting scholarships to black women from South Africa during the time of apartheid. The then Polytechnic waived the tuition fees but the air fares and living costs were met by voluntary donations. From its inception in 1988 there were over 20 black women scholars; the scheme continued post-apartheid to support the development of the republic of South Africa and closed in 2005.

Every year CUSU runs a number of campaigns, each one having their own purpose. Some campaigns are principally run to raise awareness and others are set out to achieve specific objectives. Each of these campaigns are not only chosen by students but driven by them too. Successful campaigns Coventry University’s Student Union has done in the past include Black History Month, a Stop Smoking campaign and One World Week.

== Facilities and services ==
The Students’ Union currently offers a wide range of services and facilities for students.

The SU Advice Centre (SUAC) provides free, independent and confidential advice to all students, ranging from financial issues, housing, academic issues to disability rights. SUAC also supports welfare campaigns such as housing/tenants rights awareness, healthy eating and plagiarism awareness. The Volunteer and Employability department support students in securing volunteering placements in the local community. Students are able to browse through opportunities and sign up to gain skills they believe will enhance their career prospects. The department offers information about the placements students choose, and offer support and training to get students started with their volunteering. The Student’s Union also likes to support the local community; over 1500 students volunteer per year with local schools and community groups.

There are also many student-led activities which involve thousands of students. There were by 2015 over 100 societies for cultural, religious, academic interests. There are over 45 sports clubs which engage with competitions at local and national levels, including the British Universities & Colleges Sport (BUCS). Both societies and sports clubs have organised trips and tours overseas. Students are also involved in the production and editing of the student media which consists of the newspaper, radio and TV (YouTube channel).
