= Hot 92 (pirate radio station) =

Pirate radio station in Birmingham, England

Hot 92 is a pirate radio station in Birmingham, England, which in October 2005, along with another local pirate station and a black interest website, reported rumours that a black girl was raped by a group of Asian men. This allegedly caused riots in the Lozells area of Birmingham, leaving at least one person dead and 35 people injured.

In November 2005, Leon Williams, then 26, pleaded guilty to charges related to helping to run an illegal broadcasting station.

In January 2008, one of the people associated with the station, Ernest Uriah Griffiths, was convicted of two charges of unauthorised broadcasting.

By 2022, the website was shut down.

== See also ==
- 2005 Birmingham race riots
