= 2005 Birmingham riots =

2005 riots in Birmingham, England

- Date: 22–23 October 2005
- Location: Lozells and Handsworth, Birmingham, England
- Methods: Rioting

Casualties and losses
- 2 deaths

The Birmingham riots of 2005 occurred on two consecutive nights on Saturday 22 October and Sunday 23 October 2005 in the Lozells and Handsworth area of Birmingham, England. The riots were derived from ethnic tensions between the Caribbean and British Pakistani communities, with the spark for the riot being an alleged gang rape of a teenage black girl by a group of British Pakistani men. The rape allegation has never been substantiated. No evidence has been found to support the rumour nor has any victim come forward (further rumours asserted that this was because the victim was present in Britain unlawfully and feared deportation). The clashes involved groups of Caribbean and British Pakistani men committing serious acts of violence against various targets from both communities. The riots were connected to the deaths of two men, 23-year-old Isaiah Young-Sam and 18-year-old Aaron James.

== Background ==
The majority of the Asian population in the Lozells area are of Pakistani origin. The black population is predominantly of Caribbean origin. The animosity that preceded the rioting appears to have been largely based on local economic rivalry combined with possible agitation from opposing criminal gangs.

During a 2004 documentary titled Who You Callin' a Nigger? writer and broadcaster Darcus Howe picked up and commented upon a backdrop of mutual ethnic minority racism both in the West Midlands and the rest of Britain. His documentary did not focus solely on the differences between the Caribbean and British Asian community but also included tensions between the Caribbean community and recent African immigrants as well as inter-Asian racism. The problems specific to the Lozells area appear to be centered on the prevalence of Asian-owned businesses, the "unfair treatment" and "derogatory attitudes" of each community to the other.

== The alleged rape ==
There has never been agreement on the date the alleged rape occurred and the exact circumstances remain unclear: descriptions of the event change dependent on source. The earliest news items concerning the issue seem to begin with the BBC reporting a "Stop traffic" protest on 18 October 2005.

The rumours involved a 14-year-old girl of Jamaican heritage attempting to shoplift from a branch of "Beauty Queen Cosmetics". The girl was then raped by a group of eight to nineteen Pakistani origin men. Afraid of being deported due to her illegal immigrant status the girl supposedly refused to provide a statement to the police. The police appealed for any evidence of the event occurring and stated at the very least her immigrant status would not be an issue until after the allegations had been dealt with. Despite the appeal, forensic searches and questioning of several individuals, the allegations have never been substantiated and no witnesses have come forward, nor was the girl ever identified.

== Rumours and riot ==
Local pirate radio stations, most notably Hot 92 along with one of its DJs 'Warren G' discussed the details of the alleged rape and a picket was set up outside the premises of the shop in question. There were also calls for boycotts of other British Asian businesses. Ajaib Hussein, 33, the shop owner denied the event ever occurred and blamed business rivals for starting the rumour. A public meeting was held on Saturday 22 October at the New Testament Church of God. At around 17:45 the meeting ended and violence erupted outside. Gangs of men fought running battles and at 19:15, Isaiah Young-Sam, was fatally stabbed. Young-Sam had not been present at the meeting, or been involved in the running battles between gangs of youths, he had been at a cinema in the city centre with friends before being forced off his bus home due to it being diverted because of the public disorder. As he and his friends made their way on foot down a side street they were confronted by a group of Asian Youths who chased them down and stabbed Young-Sam. As the night progressed the police recorded 80 offences occurring. Rioting also occurred to a lesser extent during the night of 23 October. Between 30 and 50 individuals were thought to be involved in the most serious incidents.

Three men were convicted of Young-Sam's murder, but acquitted after a retrial. A man pleaded guilty to the manslaughter of Aaron James. In July 2007 six people were convicted of various offences related to the riots; four men were subsequently jailed in November 2007. In May 2008 four men were convicted for a being part of a mob that confronted and threatened a fire crew with firearms and machetes.

In the aftermath of the riots a solidarity march for unity was conducted by Caribbean, white and British Asian women and children. On 5 November 2005 graves in the Muslim part of a local cemetery were desecrated. Vandals who pushed over and destroyed several grave stones left behind leaflets insulting Muslims. The leaflets were signed by a group calling itself "Black Nation". There is no previous history of any such organisation and it is not known whether it does in fact exist. Dr John Sentamu, the first African archbishop in the Church of England, strongly condemned the desecrations.

== Media coverage ==
On 21 February 2006 the Press Complaints Commission censured The Voice, the leading black newspaper in Britain, for reporting the alleged rape in terms that suggested it was unchallenged fact (the newspaper had headlined "Gang of 19 rape teen"). The rumours were picked up by two Caribbean websites Blacknet and Supertrax which each allowed their chatrooms to post reactions from around the country. Supertrax reported that Lozells was swarming with "Paki gangs" with "sumtin to prove"; whilst Blacknet, a website promoted by The British Council, printed various contributions one of which was: "I hope Asian women are getting their throats cut as we speak", followed by a response: "Narrow it down to Pakistani women and I'll agree with you". After the riot, Blacknet apologised and removed what it called "absolutely disgusting" material posted on its site.

The riots were the subject of a retrospective BBC Radio 4 podcast, made in 2023.

== See also ==
- 1981 Handsworth riots
- 1985 Handsworth riots
- 1991 Handsworth riots
- Urban riots
