= 1981 Handsworth riots =

1981 riot in Birmingham, England

- Part of the 1981 England riots
- Date: 10–12 July 1981
- Location: Handsworth, Birmingham, England
- Methods: Rioting

Casualties and losses
- 40 police officers injured 121 arrests made

The 1981 Handsworth riots were three days of rioting that took place in the Handsworth area of Birmingham, England in July 1981. The major outbreak of violence took place on the night of Friday 10/11 July, with smaller disturbances on the following two nights.

The riots were characterised by the Scarman report into the 1981 riots in England as "copycat riots" – taking place after the Brixton riots in London, and around the same time as the Toxteth riots in Liverpool and the Moss Side riots in Manchester – though some have argued that this is an oversimplification. The immediate flashpoint was an attack on a locally well-known Police Superintendent who was trying to calm rumours of an impending march by the right-wing National Front. The following disturbances resulted in 121 arrests and 40 injuries to police officers, alongside widespread damage to property.

Before the riots Handsworth had been considered to be a good example of successful community policing, though local Black British youths later disputed the claim that relations between them and the police had been amicable: around 40% of them had been stopped and searched over the previous 12 months. Handsworth had a mixed population of white, black and Asian residents, but surveys after the riots showed little evidence of significant racial tension. A week before the riots, during the weekend that saw CS gas used against rioters for the first time on the British Mainland in Toxteth, Liverpool, a reporter from The Times had visited a festival in Handsworth Park and found "8,000 people, black and white" in "a spirit as amiable and peaceful as a rural village fete". The most common reasons for the riots reported by participants were unemployment, boredom and the imitation of events elsewhere.

== See also ==
- 1981 England riots
- 1985 Handsworth riots
- 1991 Handsworth riots
- 2005 Birmingham race riots
- 2011 UK riots
