= Dream Ticket =

Dream Ticket was a music radio show on BBC Radio 6 Music, and on the air since the opening of the radio station in 2002 until 2007.

The presenters have been Janice Long (11 March 2002 – 1 July 2004), Jane Gazzo (5 July 2004 – 29 September 2005 – see Jane Gazzo's Dream Ticket), Nemone (3 October 2005 – 10 August 2006). Clare McDonnell (interim period in September 2006), Joe Mace (September 2006 – January 2007), Shaun Keaveny (January 2007 – April 2007), George Lamb (2 April 2007 – 18 October 2007), Gideon Coe (22 October 2007).

The show played current music as well as music from the BBC music session and live performance archives, up to forty years in the past.

Some archival music chosen also included classic sessions done for BBC's John Peel, a pioneer in getting new and alternative music recorded and aired.

Sundry live reports were filed from journalists and correspondents at the best of the evening's concerts in and about England and elsewhere worldwide. Sometimes, actual radio show listeners have reported on concerts.

One featured segment of the show was The Headline Set wherein a musical artist is featured, very often from a significant live performance.

Another segment, which climaxes in the end of the show, was the Head to Head. Two closely matched musical artists and a representative song from each, are announced at the beginning of the show, and then listeners, as was mentioned with the interactive listening aspect, are to communicate to the show live, by email, text message, on the website, which of the two artists and respective song they want played out at the end of the show. The choice is purely the up to the listeners.

Innovations with this show include the interplay of several new technological forces being applied to radio.

Another challenging thematic innovation of the show was the blending and balancing of current popular music, classic session and performance music from the BBC archives, and new music.

== See also ==
- Jane Gazzo's Dream Ticket
- BBC Radio 6 Music
- BBC
