= List of riots in Leeds =

Throughout its history Leeds has had several riots, often recurring in the same areas. Below is a list of recorded riots that have taken place. The most famous of these is perhaps the 1981 Chapeltown riot, which took place the same time as riots in London (Brixton), Birmingham (Handsworth) and Liverpool (Toxteth).

- 1735 Corn price riot
- 1753 The turnpike riots
- 1754 Holbeck Chapel Riot
- 1797 Cross Flatts Riot
- 1800 Corn price riot
- 1811 Corn price riot
- 1842 The Chartist and Plug riots in Holbeck and Hunslet
- 1844 The Military riot
- 1865 Leeds dripping riot
- 1890 The Gasworkers riot
- 1893 Morley miners' riot
- 1908 The suffragette riot
- 1917 An anti-Jewish riot, Quarry Hill
- 1936 The Battle of Holbeck Moor
- 1975 Chapeltown riot
- 1981 Chapeltown riots
- 1987 Chapeltown riot
- 1995 Hyde Park Riot
- 2001 Harehills riot
- 2002 Leeds Festival riots
- The 2011 England riots saw "pockets of disorder" in Leeds
- 2019 Harehills Bonfire Riot
- 2024 Harehills riot
