= 1981 Moss Side riot =

Riot in Manchester, England

In July 1981, the inner-city district of Moss Side in Manchester, England, was the scene of mass protesting. The protests at Moss Side started at the local police station and later moved into the surrounding streets over two days. Key factors seen as fuel for this protest were racial tension, due to frequent allegations of police officers racially abusing and using excessive force against black youths in the area, and mass unemployment brought on by the early 1980s recession. Unemployment was at a post-war high across the nation during 1981, but was much higher than the national average in Moss Side.

== Background ==
Moss Side in 1981 was 65% White British, 5% Other White, 20% Afro-Caribbean and 10% Asian, with a large proportion of teenagers as the total population.

== Initial riot and police response ==
On 8 July 1981, a crowd of more than 1,000 youths besieged the police station at Moss Side, Manchester. All windows in the building were broken, and twelve police vehicles were set on fire. Police reinforcements equipped with riot shields and protective crash helmets were deployed around the station. A second attempt was made by crowds to attack the police station and during this a policeman was shot with a crossbow bolt through his leg.

== Community meeting ==
Following the violence, Chief Constable James Anderton of Greater Manchester met with local community leaders including councillors, churchmen and youth workers. Agreements made in this meeting were later disputed. James Anderton stated in his official report about the riots that per request from the community leaders, he ordered his officers to maintain a low profile and avoid further confrontations, to allow the leaders time to ease tension among the young people and disperse the crowds. The community leaders that attended the meeting denied that they had demanded that police withdraw from Moss Side. Anderton later told the Greater Manchester Police Committee that the community leaders had failed to deliver on their promise to restore peace and were simply unable to admit their lack of influence over the people engaged in the rioting.

== Stopping the riot ==
The "low profile" approach of Greater Manchester Police (GMP) and the efforts of the community leaders failed to stop the protests which lasted for some 48 hours over two nights, with much burning and looting of shops all the way down Princess Road, Claremont Road and the surrounding areas, including Rusholme.

The Moss Side protests ended on the night of 11 July, when Anderton ordered his officers to advance and clear the streets of protesters in a massive show of force. James Anderton had used the previous two days to build up enough officers trained and equipped in public order tactics. A mobile task force of 560 officers in 50 transit vans and Land Rovers had been assembled in local police stations around the area of protests. As part of the planned dispersal operation, Anderton authorized use of vehicle based rapid dispersal tactics; previously only used by the Royal Ulster Constabulary (RUC) and the British Army in Northern Ireland. These tactics involved vehicles containing "snatch squads" being driven at high speed into groups of protesters, with officers then leaping out to make arrests.

Over two hours, 150 people were arrested with no police injuries reported. Afterwards, the Moss Side section of Princess Road (a main road south from Manchester centre) was closed for several days while adjacent buildings and gas mains damaged in the riot and fires were made safe.

It has been reported that Anderton had earlier given a speech to the assembled officers at Moss Side Police Station encouraging them to restore order as rapidly as possible and promising them his full support in the event of any complaints of excessive force.

Anti-racism campaigner Louise Da-Cocodia helped transport victims of the Moss Side protest to hospital, and later sat on the Hytner inquiry panel investigating the causes of the unrest.

== Conclusion and response ==
The police response to the riot resulted in a new low in confidence in the police in the local area. The absence of police during the looting on Princess Road followed by a large-scale police response afterward which resulted in the assault and arrest of innocent people, including a local reggae band, drew criticism. Among others, a local community organiser looking to help the injured was stopped and verbally abused by police. County councillor and vice-chair of the police Gabrielle Cox described the events as "the death of the community". After the riots there were allegations from local residents, community leaders and lawyers that groups of police officers in vans had been observed cruising the streets of Moss Side during the riots, racially abusing and using indiscriminate violence against any young people seen on the streets.

Interviewed in a 1992 BBC documentary on his career following his retirement as Chief Constable of Greater Manchester, James Anderton described his strategy during the Moss Side riots:

"When trouble arises and violence occurs on the street, you hit it fast and hard. And that's what we did the following night. We hit the rioters fast and hard with all the force at our disposal-legitimate and lawful force-and we crushed the riots in Manchester in 24 hours."

Outside of the affected area, Anderton's handling of riots received praise from the wider media, politicians, and public. The use of snatch squads and vehicles to disperse rioters was unique in British public order policing at that time, and the response of Greater Manchester Police was contrasted favourably with the perceived loss of control and high police casualties during the earlier Toxteth riots. William Whitelaw, the Home Secretary, described the dispersal operation as a "conspicuous success".

James Anderton's Greater Manchester Police were the only police force in England at that time equipped with protective riot helmets with visors for use by its officers in public situations. This was unlike the Metropolitan Police in Brixton, and the Merseyside police in Toxteth, who sent their officers to face petrol bombs and missile attacks in traditional helmets and tunics.

In a 2006 retrospective on the 25th anniversary of the riots, Manchester Central's Chief Supt Dave Thompson said that the police had simply not met the needs of the community. Academic Gus John said that "police used to criminalise young people for no good reason", and that the community saw the hypocrisy of certain officers who stopped and searched youths in Moss Side while on duty but drank and smoked at the area's illegal shebeens while off-duty. In 1998 during the Lawrence Review Chief Constable David Wilmot of the Greater Manchester Police stated that there was institutional racism in the force. Anderton declined to comment on the 25th anniversary review.

In the long term, investment totalling £400 million into the community improved conditions in the area. This particularly focused on the Alexandra Park Estate, which had been at the centre of the riots. The estate had poor housing and was a focal point for drug dealing in Manchester. In 2005 Chief Constable Michael Todd established a community-centred policing structure for Moss Side, consisting of dedicated staff of an inspector, four sergeants and 35 constables.

== See also ==
- England riots in 1981
- Brixton riot (1981) - London
- Chapeltown riot (1981) - Leeds
- Handsworth riots - Birmingham
- Toxteth riots - Liverpool
- List of riots
- Urban riots
