= 2001 Harehills riot =

Riot in Leeds, England

- A street fire during the riots
- Date: 5–6 June 2001; 25 years ago
- Location: Harehills, Leeds, England
- Caused by: Arrest of Hossein Miah; Anti-police sentiment
- Methods: Rioting, arson, looting

Parties
Local residents of Harehills	West Yorkshire Police

Casualties
- Injuries: 25
- Arrested: 19+ (25 jailed)
- Damage: £500,000 (estimated)

On 5 June 2001, a riot broke out in the Harehills area of Leeds, England, triggered by the allegedly wrongful and heavy-handed arrest of Hossein Miah, an Asian man, by West Yorkshire Police. More than 200 people, predominantly Asian youths, were involved in the seven-hour-long clash against the police, which continued into the early hours of 6 June.

Numerous people – 23 police officers and two journalists – were injured in the incident, and 25 rioters were jailed as a result. The police officer who arrested Miah was later cleared of any wrongdoing.

== Background ==
Harehills is an ethnically diverse working class suburb of Leeds, with significant populations of Asians and Muslims.

Hossein Miah, a 31-year-old Asian man, was arrested on the evening of Sunday, 3 June 2001 over an allegedly suspicious tax disc. Miah was sitting in his Vauxhall Cavalier outside a mosque preparing to go shopping with his wife and children when he was approached by a police officer who accused him of stealing the tax disc. Miah alleges the officer caused him injury, by pulling him from his car and spraying him with CS spray.

Word of the allegedly violent nature of Miah's arrest spread around the local area, and this was quickly attributed as the cause of the violence.

== Riot ==
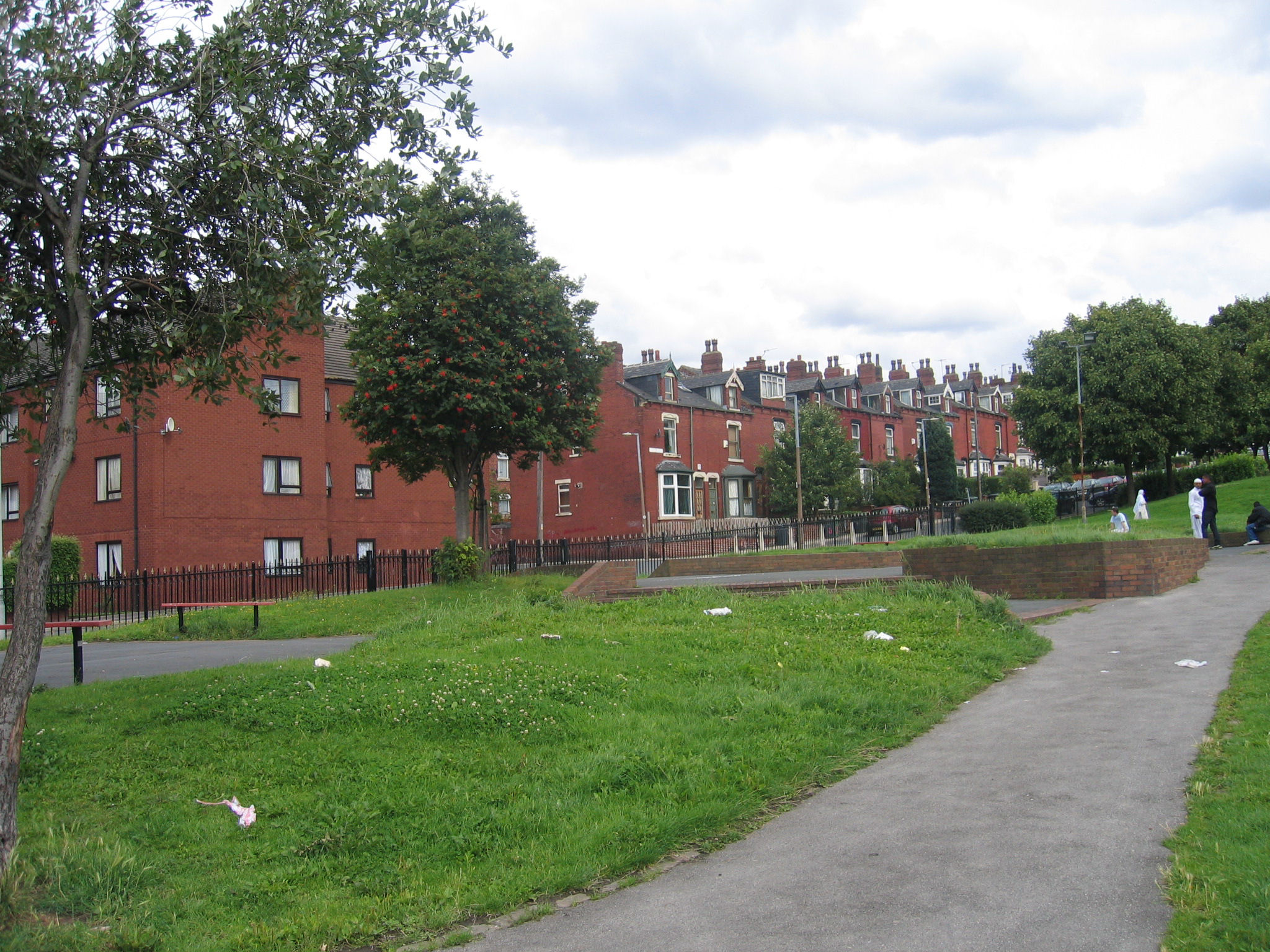
Banstead Park, where the riot began.

At 20:25 BST on Tuesday, 5 June, a hoax 999 call was made saying a police officer had been hit by a petrol bomb. Sporadic unrest had reportedly already begun in the area by that point. The police could not locate the alleged petrol bombing, however the call lured them into Banstead Park, where they were met by a barricade of burning washing machines and furniture, looted from a nearby second-hand shop.

It was in Banstead Park where most of the confrontation took place, although the disturbances spread onto Roundhay Road, Roseville Road and smaller residential streets towards the south side of Harehills.

Rioting continued into the early hours of the following morning. Over the course of the night, 26 cars were burnt out, two police officers and two journalists were severely injured, and a shop was set alight. Both police officers and members of the public were pelted with bottles and bricks. 23 police officers were later reported to have injured.

By 02:15 on 6 June, after over 200 participants spent over six hours rioting, the police managed to make enough arrests to quell the size of the crowd to a point where most rioters had dispersed and the police could regain control. The disorder was over by 03:00.

A burnt-out car in the aftermath of the riot

== Aftermath ==
Many arrests were made following the rioting; local shops were initially advised only to secure their premises and not to reglaze, as police feared further rioting would take place, however the violence did not continue beyond 6 June.

The disorder was condemned by police chiefs; ACC Steve Smith said there was "no excuse" for the rioting, and ACC Graham Maxwell said the rioting was "criminal activity, pure and simple" and described it as "a premeditated attack on police".

Six people were arrested on the night; this number had grown to 19 by 7 August, two months later. The disorder caused damage estimated at around £500,000.

On 7 March 2002, nine months after the riot, 25 men were imprisoned after being found guilty of their involvement in the riot. The police officer who arrested Miah faced a Police Complaints Authority disciplinary hearing, but the hearing concluded no misconduct was committed in the arrest, and the officer was cleared in March 2003.

== See also ==
- 2024 Harehills riot
- Chapeltown riot (1975)
- Chapeltown riot (1981)
- Chapeltown riot (1987)
- List of riots in Leeds
