= 1981 England riots =

Series of riots in England in April and July 1981

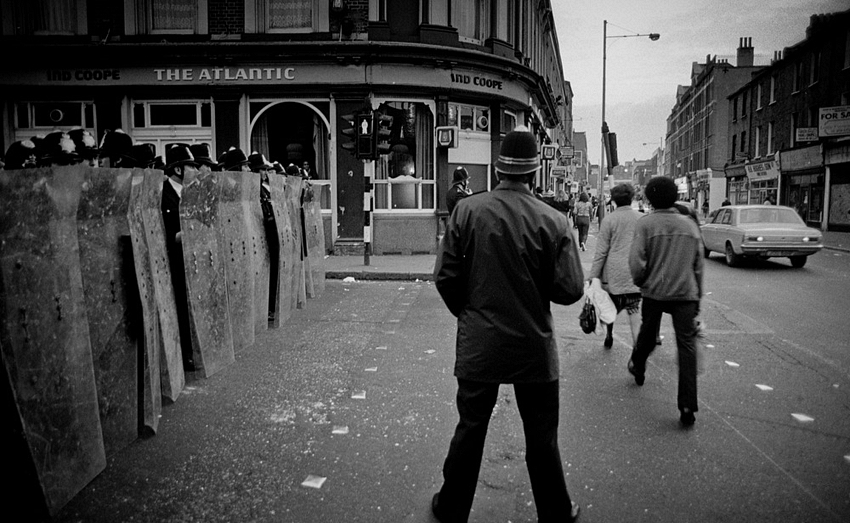
- Police with riot shields in Brixton, London, in April 1981
- Date: April 1981–July 1981
- Location: Birmingham, Leeds, Liverpool, London, Manchester, Nottingham

In April and July 1981, there were riots in several cities and towns in England. The riots mainly involved Black British youth clashing with police. They were caused by tension between Black people and the police, especially perceived racist discrimination against Black people through increased use of stop-and-search, and were also fuelled by inner-city deprivation. The most serious riots were the April Brixton riots in London, followed in July by the Toxteth riots in Liverpool, the Handsworth riots in Birmingham, the Chapeltown riots in Leeds, and the Moss Side riots in Manchester. There were also a series of less serious riots in other towns and cities. As a result of the riots, the government commissioned the Scarman Report.

== Context ==
=== Racial tensions ===
In all the four main cases, these areas had large ethnic minority communities, who had largely immigrated from the Commonwealth in the 1950s and 1960s to do low-paid manual jobs. All the areas suffered from poor housing (mostly dating from the 19th and early 20th centuries), high unemployment and particular problems with racial tensions. According to the subsequently commissioned Scarman report the riots were a spontaneous outburst of built-up resentment sparked by particular incidents. Lord Scarman stated that "complex political, social and economic factors" created a "disposition towards violent protest". The Scarman report highlighted problems of racial disadvantage and inner-city decline, warning that "urgent action" was needed to prevent racial disadvantage becoming an "endemic, ineradicable disease threatening the very survival of our society".

Brixton (London), Toxteth (Liverpool) and Chapeltown (Leeds) were originally built as affluent areas of these cities. However the relocation of industry, rising popularity of homes on new private housing estates since the 1930s, poor connections and the influx of migrant workers had led to a downfall in their fortunes and the large Victorian terraces and villas were often divided up into low-rent bedsits, and many of those still existing as houses had been bought by landlords who let them to tenants.

The First Thatcher ministry (Conservative Party) elected in May 1979 had instituted new powers for the police under the Vagrancy Act 1824 to stop and search people based on only a "reasonable suspicion" that an offence had been committed – hence their common name of "sus laws". These were applied disproportionately to the Black community, and caused widespread resentment amongst young Black men. The majority of these were not immigrants; they were the British-born children of immigrants, mostly born in the late 1950s or the first half of the 1960s (Baby boomers).

=== Economic circumstances ===
The election of the Conservatives in 1979 had also seen the implementation by the Thatcher government of monetarist economic policies that were designed to tackle inflation, which had peaked at 27% just before the election, dropped to 22% in 1980 and was still above 10% by 1981. In 1979, the second oil price crisis started.

Although inflation was falling by 1981, unemployment was still rising and the recession was now in its second year. By April 1981, unemployment exceeded 2.5 million, having stood at 1.5 million two years earlier. Less than a decade earlier, unemployment had still been in six figures and it had stood at less than 400,000 as recently as the early 1960s. The inner city areas affected by the 1981 riots were among those hit particularly hard by the recession and the unemployment and other social issues that came with it.

This level of unemployment, not seen since the 1930s (Great Depression in the United Kingdom), had led to mass discontent in the working-class areas of Britain most affected by the recession. Black youth, also dealing with growing racism and discrimination, were especially badly hit.

=== Police powers ===
The Asian community also felt isolated and vulnerable to racist attack. The police were given new powers to question people about their immigration status. Resentment arose that these laws were applied, but the police were failing to protect the Asian community from violence. On 11 July 1981, the "Bradford 12"—a group of Asian youths, members of the "United Black Youth League"—were arrested for manufacturing petrol bombs, allegedly to protect their community from a threatened attack. At the subsequent trial, they were acquitted by a jury, on the grounds of self-defence.

On 18 January 1981, thirteen Black youths died in the New Cross Fire in London when a house was reportedly petrol bombed. The police quickly dismissed a racial motive for the apparent arson attack; and the local Black community were dismayed by the indifference shown in the press towards the deaths. 15,000 people marched demanding action to Central London, in the largest Black issue demonstration seen in the UK.

Racial tensions continued to rise in the early part of the year. On 28 March 1981, Enoch Powell—by then an Ulster Unionist MP, but still an influence on the Conservative Party—gave a speech in which he warned of the dangers of a "racial civil war" in Britain. Powell had been dismissed from the shadow cabinet in 1968 by the then Tory leader Edward Heath following his controversial Rivers of Blood speech in which he predicted mass civil unrest if Commonwealth immigration continued. Three years later, when still a Tory MP, he warned of an "explosion" unless there was a massive repatriation scheme for the immigrants. Racial tension had been particularly high in Wolverhampton, where Powell was an MP, and the town was one of those affected by the less serious waves of rioting during 1981.

By 6 April, overall unemployment had risen from 1.5 million to 2.5 million in 12 months; and that joblessness among ethnic minorities had risen faster, up 82% in the same period. During March and April, the Metropolitan Police began "Operation Swamp 81", a London-wide campaign against burglary and robbery. In Brixton, over only six days, 120 plain-clothes officers stopped 943 people, arresting 118—predominantly Black youths. The police justified their style of policing by statistics showing that while street robberies had increased 38% across London between 1976 and 1980; in Brixton it had risen 138%.

The first disturbances began in Brixton over the weekend of 10–12 April 1981, and were followed in July by a series of similar disturbances in more than 35 cities and towns, especially Liverpool. In London, these included Dalston, Stoke Newington, Clapham, Hounslow and Acton. Kenneth Leech, the Race Relations Field Officer of the Church of England's Board for Social Responsibility, noted "Here these were not race riots—riots between races. Rather the conflict was with police as symbols of white authority, with state racism and criminalisation of Black communities".

== Aftermath ==
These riots in areas of high unemployment brought to Government attention that strategies for helping young people into work were not working. The Youth Training Scheme and similar schemes were brought in for school leavers.

The Association of Chief Police Officers, who develop police policy in England, produced their Public Order Manual in response to the riots. This was subsequently used in training by police forces throughout Britain.

The UK government commissioned the Scarman report two days after the Brixton Riots. The terms of reference for the enquiry were "to inquire urgently into the serious disorder in Brixton on 10–12 April 1981 and to report, with the power to make recommendations".

Scarman was concerned with the "plight" of the ethnic communities in UK inner cities and their relationship with the rest of the national "community". He concluded that it was essential that "people are encouraged to secure a stake in, feel a pride in, and have a sense of responsibility for their own area". He called for a policy of "direct coordinated attack on racial disadvantage".

As a consequence of the Scarman report a new code for police behaviour was put forward in the Police and Criminal Evidence Act 1984; and the act also created an independent Police Complaints Authority, established in 1985, to attempt to restore public confidence in the police.

The sus law was repealed on 27 August 1981, when the Criminal Attempts Act 1981 received Royal Assent.

== Triggers ==
While there were common root causes, the triggers of the riots were different.

=== Brixton ===
On the evening of 10 April, at around 17:15, a Black youth was stabbed by three other Black youths in an attack seen by a police patrol in Atlantic Road. As he was being helped, a large hostile crowd gathered. As the police tried to take him to a waiting car on Railton Road, the crowd intervened. The police were attacked and the struggle only ended when more police officers arrived; the youth was taken to a hospital. The crowd is reported to have believed that the police stopped and questioned the stabbed youth, rather than help him. Rumours spread that the youth had been left to die by the police or that the police looked on as the stabbed youth was lying on the street. More than 200 youths reportedly turned on the police. In response the police decided to increase the number of police foot patrols in Railton Road, despite the tensions, and continue "Operation Swamp 81" throughout the night of Friday the 10th and into the following day, Saturday, 11 April. During the disturbances, 299 police were injured, and at least 65 civilians. 61 private vehicles and 56 police vehicles were damaged or destroyed. 28 premises were burned and another 117 damaged and looted. 82 arrests were made. Reports suggested that up to 5,000 people were involved in the riot.

=== Handsworth ===
The first riot in Handsworth, Birmingham, took place on 10 July 1981. A second riot, which would prove more serious, took place in the area four years later. The riots were reportedly sparked by the arrest of a man near the Acapulco Cafe, Lozells and a police raid on the Villa Cross public house in the same area. Hundreds of people attacked police and property, looting and smashing, even setting off fire bombs.

=== Chapeltown ===
The exact trigger for the riots is unclear, although much speculation took place in the local and national press. By 1981, Chapeltown, in Leeds, was experiencing a high level of violent crime, tensions were high, particularly among the area's Caribbean majority. The high crime brought about a police purge, and the riots took place in July 1981.

=== Toxteth ===
The Merseyside police force had, at the time, a poor reputation within the Black community for stopping and searching young Black men in the area, under the "sus" laws, and the perceived heavy-handed arrest of Leroy Alphonse Cooper on Friday 3 July, watched by an angry crowd, led to a disturbance in which three policemen were injured. By 1981, Liverpool had one of the highest unemployment rates in Britain, with Toxteth having one of the city's highest unemployment rates. During the riots, ‘police were attacked by youths with petrol bombs and paving stones’ and ‘CS gas was used for the first time on the UK mainland, a man died, knocked down by a police vehicle, 500 people were arrested [and] 468 police were hurt’

=== Moss Side ===
As with several other of the 1981 riots, the exact trigger for the riots in Moss Side, Manchester, remains unclear, but there were frequent allegations of police officers using excessive force against black youths in the area.

=== Other riots ===
There was also rioting in a number of other English cities and towns in 1981, although most of these riots were less serious and attracted less media attention than the highly publicised rioting in areas like Brixton and Toxteth.

Rioting also occurred in the Dingle, Liverpool, and the Cantril Farm district of Liverpool, although neither of these riots were as serious as the Toxeth riots.

Brixton was not the only part of London to be affected by rioting. Disturbances in the districts of Southall and Battersea resulted in fire stations being targeted by rioters and ultimately evacuated for the safety of staff.

There was also rioting in Bradford, Halifax, Blackburn, Preston, Birkenhead, Ellesmere Port, Chester, Stoke, Shrewsbury, Wolverhampton, Birmingham, High Wycombe, Southampton, Newcastle-upon-Tyne, Knaresborough, Leeds, Hull, Huddersfield, Sheffield, Stockport, Nottingham, Derby, Leicester, Luton, Maidstone, Aldershot and Portsmouth. Several of these areas were already known for racial tension and many of them had high levels of unemployment.

== See also ==
- 1981 in the United Kingdom
- 2001 England riots
- 2011 England riots
- "The Guns of Brixton", "Ghost Town"
- Uprising (TV series)
- Hyson Green
- 2024 United Kingdom riots
