= United Black Youth League =

English political organisation

- Formation: 1981
- Purpose: Anti-fascism, anti-imperialism, anti-racism
- Headquarters: Bradford
- Region served: West Yorkshire

The United Black Youth League (UBYL) was an English militant anti-fascist, anti-imperialist and anti-racist self-defence organisation from Bradford, West Yorkshire, primarily made up of South Asian-descended young people. It was founded in 1981 as a splinter group of the Asian Youth Movement, later that year twelve of its members, referred to as the Bradford Twelve by media outlets, were "charged following allegations that they had manufactured explosives in anticipation of a large scale attack by fascist groups", being acquitted in June 1982 when the court decided they had acted in self-defence. A variety of journalists and scholars described the case as the "trial of the decade".

The activism of the UBYL in addition to multiple adjacent organisations, led local councils throughout Yorkshire to reform aspects of their school systems including the introduction of non-religious assemblies, allowing Muslim girls to wear trousers, increasing the availability of halal food in school canteens and requiring teachers to monitor racial abuse incidents.

== Formation ==
The organisation was formed following the splintering of the Asian Youth Movement, another anti-racist group active in Bradford, which saw the manifestation of two distinct factions, one of which eventually incorporated itself into the Labour Party, while what would become the United Black Youth League sought immediate militant action. Although the two groups continued to campaign cooperatively, the Asian Youth Movement officially distanced itself from the League. The fragmentation of AYM and subsequent formation of the UBYL was based on a grant given to AYM by the government, which future UBYL members believed to be tying the group to the government in a way they didn't agree with. The split was decided by democratic vote which decided in the formation of a new governmentally independent organisation. It was officially formed at the beginning of 1981.

Dr. Anandi Ramamurthy referred to the beginnings of the organisation as being a response to the growing racial division, namely the lack of police opposition to it, in the United Kingdom in the early 1980s, citing the 1980 police raid of the Black and White Café, the 1981 New Cross house fire and the introduction of Margaret Thatcher's Swamp 81, a stop and search operation targeted at young black people, as examples. These events, as well as the burning of the Hambrough Tavern in Southall led to what mainstream media outlets such as the Daily Mail, the Daily Telegraph and the Guardian presented as a war on police by black people. According to Lived Diversities: Space, Place and Identities in the Multi-Ethnic City, the number of racial abuse incidents that law enforcement ignored was up to 45,000. Member Tariq Mehmood cited "Paki-bashing", the act of groups of white people assaulting South Asians, and frequent harassment and assaults from police officers as key parts of the formation of the League. To confront this, members would patrol streets at night in groups of between fifteen and twenty in an attempt to discourage violence against both the members and those who unassociated who happened to be found. At the time, organised self-defence measures such as these were illegal.

== Campaigns ==
The group campaigned against the deportation of Nasari Begnum, who received a deportation order upon her divorce from her husband who held a British citizenship.

The League also organised protests in support of Anwar Ditta, a British-born Asian women, whom the Home Office refused to allow her to bring her Pakistan-born children to live with her. While the Home Office claimed that there was no proof that Ditta's children were those of her and her husband, the League's protests led to the use of newly invented DNA profiling, to prove that they were and were granted access to stay.

UBYL campaigned against the prosecution of Gary Pemberton, Black security guard who was accused of assaulting a police officer. The members investigated the allegations and protests his arrest, eventually finding that it was the officer who had in fact assaulted Pemberton.

== Bradford Twelve trial ==
On 30 June 1981, twelve members of the league were arrested in Bradford after a police raid found them in possession of thirty eight milk bottles filled with petrol. The members claimed that they were a preemptive self-defence measure against the possibility of attacks from white power skinhead gangs and National Front members, which were commonplace at the time through the events that led to the 1981 England riots and related hate crimes. In 2006, former member Saeed Hussain stated, in reference to the events, that "we would not let fascists walk in and actually destroy a part of Bradford where Black communities lived. So we took a decision that we would actually find ways of defending the community ourselves. And that decision led to the fact that Molotov Cocktails were manufactured and they were hidden and as and when the need arose we would be prepared to use those."

On 5 August 1981, the Evening Standard reported that "A plot to petrol bomb a city's police, skinheads and large stores was foiled when its three ring leaders were arrested", with the Daily Telegraph reporting the next day that "Eleven Asians" were arrested "in plot to bomb police" and the Sheffield Star reporting "Bomb Factory find in Yorks: Police smashed a huge petrol bomb factory in Yorkshire today... taking charge of at least 100 bombs and holding four men for questioning". Whereas the Telegraph & Argus reported that "very little had actually taken place". According to Race and Racism in Contemporary Britain by John Solomos, these statements were taken solely from the police prosecution, with no newspapers presenting the position of the defence.

In a 1981 article by Class Struggle newspaper, it was cited that "they were subject to racist abuse, threats and brutality". According to a 2006 statement from League member Tariq Mehmood, law enforcement attempted to start fights between Mehmood and other inmates during the trial, by having him share a cell with skinheads, however these incidents later became increasingly relaxed.

After the arrests, members of groups such as the Revolutionary Communist Group, Bradford Black, Indian Workers' Association, Gay Liberation Front and Socialist Workers Party established the July 11th Action Committee, an organisation to support the Bradford Twelve. The group held their first meeting at the Arcadian cinema in Bradford on 12 August, which included a speech from Amin Qureshi, a future councillor for the city, and was attended by around 800 local people. Soon, members began campaigning using the slogan "Whose Conspiracy, Police Conspiracy: Free the Bradford 12" and publicising falsified statements that West Yorkshire Police had used in prosecutions in the past. Its prominence led to the formation of two similar pro-Bradford Twelve activist groups: the United Black Youth Defence Committee and the Bradford 12 Defence Campaign. However, conflicts between these groups emerged when members of the July 11th Action Committee accused Bradford Black member Courtney Hayes of making undemocratic decisions in their campaign and Asian Youth Movement founder Marsha Singh banning its members from participating any of the support movements. The United Black Youth League and July 11 Action Committee were then officially disbanded as a means to unify the movement and Singh, facing backlash from his organisations members, lifted the ban for support and paid the bail for Tariq Mehmood Ali and proceeded to defend him in court.

Outside of Bradford, the Bradford 12 National Mobilising Committee was established by members of Big Flame in Leeds, the South London Bradford 12 Support Group was established in London, the Brixton Defence Committee in Brixton and the Liverpool 8 Defence Campaign in Liverpool, all operating under the slogan "Until the 12 are free we are all imprisoned". Frequent demonstrations took place in London, Bradford, Leeds, Birmingham, with one campaign taking place at the offices of the Director of Public Prosecutions in London. This led to increased national visibility, and in a booklet by the Leeds Other Paper, 275 organisations and political figures were listed as supporting acquittal. Some Trotskyist organisations banned support of the Bradford Twelve, namely the Socialist Workers Party, who expelled two of its members, accusing them of black separatism.

All of those arrested, with the exception of Shahnaz Ali who was immediately freed, and the addition another male member arrested soon after the events, went to trial on 26 April 1982 at Bradford Magistrates' Court, under the charge of conspiracy. The police argued that group, orchestrated by three ringleaders, were planning an assault on them, while the defendants pleaded not guilty for self-defence. According to Ruth Bundey, a solicitor for the League, she presented the group's narrative of a political race struggle, however other "solicitors would stand up immediately after... and say they wished to disassociate themselves from my remarks and this was not a case of politics but simply a case of young men misled by others". In response to this, the defendants requested a change of solicitors, leading to the threat of complete retracement of legal aid, after which Ruth Bundey and Gareth Peirce offered to lead the defence independent of the other prior solicitors, however Tariq Mehmood chose to represent himself. On the first day of trial, 500 protestors picketed outside the court. The jury was decided to be a group of entirely white people from Leeds, which the defendants contested citing a high possibility of discrimination with Tariq Mehmood asserting that "I think it would be impossible to tell a jury of what my experience and feelings are if there is not even one of my own people on it", leading to the jury's expansion to 100 jurors, including two Asians, with every juror having any ties to far-right organisations needing be investigated. The jury eventually selected was made up of "Asian, African and white working people". When the prosecution argued that "there was no threat in the black community from fascists", trade unionist Dave Stark coordinated research and wrote a report on systematic racial prejudice of attacks in Bradford since the 1970s, partially based a 1981 violent crimes report by the Home Office, to be used by the defendants. In response Chief Inspector Sidebottom "declared he had no knowledge of most of the racist attacks that were mentioned to him, did not know of the local fascist paper New Order nor did he believe that the burning of the Hambrough Tavern in Southall had anything to do with fascists, nor did he keep a record of racist incidents". A quote from prior to the case where Deputy Head of the Criminal Investigation Department in Bradford, DI Holland stated that "Police officers must be prejudiced and discriminatory to do their job" was also presented, in addition to a quote that the prosecutors stated was said by Tarlochan Gata Aura, however was later revealed to be fabricated.

== Ideology ==
The organisation saw the oppression of minority groups such as South Asians and black people as systematically the same, using specifically the word "black" in their name due to its common usage to a variety of minority groups at the time. It formed as a means of confronting the lack of police intervention in violent crimes against minority peoples, and subsequently believed law enforcement to be a repressive form of establishment. Influenced by the teachings of Martin Luther King Jr. and Malcolm X, the members believed socialism to be the way to avoid this discrimination. In particular, members of the group were all also members of political parties espousing the socialist strain of Trotskyist, namely the International Socialists, Workers Revolutionary Party and Militant Tendency.

Member Saeed Hussain referred to its primary as anti-fascism, anti-imperialism and pro-immigration. The members also opposed ethnocracy of all kinds, with many of its Bengali members focusing on anti-Bengali nationalism and many of its Jewish members focusing on anti-Zionism. Although many members were religious, they promoted governmental secularity.

Members were encouraged to join trade unions.
