= West Yorkshire Police =

English territorial police force

- Motto: In the Public Service

Agency overview
- Formed: 1974; 52 years ago
- Preceding agencies: West Yorkshire Constabulary; Leeds City Police; Bradford City Police
- Employees: 9,853
- Volunteers: 403
- Annual budget: £855.3 million
- Legal personality: Police force

Jurisdictional structure
- Operations jurisdiction: West Yorkshire, England
- Map of West Yorkshire Police's jurisdiction
- Area: 2,029 square kilometres (783 sq mi)
- Population: 2,108,000
- Legal jurisdiction: England & Wales
- Constituting instrument: Police Act 1996
- General nature: Local civilian police

Operational structure
- Overseen by: His Majesty's Inspectorate of Constabulary and Fire & Rescue Services; Independent Office for Police Conduct
- Headquarters: Wakefield
- Constables: 4,569 (including 72 Special Constables)
- Police Community Support Officers: 689
- Mayor responsible: Tracy Brabin, Mayor of West Yorkshire
- Agency executive: Sir John Robins, Chief Constable
- Divisions: 5

Facilities
- Stations: 41

Website
- www.westyorkshire.police.uk

West Yorkshire Police, formerly the West Yorkshire Metropolitan Police, is the territorial police force responsible for policing the metropolitan county of West Yorkshire, England. It is the fourth largest territorial police force in England and Wales by number of officers.

== History ==
West Yorkshire Metropolitan Police was formed in 1974, when part of the West Yorkshire Constabulary (itself created in 1968, and covering a much larger area) was amalgamated with the Leeds City Police and Bradford City Police, under the Local Government Act 1972. The force was originally known as the West Yorkshire Constabulary . Some older signs around the Force area, such as the one in the reception of Millgarth Police Station in Leeds city centre, read 'West Yorkshire Metropolitan Police'. The 'Metropolitan' from the police title was dropped in 1986 when the metropolitan county councils were abolished. The new Force was known as the present West Yorkshire Police. Proposals made by the Home Secretary on 21 March 2006 would see the force merge with North Yorkshire Police, South Yorkshire Police and Humberside Police to form a strategic police force for the entire region. This did not take place.

On 12 December 2006, Sir Norman Bettison was announced as the new chief constable, replacing Colin Cramphorn and resigned from his post on 24 October 2012. He was replaced by Temporary Chief Constable John Parkinson until the appointment of Mark Gilmore as chief constable on 1 February 2013.

In 2018, it was reckoned West Yorkshire Police would lose 400 officers from its 4,800 officers due to austerity. In August 2023, the West Yorkshire Police attracted controversy when they arrested an autistic 16-year-old girl in Leeds for telling a female police officer that she looked like her 'lesbian nana' while in her own home.

== Operational structure ==
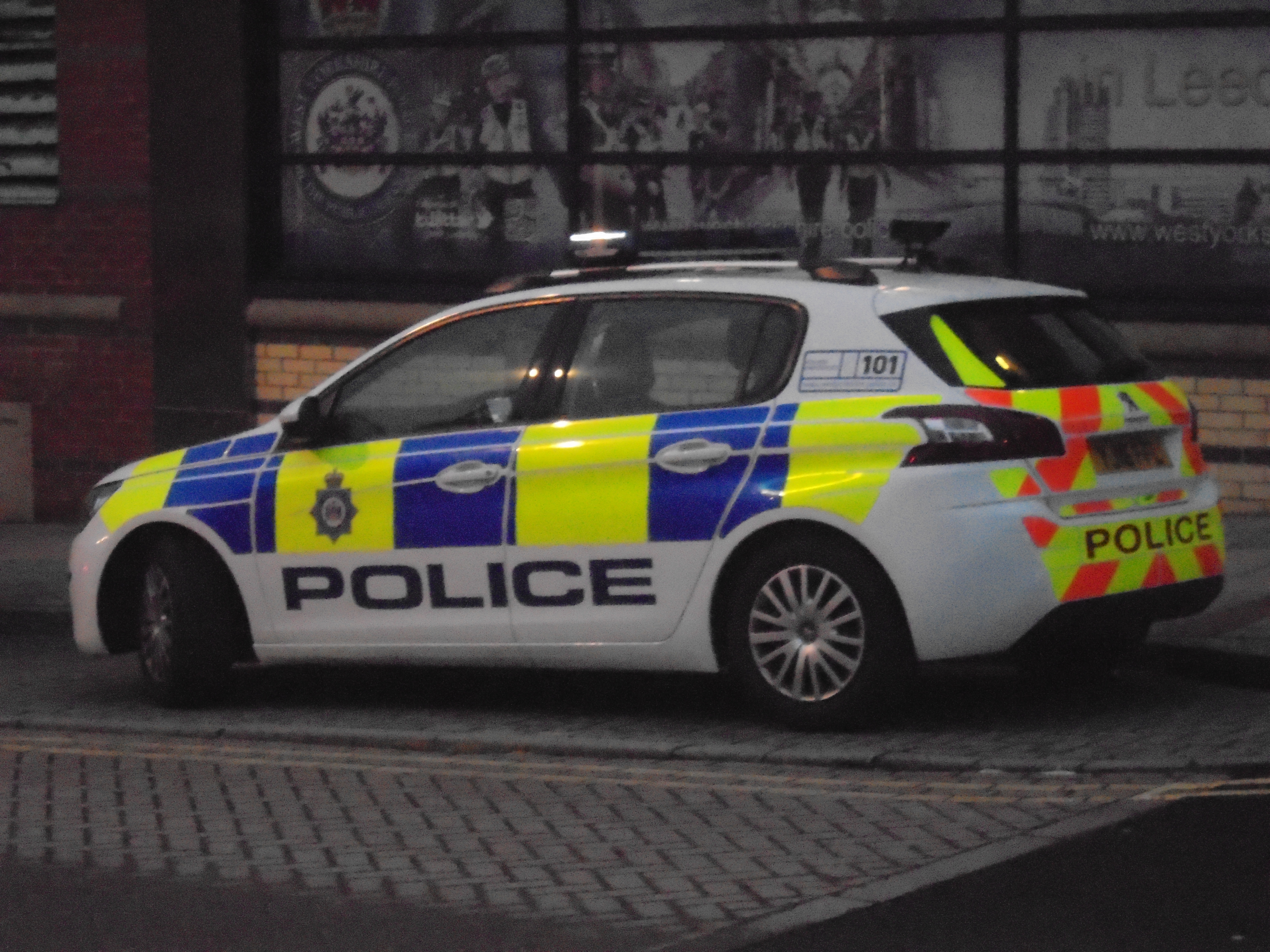
West Yorkshire Police Peugeot 308

For operational purposes West Yorkshire Police is divided into five geographic divisions known within the force as ‘policing districts’. The change in nomenclature reflects that of April 2014 the alignment with council boundaries for policing districts and the reduction of divisions in Leeds (which had three) and Bradford (which had two) so that each policing district was conterminous with its respective local authority boundaries. Each district is made up of Partnership Working Areas (PWA) which consist of an Inspector and three teams of sergeants, police constables, special constables and PCSOs. The first single police commander of the Bradford district, Chief Superintendent Simon Atkin, was appointed in October 2013 as part of ongoing moves to merge the district’s two policing divisions, while Chief Superintendent Angela Williams was appointed in Calderdale.

The five existing divisions with their divisional identifiers are as follows:

Identifier	District	Partnership Working Areas	District HQ
LD	Leeds	City, Inner East, Inner North East, Inner North West, Inner South, Inner West, Outer East, Outer North East, Outer North West, Outer South, Outer West	Elland Road Police Station, Beeston
BD	Bradford	Bradford East, Bradford South, Bradford West, City, Keighley, Shipley	Trafalgar House Police Station, Bradford
WD	Wakefield	Castleford, Normanton and Featherstone, Pontefract and Knottingley, South East, Wakefield Central, Wakefield North West, Wakefield Rural	Havertop Lane Police Station, Normanton
KD	Kirklees	Batley and Spen, Dewsbury and Mirfield, Huddersfield, Rural	Huddersfield Police Station
CD	Calderdale	Halifax Centre, Halifax North, Halifax West, Valley North, Valley North East, Valley South, Valley South East, Valley West	Halifax Police Station

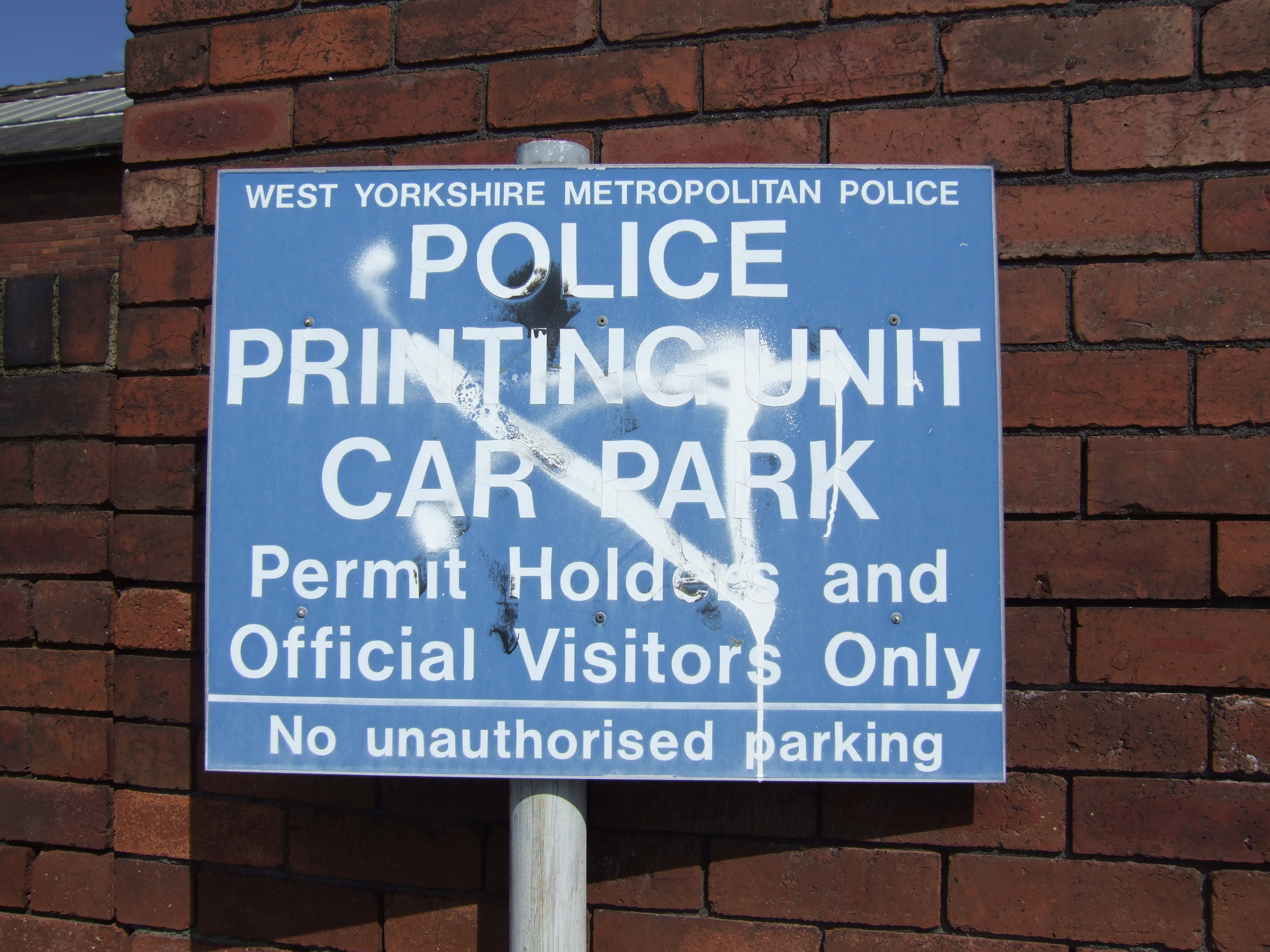
Relic of the former West Yorkshire Metropolitan Police – sign found near former police building in Wakefield city centre (now removed)

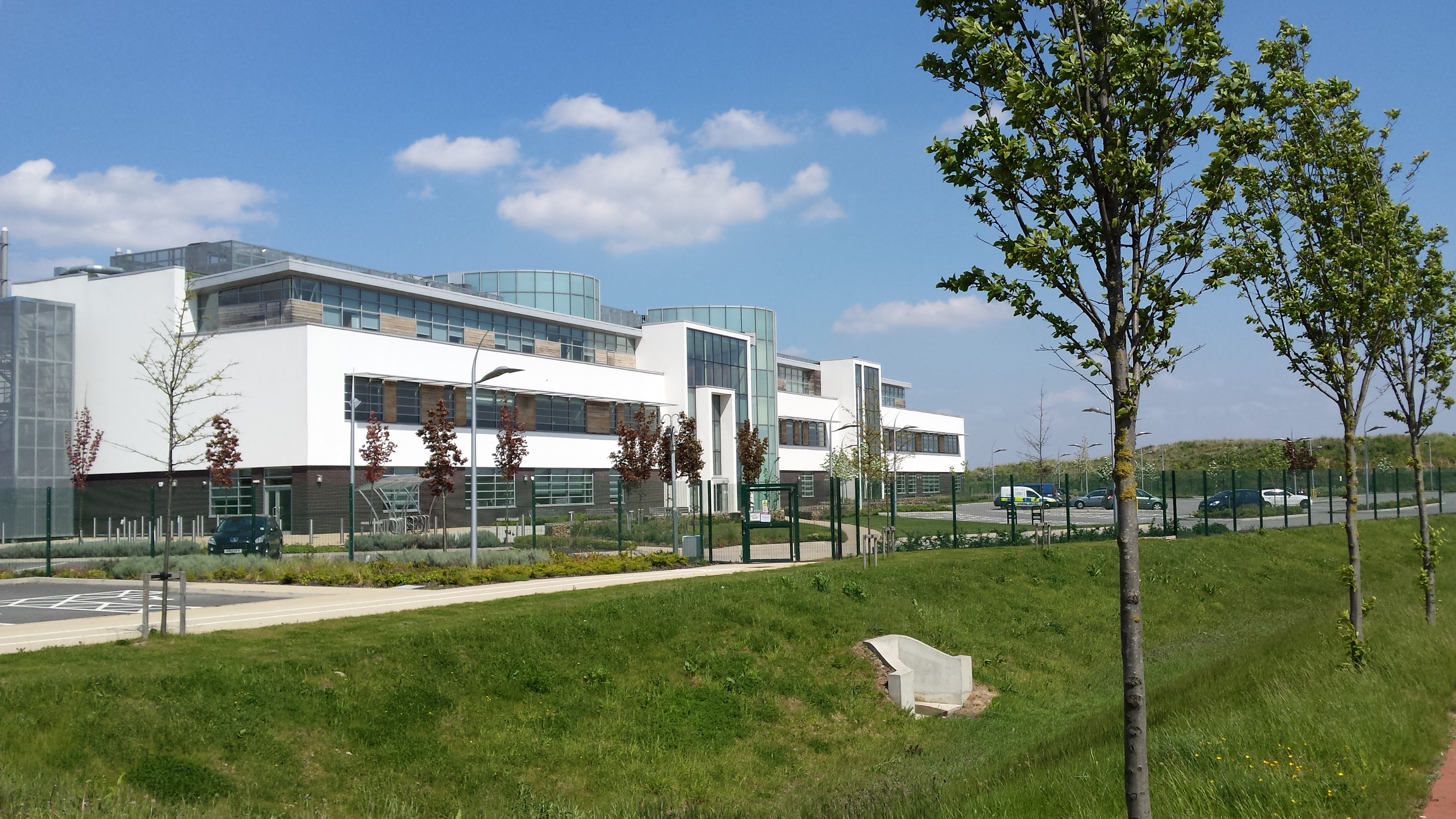
Photograph of the West Yorkshire Police Sir Alec Jeffreys Building – part of the Yorkshire and The Humber Scientific Support Unit at Calder Park, Wakefield, West Yorkshire.

The force headquarters is situated on Laburnum Road to the north of Wakefield city centre along with the Learning and Development Centre and specialist operations facility at Carr Gate, Wakefield at Junction 41 of the M1 motorway.

The Sir Alec Jeffreys Building in the Calder Park Business Estate (at Junction 39 of the M1 motorway) houses the Yorkshire and The Humber Scientific Support Service and was opened in May 2012 by Sir Alec Jeffreys himself. West Yorkshire Police is the 'lead force' for scientific support and provides such services for North Yorkshire Police, South Yorkshire Police and Humberside Police.

== Estate ==
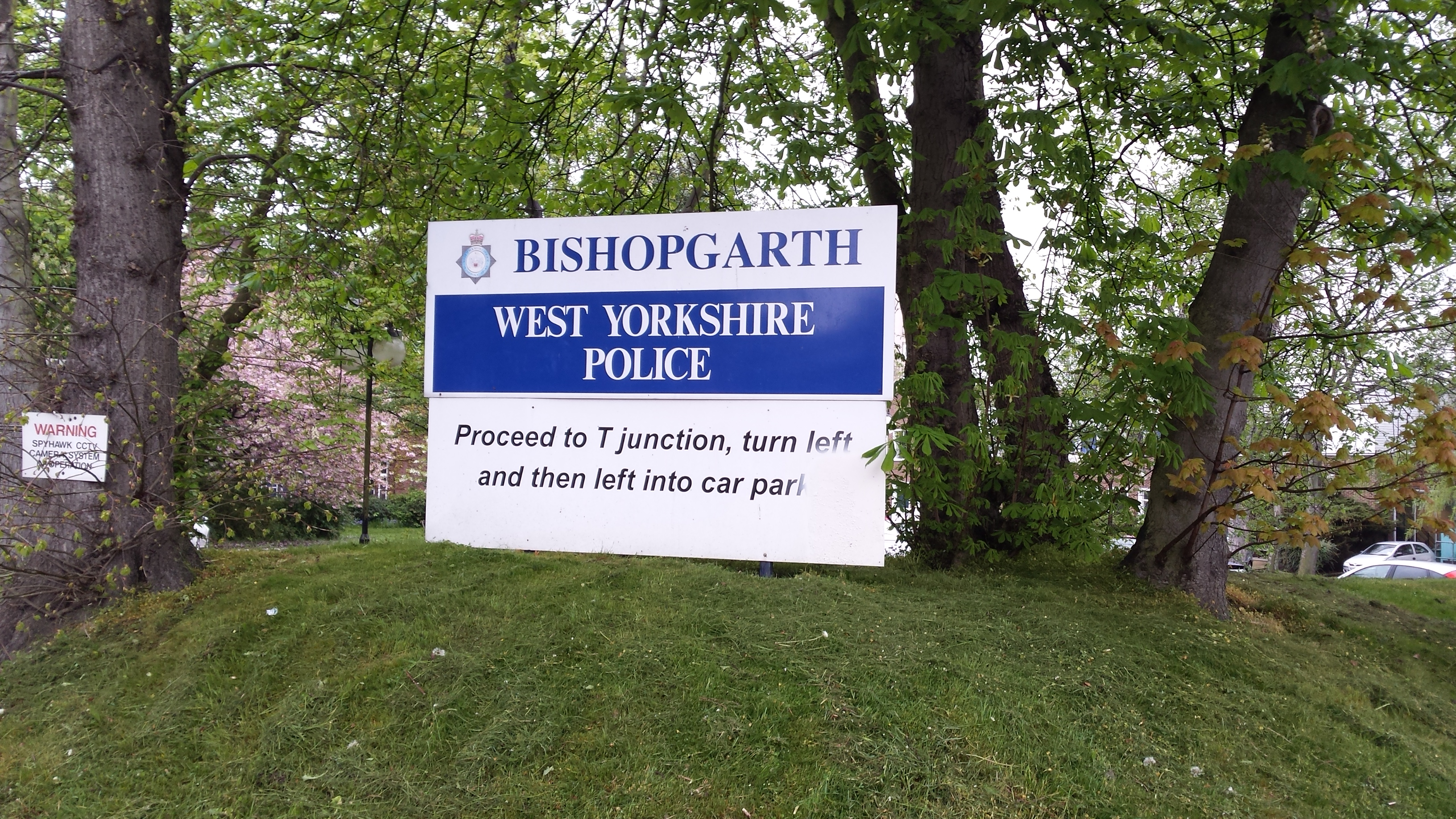
Sign outside of the former West Yorkshire Police Training and Development Centre, Bishopgarth, Wakefield.

The current estate of police stations and other buildings is changing with certain buildings closing and new buildings opening. As of 2014, there are three PFI projects completed and as a result of these new buildings a number of police stations have closed and been sold.

Wakefield district police headquarters is now located on Havertop Lane, Normanton. The total area is 11,500 m^{2} (124,000 square feet) and provides office accommodation as well as a 35-cell custody suite. As a result of its construction, police stations in Wood Street, Wakefield, Normanton, and Castleford were closed.

The new headquarters for the newly formed Leeds district is operational on Elland Road, Beeston, Leeds. The total area is 12,500 m^{2} (135,000 square feet) and provides office accommodation as well as a 40-cell custody suite. It replaced Millgarth, and Holbeck police stations in Leeds.

The existing operational support facilities at Carr Gate, Wakefield were expanded and new buildings constructed which provide centralised specialist training for the force in one location. The new facility, which totals 20,000 m^{2} (220,000 square feet) includes:

- Training hub facility (reception, classrooms, three gyms, storage and offices etc.)
- Public order training facility (storage areas, breakout areas, large briefing room, classroom, training arena, etc.)
- Driver training facility
- Firearms training facility – 100-metre (330 ft) and two 50-metre (160 ft) firing ranges, armoury, etc.
- Method of entry area – approximately 400 m^{2} (4,300 square feet)

== Leadership ==
=== List of chief constables ===
West Riding Constabulary

- Major-General Llewellyn William Atcherley (1908–1919)
- Captain Henry Studdy (1944 to 1959)
- George Edward Scott (1959 to 1969)

West Yorkshire Constabulary (1968)

- Ronald Gregory (1969 to 1983)

West Yorkshire Police (1974)

- Sir Colin Sampsom (1983 to 1988)
- Peter Nobes (1988 to 1993)
- Keith Hellawell (1993 to 1998)
- Alan Charlesworth (acting 1998)
- Graham Moore (9 March 1998 to 2002)
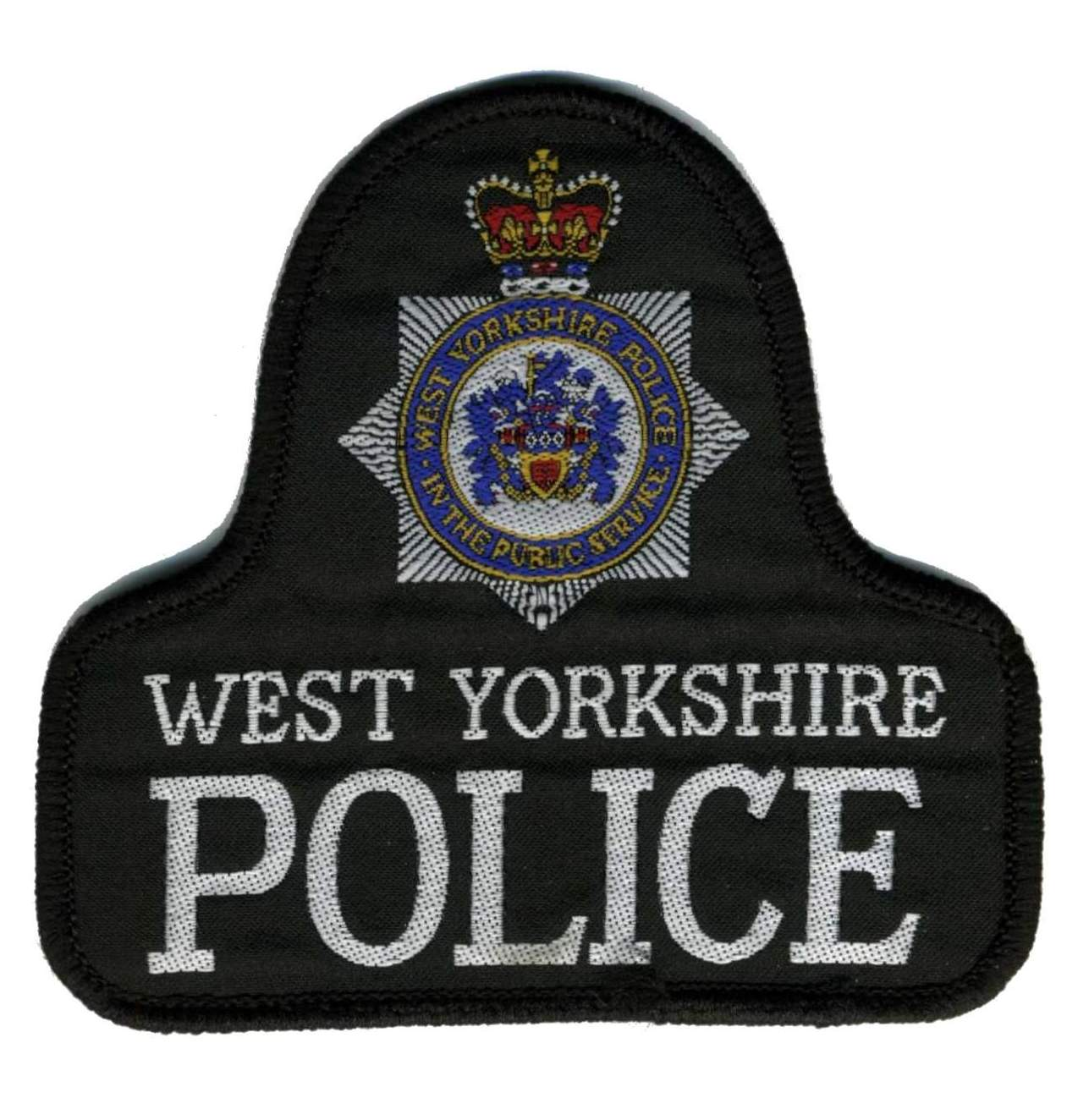
- West Yorkshire Police Patch
  Colin Cramphorn (10 November 2002 to November 2006)
- Sir Norman Bettison (January 2007 to October 2012)
- Mark Gilmore (April 2013 to August 2016)
- Dee Collins (appointed November 2016) [temporary chief constable between June 2014 and November 2016]
- Sir John Robins (appointed June 2019)

=== Police and crime commissioner ===
From November 2012 until May 2021, the West Yorkshire Police and Crime Commissioner was Mark Burns-Williamson. In 2021, his role was abolished when Tracy Brabin was elected Mayor of West Yorkshire and assumed responsibility for the force.

== PEEL inspection ==
Her Majesty's Inspectorate of Constabulary and Fire & Rescue Services (HMICFRS) conducts a periodic police effectiveness, efficiency and legitimacy (PEEL) inspection of each police service's performance. In its latest PEEL inspection, Home Office Performance and Measurement was rated as follows:

	Outstanding	Good	Adequate	Requires Improvement	Inadequate
2021 rating	Preventing crime; Treatment of the public; Disrupting serious organised crime; Good use of resources	Responding to the public; Protecting vulnerable people; Managing offenders; Developing a positive workplace	Investigating crime; Supporting victims		

== Notable cases ==
- The hunt for the Yorkshire Ripper (1975 to 1981)
- M62 coach bombing (1974) lead to the wrongful conviction of Judith Ward
- Murder of Lesley Molseed (1975) and subsequent miscarriage of justice for Stefan Kiszko, who was wrongly convicted
- Murder of Carol Wilkinson (1977) which lead to the wrongful conviction of Anthony Steel, which was overturned in 2003. Some investigators have linked the killing to the Yorkshire Ripper
- Chapeltown riots (1975, 1981 and 1987)
- Bradford riots (2001)
- Harehills riots (2001 and 2024)
- Hunt for murderer David Bieber (2003)
- The disappearance of Shannon Mathews (2008)
- The murder of Jo Cox, MP (2016)
- Assault on Syrian refugees, Almondbury Community School (2018)
- "Lesbian Nana" Case (2023)

== Officers killed in the line of duty ==
The Police Roll of Honour Trust and Police Memorial Trust list and commemorate all British police officers killed in the line of duty. Since its establishment in 1984, the Police Memorial Trust has erected 50 memorials nationally to some of those officers.

Since 1900, the following officers of West Yorkshire Police are listed by the Trust as having died during the course of their duties in attempting to prevent, stop or solve a criminal act:

- PC Mark Goodlad, 2011, (Assisting motorist on M1 when a HGV struck him and his marked police vehicle)
- PC Conal Daood Hills, 2006 (fatally injured when his vehicle crashed during a police pursuit)
- PC Sharon Beshenivsky, 2005 (shot dead attending a robbery)
- PC Ian Nigel Broadhurst, 2003 (shot dead by David Bieber)
- PC David Sykes, July 1986, struck by a lorry whilst on the hard shoulder of the M62 near Brighouse
- Sergeant John Richard Speed, 1984 (shot dead; posthumously awarded the Queen's Commendation for Brave Conduct)
- Sergeant Michael Hawcroft, 1981 (stabbed; posthumously awarded the Queen's Commendation for Brave Conduct)
- Inspector Barry John Taylor, 1970 (shot dead; posthumously awarded the Queen's Commendation for Brave Conduct)

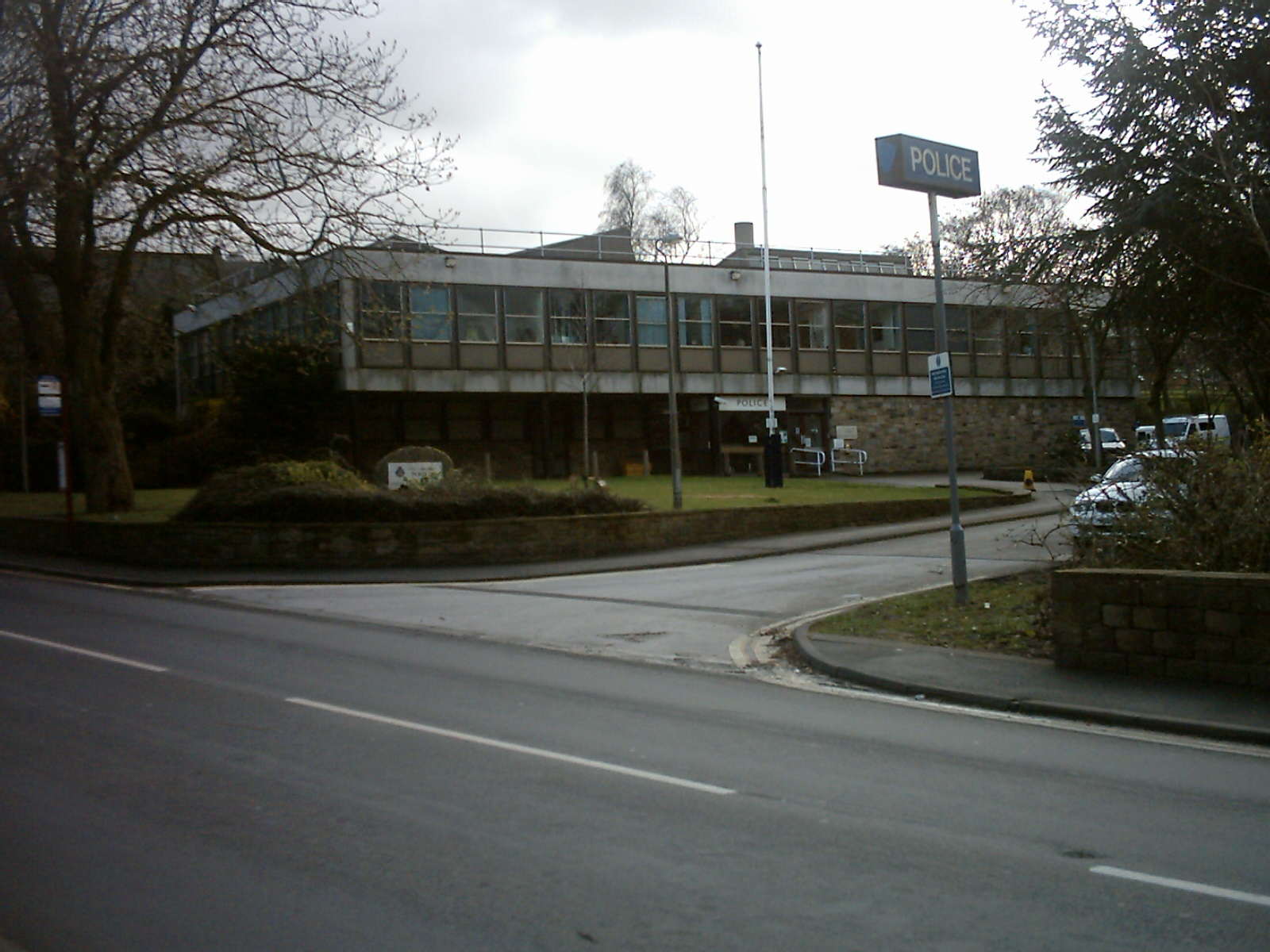
Otley police station

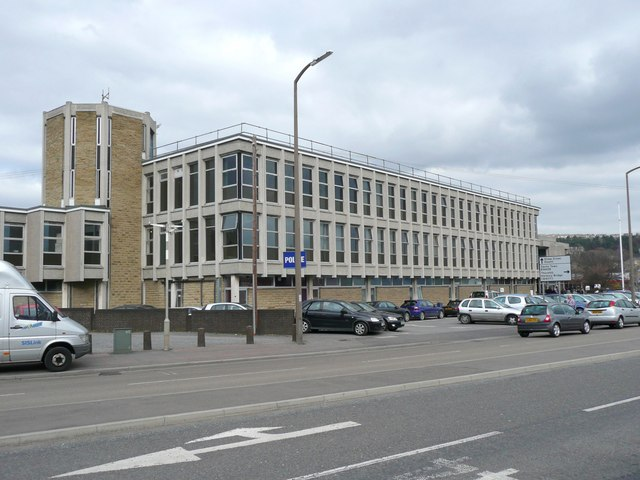
Dewsbury police station

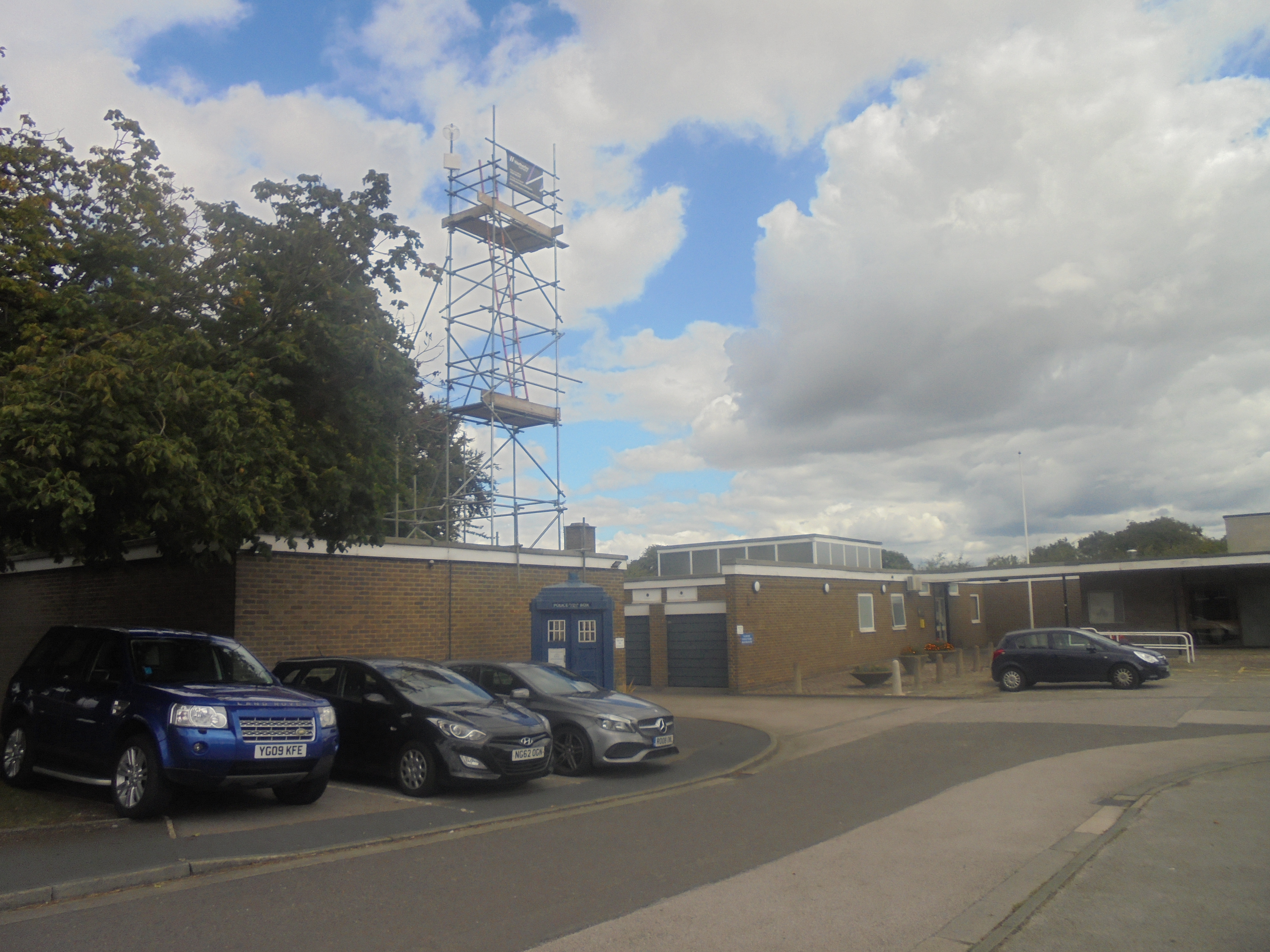
Wetherby police station

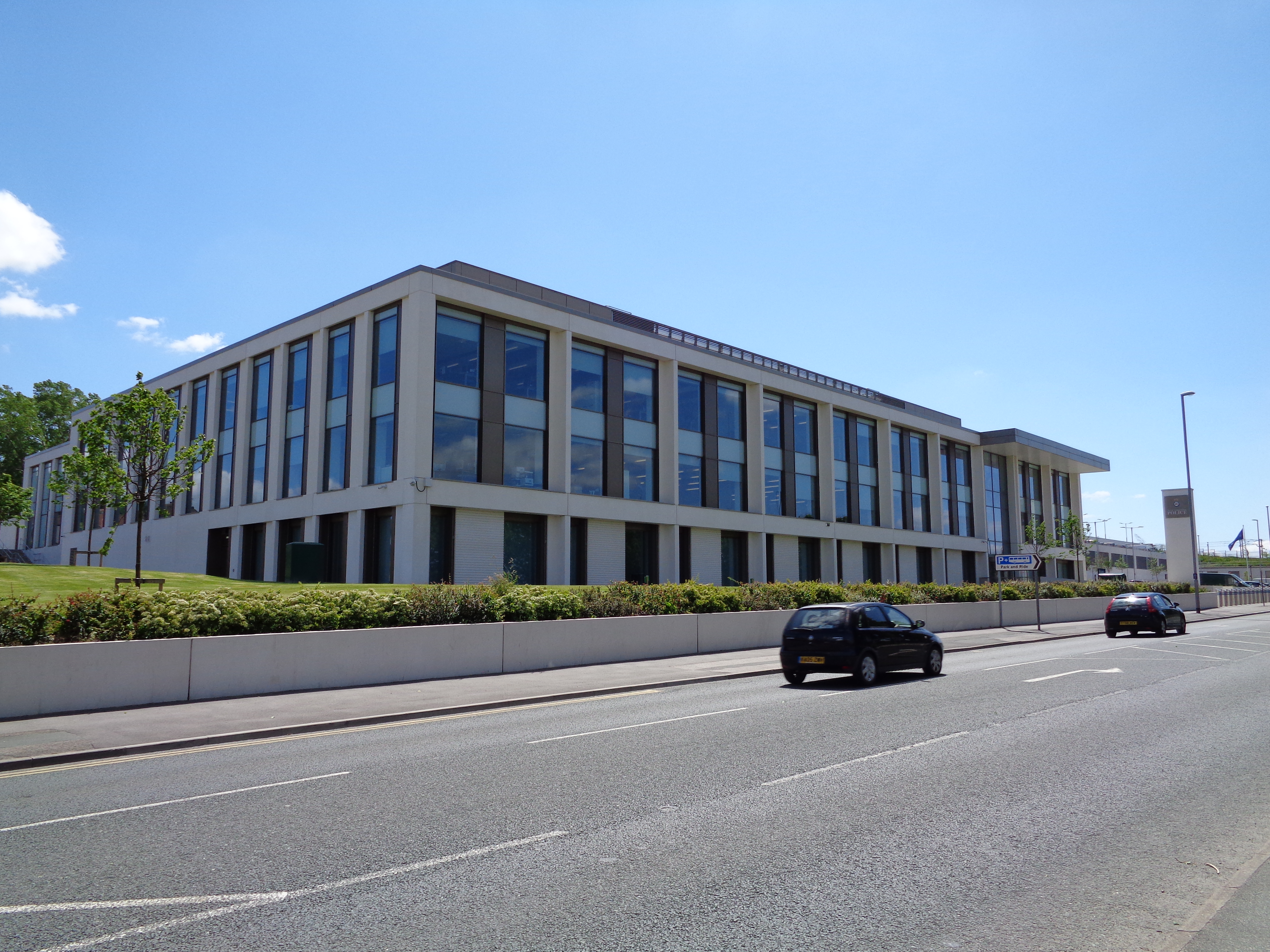
Elland Road police station, Beeston, Leeds

== Arms ==
Coat of arms of West Yorkshire Police
Notes Granted 10 September 1969 Crest On a wreath Argent and Azure, a falcon, wings addorsed, Azure, beaked and legged Argent, supporting with the dexter talon a staff Argent, flying therefrom a banner of the Arms. Escutcheon Or, a portcullis chained Gules; on a chief dancetty Azure three roses of seven petals Argent, barbed and seeded Or. Supporters On either side a griffin regardant Azure, beaked, membered and collared, with a chain reflexed over the back, pendant from the collar four portcullises chained conjoined at their upper ends in cross surmounted by a rose of seven petals Argent, barbed and seeded Or.

== See also ==
- Law enforcement in the United Kingdom
- List of law enforcement agencies in the United Kingdom
- Table of police forces in the United Kingdom
