= Shahnaz Ali =

British woman (born 1961)

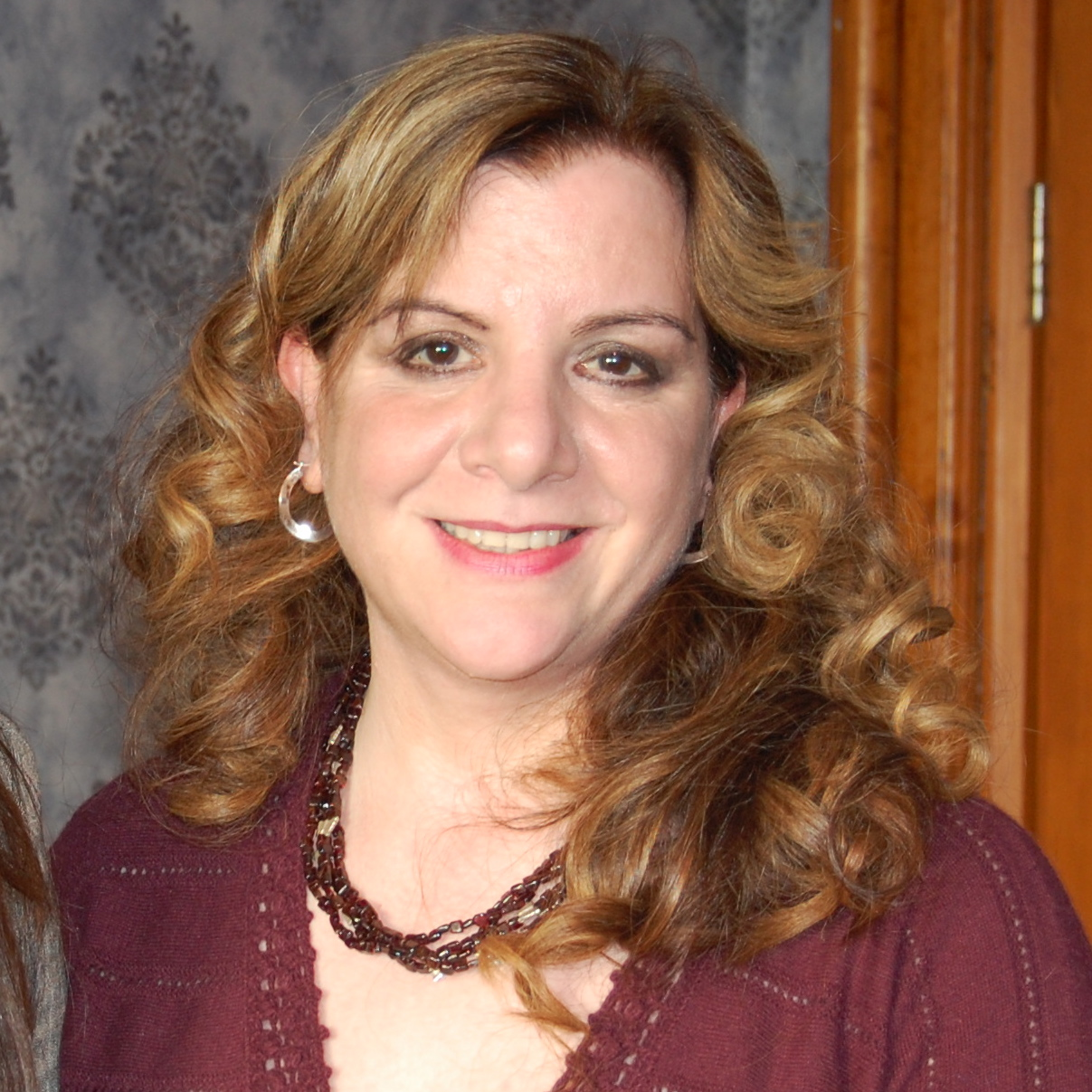
- Shahnaz Ali in 2012
- Born: October 1961 (age 64); Pakistan
- Education: Leeds Metropolitan University, MA Policy Studies (1996)
- Title: Director for Equality, Inclusion and Human Rights (2007 – present)

Shahnaz Ali OBE is a British woman best known for her leadership role in equality, inclusion and human rights in the National Health Service and local government in England. She is also known for her activism, as a young woman, in the anti-racist struggles in Bradford in the 1980s. She was appointed an OBE in the Queen's New Year's Honours list, December 2012 in recognition of her contributions to Equality and Diversity.

== Family and educational background ==
Shahnaz Ali was born in Pakistan and came to England with her family, at the age of 3, in summer of 1965. She grew up in Bradford and attended Leeds Metropolitan University, earning an MA in Policy Studies in 1996.

== Political activism ==
As a teenager growing up in Bradford, Shahnaz Ali was part of a South Asian community that was increasingly subject to hostility and racist attacks from part of the white, indigenous population. She became involved in the United Black Youth League of Bradford and took an active part in its struggles for justice and the right to live without victimisation. See also 1981 England riots. This included resisting the regular bouts of 'Paki-bashing' undertaken in the city by racists, because the police did little to protect the communities under attack. In July 1981, 12 young men from the League were arrested and charged with making explosive substances and a conspiracy to make explosive substances. If found guilty, they would have faced life imprisonment. Shahnaz Ali was detained and interviewed along with the 12 young Asian men, but never charged. The 12 were found not guilty by a verdict of 11–1 in 1982 after a trial lasting 31 days.

Ali was interviewed by the BBC for a documentary it made to mark the 30th anniversary of the Bradford 12 event. She also describes her own involvement in these events in a Podcast interview with Christine Burns.

== Work history ==
From December 2007, Ali was Director of Equality, Inclusion and Human Rights at NHS North West, the strategic health authority for the region. During that time, she has gained national recognition for her strategic leadership on equalities work.

Her work has included publishing a five-year strategy, Narrowing the Gaps, for transformative change of equality outcomes at regional level.

The strategy was in turn based on original in-depth research and analysis, published in October 2008 as "A Landscape of the Region"

Based on that research her programme also involved:

- Developing the UK’s first performance measurement and improvement framework for equality outcomes in the NHS (Equality Performance Improvement Toolkit)
- Pioneering a sustainable approach to long-term equality stakeholder engagement for consultation and involvement in strategic programmes (The Health Equality Stakeholder Engagement programme)
- Creating the UK’s largest and most successful online library and portal for Equality and Diversity evidence and background knowledge (Health Equality Library Portal)
- Championing and leading development of the first competency framework for E&D executive leadership in the public sector
- Establishing a regional Equality and Diversity Leadership Forum, comprising NHS Trust chairs, chief executives and directors of partnership to lead and champion transformative regional strategy
- Embedding equality governance into all major assurance processes at regional level, including the review of commissioning strategic plans, operating plans, reconfiguration plans, World Class Commissioning assurance and the Transforming Community Services project.

Ali and her team developed a philosophy for transformation over the period 2008–12 which they published in a recent peer reviewed journal paper. The paper was followed by the publication of a textbook, 'Making Equality Work' co-authored with Christine Burns and Loren Grant, in September 2013.

== Selected publications ==
- Narrowing the Gaps
- A Landscape of the Region
- Ali, S., Burns, C. and Grant, L. (2012), 'Equality and diversity in the health service: An evidence-led culture change'. J of Psych Issues in Org Culture, 3: 41–60. doi: 10.1002/jpoc.20095
- 'We know diversity work saves cash, but does George Osborne?' Shahnaz Ali. The Guardian, 4 June 2010
- 'A partnership of equals'. Shahnaz Ali. The Guardian, 18 March 2009.
- Craig, G., Adamson, S., Ali, N., Ali, S., Atkins, L., Dadze-Arthur, A., Elliott, C., McNamee, S., Murtuja, B. (2007) Sure Start and Black and Minority Ethnic Populations. National Evaluation Report. Research Report 020. London: Department for Education and Skills.
- ‘Diversity means made to measure, not mass produced.’ Shahnaz Ali. Parliamentary Brief, Vol. 7, December 2000.
- ‘Strength Through Diversity’. Shahnaz Ali, Nursing Times, 3–9 May 2001
- Positive Images. Shahnaz Ali. Health Management Magazine, August 2002
- Shahnaz Ali (2002) 'Racial diversity in the NHS'. Health Service Journal, 30 September 2004.

== Awards ==
- Positive Image Role Model Campaign, 2003. HR in the NHS Conference award.
- Mainstreaming diversity under best HR practice. 2000. Beacon award.
- Responding to HIV/AIDS Through Partnerships. Award for Excellence, 1991. London Association of Authorities.
- Homo Heroes Award for leading the way in ending homophobia and empowering people. The Lesbian and Gay Foundation, 2012.
- Officer of the Order of the British Empire in the 2013 New Year Honours
