= Leroy Cooper =

Leroy Cooper may refer to:

- Leroy Gordon Cooper, Jr. (1927–2004), American aerospace engineer, pilot and astronaut
- Leroy Cooper (musician) (1928–2009), American jazz and R&B saxophonist
- Leroy Cooper (photographer) (died 2023), English photographer
