= Scarman Report =

Report commissioned by the UK Government following the 1981 Brixton riots

The Scarman report was commissioned by the UK Government following the 1981 Brixton riots. Lord Scarman was appointed by then Home Secretary William Whitelaw on 14 April 1981 (two days after the rioting ended) to hold the enquiry into the riots. The Scarman report was published on 25 November 1981.

The terms of reference for the enquiry were "to inquire urgently into the serious disorder in Brixton on 10–12 April 1981 and to report, with the power to make recommendations".

== 1981 Brixton riot ==
The riot took place in Brixton, London on 11 April 1981. At the time when Brixton underwent deep social and economic problems — high unemployment, high crime, poor housing, no amenities — in a predominantly African-Caribbean community. The Metropolitan Police began Operation Swamp 81 at the beginning of April, aimed at reducing street crime, mainly through the heavy use of the so-called sus law, which allowed police to stop and search (and ultimately jail) individuals on the basis of a mere 'suspicion' of wrongdoing. Plain clothes police officers were dispatched into Brixton, and in five days almost 1,000 people were stopped and searched. The riot resulted in 299 injuries to police and 65 injuries to members of the public; over a hundred vehicles were burned, including 56 police vehicles; and almost 150 buildings were damaged, with 28 burned. There were 82 arrests. Reports suggested that up to 5,000 people were involved in the riot.

== Evidence ==
As part of the inquiry the following individuals and groups gave evidence: The Commissioner of Police of the Metropolis (Counsel - Mr J Hazan QC and Mr L Marshall Concern), the Council for Community Relations of Lambeth, London Borough of Lambeth, Brixton local community groups and clubs, the Brixton Legal Defence Group, and the Commission for Racial Equality.

== Findings and recommendations ==
According to the Scarman report, the riots were a spontaneous outburst of built-up resentment sparked by particular incidents. Lord Scarman stated that "complex political, social and economic factors" created a "disposition towards violent protest". The Scarman report highlighted problems of racial disadvantage and inner city decline, warning that "urgent action" was needed to prevent racial disadvantage becoming an "endemic, ineradicable disease threatening the very survival of our society".

Scarman rejected the widespread public notion that the conduct of the police forces were inherently prejudicial. He traced racial prejudice back to single officers below the rank of senior officers and argued for the general integrity and respectability of the police forces. The report details the use of arbitrary roadblocks, stopping and searching of pedestrians and mass detention (943 stops, 118 arrests and 75 charges). Operation Swamp 81 was conducted by the police without any consultation with the community or the home-beat officers. Liaison arrangements between police, community and local authority had collapsed before the riots and according to the Scarman report, the local community mistrusted the police and their methods of policing. Scarman recommended changes in training and law enforcement, and the recruitment of more ethnic minorities into the police force. According to the report "institutional racism" did not exist, but positive discrimination to tackle racial disadvantage was "a price worth paying".

== Reception ==
The theme of the Scarman Report was broadly welcomed, accepted and endorsed by politicians, police commissioners, the press and community relations officials. Some of the report's recommendations were implemented. "Hard policing" continued and new measures were taken to create greater public trust and confidence in official institutions. Multi-agency and "soft" policing emerged through community consultation, youth and "race relations" services. However, in 1999, the Macpherson Report stated that many of the Scarman Report recommendations had been ignored and that, in fact, the Metropolitan Police was "institutionally racist".

The Scarman Report pushed the issue of law and order, and specifically policing, onto the mainstream agenda. The debate in the House of Parliament to mark the publication of the Scarman Report on the 26 November 1981 had as its theme "law and order" and the then leader of the Liberal Party, David Steel, argued that "urgent action" to prevent a drift into lawlessness was necessary. A subsequent debate in March 1982 referenced the events of 1981 and focused on the impact of street violence, crime, decaying urban conditions, and the danger of "more violence to come" if changes in both police tactics and social policy were not swiftly introduced. While both the Conservative and Labour speakers in the parliamentary debate on the riots accepted the need to support the police, substantial disagreement centred on the issue of what role social deprivation and unemployment had in bringing young people to protest violently on the streets.

As a consequence of the Scarman Report a new code for police behaviour was put forward in the Police and Criminal Evidence Act 1984; and the act also created an independent Police Complaints Authority, established in 1985, to attempt to restore public confidence in the police.

== "Community relations" and "institutional racism" ==
Scarman reported a shift from a concern about "race relations" to "community relations". According to Paul Rich, Lord Scarman's views expressed in the Scarman Report most closely resembled that of the mid-Victorian era. Scarman was concerned with the "plight" of the ethnic communities in UK inner cities and their relationship with the rest of the national "community". He concluded that it was essential that "people are encouraged to secure a stake in, feel a pride in, and have a sense of responsibility for their own area". While the importance of community involvement in policing was recognised, the Scarman report pointed to "community redevelopment and planning" as the main area of concern. Scarman called for a policy of "direct coordinated attack on racial disadvantage".

The Scarman Report sought to locate the riots in the social, economic and political context of the acute deprivation in Brixton at the time. Lord Scarman identified the causes of the riots in the pathology of the Caribbean family, in the question of bilingualism amongst Asian children and in the undefined problem of policing a multi-racial society. In doing so Scarman highlighted what Robert Beckford has termed a "pathological image of Black youth". According to the report:

"Without close parental support, with no job to go to, and with few recreational facilities available the young Black person makes his life the streets and the seedy, commercially-run clubs of Brixton. There he meets criminals, who appear to have no difficulty obtaining the benefits of a materialist society."

The Scarman Report does not apportion blame to the police. While the report acknowledges that "ill considered, immature and racially prejudiced actions of some officers" contributed to the riots Lord Scarman only acknowledges "unwitting discrimination against Black people". The report concludes that "The allegation that the police are the oppressive arm of a racist state not only display a complete ignorance of the constitutional arrangements of controlling the police, it is an injustice to the senior officers of the force." In his recommendations Scarman accepts that "hard" policing, such as stop and search operations, would be necessary in the future in areas characterised by severe social problems. Hence the Scarman Report seeks to establish how policing could be enforced without provoking further outbreaks of disorder.

== Inquiry staff ==
- Lord Scarman
- Philip Mawer (Secretary)
- Nicholas Montgomery Pott (Assistant Secretary)
- Ted McCormick and Melissa Grant (UK Home Office)
- Robin Auld QC, Mr JGM Laws and Mr L Crawford (Counsel for the Inquiry)

== See also ==
- 1980 St. Pauls riot
- 1981 Handsworth riots
- Chapeltown riots (1981)
- Toxteth riots
- Brixton riot (1985)
- Brixton riot (1995)
