= Louise Da-Cocodia =

British anti-racism campaigner (1934–2008)

Louise Da-Cocodia MBE, BEM, JP
- Born: 9 November 1934; St. Catherine, Jamaica
- Died: 13 March 2008 (aged 73); Manchester, England
- Occupations: Registered nurse, anti-racism campaigner

Louise Da-Cocodia MBE, BEM, JP (9 November 1934 – 13 March 2008) was a British anti-racism campaigner and former Deputy Lord Lieutenant of Manchester.

== Biography ==
Born in Saint Catherine, Jamaica, Louise Da-Cocodia moved to Britain in 1955 to train as a nurse, invited as part of a government overseas recruitment drive to staff the newly formed National Health Service. As a nurse-in-training, she often encountered racism from colleagues and patients. In 1958, Louise Da-Cocodia qualified as a Staff Registered Nurse, and began a nursing career spanning 31 years.

In 1966 she was appointed as Assistant Superintendent of District Nurses, the first Black senior nursing officer in Manchester. Even as a manager she experienced racist remarks from colleagues: "Those black so and so’s coming here and giving us orders!" These experiences of prejudice inspired Louise to dedicate herself to tackling race equality issues: "deep in my mind is my commitment to bridge the gap which has led to the blacks being treated as inferior."

In the 1960s and 1970s, she served on regional Race Relations Board committees (later known as the Commission for Racial Equality, handling complaints brought under new anti-discrimination laws such as the Race Relations Act 1965. In 1981 she helped transport victims of the Moss Side riot to hospital, and later sat on the Hytner inquiry panel investigating the causes of the unrest. In 1984 she published a paper in the International Journal of Social Psychiatry exploring the effects of racism in nursing.

From 1984, she served three terms as Chair of the West Indian Organisation Co-ordinating Committee.

Da-Cocodia undertook a number of community voluntary roles, both at a grassroots community level – where she was affectionately known as "Mrs D" – and at a more formal level by serving on a number of governing boards and committees, including Manchester Health Authority, Voluntary Action Manchester, and Manchester Metropolitan University. She also a lay inspector at the Crown Prosecution Service, and also a Justice of the Peace. In 1990 she was nominated to the Manchester Magistrates' Bench, where she served for 14 years. In 1999 she was appointed Deputy Lieutenant of Manchester.

Da-Cocodia strove to promote equality of opportunity for Manchester's inner-city residents in housing, education and employment, stating that she was inspired by an aim "…to help young Black people understand that this is their home, this is the society they live in, and that they have a part to play in developing it. Young Black people need role models around, not necessarily high profile ones…". She co-founded and steered a number of community enterprise schemes, including the Cariocca Education Trust and Arawak Walton Housing Association. She was also a founder member of Moss Side and Hulme Women's Action Forum, the Agency for Economic Development in Manchester.

== Awards ==
In 1989 she was awarded an honorary Master's degree by the Victoria University of Manchester for services to nursing and the community. In 1992, she received the Manchester Race Award for improving race relations in the city. In the 1992 Birthday Honours she was awarded the British Empire Medal for her contribution to Greater Manchester’s West Indians' Organisation's Co-ordinating Committee. In 2005 she was appointed an MBE for services to the people of Manchester.

== Legacy ==
Da-Cocodia's legacy lives on through the community organisations she help to found. In 2008, Carrioca Enterprises renamed its education arm the Louise Da-Cocodia Education Trust and it continues to build on her efforts to improve schooling opportunities for young people in particularly those of Afro-Caribbean heritage. In 2011, to honour its founder member and first chair, Arawak Walton Housing Association named a new housing development in Trafford as "Louise DaCocodia Court". She was also an advisor on the Moss Side and Hulme Task Force, and a member of the General Synod of the Church of England and a lay canon.

Da-Cocodia was shortlisted in 2015 for the WoManchester Statue. Although Emmeline Pankhurst was decisively selected, Da-Cocodia's anti-racism work was brought to the attention of a new generation. The statue now sits in St Peter's Square, Manchester. First in the Fight (authors Helen Antrobus and Andrew Simcock, 2019, ISBN 978-1-84547-252-8) dedicates a chapter to Louise Da-Cocodia along with the other nineteen women considered for the statue.
