= Mayall Road =

Road in south London

Coordinates: 51°27′29″N 0°6′26″W

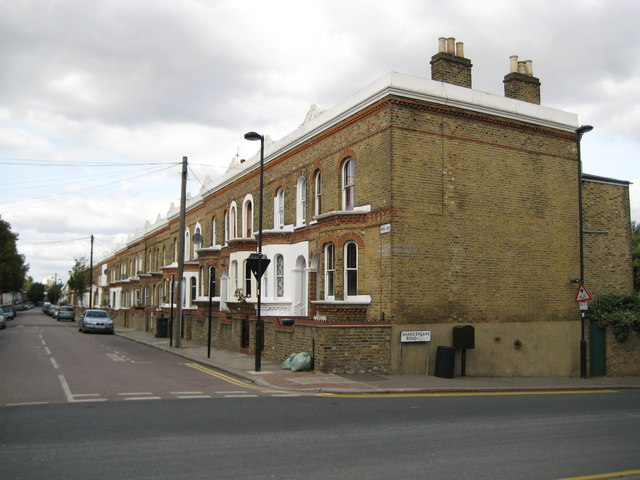
Mayall Road

Mayall Road is a road in Herne Hill and Brixton. It runs parallel to Railton Road and the area between them was known in the 1970s as the Front Line - an area of troubled race relations and conflict with the police.

A street party is held there every year during the August bank holiday.

== Notable residents ==
- Darcus Howe

== See also ==
- 1981 Brixton riot
