= God's Cop =

God's Cop may refer to:

- James Anderton, a former chief constable of the county of Greater Manchester, England, sometimes referred to as God's Cop
- "God's Cop", a song by Happy Mondays from their 1990 album Pills 'n' Thrills and Bellyaches
