= Harehills riot =

Harehills riot may refer to:

- 2001 Harehills riot
- 2024 Harehills riot
