= Sus law =

Stop and search law in England and Wales

In England and Wales, the sus law (from "suspected person") was a stop and search law that permitted a police officer to stop, search and potentially arrest people on suspicion of them being in breach of section 4 of the Vagrancy Act 1824. According to a 2018 study in the British Journal of Criminology, stop and search had a marginal impact on crime in the UK.

== 1824 legislation ==
The power to act on suspicion was found in part of section 4 of the Vagrancy Act 1824, which provided that:

[E]very suspected person or reputed thief, frequenting any river, canal, or navigable stream, dock, or basin, or any quay, wharf, or warehouse near or adjoining thereto, or any street, highway, or avenue leading thereto, or any place of public resort, or any avenue leading thereto, or any street, or any highway or any place adjacent to a street or highway; with intent to commit an arrestable offence [...] shall be deemed a rogue and vagabond[.]

— section 4, Vagrancy Act 1824

Upon conviction, a person arrested under the law could be imprisoned for up to three months. This effectively permitted the police to stop and search, and even arrest, anyone found in a public place if they suspected that they intended to commit an offence.

In order to bring a prosecution under the act, the police had to prove that the defendant had committed two acts:

- the first, that established them as a "suspected person" (by acting suspiciously), and
- the second, that provided intent to commit an arrestable offence.

Two witnesses were required to substantiate the charge, which were usually two police officers patrolling together.

=== 1970s and 1980s ===
The law caused much discontent among certain sections of the population, particularly black and ethnic minorities, against whom the law was particularly targeted by the police. The sus law had attracted considerable controversy prior to the early 1980s race riots (in St Pauls, Bristol, in 1980, and in Brixton, London; Toxteth, Liverpool; Handsworth, Birmingham; and Chapeltown, Leeds in 1981).

This led to campaigns against the law including the "Scrap Sus" campaign led by Mavis Best and Paul Boateng.

When questioned on the topic in 1980, Metropolitan Police Commissioner Sir David McNee stated that the reason for its disproportionate use on black people was because they were "over-represented in offences of robbery and other violent theft".

In 1980, the House of Commons' Sub-Committee on Race Relations and Immigration began hearings into the law. In the case of the race riots, the alleged abusive use of the sus law was believed to be a contributory factor to those events. The sus law was repealed on 27 August 1981, on the advice of the 1979 Royal Commission on Criminal Procedure, when the Criminal Attempts Act 1981 received Royal Assent.

== 2007 legislation ==
Subsequent British legislation that makes provision for the police to act on the basis of suspicion alone has been denounced as "another sus law" by opponents of proposals to grant increased "stop and question" powers to police officers in England and Wales.

In 2007, then-Northern Ireland minister Peter Hain said he wanted to see the details of the policy before making any judgement, saying on BBC One's Sunday AM: "We cannot have a reincarnation of the old 'sus' laws under which mostly black people, ethnic minorities, were literally stopped on sight and that created a really bad atmosphere and an erosion of civil liberties."

In January 2008, David Cameron, at the time Conservative leader of the opposition, announced that he would, if elected, seek to return similar powers to the police. Under Conservative proposals, police sergeants would be able to authorise the use of stop and search of pedestrians and vehicles in a specific area for up to six hours, or 48 hours if permission was granted by a senior officer. Gordon Brown, then-Labour prime minister, announced in response that he would seek to remove the lengthy forms that are currently required for 'stop and searches'.

== See also ==
- Carding (police policy)
- Terry stop
- Law enforcement in the United Kingdom
