= Mavis Best =

British social activist (1939–2022)

Mavis Best MBE
- Born: 11 July 1939 (age 87); Clarendon, Jamaica
- Died: 14 November 2022 (aged 84); Charlton, London, England
- Education: Goldsmiths, University of London
- Occupation: Social activist

Mavis Merlina Stephenson Best, née Clarke, MBE (11 July 1939 – 14 November 2022) was a grassroots social activist who worked for the civil rights of Black people in the UK. She led a successful campaign to overturn the so-called Sus law but was also active in many local church and community projects to improve the lives of Black people.

== Life and career ==
Mavis Best was born into a farming family in Clarendon, Jamaica on 11 July 1939. In 1961, in her early 20s, she moved to London to join her three siblings, as part of the Windrush generation. She settled in Peckham, south London. Best trained as a community development worker in the mid-1970s at Goldsmiths College, University of London. A visiting South African lecturer at Goldsmiths, Basil Manning, noticed her and thought she would make a good leader of a campaign.

At that time, the police, using the Vagrancy Act 1824, were disproportionately apprehending and searching Black people as young as 12 and mostly male, suspecting them of the “intent to commit an arrestable offence”. Young people were often detained for days without their families knowledge, and often ended up in prison. Best and other Lewisham women would go to the relevant police station and demand the young people be allowed home.

Best then led a campaign against the Sus law, called "Scrap the Sus". She organised and attended demonstrations, produced flyers, ran stalls at local events, scanned the local newspapers and demanded corrections to stories that misrepresented the Black community. Best also organised community attendance at court hearings and found witnesses who could contradict police evidence. Best also contacted Paul Boateng, then aged 28 and one of the few Black lawyers in London, and a future Home Secretary and Labour peer. He became involved in the campaign. At this time, while pressing for change, Best was raising three children on her own and had little money. After three years of the campaign, an all-party home affairs committee was set up and, in August 1981, section 4 of the Vagrancy Act 1824 was repealed.

Best continued with her activism and community work. After the New Cross house fire, she was in the group set up by Aggrey Burke to provide counselling to families who had lost relatives in the fire. She participated in the Black People's Day of Action in March 1981 along with Boateng and 20,000 other people who marched to Fleet Street, then known for journalism and newspaper printing. Best worked for the North Lewisham Project setting up a supplementary school for under achieving British African-Caribbean children in schools in the Deptford area. She worked as a community development worker for Camden Social Services. She was charged by Neil Kinnock with developing ideas on race and health. Best was the Chair of the Maternity Alliance (superseded by Maternity Action), an organisation concerned with childbirth and women's rights. Best was involved in starting the Saturday Achievement Project, was a trustee of the Simba Family Project (now dissolved), was a school governor, worked with the Anti-Racist Alliance and campaigned for justice for those, including Rohit Duggal, Rolan Adams and Stephen Lawrence, who were killed in racist attacks. She was a member of the panel reviewing the implementation of recommendations in the Macpherson Report.

In 1998, Best became a Labour councillor in Greenwich. In the same year, Boateng became a minister at the Home Office. He appointed Best to the national committee overseeing community development trusts. In 2002, Best set up the Greenwich African Caribbean Organisation (GACO) with fellow councillor Ann-Marie Cousins.

Best was appointed an MBE in the 2002 New Year Honours, when she was youth affairs officer for the West Indian Standing Conference, for services to equal opportunities. Best was appointed an Alderwoman of the Royal Borough of Greenwich in 2021. In 2014, Best had a stroke and died on 14 November 2022 in a care home close to her family in Charlton, London.

== Legacy ==
Best is included in the Black Power Women of Brixton Walk. She was selected as an icon under the Brewers Black Icons project. She was also included in the list of 100 Black Women who have made a mark. Her granddaughter described her grandmother as a "compassionate warrior". Best was also included in the list of the greatest Black British women of all time.
