= 1975 Chapeltown riot =

Riot in the UK

Spencer Place, Leeds

The 1975 Chapeltown riot occurred on 5 November 1975 in the Leeds district of Chapeltown in West Yorkshire, England. Approximately 100 young black people threw brick at police who were patrolling nearby Spencer Place. During the unrest five police officers were injured, two seriously, and several police cars were damaged. The young people were motivated to attack the police, since their bonfire in the same location the previous year, had been stopped by both police and the fire service. This act was viewed by some of the young people as a retaliatory act in the face of a background of police oppression of black communities in the city.

The event was not nationally reported, since, according to researcher Max Farrar, Leeds was at that time "beyond the reach of most white metropolitan journalists".

There were further riots in Chapeltown in 1981 and 1987, and rioting in nearby Harehills in 2001.

== See also ==
- 1981 Chapeltown riot
- 1987 Chapeltown riot
- Harehills riot
- West Yorkshire Police
- List of race riots
