= 2024 Harehills riot =

Riot in Leeds, England

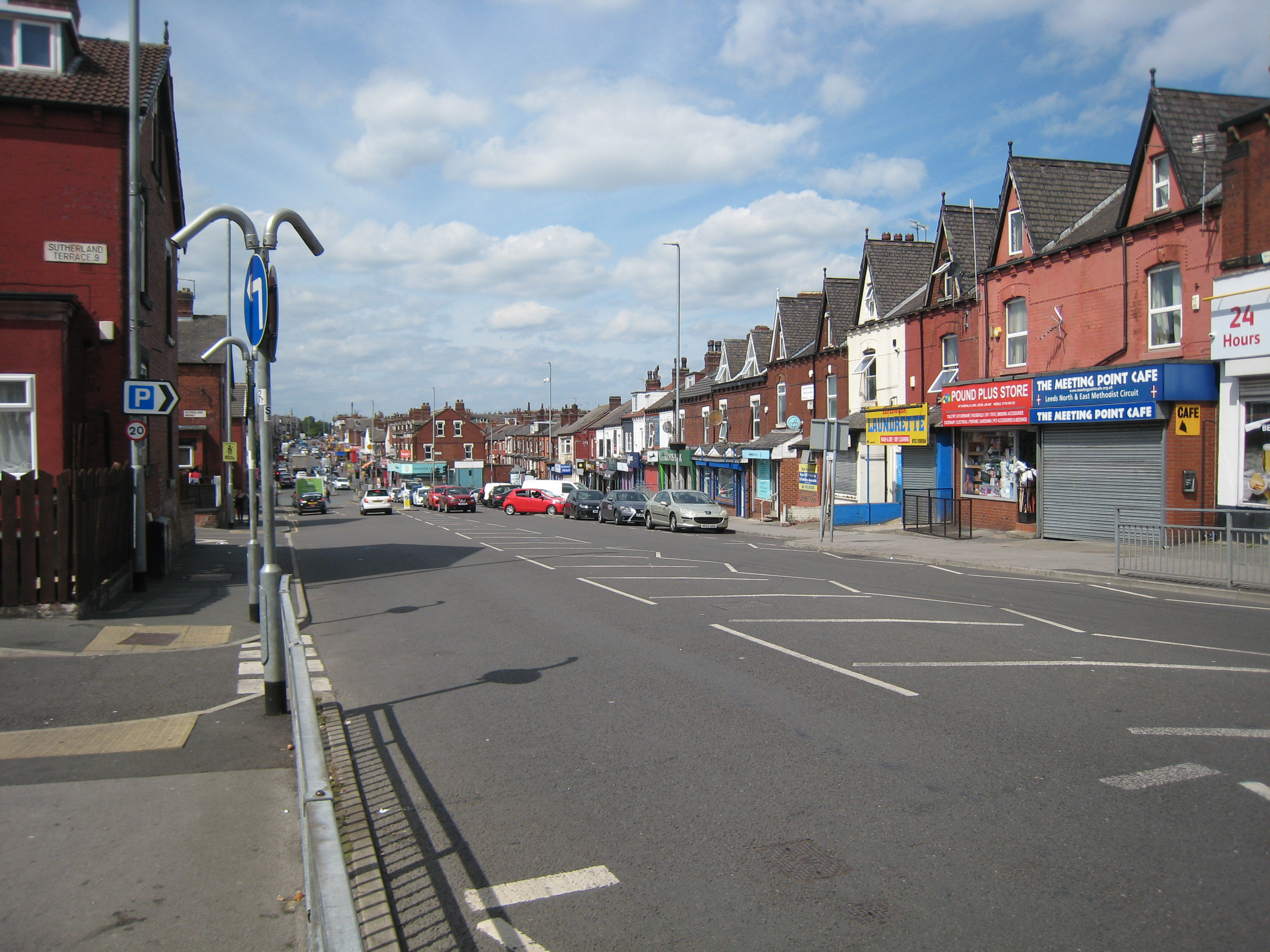
- Harehills Lane, where the height of the riot took place, pictured in August 2022
- Date: 18 July 2024; 2 years ago
- Location: Harehills, Leeds, West Yorkshire
- Caused by: Dispute over four children being taken into care by social services Anti-police sentiment
- Methods: Rioting, arson, assault
- Result: Children were returned to the family

Parties
Local residents of Harehills	West Yorkshire Police

On 18 July 2024, a riot took place in the Harehills area of Leeds, West Yorkshire, England.

The incident was triggered by a dispute over four children of a Romani family being taken into care by social services and police. The situation escalated as residents, angry and filming the police, gathered, forcing the police to retreat. The unrest involved violent confrontations between local residents and police officers, resulting in the overturning of a police car, the torching of a double-decker bus, a bonfire of debris blocking a main road and widespread disorder in the streets.

It was widely claimed on social media that the agitators were of Muslim background, predominantly from the Pakistani community that lives in the area, but reliable sources point out that the incident originated in the Romani community and the rioters came from a variety of backgrounds, including those of Pakistani origin.

The first arrests followed within days of the riot, and the first prison sentences for those involved were handed out in October 2024. By April 2025, 74 arrests had been made, 24 people charged with offences relating to the disorder, nine people had been jailed and four juveniles had received non-custodial sentences.

== Background ==
Harehills is a diverse working class suburb of Leeds, with significant populations of Romani and Pakistani residents. In 2020, it was described as the second most socio-economically deprived area in Leeds.

Earlier in 2024, Leeds Children’s Services had presented claims to family court that a baby had been injured, and that the family might attempt to take the children out of the country. The judge ruled that the children should be taken into care to prevent this, and placed with extended family in order to keep the children together. The removal and placement was criticised by the barrister for the Children and Family Court Advisory and Support Service, claiming that inadequate time was allowed for them to visit and assess safety issues.

Harehills has seen civil unrest before with a riot in the same area in 2001 after police were accused of being "heavy handed" in their arrest of an Asian man over a driving offence. The community is considered to be diverse, and where Leeds' Roma community is mostly based, described by a resident as: "Romanian, Gypsy, Pakistani, Asian – this is what it means to be from Harehills".

== Incident ==
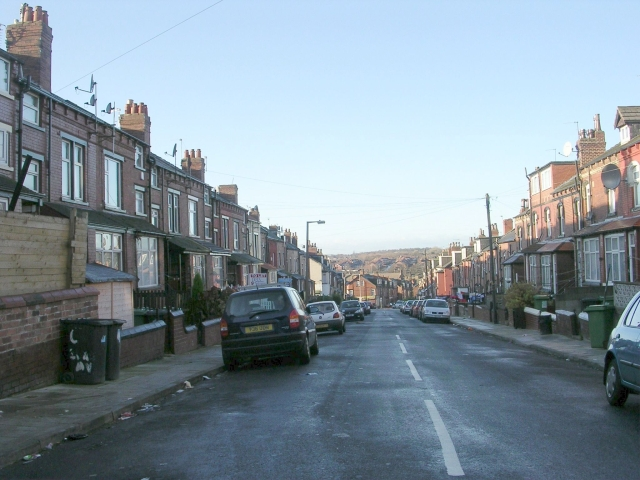
The incident started on Luxor Street; some half a mile north of where the violence peaked.

At 5 pm on 18 July 2024, West Yorkshire police responded to a residential street disturbance in the Gipton and Harehills ward sparked by a dispute over four children from a residential family, being taken into care by social services. The spark has been described as a "family incident" and a "child protection matter" handled by social workers. According to The Guardian, as police attempted to manage the situation, more people began to gather at the scene, with some residents becoming angry and filming the police, leading to increased tension and the eventual outbreak of violence.

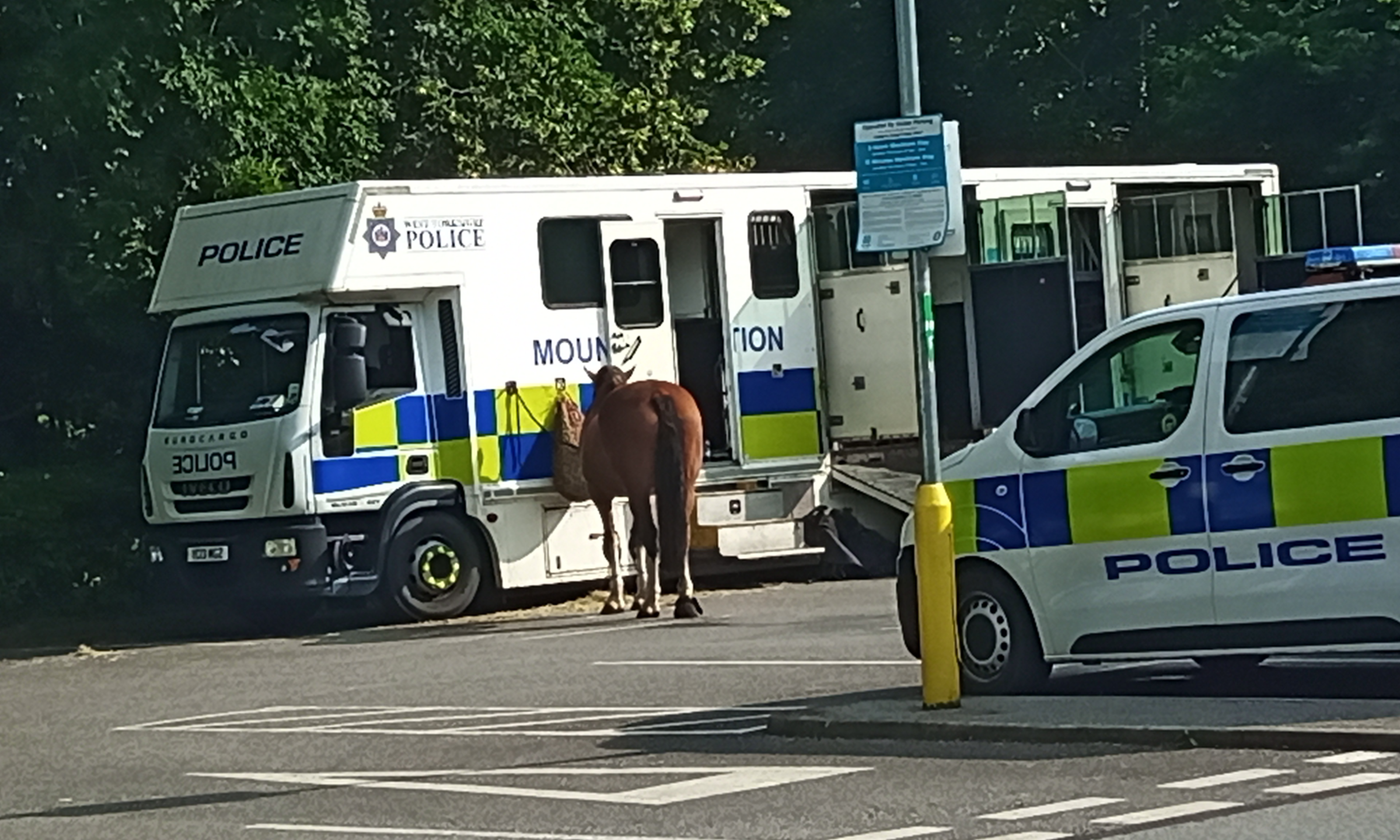
West Yorkshire Police temporary command post set up close by in nearby Oakwood

A crowd began attacking a police car after witnessing an altercation between social services, the police and a local family. Footage shared on social media showed individuals using scooters, pushchairs, bikes, and bats to assault the vehicle. The police car's windows were broken, the car was overturned, and additional officers were dispatched to the area to attempt to control the situation. Videos and images of the riot quickly spread on platforms like X and TikTok, drawing widespread attention to the incident. Cars in the area were reportedly set alight, and two First Leeds buses were attacked, one of which was set on fire. Videos posted on social media from the riot show people speaking Romanian while overturning a police car. iNews reported that police were 'outnumbered' and ran away from the riot and disorder. A number of locals perceived a lack of emergency personnel at the scene for most of the night.

Throughout the evening, Gipton and Harehills Councillor Mothin Ali was present at the scene of the riot attempting to calm the violent situation. Videos were posted during the night, on TikTok and X, of him stopping those present from throwing wooden pallets and wheelie bins onto the fire.

== Reactions ==
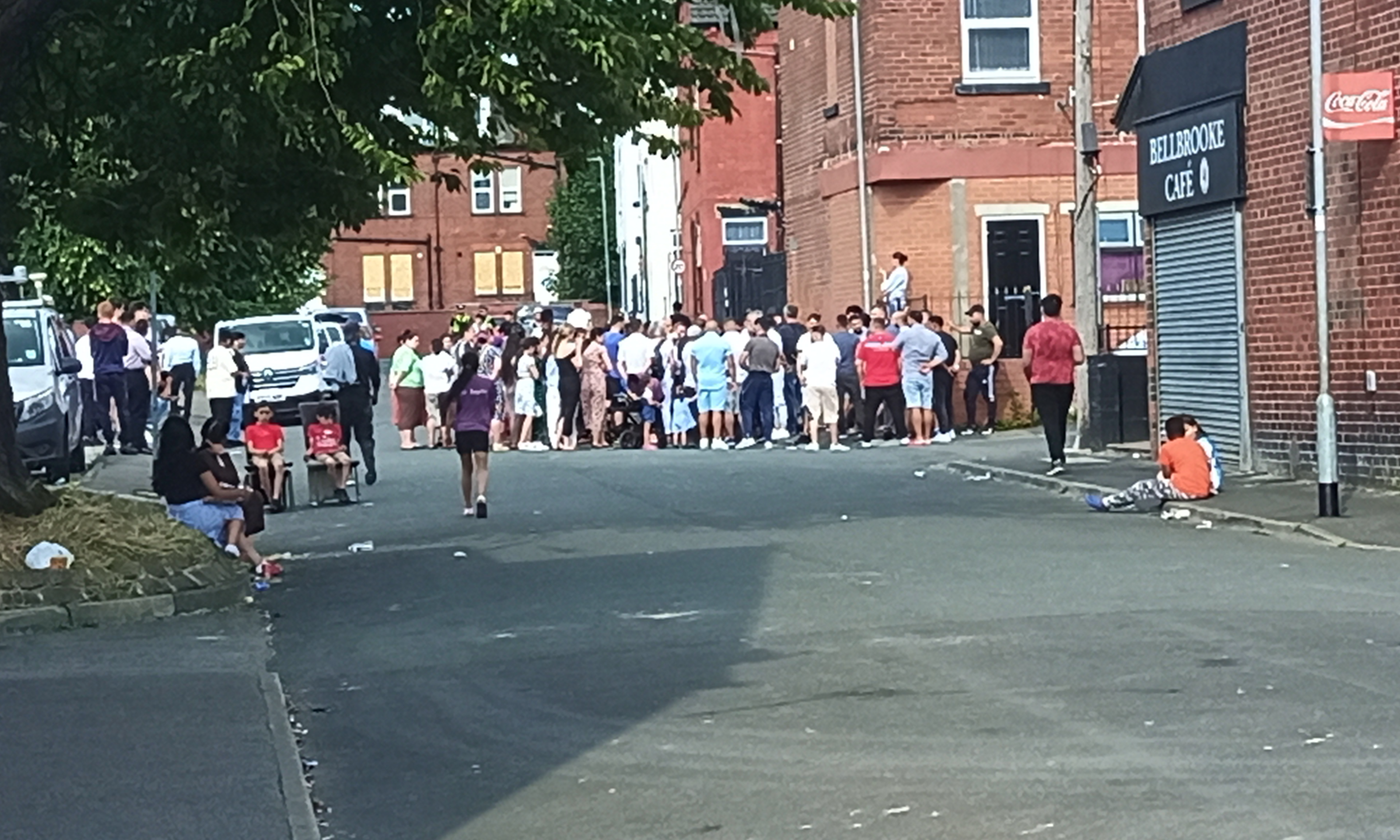
A gathering of residents the day after on Bellbrooke Street

Salma Arif, Councillor from Gipton and Harehills, posted on X platform on Thursday standing along with a police inspector, urging people to stay at home, with the BBC noting Arif's comment on the "an ongoing situation currently in Harehills... We are asking everybody in the area please stay at home at this moment in time."

Mayor Tracy Brabin of West Yorkshire, said she had been "reassured no one has been seriously injured but suggest those who are using this to inflame community tensions to think again." During a press conference on 19 July, Brabin discussed meeting with "key partners," during which they developed a plan to ensure the safety of Harehills, with "imams and the faith leaders [...] getting the message out there that we need to stay calm and ensure we don't have what we saw, which was frightening, horrible and unacceptable."

Home Secretary Yvette Cooper, the Member of Parliament from Pontefract, Castleford and Knottingley of West Yorkshire, expressed her dismay stating that she was "appalled at the shocking scenes", and that "disorder of this nature has no place in our society". Richard Burgon, the Member of Parliament for Leeds East, posted on X: "I am on my way back to Leeds from Parliament and am in touch with the police and concerned residents about the on-going incident in Harehills." The MP continued, "The police say no injuries have been reported but are advising people to avoid the area at the moment if possible."

Muslim Green councillor Mothin Ali, who was at the scene trying to calm the situation and urging the police to speak in Urdu, faced online smears and received death threats after the news coverage. The Independent described how Ali was a "hero", who formed a "human shield" to stop people adding further combustible material to fires.

== Aftermath ==
In response to the riot, the city's council commenced an "urgent review" concerning its management of child care cases. This decision came after discussions with members of the Gypsy Roma community, who accused the authorities of "systemic racism and discrimination" in managing the case involving a family from their community. On Friday, 19 July 2024, some members of the community held a vigil and chanted "please bring the kids back". The children's parents declared a hunger strike until their four children were returned. On 23 July, the children were returned to the family.

Nine Romanian citizens were detained following the street riot on 18 July, according to the Ministry of Foreign Affairs of Romania on 21 July. Of these, eight were later released. On 20 July 2024, the police announced that they had charged one Romanian man aged 37 with violent disorder and arson that endangered life. The Romanian Consulate in Manchester stated they were maintaining communication with the family affected by child custody measures, as well as with British authorities.

On 3 August, the BBC reported that police arrested 27 people in connection with the riot. Assistant Chief Constable Pat Twiggs expressed gratitude to those who provided information and indicated more arrests were expected. On 1 October 2024, four men were sentenced for the arson of a bus in the rioting, receiving sentences of between three and six years in prison. It was heard in court that the damage was around £500,000, and the driver had not worked since due to trauma. By April 2025, the police stated that 74 people had been arrested in connection with the rioting, 24 people had been charged, nine individuals had been jailed and a further four juvenile offenders had received non-custodial sentences.

== Analysis ==
Journalist Emilia Stankeviciute wrote that "Local contextual factors, such as economic deprivation, can quickly turn minor incidents like this into significant unrest". Right-leaning, libertarian online magazine Spiked argued that due to the reported diversity of the rioters, integration and cultural tensions may have played a role in the unrest.

== See also ==
- List of riots in Leeds
- 2022 Leicester unrest – involving British Hindus and British Muslims
- 2023 Dublin riot – involving White Irish and migrants
- 2024 United Kingdom riots – involving White British, migrants and British Muslims
- 2025 Northern Ireland unrest – involving White, migrants and Romanians
