= Leroy Cooper (photographer) =

Photographer (died 2023)

- Born: 1960s Jamaica
- Died: May 2023
- Occupation: Photographer

Leroy Alphonse Cooper (born 1960 or 1961; died May 2023) was a Jamaican-born photographer, active in Toxteth, Liverpool, England, whose arrest there in 1981 sparked the Toxteth riots.

== Early life ==
Cooper was born in 1960 or 1961 in Jamaica, and emigrated with his parents to Liverpool as a baby.

== Arrests and convictions ==
Cooper's arrest on 3 July 1981, when he was a photography student in Liverpool, sparked the first Toxteth riot, which occurred while he was in detention. He was prosecuted, with the most serious charge being causing grievous bodily harm, and held on remand in HMP Walton and then at Risley for six to eight weeks, then pleaded guilty to assaulting three police officers causing actual bodily harm, in a trial at Liverpool Crown Court in November 1981. As a result, he spent nine months in borstal. In 2011, he stated that he made the guilty plea to avoid "a sentence of three to five years". He also described how his conviction led to his "blacklisting" for jobs in Liverpool.

He was also sentenced to two years imprisonment in 1983 for wounding with intent, following further assaults on two police officers, one using a tree branch, and for carrying an offensive weapon, all of which he denied. He was again held in HMP Walton.

== Career ==
After release Cooper continued to study photography. His work, comprising over a quarter of a million images, chiefly documents the people and culture of Liverpool. He also worked as a performance poet and as a DJ on Toxteth Community Radio, a pirate station, and was a graffiti artist. One of his acts in the latter capacity was to repaint Toxteth street name signs in the red, yellow and green colours of Rastafari.

Cooper was featured in the 25 November 1985 episode of the BBC Television current affairs programme Panorama, "Voices From The Ghetto", about Toxteth.

A book, Back In The Day Vol. 1, reproducing 44 of his photographs and one of his paintings was published in 2019.

An exhibition of Cooper's work, "A Secret Life of Liverpool", was held at the Unity Theatre, Liverpool in May 2018. At the time of his death the Museum of Liverpool was hosting an exhibition of his work, "Liverpool Through the Lens".

== Death ==
Cooper's body was found at his home on 12 May 2023. He was 62. The cause of death was not immediately established.

== Works ==
- Back In The Day Vol. 1. Capstone Media. 2019. ISBN 978-1-5272-3696-7.
