= 1987 Chapeltown riot =

Riot in Leeds, West Yorkshire, England

The Chapeltown riots of 1987 took place in the Leeds district of Chapeltown in West Yorkshire, England. Widespread rioting in Chapeltown also occurred in 1975 and 1981. During the 1981 riots, rioting took place not only in Chapeltown, but also in London, Birmingham and Liverpool.

The riots of 1987 began on Sunday, 21 June, when a black teenager, 17-year-old Marcus Skellington, was arrested and beaten by police. It is estimated that 70 teenagers participated in smashing shop windows, looting and attacking police officers 22 and 21 June. On 23 June, shops, cars, and windows were burned, bombed and stoned, including a sex shop which was completely burnt down. The burning of the sex shop was particularly significant for two reasons. First, it was not widely supported or wanted by the local community and had been protested prior to the riots. Second, it was believed that the police carried out surveillance of the Hayfield Pub car park for marijuana dealing from above the sex shop, despite the sex shop operating illegally at times.

== See also ==
- 2001 Harehills riot
