= 1981 Brixton riot =

Clashes between police and protesters in London in 1981

Coordinates: 51.45985°N 0.11038°W

- Part of the 1981 England riots
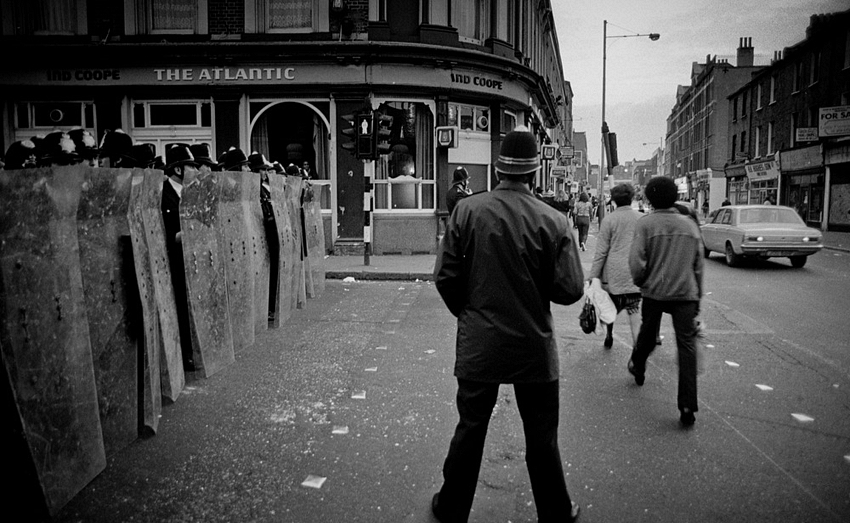
- Police with riot shields form a cordon across Atlantic Road at its junction with Coldharbour Lane, 11 April 1981
- Date: 10–12 April 1981
- Location: Brixton, South London, England
- Methods: Rioting, looting, arson

Casualties and losses
- 279 police officers injured 45 members of the public injured

The 1981 Brixton riot, or Brixton uprising, was a series of clashes between mainly black youths and the Metropolitan Police in Brixton, London, between 10 and 12 April 1981. It resulted from racial discrimination against the local black community by the mainly white police, notably over the police's increased use of stop-and-search in the area, and tensions resulting from the deaths of 13 black teenagers and young adults in the suspicious New Cross house fire that January. The main riot on 11 April, dubbed "Bloody Saturday" by Time magazine, resulted in 279 injuries to police and 45 injuries to members of the public; over a hundred vehicles were burned, including 56 police vehicles; almost 150 buildings were damaged, thirty of which were burnt out, and many shops were looted. There were 82 arrests. Reports suggested that up to 5,000 people were involved. The Brixton riot was followed by the 1981 England riots in July in many other English cities and towns. The Thatcher government commissioned an inquiry, which resulted in the Scarman Report.

== Background ==
Brixton in South London was an area with serious social and economic problems. The United Kingdom was affected by a recession by 1981, but the local African-Caribbean community was suffering particularly high unemployment, poor housing and a higher-than-average crime rate.

In the preceding months there had been growing unease between the police and the inhabitants of Lambeth, the borough of London in which Brixton is located. On 18 January 1981, thirteen black youths died in a fire during a house party in New Cross, in the nearby Borough of Lewisham. Although authorities stated that the fire started inside and was accidental, the public believed it was an arson attack and criticised the police investigation as inadequate. Black activists, including Darcus Howe, organised a march for the "Black People's Day of Action" on 2 March. Accounts of turnout vary from 5,000 to 20,000 to 25,000. The marchers walked 17 miles (27 km) from Deptford to Hyde Park, passing the Houses of Parliament and Fleet Street. While the majority of the march finished in Hyde Park without incident, there was some confrontation with police at Blackfriars. According to Professor Les Back, "while the local press reported the march respectfully, the national papers unloaded the full weight of racial stereotyping." The Evening Standard's front-page headline had displayed a photo of a policeman with a bloody face juxtaposed with Darcus Howe's quote about the march being "A good day". A few weeks later, the police arrested some of the march organisers and charged them with the offence of riot, but they were later acquitted.

In 1980, 30,805 crimes were recorded in the borough of Lambeth, with 10,626 of those taking place in the Brixton division. Between 1976 and 1980, 35% of all crimes in the borough, and 49% of robbery and violent theft offences, occurred in Brixton. The police recognised the rising crime, at the beginning of April, the Metropolitan Police began Operation Swamp 81, a plain clothes operation to reduce crime (named after prime minister Margaret Thatcher's 1978 assertion that the UK "might be rather swamped by people with a different culture") and uniformed patrols were increased in the area. Officers from other Metropolitan police districts and the Special Patrol Group were dispatched to Brixton, and within five days, 943 people were stopped and searched, with 82 arrested, through mass use of what was colloquially known as the "Sus law". This referred to powers under the Vagrancy Act 1824, which allowed police to search and arrest members of the public when it was believed that they were acting suspiciously and not necessarily committing a crime. The African-Caribbean community accused the police of disproportionately using these powers against black people.

== 10–11 April ==
On Friday 10 April, at around 6:10pm, a police constable spotted a black youth named Michael Bailey running towards him, apparently away from three other black youths. Bailey was stopped and found to be badly bleeding, but broke away from the constable. Stopped again on Atlantic Road, Bailey was found to have a four-inch stab wound. He ran into a flat and was helped by a family and the police constable there by putting kitchen roll on his wound. A crowd gathered and, as the police then tried to take the wounded boy to a waiting minicab on Railton Road, the crowd tried to intervene thinking the police did not appear to be providing or seeking the medical help Bailey needed quickly enough. As the minicab pulled away at speed a police car arrived and stopped the cab. When an officer from the police car realised Bailey was wounded he moved him into the back of the police car to take him to hospital more quickly, and bound his wound more tightly to stop the bleeding. A group of 50 youths began to shout for Bailey's release, thinking the police were arresting him. "Look, they're killing him," claimed one. The crowd descended on the police car and pulled him out.

Rumours spread that a youth had been left to die by the police, or that the police looked on as the stabbed youth was lying on the street. More than 200 youths, black and white with predominantly Afro-Caribbean heritage, reportedly turned on the police. The police decided to increase the number of foot patrols in Railton Road, despite the tensions, and carry on with Operation Swamp 81 throughout the night and into the following day.

== 11–12 April ==
It was inaccurately believed by the local community that the stabbed youth died, and that it was a result of police brutality. This fuelled tensions throughout the day as crowds slowly gathered. Tensions first erupted around 4 pm, as two police officers stopped and searched a mini cab in Railton Road. By this time Brixton Road (Brixton High Street) was reportedly filled with angry people and police cars were pelted with bricks. At around 5 pm the tension escalated and the 9 pm BBC News bulletin that evening reported 46 police officers injured, five seriously. Shops were looted on Railton Road, Mayall Road, Leeson Road, Acre Lane and Brixton Road. The looting in Brixton reportedly started at around 6 pm. At 6:15 pm the fire brigade received their first call, as a police van was set on fire by rioters in Railton Road, with the fire brigade being warned "riot in progress". As the fire brigade approached the police cordon, they were waved through without warning, driving down Railton Road towards 300 youths armed with bottles and bricks. The fire brigade met the crowd at the junction between Railton Road and Shakespeare Road and were attacked with stones and bottles.

The police put out emergency calls to police officers across London, asking for assistance. They had no strategy, and only had inadequate helmets and non-fireproof plastic shields to protect themselves with while clearing the streets of rioters. The police reportedly also had difficulties in radio communication. The police proceeded in clearing the Atlantic–Railton–Mayall area by pushing the rioters down the road, forming deep shield walls. The rioters threw bricks, bottles, and petrol bombs. At 5.30 pm the violence further escalated. Non-rioting members of the public attempted to mediate between the police and the rioters, calling for a de-escalation by withdrawing police from the area. The destructive efforts of the rioters peaked at around 8 pm, as the attempts at mediation failed. Two pubs, 26 businesses, schools and other structures were set alight in the riots.

By 9.30 pm, over 1,000 police were sent to Brixton, squeezing out the rioters. By 1 am on 12 April 1981, the area was largely subdued, with no large groups – except the police – on the streets. The fire brigade refused to return until the following morning. Police numbers grew to over 2,500, and by the early hours of Sunday morning the rioting had fizzled out.

== Aftermath ==
During the disturbances, 299 police were injured, along with at least 65 members of the public. 61 private vehicles and 56 police vehicles were destroyed. 28 premises were burned and another 117 damaged and looted. 82 arrests were made. Between 3 and 11 July of that year, there was more unrest fuelled by racial and social discord, at Handsworth in Birmingham, Southall in London, Toxteth in Liverpool, Hyson Green in Nottingham and Moss Side in Manchester. There were also smaller pockets of unrest in Leeds, Leicester, Southampton, Halifax, Bedford, Gloucester, Wolverhampton, Coventry, Bristol, and Edinburgh. Racial tension played a major part in most of these disturbances, although all of the riots took place in areas hit particularly hard by unemployment and recession.

=== Scarman Report ===
The Home Secretary, William Whitelaw, commissioned a public inquiry into the riot headed by Lord Scarman. The Scarman report was published on 25 November 1981. Scarman found unquestionable evidence of the disproportionate and indiscriminate use of 'stop and search' powers by the police against black people. As a consequence, a new code for police behaviour was put forward in the Police and Criminal Evidence Act 1984 and the act also created an independent Police Complaints Authority, established in 1985, to attempt to restore public confidence in the police. Scarman concluded that "complex political, social and economic factors [created a] disposition towards violent protest".

The 1999 Macpherson Report, an investigation into the murder of Stephen Lawrence and the failure of the police to establish sufficient evidence for the prosecution of the charged suspects, found that recommendations of the 1981 Scarman Report had been ignored. The report concluded that the police force was "institutionally racist". This report, which did not cover the events of the Brixton Riots, disagreed with the conclusions made by Scarman. On 25 March 2011, BBC Radio 4 broadcast The Reunion, a programme featuring reminiscences by participants, including police and black Brixton residents.

=== Other rioting ===
On 13 April, Margaret Thatcher dismissed the notion that unemployment and racism lay beneath the Brixton disturbances claiming "Nothing, but nothing, justifies what happened". Unemployment in Brixton stood at 13 per cent, with 25.4 per cent for ethnic minorities. Unemployment among black youths was estimated at 55 per cent. Rejecting increased investment in Britain's inner cities, Thatcher added, "Money cannot buy either trust or racial harmony.". Lambeth London Borough Council leader, Ted Knight, complained that the police presence "amounted to an army of occupation" that provoked the riots; Thatcher responded, "What absolute nonsense and what an appalling remark ... No one should condone violence. No one should condone the events ... They were criminal, criminal.".

Small-scale disturbances continued to simmer throughout the summer. After four nights of rioting in Liverpool during the Toxteth riots, beginning 4 July, there were 150 buildings burnt and 781 police officers injured. CS gas was used for the first time on the British mainland to quell the rioting. On 10 July, there was more rioting in Brixton. It was not until the end of July that the disturbances began to subside. The recommendations of the Scarman Report to tackle the problems of racial disadvantage and inner-city decline were not implemented. Rioting broke out again in the 1985 and 1995 Brixton riots.

== Cultural references ==
=== Music ===
- The Clash's song "The Guns of Brixton" predates the riots but the lyrics depict the feelings of discontent in the area because of the heavy-handedness of the police. The same can be said for the song "White Riot."
- Black Uhuru's song "Youth of Eglington" (1981) was inspired in part by the Brixton riot, and features lyrics referencing Brixton.
- Angelic Upstarts - "Flames of Brixton" (1982) was written in response to the Brixton riot, as directly referenced in its title.
- Eddy Grant's 1982 song "Electric Avenue" refers to the Brixton riot, although there was actually little rioting in Electric Avenue itself.
- Lorna Gee's song "Brixton Rock" (1985) was written in response to both the 1981 and the 1985 Brixton riots. It was the shooting of her sister, Cherry Groce, that led to the 1985 riots happening.
- The 1986 Pet Shop Boys song "Suburbia", telling a story of boredom and (fictional) riots in suburbia, was partially influenced by the Brixton riots of 1981 and 1985, the latter of which was in recent memory when the single was released.
- Songs written later that allude to the Brixton riots include: The Birdhouse, "Brixton's Burnin'" (1988); Steel Pulse, "State of Emergency" (1988); Conflict, "These Colours Don't Run" (1993); Rancid, "Brixton" (1994); Plan B, "Ill Manors" (2012); Linton Kwesi Johnson, "Di Great Insohreckshan"; Chrismic Youth, "Brixton Riot"; Abacush, "Suffera Style (Brixton Riot)"; Sugar Minnot, "Riot inna Brixton".

=== Other media ===
- In the Only Fools and Horses episode, "The Russians Are Coming", it is mentioned by Rodney that Del Boy sold paving slabs to rioters.
- Linton Kwesi Johnson's poems "New Crass Massahkah" and "Di Great Insoreckshan" (1984) were written in response to the Brixton riot.
- Alex Wheatle's novel East of Acre Lane is set in 1981 Brixton and portrays the dissatisfaction felt by the black community that would eventually lead to the Brixton riot.
- The storyline "Rake at the Gates of Hell" in the comic book Hellblazer was partially inspired by the riot.
- Rex Obano's radio play Lover's Rock, broadcast in November 2012 on BBC Radio 3, deals with the events leading up to the Brixton Riots.
- The BBC show "Orphan Black" alludes to the Brixton Riots as the reason Mrs. S. fled England. Mrs. S. tells the main character Sarah that Brixton was burning and shows her a newspaper clipping headlined "Brixton Burning".
- Steve McQueen's series Small Axe (2020) features an episode involving the riots.
- Steve McQueen's documentary series Uprising (2021) includes an episode centred on the April riot.

== See also ==
- Urban riots
- 1980 St Pauls riot
- 1981 Handsworth riots, Birmingham
- 1981 Chapeltown riots, Leeds
- 1981 Toxteth riots, Liverpool
- 1985 Brixton riot
- 1995 Brixton riot
