= 1981 Toxteth riots =

Riots in Toxteth, Liverpool

- Part of the 1981 England riots
- Date: July 1981
- Location: Toxteth, Liverpool
- Methods: Rioting, arson, looting

Casualties and losses
- 1 death 486 to 1,000 police officers injured 500 arrests

The Toxteth riots of July 1981 were a civil disturbance in Toxteth, inner-city Liverpool, which arose in part from long-standing tensions between the local police and the black community. They followed the Brixton riot earlier that year and were one of the many riots which took place across Britain during the spring and summer of 1981.

== Background ==
The Merseyside police force had, at the time, a poor reputation within the black community for stopping and searching young black men in the area, under the "sus" laws, and the heavy-handed arrest of Leroy Alphonse Cooper on Friday 3 July near Granby Street, watched by an angry crowd, led to a disturbance in which three policemen were injured. The existing tensions between police and people had already been noticed by local magistrate, Councillor and Chair of the Merseyside Police Committee, Margaret Simey, who was frequently critical of the hardline tactics used by the then Chief Constable Kenneth Oxford. She said of the rioters "they would be apathetic fools ... if they didn't protest", although she was unprepared for the personal criticism that followed.

With the economy in recession, unemployment in Britain was at a 50-year high in 1981, with Merseyside being one of the worst hit regions for unemployment, and Toxteth in turn being one of the worst hit districts of the city of Liverpool.

== Events ==
Over the weekend that followed, disturbance erupted into full-scale rioting, with pitched battles between police and youths in which petrol bombs and paving stones were thrown. During the violence, milk floats were set on fire and directed at police lines. Rioters were also observed using scaffolding tubes to charge police lines. The Merseyside Police had issued its officers with long protective shields but these proved inadequate in protecting officers from missile attacks and in particular the effects of petrol bombs. The overwhelming majority of officers were not trained either in using the shields or in public order tactics. The sole offensive tactic available to officers, the baton charge, proved increasingly ineffective in driving back the attacking crowds of rioters.

At 02:15 hours on Monday 6 July 1981 Merseyside police officers fired 25–30 CS gas grenades, the first occasion on which these had been used in the UK other than in Northern Ireland. The gas successfully dispersed the crowds. The rioting lasted nine days, during which Merseyside Police said 468 police officers were injured, 500 people were arrested, and at least 70 buildings were damaged so severely by fire that they had to be demolished. Around 100 cars were damaged or destroyed, and there was extensive looting of shops. Later estimates suggested the numbers of injured police officers and destroyed buildings were at least double those of the official figures.

Such was the scale of the rioting in Toxteth that police reinforcements were drafted in from forces across England, including Greater Manchester Police, Lancashire, Cumbria, Birmingham and even as far afield as Devon (well over 200 miles away) to try to control the unrest.

A second wave of rioting began on 27 July 1981 and continued into the early hours of 28 July, with police once again being attacked with missiles and a number of cars being set alight. Twenty-six officers were injured.

However, on this occasion the Merseyside Police responded by driving vans and Land Rovers at high speed into the crowds quickly dispersing them. This tactic had been developed as a riot control technique in Northern Ireland by the Royal Ulster Constabulary and had been employed with success in quelling the Moss Side riots by the Greater Manchester Police earlier that year. A 23-year-old local man, David Moore, died after being struck by a police vehicle trying to clear crowds. Two police officers were charged with his manslaughter but cleared in April 1982.

Dozens of senior citizens were evacuated from the Princes Park Hospital during the riots.

== Aftermath ==
The subsequent Scarman Report (although primarily directed at the Brixton Riot of 1981) recognised that the riots did represent the result of social problems, such as poverty and deprivation.

The Government responded by sending Michael Heseltine, as "Minister for Merseyside", to set up the Merseyside Task Force and launch a series of initiatives, including the Liverpool international garden festival and the Mersey Basin Campaign.
