= 1981 Chapeltown riots =

Civil disorder in Leeds, Yorkshire, England

The Chapeltown Riots of 1981 took place in the Leeds district of Chapeltown in West Yorkshire, England, during a time when many other areas of the UK were suffering similar problems (such as London, Birmingham and Liverpool). The riots unfolded in July 1981 from a background of racial tension, inner city poverty, poor housing and high unemployment (which was rising rapidly as a result of the recession at the time). This brought high tension, particularly amongst the area's Caribbean community, culminating in attacks on the local police.

The Yorkshire Evening Post reported on the events from a 'law and order' perspective, quoting police and council sources. The Leeds Other Paper reported on the social and community aspects of the disturbances, including the root causes.

These were not to be the last riots in the area. In 1987 there was further rioting in Chapeltown and in 2001 there was widespread rioting in nearby Harehills.

== See also ==
- Chapeltown
- Harehills
- 1975 Chapeltown riot
- 1987 Chapeltown riot
- Harehills riot
- List of race riots

Other riots in the UK the same year

- 1981 Brixton riot - London
- Handsworth riots - Birmingham
- 1981 Toxteth riots - Liverpool
