= Caleidra =

English singer-songwriter

Naomi
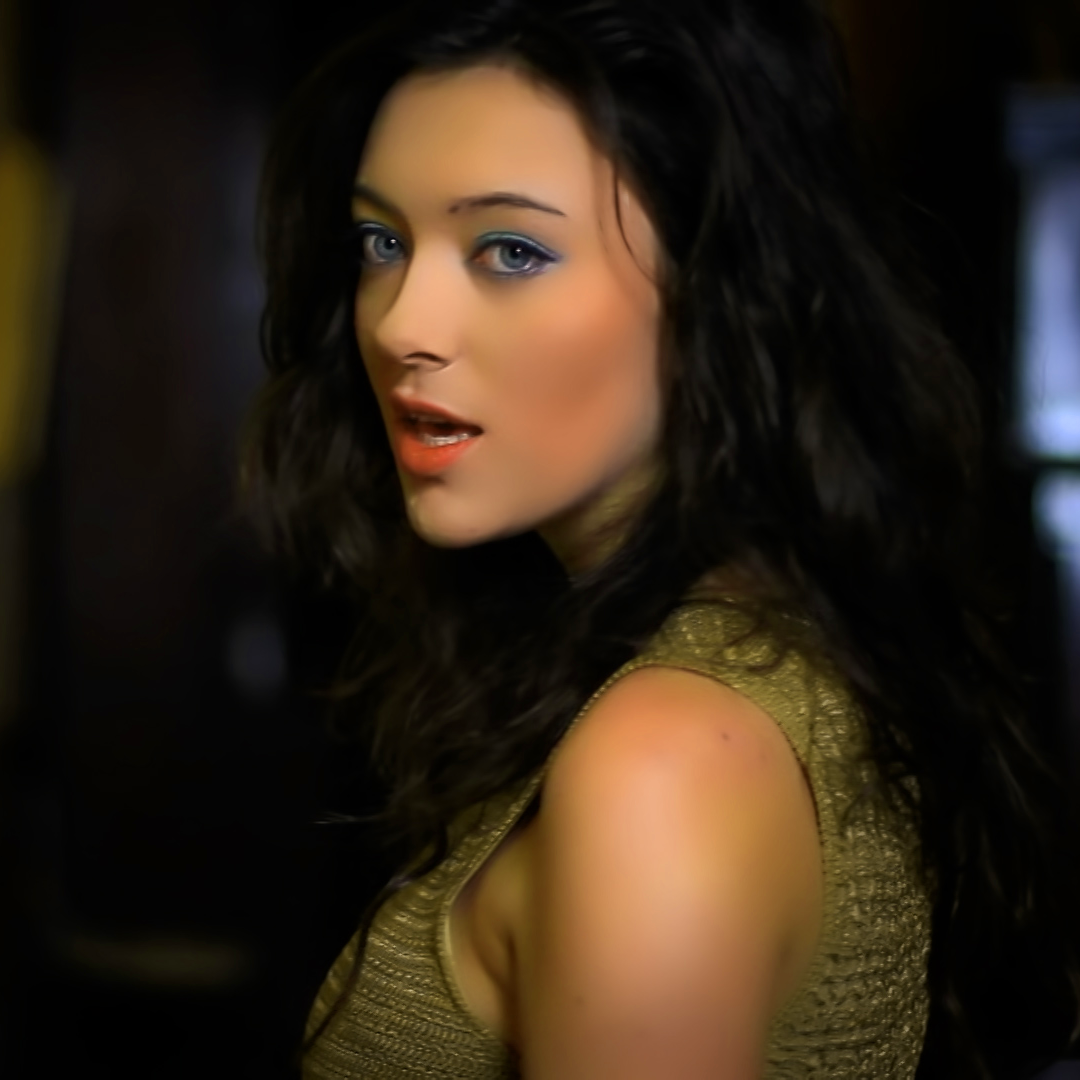
- A photo still from the official music video from the song "Miss Me"

Background information
- Born: Naomi Rhianna Higginson; 29 June 1996 (age 30); Manchester, England
- Genres: Pop, pop rock
- Instruments: Vocals, piano, acoustic guitar, ukulele
- Years active: 2012–present
- Labels: QG Records, Sunshine Boys Records, A&G Publishing

Naomi Rhianna Higginson (born 29 June 1996), formerly known as Caleidra, is an English singer-songwriter born and raised in Manchester, England. She first came to prominence after a song she wrote at school in her music class, led to her being signed to a record label and the release of her first single 'With You' on 24 August 2012. This received national media coverage and Naomi appeared on television programmes such as ITV Daybreak, ITV Granada Reports, radio including BBC Radio Manchester, Blast 1386 and Salford City Radio, in the national press, The Times, The Independent and The Guardian, teen magazines Mizz and Shout. Her second single was produced by John McLaughlin who previously worked with Busted, 911 and Westlife and led to further appearances in the media, including ITV Granada Reports, further live performances on BBC Radio Manchester, BBC Radio Sheffield, Salford City Radio and during the Manchester International Festival and received impressive media reviews including Music Week.

In October 2013, Naomi released the EP 'Another Day' produced by John McLaughlin and Dave Thomas Jr.

In December 2013, Naomi began presenting her own radio show on North Manchester 106.6 FM every Saturday between 12:00 and 14:00.

In January 2014, Naomi signed a global publishing and sync deal with London and LA based A&GSync and A&G Songs Ltd and this led to Naomi's song "Start Again" being used by TalkTalk Business for their UK online, television and radio advertising campaign.

In 2013/2014 Naomi played 2 concerts at The Etihad Stadium and played to over 7000 people at Oldham Christmas festival at the end of 2014. She also played 41 concerts to over 15,000 youngsters across the UK throughout the year.

On 11 August 2014, Naomi changed her stage name from 'Caleidra' to 'Naomi'.

In 2015, Naomi began work on writing and recording her debut album with producers John McLaughlin and Jud Mahoney and published a video for the song 'Rivers Run' on video on 6 June 2015.

== Music career ==
=== Discovered by Bob Miller (2012) ===
Naomi began her pop music career at the age of fifteen after being spotted by Bob Miller (Corinne Bailey Rae, Christine Collister) who heard a song she had written in school for her GCSE music class called 'With You'. She then signed to the independent label QG Records and was mentored by the former head of press at MCA Records and press at Polydor Records, Pete Bassett. Naomi came to prominence after the release of her first single 'With You' on 24 August 2012, for which she was featured on the front page of the Manchester Evening News, Oldham Advertiser, Oldham Evening Chronicle and then nationally on ITV Daybreak and featured on ITV Granada Reports. Naomi was subsequently featured in The Independent, The Times, Metro, The Huffington Post and The Guardian.

Numerous radio interviews followed, including BBC Radio Manchester on the Becky Want show with Justin Moorhouse and Salford City Radio where Naomi performed live and a large following was developing, especially in her home city of Manchester.

Her success led to interviews and articles in teen magazines such as Mizz, Shout, Bliss. and the music magazine Music Week, who described Naomi as a 'talented songwriter'.

=== Debut EP, working with John McLaughlin (2013) ===
The producer John McLaughlin, who has had numerous number-one hits after working with bands such as Busted, 911, Mark Owen, Westlife and the winning songwriting coach on BBC's Fame Academy wanted to work with Naomi after seeing her on TV and describes how "I just had to work with her". McLaughlin produced her next single 'Miss Me' which was released on 3 March 2013 on Sunshine Boys Records.

Naomi was invited back to be interviewed and perform live in two one-hour specials at Salford City Radio.

Naomi was interviewed and performed live on BBC Radio Manchester on the Becky Want show with Amy Clowes who described her live performance on the show as "Brilliant, absolutely brilliant".

Naomi was again interviewed by Oldham Advertiser, Oldham Evening Chronicle and on ITV Granada Reports along with teachers and pupils at her school who took part in the video for Naomi's next release, 'Ask Me Why', again produced by McLaughlin.

As well as performing live on radio, Naomi has twice been invited to perform live for the Internet TV show Ont'Sofa and at a number of venues and festivals in the UK, including during the Manchester International Festival at the DryLive in Manchester on 5 July 2013 for Designer Magazine and the Hulme Party in the park festival on 22 June 2013.

Naomi also worked with Matt Dixon, former senior product manager at EMI Records and on her debut EP 'Another Day', produced by John McLaughlin, Dave Thomas Jr and Jud Mahoney released in October 2013.

=== Worldwide publishing deal (2014) ===
The success of her EP, 'Another Day' led to Naomi being offered a publishing and Sync deal with A&G songs and the song 'Start Again' from the EP being selected as the music for TalkTalk Business online, television and radio advertising campaign across the UK.

A UK tour of schools was undertaken, with Naomi performing songs from her debut EP to an estimated 15,000 children at over 41 concerts through the year. and performed live at various community radio stations, BBC Radio Sheffield and BBC Radio Manchester.

Naomi worked with a number of songwriters and producers on her debut album, including Sara Eker, Oscar nominated Nick Southwood, Alex Davies, Alex Elliott.

On 16 November 2014, Naomi performed in front of an estimated 7000 people at the Oldham Christmas Lights switch on.

=== Debut album (2015) ===
Naomi has spent 2015 writing and recording her debut album and on 6 June 2015, Naomi published a track from the album 'Rivers Run', co-written with Jud Mahoney and John McLaughlin. This was quickly followed by a live performance of new songs at the West End Festival in Glasgow on 7 June 2015 and a billboard campaign with Forrest Media.

== Discography ==
=== Singles ===
Year	Single details
2012	"With You": Released: 26 August 2012; Label: QG Records; Format: Digital download
2013	"Miss Me": Released: 3 March 2013; Label: Sunshine Boys Records; Format: Digital download
