= The Good, the Bad, the Ugly (Frankee album) =

2004 studio album by Frankee

Studio album by Frankee
- Released: 2004
- Recorded: 2004
- Genre: R&B
- Length: 37:52
- Label: Marro

Singles from The Good, the Bad, the Ugly
- 1. "F.U.R.B. (Fuck You Right Back)" Released: 2004

The Good, the Bad, the Ugly is the only studio album by American R&B singer Frankee, released in 2004. The album's lead single, "F.U.R.B. (Fuck You Right Back)", was written in response to Eamon's hit "Fuck It (I Don't Want You Back)" and became a number-one hit in the United Kingdom and Australia; her song also charted on the US Billboard Hot 100.

The album was released on April 27, 2004, by Marro Records and peaked at number 51 on the UK Albums Chart. It failed to chart in the United States and elicited generally mixed reviews from music critics.

== Background ==
Frankee first drew attention in early 2004 with "F.U.R.B. (Fuck You Right Back)", recorded in response to American rapper Eamon's "Fuck It (I Don't Want You Back)". The song became a number-one hit in the United Kingdom, succeeding Eamon's song at the top spot. The song also attained some success in the United States, entering the Billboard Hot 100 and peaking at number 63, and becoming a top 40 hit on the Billboard Rhythmic Songs and Mainstream Top 40 charts. The song also became a number-one hit in Australia. It remained Frankee's only single until 2006, when she released "Watch Me" as a follow-up.

== Critical reception ==
Professional ratings
Review scores
Source	Rating
RTÉ Entertainment	4/5 stars
Rolling Stone	2/5 stars
Vibe	positive

The Good, the Bad, the Ugly drew mostly mixed reviews from music critics. Christian Hoard, writing for Rolling Stone magazine, awarded the album two out of five stars, deeming the songs "annoyingly silly and brightly sassy" and commenting that the beats are similar to those of teen pop. Hoard also called Frankee's "diva-in-training." AllMusic noted "I Do Me" and "F.U.R.B." as "track picks." Vibe singled out "Him" and "F.U.R.B. (Fuck You Right Back)" and opined that Frankee "sings with both sassiness ... and saltiness". RTÉ, Ireland's National Public Service Broadcaster, awarded the album four out of five stars, noting Frankee's "straight-up language and bad-ass girl power" and commending the album's division into three segments as "an emotional human rollercoaster".

== Commercial performance ==
Upon its release, The Good, the Bad, the Ugly achieved modest success in the United Kingdom. It debuted at its number 51 peak on the UK Albums Chart dated June 21, 2004. The following week, it fell to number 74, before falling off of the chart entirely. It remains Frankee's only top 100 entry on the UK albums chart.

== Track listing ==
The Good, the Bad, the Ugly track listing
No.	Title	Writer(s)	Producer(s)	Length
1.	"I Do Me"			3:21
2.	"How You Do"			3:42
3.	"In Love with Me"			3:02
4.	"I'm Leaving"			4:00
5.	"Gotta Man"			2:30
6.	"Who the Hell Are You"			3:14
7.	"Him"			3:04
8.	"I Told You So"			4:36
9.	"Hell No"			3:32
10.	"Don't Be Mad"			3:33
11.	"F.U.R.B. (F**k You Right Back)"	Mark Passy; Kirk Robinson; Jennifer Graziano; Frankee; Eamon	Jessi Jordan; Ty Real	3:18
Total length:				37:52

== Charts ==
Chart (2004)	Peak position
Scottish Albums (OCC)	63
UK Albums (OCC)	51
UK R&B Albums (OCC)	23
