= Community cohesion =

Social policy term in the United Kingdom

Community cohesion is a conceptual framework for social policy in the United Kingdom which attempts to measure the social relationships within a community. It relies on criteria such as: the presence of a shared vision, inclusion of those with diverse backgrounds, equal opportunity, and supportive relationships between individuals. It was introduced in the UK in 2001 after the 2001 England riots. The ideas contained within the framework have been refined a number of times, though the definition remains undefined. It has also been criticised as political in nature, with moral imperatives which are not overly helpful.

== History ==
The concept of community cohesion was established in the United Kingdom following a number of riots and disturbances in England in 2001. Although the term had been used in different contexts previously (in Canada, for example), the first report to employ the term and to propose a new policy framework around it was Community Cohesion: The Report of The Independent Review Team. The report considered the national and wider dimensions of community relations and reviewed both those areas that had not suffered disturbances, as well as those that had. The report's findings became best known for identifying the parallel lives of minority and majority communities, but also proposed a wide range of new policies, which were subsequently adopted by government and other agencies.

The Cantle Report was supported by three local reviews of the three towns most affected by the riots. These were: for Bradford, the Ouseley Report (2001); for Oldham, the Ritchie Report (2001) and; for Burnley, the Clarke Report (2001). (The Ouseley Report was commissioned prior to the disturbances in Bradford.) The government responded with Building Cohesive Communities, a Report of the Ministerial Group on Public Order (The "Denham Report") which set out a wide range of proposed actions.

The concept of community cohesion was subsequently widely adopted in the UK and some of the ideas and approaches have also been taken up in other countries. Government, local government, public service and voluntary agencies widely embraced the new policy direction, many establishing community cohesion officers and teams to develop strategies and implement the new approach. While the Welsh Government continues with its strategy, in England, the Coalition Government elected in 2010 preferred to build their strategy around the idea of integration, though many policies have remained the same.

== Conceptual and practical development ==
There have been at least three formal national definitions of the concept, each building upon the other from 2002 to 2008. All refer to the need for strong and positive relationships between people from different backgrounds, tackling inequalities and developing a positive climate of opinion to support diversity. There are also a large number of local definitions, which draw upon the formal national definitions but add a local context.

The first and most widely used, built directly on the Cantle and Denham reports, and was constructed by the co-authors of the Guidance on Community Cohesion, the Local Government Association, the then Office of the Deputy Prime Minister, the Commission of Racial Equality and the Inter-Faith Network:

A cohesive community is one where:

- There is common vision and a sense of belonging for all communities;
- The diversity of people’s different backgrounds and circumstances are appreciated and positively valued;
- Those from different backgrounds have similar life opportunities; and
- Strong and positive relationships are being developed between people from different backgrounds in the workplace, in schools and within neighbourhoods.

— Local Government Association et al, 2002

Some five years later the Commission for Integration and Cohesion proposed a number of amended and additional points, which added concepts of trust, rights and responsibilities. Three 'ways of living together' were added by the Department of Communities and Local Government (CLG) in response to the CIC report.

The policy domain produced guidance and resulted in less reliance on the definition and more upon the emerging practice. LGA et al. issued guidance to support local government and partner agencies. This emphasised the importance of common values, cross community and cross disciplinary working, and the need to continue to tackle inequalities and disadvantage. Moreover, a Community Cohesion Unit was established in 2002 to co-ordinate national work and implement practice. This was supported by an independent panel of practitioners who developed guidance and best practice on cohesion. Its work concluded with a final report the End of Parallel Lives that stressed the importance of mainstreaming cohesion into local government services. Much of this thinking was brought together by the Home Office publication Improving Opportunity, Strengthening Society in 2005. Building community cohesion was one of the four key themes alongside addressing inequality, promoting inclusiveness and tackling racism and extremism.

Guidance was produced on a wide range of policy areas. These included:

- Commission on Integration and Cohesion (CIC) (2007): What Works in Community Cohesion
- Commission on Integration and Cohesion (CIC) (2007): Integration and Cohesion Case Studies
- Department for Communities and Local Government (DCLG) (2008): Cohesion Guidance for Funders: Summary of Responses
- Department for Communities and Local Government (DCLG) (2009): Guidance on meaningful interaction – How encouraging positive relationships between people can help build community cohesion
- Department for Communities and Local Government (DCLG) (2009): Delivering Mixed Communities – Learning the Lessons from Existing Programmes
- Department for Children, Schools and Families (2007): Guidance on the Duty to Promote Community Cohesion
- Home Office et al. (2003): Building a Picture of Community Cohesion
- Home Office and Office Deputy Prime Minister (2004): Building Community Cohesion into Area Based Initiatives
- Home Office (2004): Community Cohesion Standards for Schools
- Home Office (2005): Community Cohesion: Seven Steps
- Home Office (2005): Integration Matters: A National Strategy for Refugee Integration
- Institute of Community Cohesion (iCoCo) (2006): The Power of Sport—Policy and Practice: Sport and Cohesion
- Institute of Community Cohesion (iCoCo) (2006): A Sense of Belonging, The Communications Toolkit
- Institute of Community Cohesion (iCoCo) (2006): Cohesion Mapping of Community Dynamics (COHDMAP)
- Institute of Community Cohesion (iCoCo) (2006): Challenging Communities to Change: A Review of Community Cohesion in Oldham
- Institute of Community Cohesion (iCoCo) (2007): Understanding and Monitoring Tension in Local Communities
- Institute of Community Cohesion (iCoCo) (2007): Promoting Sustainable Communities and Community Cohesion
- Institute of Community Cohesion (iCoCo) (2007): New European Migration, A Good Practice Guide for Local Authorities
- Institute of Community Cohesion (iCoCo) (2008): Understanding and Appreciating Muslim Diversity: Towards Better Engagement and Participation
- Institute of Community Cohesion (iCoCo) (2011): Far Right Electoral and other Activity: the Challenge for Community Cohesion
- Local Government Association et al. (LGA) (2002): Guidance on Community Cohesion
- Local Government Association (LGA), Home Office, ODPM, CRE, The Audit Commission, The IDeA, The Inter-Faith Network (2004): Community Cohesion—An Action Guide
- Local Government Association (LGA), Improvement and Development Agency (IDeA), the Home Office, Audit Commission and Office of the Deputy Prime Minister. (2006): Leading Cohesive Communities: A Guide for Local Authority Leaders and Chief Executives
- Local Government Information Unit (LGIU) (2005): Scrutiny of Community Cohesion Issues
- Local Government Information Unit (LGIU) (2006): Countering Myths and Misinformation during Election Periods

== Academic critique ==
In contrast to the policy literature, academic publications were initially few and far between. On the whole they tended to be critical of the concept of community cohesion, though some of the more recent works have been supportive.

The first academic textbook, produced by a proponent of the concept and author of the Cantle Report was supportive and attempted to build a substantial and theoretical underpinning for community cohesion. Community Cohesion: A New Framework for Race and Diversity was first published in 2005, with an updated version in 2008. This analysis suggested that multicultural policy and practice had contributed to separation and segregation and built on the idea of the parallel lives of the earlier Cantle Report. However, it also sought to establish a broader sense of difference, in which identity was not limited to the multicultural paradigm of race and suggested that cohesion was concerned with identity based on sexual orientation, gender, faith, disability, nationality and other forms of identities, as well as that of ethnicity.

Other academics claimed that community cohesion was being used as part of a new politically inspired approach to, firstly, shift the agenda towards one of assimilation of minorities and, secondly, move away from the focus on inequalities and disadvantage. McGhee (2005), for example, challenged the notion of the cosmopolitan identities and associated it with the then politics of New Labour. He suggests that "identity, culture and tradition are seen as conducive to prejudice, antagonism, polarization, mistrust, hatred and overt (fanatical) loyalty associated with preservationist or past-orientated orientations" and that emotionally hot patterns of identity are being replaced by "a calmer cosmopolitan mentality which is characterised by flexibility, ‘cool’ loyalties and thin patterns of solidarity." Burnett (2004) saw the debate in the same political terms as McGhee and similarly detected assimilationist tendencies in the reform of the notion of identity and suggested that the then New Labour Government used both the idea of community cohesion and the idea of communitarianism as a "bridge between the concept of citizenship (and its obligations) and ever widening notions of criminality." He believed this amounted to the conjuring up of a fear of a "new moral order." Burnett's later comments (Burnett, 2007), however, acknowledged that community cohesion policies did also put an emphasis on the need for majority White majority communities to change. McGhee (2008, p53) is also concerned about what this change of direction means in practice and for example, sees attempts to develop the use of English language on a more pervasive basis as an extension of the Government's ‘linguistic nationalism’ which focuses on the "easiest signifier of sameness and difference," rather than it being a means by which diverse communities can communicate and interact. Harrison (2005)takes a similar view, fearing assimilation "in which the entrenched barriers and values of white communities pass relatively unchallenged (Harrison, 2005, p. 91)."

The same approach has been taken by activists and commentators that support the race-based conceptions of a divided society. Kundnani, for example, claims that the changing nature of debates on ‘race’ has helped to shift the imperative to integration and by building shared norms, common identity and stable communities, diverse groups would be expected to ‘buy into’ British institutions, organisations and processes. Lentin and Titley (2011) also believe that the development of community cohesion was a means of reining back race relations policies on the part of Government.

Whilst the 2001 reports did draw attention to structural inequalities and disadvantage faced by communities and made recommendations for addressing them, it was nevertheless suggested that the community cohesion agenda failed to take full account of socio-economic factors and has been a means of diverting attention away from them.

Indeed, Promoting Social Cohesion: Implications for policy and practice takes as its starting point the need to reconceptualise community cohesion as social cohesion in order to emphasise structural conditions and equality targets. The suggestion that community cohesion did not take full account of inequalities from the outset is contradicted by the formal definition adopted by the LGA (see above). The idea of a simplistic link between disadvantage and prejudice and discrimination is also contested by Cantle (2012). It is also contested by Thomas who dismisses this charge in the first academic study based upon real evidence from the operation of cohesion in local communities. The assertions were also contradicted by the Government policy commitments given during the earlier development, particularly the annual series of Building Opportunity, Strengthening Society reports from 2005. The commitment to tackling inequalities and "making social justice visible" was also reaffirmed by the review of community cohesion conducted by the Commission for Integration and Cohesion in 2007 and in the Government's response to it made the following year.

In challenging the earlier assertions about community cohesion, Thomas (2011) suggests that whilst it had been out of step with most academic analysis, that analysis had been "completely free of empirical evidence, resting instead on national governmental reports and discourse"(Thomas, 2011 p. 4). Thomas's study is based on evidence from the areas which have the "profound ethnic segregation, and the separate, oppositional and potentially dangerous ethnic and religious identities" (Thomas, 2011 p. 4) that community cohesion policy was concerned with. Indeed, Thomas chides the critiques of cohesion for developing ‘evidence free’ views and for ignoring the empirical data that had been produced (Thomas, 2011 p. 92).

Further, Thomas (2011) dismisses the charges that cohesion was in some way a return to assimilationism or a shift away from tackling inequalities. He found that community cohesion was simply "a critique of particular forms of multiculturalism policy formation and operation that have focused exclusively on the needs, identities and concerns of each separate ethnic group without consideration of relations, links and experiences shared between those groups"(Thomas, 2011 p. 91). Thomas also found that, rather than promote assimilation, "community cohesion practice accepts and works with distinct ethnic and social identities, whilst augmenting them with overarching identities based on common connections, needs and experiences" (Thomas, 2011 p. 168).

In addition, Delanty (2011) goes to the heart of the academic critique by pointing out that "The notion of a cultural encounter has been a surprisingly neglected topic in sociology and has hardly been addressed in related fields", in other words, the central concern of community cohesion had simply not been seriously considered in previous race relations theory, casting doubt on the validity of the previous academic concerns.

More than sixteen years since the concept of 'parallel lives' was expounded in the Cantle Report, Thomas et al., (2017) has found clear evidence of their continued existence in Dewsbury, West Yorkshire, an area previously identified as a 'failed space' of multiculturalism and one which has much in common with many other English Northern towns and cities. From an extensive study of the local area, Thomas et al. concluded that '‘parallel lives’ are a lived reality' in which 'discourses focused around racial and religious differences ‘saturate’ everyday life – they are the lens through which social and political life is read by many local people' and that this was particularly the case for White British residents. Again, this suggests that empirical study supports the thesis of community cohesion.

Austin and Hunter (2013) reviewed school-based projects internationally that use online communication technologies to promote community cohesion by bringing children from diverse communities (often, communities in conflict or post conflict situations). They particularly focused on active projects in Ireland, the United Kingdom, Europe, and Israel and noted the relative absence of such programs in North America. They argue that online technologies may serve to provide the kind of positive contact called for in research on the contact hypothesis, especially in environments where face-to-face contact may be deemed unsafe, impractical or expensive. They speculate that increasing use of social media in schools may serve to increase the potential for projects that seek to promote community cohesion using information and communications technology.

In addition, there are a number of related policy areas which provide overwhelming support for the practice and process of community cohesion.

These include:

- In respect of intergroup relations and contact theory, a number of academic studies, building on earlier work of Allport and others, have clearly demonstrated that prejudice and intolerance can be reduced by direct contact and interaction.
- The academic and practical work on peace and reconciliation has demonstrated that inter group relations can be re-built by going through painful processes of discussing and resolving differences.
- The work on social capital developed by Putnam in 2000, demonstrates the importance of ‘bridging social capital’. Whilst some aspects of Putnam's work is contested, there is little dispute about the short-term impact of population churn and the impact of diversity upon its development. This leads on to the important considerations of the role of citizenship and the development of shared values.
- Communitarian theories have been developed with a new emphasis upon shared identities and ideas about interculturalism have begun to gain currency.

== Prospects ==
Whilst the debate surrounding community cohesion will no doubt continue, there is little disagreement that the breaking down of barriers between communities and the building of trust and understanding is a desirable objective. The use of community cohesion programmes to disconfirm stereotypes and misconceptions about the ‘other’, has had some success and is used to promote good relations between a wide range of communities. In some cases, there are clear and measurable impacts of such programmes and generally measure attitudinal and behavioural change in the programme participants, or in the wider local community.

In addition to the small-scale programmes focused on divided communities, community cohesion has also developed at a citywide or area level to develop support a broader consensus in support of diversity. These often included high-profile campaigns featuring people from a range of backgrounds who all belong and contribute to the economic and cultural life of the area. These campaigns were important in that they tried to present a new positive picture of diversity and whilst recognising the value of cultural heritage and distinctiveness, it placed a new emphasis on the commonalities between groups and thereby contributed to a less defensive and more progressive form of multiculturalism, or towards the idea of interculturalism.

== See also ==
- Gemeinschaft and Gesellschaft
- Integration
- Multiculturalism
- Social cohesion
- Social determinants of health
- Social determinants of health in poverty
- Social determinants of mental health
- Social solidarity
- Structural cohesion
