= Ray Honeyford =

British headteacher (1934–2012)

- Born: Raymond Honeyford; 24 February 1934; Manchester
- Died: 5 February 2012 (aged 77)
- Occupation: Headteacher

Raymond Honeyford (24 February 1934, in Manchester – 5 February 2012) was a British headteacher, writer, and critic of the failures of multiculturalism, which he witnessed throughout his profession life. As a result of the observations he made Honeyford was targeted in a racist hate campaign.

In the early 1980s, when he was headmaster of Drummond Middle School in Bradford, Yorkshire, he wrote an article critical of multiculturalism and its effect on British education: this was published in January 1984, in The Salisbury Review, a conservative magazine edited by the philosopher Roger Scruton. Honeyford was suspended after being accused of racism, then regained his job after an appeal to the High Court. However, faced with a hostile campaign, he subsequently decided to take an early retirement from teaching.

== Life ==
Honeyford was born into a large working-class family, and grew up in very poor conditions. His father was an unskilled labourer who, after being wounded in the First World War, could work only intermittently. Honeyford's mother was the daughter of Irish parents.

Of his 10 siblings, six died in childhood. The small house which the family occupied in Manchester did not contain a single book. Honeyford failed his eleven plus exam and went to Manchester Technical School. At 15 he started work in an office to support his family. At the same time he attended evening classes to train as a teacher. In later years he took an MA in Linguistics at Lancaster University.

Before becoming headmaster of Drummond Middle School in 1981, Honeyford taught at various secondary schools in the Manchester area, including Lostock School. By 1985 Drummond Middle School had around 500 pupils: more than 90 per cent were non-white, and 85 per cent were Asian.

== Press controversy ==
An article written by Honeyford for the Salisbury Review in 1984 discussed ethnicity, culture and assimilation, and educational performance. He had already publicised his views in two letters in 1982, sent to the Times Educational Supplement (TES) and a local Bradford paper, and then in an extended article in the TES in November 1982. In the latter, he argued that the onus for integration and the constraints on educational performance lay in the home environment of immigrant families. He attacked what he saw as the misplaced use of multiculturalism in schools, including the failure to teach children English from a young age: "Those of us working in Asian areas are encouraged, officially, to 'celebrate linguistic diversity', i.e. applaud the rapidly mounting linguistic confusion in those growing number of inner-city schools in which British-born Asian children begin their mastery of English by being taught in Urdu." He countered that "if a school contains a disproportionate number of children for whom English is a second language (true of all Asian children, even those born here), or children from homes where educational ambition and the values to support it are conspicuously absent (i.e. the vast majority of West Indian homes – a disproportionate number of which are fatherless) then academic standards are bound to suffer." The result, he said, was "a small but growing group of dispossessed, indigenous parents whose schools are, as a direct result of the multiracial dimension, failing their children".

He also attacked "political correctness" and the "race relations lobby" for employing "a dubious, officially approved argot which functions to maintain a whole set of questionable beliefs and attitudes about education and race – attitudes which have much more to do with professional opportunism than the educational progress of ethnic minority children".

Honeyford had already been in discussion with his Local Education Authority after the 1982 TES article, in the context of Bradford Council guidelines on educational aims issued in that year, but had not been disciplined. After the second article, Bradford's then Labour mayor, Mohammed Ajeeb, called for his dismissal, and Honeyford was suspended in April 1985. However, after his successful appeal to the High Court, Honeyford was reinstated in September. He then became the target of a campaign by an action group involving a number of parents; sections of Honeyford's writings were translated into Urdu, and protests were held outside his school. Honeyford had to be given police protection, and in December he finally took early retirement, about two years after The Salisbury Review article was published.

== Posthumous assessment ==
Mohammed Ajeeb, in an interview with the BBC published after Honeyford's death in 2012, defended his action against Honeyford: "His job was not to wander into race politics. His comments were taken up by racist people who made him a hero. I received hate mail saying I should go. [...] It's not the substance of what he said that was so offensive. It's how he said it and the right-wing journal in which he chose to say it."

Graham Mahony, who was appointed Bradford Council's chief race relations officer in 1984, said in an interview after Honeyford's death: "Honeyford had some valid points that should have been discussed, but because of the way he expressed them the opposite happened. The debate was suppressed and didn't surface again until the riots (in 1995 and 2001)." The latter riot resulted in the Ouseley Report, which noted that Bradford had become deeply divided by segregated schooling, resulting in children leaving full-time education with little knowledge of the lives of other communities.

The journalist and author Robert Winder said that Honeyford made "a serious point" when he argued that the kind of multiculturalism "which encouraged [pupils] to work within their own cultures and languages...was cumbersome, inefficient and divisive". However, Winder said, Honeyford had made his case "intemperately", and as "Bradford had an Asian mayor, and over two hundred Asian community organisations", his dismissal was inevitable.

In his autobiography, Scruton wrote, "Ray Honeyford was branded as a racist, horribly pilloried, and eventually sacked, for saying what everyone now admits to be true".
