= Golden Rail Motel =

Studio album by Eamon
- Released: September 15, 2017
- Recorded: September 2016–January 2017
- Studio: The Lion's Den and The Space Ship in Los Angeles, California
- Genre: R&B
- Length: 34:26
- Label: Huey Ave Music
- Producer: Eamon; Stoupe; Snipe Young; Dan Ubick

Eamon chronology
Love & Pain (2006)	Golden Rail Motel (2017)

Singles from Golden Rail Motel
- 1. "Be My Girl" Released: April 7, 2017; 2. "Before I Die" Released: June 16, 2017; 3. "I Got Soul" Released: September 8, 2017

Golden Rail Motel is the third studio album by American singer-songwriter Eamon. It was released on September 15, 2017, by Huey Ave Music. Recording sessions for the album took place between late 2016 and mid-2017 at The Lion's Den and The Space Ship Studios in Los Angeles, California. Golden Rail Motel contains themes of struggle, insanity, redemption, and love, and features a fusion of R&B and traditional soul music, along with elements of pop and hip hop music.

Golden Rail Motel was released to critical acclaim, with one review describing the record as "perfectly placed to slot into the retro-soul ranks", and another saying it is "a declaration that Eamon is here to stay." The run-up single to the record, "I Got Soul", featured a well-received one-shot music video directed by film director Douglas Quill.

== Background ==
After experiencing worldwide success with his hit single "Fuck It (I Don't Want You Back)" (2003), Eamon succumbed to the pitfalls of fame and fortune, namely drug abuse and addiction for several years following the release of his second album Love & Pain. Eamon, however, was able to recover from his addiction and in 2012 signed a recording contract with an independent label based out of San Francisco whom he recorded an album's worth of material for. The record was shelved after the label went bankrupt and its CFO was convicted of fraud and sentenced to 45 years in federal prison.

Eamon continued to write and record music. After featuring on a few Jedi Mind Tricks songs, the rap group's producer, Stoupe reached out to Eamon to record vocals for a producer's album he was working on. Both Stoupe and his record label were so pleased with the outcome, they decided to team up to produce the album that would become Golden Rail Motel.

== Critical reception ==
Professional ratings
Review scores
Source	Rating
Blues & Soul	5/5 stars
Exclaim!	8/10
The Independent	4/5 stars

Golden Rail Motel was met with positive reviews from critics. The Canadian publication Exclaim! wrote that the album "showcases an artist in ripening maturity conquering his demons." In a four-star review, the British newspaper The Independent singled out Eamon's vocal abilities as the "most impressive" aspect of the album. The album was further praised for its honesty, intensity, and grit.

== Track listing ==
No.	Title	Writer(s)	Producer(s)	Length
1.	"Before I Die"	Eamon, L.G. Young, R.D. Archie	Snipe Young, Eamon, Dan Ubick	3:29
2.	"Be My Girl"	Eamon, L.G. Young, K. Baldwin	Snipe Young, Stoupe, Eamon	3:12
3.	"Lock Me Down"	Eamon, K. Baldwin, L.G. Young, K. Clark, I. Quintero, D. Ubick	Stoupe, Dan Ubick, Eamon	3:02
4.	"I Got Soul"	Eamon, D. Ubick, K. Baldwin, L.G. Young, C. Dandridge, A. Montella	Dan Ubick, Eamon, Stoupe, Steve Kaye	3:11
5.	"Burn It Up"	Eamon, L.G. Young, K. Baldwin, D. Ubick	Stoupe, Eamon, Dan Ubick	3:32
6.	"Mama Don't Cry"	Eamon, C. Dandridge, B.A. Heard	Eamon, Benj Heard, Steve Kaye	3:40
7.	"You and Only You"	Eamon, D. Ubick, K. Baldwin, L.G. Young, R. Donahue	Dan Ubick, Eamon, Stoupe, Snipe Young	3:53
8.	"Hands Make You Dance"	Eamon, K. Baldwin, L.G. Young, I. Quintero	Stoupe, Snipe Young, Dan Ubick, Eamon	3:09
9.	"Run"	Eamon, D. Ubick, K. Baldwin, A. Montella, M. Bailey, Jr., D. Elbert	Stoupe, Eamon, Dan Ubick	2:55
10.	"Requiem"	Eamon, C. Dandridge	Mikal Blue	4:21

Golden Rail Motel – bonus tracks
No.	Title	Writer(s)	Producer(s)	Length
11.	"Way Too Close"	Eamon	Mikal Blue; Eamon	3:40

== Personnel ==
=== Musicians ===
- Eamon – vocals, production
- Stoupe – drums
- Dan Ubick – guitars and Hammond organ
- Snipe Young – drums, percussion, bass, Hammond organ, Fender Rhodes
- Jake Najor – drums
- Dave Wilder – bass
- Connie Price – percussion
- David Ralicke – baritone and tenor saxophone
- Jordan Katz – trumpet, valve trombone, flugelhorn
- James King – baritone and tenor saxophone
- Dan Hastie – piano
- Chandler S. Dandridge – piano and Wurlitzer electric piano
- Benj Heard – piano, percussion
- Steve Kaye – bass guitar, violin, viola, cello
- D'Wayne Kelly – Hammond organ
- Ish Quintero – clavichord
- Jeff Babko – vibraphone on bonus track
- Sean Hurley – bass guitar on bonus track
- Michael Ward – guitar on bonus track
- Dave Palmer – piano, farfisa, and Hammond organ on bonus track
- Brian S. Carr – accordion on bonus track
- Jonathan Weber – violin on track 6
- Edward Paid – violin on track 6
- Francis Birchall – violin on track 6
- Bianica Beliankina – violin on track 6
- Derek Crowley – viola on track 6
- Joshua Bremer – viola on track 6
- Michael Kling – cello on track 6
- Sarah Thiele – piano on track 10
- Luis Conte – percussion on track 10, percussion and timpani on bonus track
- Josefina Vergara – violin on track 10 and bonus track
- Ashoka Thiagarajan – violin on track 10 and bonus track
- Chung-Mei Chang – violin on track 10 and bonus track
- Lisa Liu – violin on track 10 and bonus track
- Caroline Buckman – viola on track 10 and bonus track
- Luke Maurer – viola on track 10 and bonus track
- Victor Lawrence – cello on track 10 and bonus track
- Ginger Murphy – cello on track 10 and bonus track
- Bart Samolis – double bass on track 10 and bonus track
- Geoffrey Osika – double bass on track 10 and bonus track
- Bill Churchville – trumpet on track 10
- Eric Jorgensen – trombone on track 10
- Steve Marsh – tenor saxophone on track 10
- Terry Landry – baritone saxophone on track 10

=== Production ===
- Eamon – production on all tracks, horn arrangements on tracks 1, 4, 5, and 9
- Stoupe – production on tracks 2, 3, 4, 5, 7, 8, 9
- Dan Ubick – production on tracks 1, 2, 3, 4, 5, 7, 8, 9, horn arrangements on tracks 1, 3, 4, 5, 7, and 9
- Snipe Young – production on tracks 1, 2, 7, 8, vocal production on tracks 1–9, horn arrangements on tracks 2
- Steve Kay – mixing on all tracks, additional production on tracks 4 and 6
- Dave Cooley – mastering on all tracks
- Mikal Blue – production and vocal production on track 10 and bonus track
- Benj Heard – production on track 6, additional production on track 10, string and horn arrangements on tracks 6, 10, and bonus track
- Andrew Williams – string and horn arrangements on track 10 and bonus track

=== Creative ===
- Vinnie Paz – executive producer
- Dan Bradley – album packaging design and layout
- Mike McRath – cover photo
- Pic Van Exel – liner notes photo
