= Bring Him Home =

Bring Him Home may refer to:

- "Bring Him Home" (Les Misérables), song from musical Les Misérables
- "(How Could You) Bring Him Home", 2006 song by Eamon
- Bring Him Home (album), 2010 album by Alfie Boe
