= Love & Pain =

Studio album by Eamon
- Released: December 4, 2006
- Recorded: February–June 2006
- Studio: Phantom Power Studios (Brooklyn, NY); Battery Studios (New York, NY); Scorccio.com Studios (Barcelona, Spain); The Closet (New Jersey)
- Genre: R&B
- Length: 38:32
- Label: Jive
- Producer: Anthony Acid; Ciro; DJ Uvex; Happy Perez; John Lardieri; Milk Dee; Needlz; Peter Lord; Phillip "Taj" Jackson; Prime; Roy "Royalty" Hamilton; V. Jeffrey Smith

Eamon chronology
I Don't Want You Back (2004)	Love & Pain (2006)	Golden Rail Motel (2017)

Singles from Love & Pain
- 1. "(How Could You) Bring Him Home" Released: September 15, 2006

Professional ratings
Review scores
Source	Rating
AllMusic	3/5 stars

Love & Pain is the second studio album by American R&B singer Eamon. It was released in the UK and Europe on December 4, 2006 via First Priority Music/Jive Records/Zomba Label Group, in spite of initially scheduled to be released in the United States on August 1, 2006, but the domestic release was postponed indefinitely for reasons not disclosed by Jive. The album remains available in the United States only as an import.

Recording sessions took place at Phantom Power Studios in Brooklyn, Battery Studios in New York, Scorccio.com Studios in Barcelona and The Closet in New Jersey. Production was handled by Milk Dee, Happy Perez, V. Jeffrey Smith, Anthony Acid, Michael Ciro, DJ Uvex, John Lardieri, Needlz, Peter Lord, Phillip "Taj" Jackson, Prime and Roy "Royalty" Hamilton. It features the lone guest appearance from June Luva. The album's lead single “(How Could You) Bring Him Home” peaked at number 26 in Italy and number 61 in the UK.

== Track listing ==
No.	Title	Writer(s)	Producer(s)	Length
1.	"Real Pro"	Eamon Doyle; A. Montella; Al Goodman; Tyrone Johnson; Sharon Seiger	DJ Uvex	1:49
2.	"(How Could You) Bring Him Home"	Jud Mahoney; Nina Woodford; James Earp; Zach Charlton	Happy Perez	3:39
3.	"Elevator"	Doyle; Phillip Jackson; S. Henriquez; Max Steiner	Phillip "Taj" Jackson; Prime	3:43
4.	"I Love Fuckin (When I Call)"	Doyle; Kirk Robinson; V. Jeffrey Smith	Milk Dee; V. Jeffrey Smith	3:24
5.	"Heatrise"	Doyle; Khari Cain; Anita Poree; Jerry Peters	Needlz	3:17
6.	"Love Lovin' U"	Doyle; Bishop; Smith	V. Jeffrey Smith; Peter Lord; MIlk Dee	4:09
7.	"Up & Down"	Doyle; Roy Hamilton	Roy "Royalty" Hamilton	3:16
8.	"My Time"	Doyle; Michael Ciro	Ciro; Milk Dee	3:59
9.	"By My Side"	Doyle; Nathan Perez; Russell Lee	Happy Perez	3:37
10.	"Ho-Wop Sound (Hold Up)"	Doyle; Robinson	Milk Dee	3:51
11.	"Older" (featuring June Luva)	Doyle; James Wilson; Anthony Caputo	Anthony Acid	3:07
12.	"Love & Pain"	Doyle; John Lardieri	John Lardieri	0:41
Total length:				38:32

Sample credits

- Track 1 contains a portion of the composition "To You With Love" written by Al Goodman, Tyrone Johnson and Sharon Seiger.
- Track 2 contains a sample from "Jezebel" as performed by Sade.
- Track 3 contains a portion of the composition "Theme from A Summer Place" written by Max Steiner.
- Track 5 contains a sample from "Going in Circles" written by Anita Poree and Jerry Peters as performed by Carolyn Franklin.
