= 2001 England riots =

2001 England riots may refer to:

- 2001 Bradford riots
- 2001 Harehills riot
- 2001 Oldham riots

== See also ==
- England riots
