= I Got Soul (Eamon song) =

Single by Eamon

from the album Golden Rail Motel
- Released: September 8, 2017
- Genre: R&B/soul
- Length: 3:11
- Label: Huey Ave Music
- Songwriter(s): E. Doyle; D. Ubick; K. Baldwin; L. Young; C. Dandridge; A. Montella
- Producer(s): Eamon; Dan Ubick; Stoupe

Eamon singles chronology
"Before I Die" (2017)	"I Got Soul" (2017)

Music video
- "I Got Soul" on YouTube

"I Got Soul" is a song performed by American R&B singer Eamon issued as the third single from his 2017 studio album Golden Rail Motel. The song was produced by Eamon and Dan Ubick of Connie Price and the Keystones and co-produced by Stoupe from Jedi Mind Tricks. Vocal production was handled by Los Angeles–based record producer Snipe Young.

The song lashes out against mass marketing and individualism, while suggesting that there are deeper, more worthwhile things to possess than money and luxury items.

== Music video ==
The official music video for “I Got Soul” was directed by Douglas Quill, who had previously worked with Eamon on R.A. the Rugged Man’s “Still Get Through the Day”, a song Eamon was featured on. The music video for "I Got Soul" is a one-shot, also known as a "one-take" or "oner". It was shot over one night in August 2017 in the Antelope Valley, a desert-like setting on the outskirts of L.A. County.

In June 2017, Eamon approached Quill about shooting a music video that takes place at a "Golden Rail Motel", the concept behind his album of the same title. Quill went on to write a treatment that features Eamon returning to a seedy, 1970's-style motel, following him from room to room, greeting his fellow "down on their luck" residents as he performs the song.

== Personnel ==
- Eamon – lead vocals, backing vocals
- Jake Najor – drums
- Dave Wilder – bass
- Connie Price – percussion
- Dan Ubick – guitars
- Chandler S. Dandridge – Wurlitzer
- Benj Heard – piano
- D'Wayne Kelly – Hammond organ
- Jordan Katz – trumpet
- David Ralicke – tenor saxophone
- Horn arrangements by Dan Ubick and Eamon
- All music recorded at The Lion's Den in Topanga Canyon, California
- All vocals recorded at The Space Ship in Los Angeles, California
- Mixing and additional production by Steve Kaye at SunKing Studios
- Mastered by Dave Cooley at Elysian Masters
