= England riots =

England riots may refer to:

- 1715 England riots, across England
- Sacheverell riots
- Swing Riots
- Leicester balloon riot
- 1919 British race riots
  - including the South Wales race riots
- 1947 England riots, in Lancashire towns
- 1958 England riots, in West London, dubbed the Notting Hill riots
- 1981 England riots, mainly in London, Liverpool, Leeds
  - including the 1981 Handsworth riots in Birmingham
- 1991 England riots
  - including the 1991 Handsworth riots in Birmingham
- 2001 England riots (disambiguation), various riots in 2001
- 2011 England riots, mainly in London, also in many other cities and towns
- 2024 England riots, began in Southport following a mass stabbing in July 2024

== See also ==
- Category:Riots and civil disorder in England
