= (How Could You) Bring Him Home =

Single by Eamon

from the album Love & Pain
- Released: September 15, 2006
- Recorded: 2006
- Genre: R&B
- Length: 3:41
- Label: Jive
- Songwriters: Jud Mahoney; Zach Charlton; Nina Woodford

Eamon singles chronology
| "I Love Them Ho's (Ho-Wop)" (2004) | "(How Could You) Bring Him Home" (2006) | "Be My Girl" (2017) |

"(How Could You) Bring Him Home" is a song by American R&B singer Eamon. The song was released on September 15, 2006, as the lead and only single from his second studio album Love & Pain (2006). The song has peaked at number 61 on the UK Singles Chart.

== Music video ==
A music video for "(How Could You) Bring Him Home" was uploaded to Eamon's VEVO account on October 25, 2009 at a total length of three minutes and 44 seconds.

== Track listing ==
Digital download
| No. | Title | Length |
|---|---|---|
| 1. | "(How Could You) Bring Him Home" | 3:41 |

== Chart performance ==
=== Weekly charts ===
| Chart (2007) | Peak position |
|---|---|
| Italy (FIMI) | 26 |
| UK Singles (Official Charts) | 67 |

== Release history ==
| Region | Date | Format | Label |
|---|---|---|---|
| United States | September 15, 2006 | Digital download | Jive Records |
