= Frankee =

American R&B singer

- Born: Nicole Francine Aiello
- Genres: R&B
- Occupation: Singer
- Years active: 2004–2006

Frankee is the stage name of Nicole Francine Aiello, an American R&B singer. She is best known for her 2004 single "F.U.R.B. (F U Right Back)", an answer song to Eamon's "Fuck It (I Don't Want You Back)". The single reached number one in both the United Kingdom and Australia.

== Career ==
Frankee released "F.U.R.B. (F U Right Back)" in 2004. The song was promoted as a response to Eamon's single "Fuck It (I Don't Want You Back)". Eamon denied that Frankee was his former girlfriend and said that his involvement with the song was limited to granting licensing permission for the use of the musical arrangement.

"F.U.R.B. (F U Right Back)" entered the UK Singles Chart at number one in May 2004 and remained at number one for three weeks. It also topped the ARIA Singles Chart in Australia. In other countries, the single reached number two in Norway, number five in Denmark, and number 14 in New Zealand.

Her debut album, The Good, the Bad, the Ugly, was released in 2004. The album reached number 51 on the UK Albums Chart. The Official Charts Company later described "F.U.R.B. (F U Right Back)" as Frankee's only UK Top 40 hit.

In May 2025, the New York Post reported that Aiello had joined the New York City Police Department in 2016 and was working as a police officer in Staten Island.

== Discography ==
=== Studio albums ===
Title	Year	Peak chart position
The Good, the Bad, the Ugly	2004	UK: 51

=== Singles ===
Title	Year	Peak chart positions										Album
Title	Year	US	US R&B/HH	AUS	DEN	FRA	NLD	NZ	NOR	SWE	UK	Album
"F.U.R.B. (F U Right Back)"	2004	63	71	1	5	22	20	14	2	33	1	The Good, the Bad, the Ugly
