= Mohammed Ajeeb =

British politician (1938–2003)

Mohammed Ajeeb CBE (born 1938) is a former Lord Mayor of Bradford, and was the first Asian (Kashmiri) Lord Mayor in the United Kingdom.

== Biography ==
Mohammed Ajeeb was born in Mirpur, Azad Kashmir in 1938. Ajeeb attended Dadyal High School and then studied at a local college in the district and went on to study at Karachi University. Ajeeb moved to Britain in 1957, and settled in Nottingham, working first in a soap factory, and then in public transport. He was also a housing officer with the District Community Relations Committee.

In 1973 he was appointed Assistant Director of SHARE (Shelter Housing and Reneval Experiment, in Bradford and went on to become the director in 1976. After joining the Labour Party in 1974, Ajeeb became Chairman of the Bradford Community Relations Council in 1977 and was elected to Bradford Metropolitan District Council in 1979. In 1984 he was elected Chairman of the Labour Group on the council and became Lord Mayor in 1985–86.

In 2001 Ajeeb was awarded the CBE in the Queen's Birthday Honours.

== Controversy ==
Ajeeb has been criticised for causing the sacking of headmaster Ray Honeyford, who in 1984 wrote an article in The Salisbury Review, arguing that multiculturalism was damaging the Pakistani children whom he taught.
