= F.U.R.B. (Fuck You Right Back) =

2004 single by Frankee

Single by Frankee

from the album The Good, the Bad, the Ugly
- Released: March 15, 2004
- Length: 3:17
- Label: Marro
- Songwriters: Mark Passy; Kirk Robinson; Jennifer Graziano; Frankee; Eamon
- Producers: Jessi Jordan; Ty Real

Frankee singles chronology
"F.U.R.B. (Fuck You Right Back)" (2004)	"Watch Me" (2006)

"F.U.R.B. (Fuck You Right Back)" is a song by American R&B singer-songwriter Frankee, released as her debut single in March 2004. The song was recorded as an answer song to Eamon's hit single "Fuck It (I Don't Want You Back)" and is based on the same melody. Although Frankee claimed to be Eamon's ex-girlfriend and that "Fuck It" was written about her, Eamon has denied this. "F.U.R.B." peaked at number one in the United Kingdom and Australia and also entered the US Billboard Hot 100, reaching number 63. Elsewhere, the song became a top-10 hit in Denmark, Germany, Ireland, and Norway.

== Background ==
Eamon initially said he selected Frankee to record the song at an audition, but later stated his only involvement was in clearing the use of the music:

"I was not involved with 'F.U.R.B.'. I have never met Frankee and she is definitely not my girlfriend or ex-girlfriend. The only way I was associated with it was when I was asked for licensing permission by Frankee's representatives, which makes me a writer on her song by copyright law. But I really didn't expect all this to come out of it, they are having fun with it, it's cool but in the end they are paying me for their 15 minutes of fame and I welcome her to my world of Ho-Wop!"

== Commercial performance ==
Upon its release, the song debuted and peaked at number one on the UK Singles Chart with first week sales of 80,000 copies, knocking Eamon's song off from number one and became the first answer song to reach number one in the United Kingdom. It finished as the tenth best selling song of 2004 in the United Kingdom. In Australia, it also peaked at number one on the ARIA Singles Chart, again knocking Eamon's song off, becoming the twenty-seventh best selling single in Australia that year.

The song charted within the top ten in Denmark, Germany, Ireland, and Norway. However, in the United States, it was not as successful, reaching number 63 on the US Billboard Hot 100. Frankee has not had another charting single, making her a one-hit wonder.

== Track listings and formats ==
FURB (F U Right Back)
No.	Title	Length
1.	"F U Right Back" (House radio edit)	4:30
2.	"F U Right Back" (instrumental)	3:23
3.	"F U Right Back" (edit)	3:17
4.	"F U Right Back" (Explicit mix)	3:17
5.	"F U Right Back" (Friday Night Posse remix)	5:48
6.	"F U Right Back" (Express Theory Broken mix)	5:02
7.	"F U Right Back" (Mix Factory remix)	6:09
8.	"F U Right Back" (Extra edit)	3:19
9.	"F U Right Back" (House mix)	4:28
Total length:		39:13

== Charts ==
=== Weekly charts ===
Chart (2004)	Peak position
Australia (ARIA)	1
Australian Urban (ARIA)	1
Austria (Ö3 Austria Top 40)	14
Belgium (Ultratop 50 Flanders)	12
Belgium (Ultratip Bubbling Under Wallonia)	1
Denmark (Tracklisten)	5
Europe (Eurochart Hot 100)	7
France (SNEP)	22
Germany (GfK)	8
Ireland (IRMA)	4
Netherlands (Dutch Top 40)	27
Netherlands (Single Top 100)	20
New Zealand (Recorded Music NZ)	14
Norway (VG-lista)	2
Scotland Singles (OCC)	1
Sweden (Sverigetopplistan)	33
Switzerland (Schweizer Hitparade)	15
UK Singles (OCC)	1
US Billboard Hot 100	63
US Hot R&B/Hip-Hop Singles & Tracks (Billboard)	71
US Mainstream Top 40 (Billboard)	29
US Rhythmic Top 40 (Billboard)	18

=== Year-end charts ===
Chart (2004)	Position
Australia (ARIA)	27
Australian Urban (ARIA)	15
Belgium (Ultratop 50 Flanders)	80
Switzerland (Schweizer Hitparade)	93
UK Singles (OCC)	10

== Certifications and sales ==
Region	Certification	Certified units/sales
Australia (ARIA)	Platinum	70,000^{^}
United Kingdom (BPI)	Silver	280,000
^{^} Shipments figures based on certification alone.

== Release history ==
Region	Date	Format(s)	Label(s)	Ref.
United States	March 15, 2004	Digital download	Marro	
United Kingdom	May 10, 2004	12-inch vinyl; CD	All Around the World	
Denmark	May 24, 2004	CD	Epic	
Australia	June 7, 2004	CD	Epic	
