= I Love Them Ho's (Ho-Wop) =

Single by Eamon

from the album I Don't Want You Back
- Released: July 26, 2004
- Length: 2:27
- Label: Jive Records
- Songwriters: Eamon Doyle, Kirk Robinson, Harry Warren, Al Dubin
- Producers: Milk Dee, Eamon (co-producer)

Eamon singles chronology
"Fuck It (I Don't Want You Back)" (2003)	"I Love Them Ho's (Ho-Wop)" (2004)	"(How Could You) Bring Him Home" (2006)

"I Love Them Ho's (Ho-Wop)" is a song by American singer and songwriter Eamon. The song was released on July 26, 2004 as the second single from his debut album, I Don't Want You Back. The song was written by Eamon Doyle and Kirk Robinson, who sampled a song by the Flamingos, "I Only Have Eyes for You", which was written by Harry Warren and Al Dubin. Milk Dee produced the Eamon recording. The single version of the song, featuring Ghostface Killah, has charted in Australia, Austria, Belgium, Germany, Switzerland and the United Kingdom.

== Track listing ==
Digital download
No.	Title	Length
1.	"I Love Them Ho's" (feat. Ghostface Killah)	3:15
2.	"F**k It (I Don't Want You Back)" (Georgie's Anthem Mix)	7:09
3.	"F**k It (I Don't Want You Back)" (Teri & Tod's Speak and Spell Remix)	8:08
4.	"F**k It (I Don't Want You Back)" (F**ked Dub)	6:06
5.	"F**k It (I Don't Want You Back)" (Giuseppe Mix)	6:46

== Chart performance ==
=== Weekly charts ===
Chart (2004)	Peak position
Australia (ARIA)	24
Australian Urban (ARIA)	9
Austria (Ö3 Austria Top 40)	51
Belgium (Ultratip Bubbling Under Flanders)	7
Germany (GfK)	55
Ireland (IRMA)	29
Scotland Singles (OCC)	31
Switzerland (Schweizer Hitparade)	22
UK Singles (OCC)	27
UK Hip Hop/R&B (OCC)	8

== Release history ==
Region	Date	Format	Label
United States	July 26, 2004	Digital download	Jive Records
