= 2001 Oldham riots =

May 2001 conflict in the United Kingdom

- Date: 26–28 May 2001
- Location: Oldham, England
- Caused by: Ethnic conflict
- Methods: Rioting, vandalism

Parties
White British	South Asian British

The Oldham riots were a brief period of violent rioting which occurred in Oldham, a town in Greater Manchester, England, in May 2001. They were ethnically motivated riots and the worst riots in the United Kingdom since 1990 (the riots in 1990 were about the Poll Tax and were not ethnically motivated).

The Oldham riots were the first of a series of major riots during summer 2001, which saw similar ethnic conflicts follow in Bradford, Leeds and Burnley. They followed a long period of ethnic tensions and attacks in Oldham, occurring particularly between groups of the local White and South Asian communities.

The most violent rioting occurred in the Glodwick area of the town, a multi-ethnic district of Oldham and home to a large community of British Pakistanis.

== Riots ==
The racial riots took place throughout Oldham and a small part of neighbouring Chadderton, peaking on Saturday, 26 May 2001, and continuing on Sunday 27, and Monday, 28 May 2001. They were particularly intensive in Glodwick, an area to the south-east of Oldham town centre. They were highly violent and led to the use of petrol bombs, bricks, bottles and other such projectiles by up to five-hundred Asian youths as they battled against lines of riot police. At least 20 people were injured in the riots, including fifteen officers, and 37 people were arrested. Other parts of Oldham such as Coppice and Westwood were also involved.

Asians - including those of Pakistani, Bangladeshi and Indian heritage - made up 11% of Oldham's population, but constituted around 2% of the workforce at the local council, the town's biggest employer at the time. The rate of mixed race marriage in the town was less than 1%. Most Oldham primary schools were single race, and many secondaries were 99% White or 99% Asian.

On Saturday 26 May, the Live and Let Live pub, which was occupied at the time, was pelted with bricks, stones and petrol bombs. Several cars were set ablaze including an occupied police van. Lines of riot police were drafted in to combat the spiralling violence. Several officers were injured, and 32 police vehicles were damaged, but despite the level of violence and arson, there were no fatalities.

On 28 May 2001, the headquarters of the local newspaper, the Oldham Evening Chronicle, was attacked. A large group of Asian rioters threw a petrol bomb into the premises and smashed three plate-glass windows.

Just weeks after the riots, the then Deputy-Mayor of Oldham, Riaz Ahmad, became a victim of arson when someone threw a petrol bomb at his house in Chadderton, setting it ablaze. Mr. Ahmad, his wife and four children were all in the house sleeping at the time, but all escaped without any injuries.

The disturbances received extensive coverage from local, national and international media, including the BBC and other television networks and several tabloids and broadsheets.

== Causes ==
The exact causes of the Oldham riots are widely disputed, with blame being placed and denied by various groups. What is understood is that the riots stemmed from multiple causes and incidents, both historic and short-term.

=== Long-term causes ===
Oldham was once a thriving town, a spearhead of the Industrial Revolution and was said to be the cotton spinning capital of the world, producing at its peak some 13% of the entire world's cotton. However, economically, Oldham was very much dependent on this single industry, and following a depression in the British cotton industry due to increased foreign competition and the events of the two world wars, manufacture, affluence and employment opportunities steadily declined in the town during the first half of the 20th century. As such, Oldham became a relatively impoverished town, inhabited by people with non-transferable skills outside of mill work. In an attempt to keep the industry and the town alive, cotton did however continue to be spun to compete with foreign competition right up until 1989. Although cotton was produced in lesser quantities, it was under increasingly anti-social conditions (night-shifts and harder working conditions) and requiring manpower which was not as readily available as before the Second World War.

Because of this, after World War II ended, workers from the British Commonwealth were encouraged to migrate to Oldham, amongst other similarly industrialised English towns, to fill the shortfall of indigenous employees, and thus benefit from increased economic opportunity, albeit from tough unsociable employment regimes in a distinctly foreign land. These migrant groups, initially male Caribbeans and Pakistanis, but later Bangladeshi (then East Pakistani), Indian, Caribbean, and Pakistani families began to arrive in considerable numbers in the 1960s, settling throughout the Metropolitan Borough of Oldham. However, due to the comparatively poor circumstances with which they arrived in Britain, these migrants settled in concentrated neighborhoods, inhabiting the poorest of Oldham's then crumbling Victorian residential areas - most of which have since been redeveloped.

As a prosperous thriving centre of the industrial revolution, Oldham had always been a town attracting migrants (from wider-England, Scotland, Ireland, and following the world wars, Poland and Ukraine). However, the South Asian communities which settled remained culturally very distinct from the local population, in dress, language, religion, customs and, pertinently, in ethnicity/colour, much more so than previous migrant groups.

These factors contributed heavily to the foundations of Oldham's concentrated and sizeable Asian communities, which make up around 12% of the Borough's population, with Glodwick and more recently Clarksfield becoming a strong Pakistani community, and Westwood and Coldhurst likewise becoming home to a large Bangladeshi community.

These communities became very marginalised within a town of poor education and hostile working-class ethics. Derogatory racist language was often used to describe the migrants who had arrived, who in turn kept their mother-tongue language and stayed as a close-knit cultural community. Inter-ethnic relationships, marital, friendly or otherwise, were seen as highly undesirable and very much frowned upon by both communities for several reasons, including not only ethnicity but religion.

Several assumptions rose to mythical status in the town during the forty-year period between the first Asian migration and the Oldham Riots. Many Asians believed that areas such as Sholver, Abbeyhills, Limeside, and Fitton Hill were no-go areas for them in a similar way that the White community in Oldham feared attack should they be found in the vicinity of Glodwick, Clarkesfield and Westwood, and that the council was racist, holding back the socio-economic development of Asians. This was verified in the Ritchie report, where numerous instances of zones marked with Whites-only graffiti were reported. The report notes, however, that no institutional decree to such an effect was issued.

Many members of the White community believed that more council tax money was spent serving Asian needs, such as mosque building, in substitution for providing for White needs, although over the previous six years, the majority of regeneration grants had gone into White areas: Westwood and Glodwick received £16 million in 1995/96, whereas Hathershaw and Fitton Hill - predominantly White areas - received £53 million. This myth was tagged as wholly untrue in The Ritchie Report. Some minority sects of the Asian community believed that the police were behind the instigation of the Oldham riots, and some in the White community believed that the flag of England was being removed by councillors, in favour of celebrating Asian cultural identity.

A review of the Oldham riots blamed deep-rooted segregation which authorities had failed to address for generations. Poverty and lack of opportunity was also blamed, with the Oldham wards of Alexandra, Werneth, Hollinwood and Coldhurst in the 5% most deprived in the country, in addition to a further three wards in the 10% most deprived wards overall.

=== Mid-term causes ===
In the year leading up to the riots, there were 572 reported ethnicity-related crimes in the Oldham area, and in 60% of these, White persons were recorded as being the victims. These figures alarmed both Asian and White communities, and led to the British National Party announcing it would contest the forthcoming general election, with its leader Nick Griffin to stand as a candidate for the constituency of Oldham West and Royton. The far-right National Front political party also announced its interest in the town, and the intent to provide its own candidates for election.

According to a BBC investigation team, much of the violence seen in Oldham was caused by poverty, social disadvantage and a high percentage of young males in the Oldham area. The media, which had little interest in Oldham prior to the troubles, began a period of increased reporting from the area, with the local media such as the Oldham Evening Chronicle, and the Oldham Advertiser placing race-related stories on front page spreads.

Prime Minister Tony Blair blamed the riots on the "bad and regressive motive of White extremists" and condemned the actions of the National Front and the British National Party in the Oldham area as inflammatory to the violence.

=== Short term causes ===
In the days and weeks before the riots, several violent and racist disturbances occurred in Oldham, which are attributed to provoking the riots.

- Glodwick, an area south-central to Oldham town had become increasingly ethnically polarised. The area which is predominantly home to people of Pakistani origin had been for many years a no-go area for local White people for fear of possible attacks, a problem highlighted by a Today report on BBC radio. Although this label was challenged by community leaders as a purely minority view, this negative reputation still held at least five years after the original disturbances. Similarly, areas of predominantly and polarised White inhabited areas had the same perception as no-go to members of the Asian community. This was increasing tensions, and had been covered on the BBC North West Tonight programme by social-affairs reporter Dave Guest.
- On 21 April 2001, a mugging and attack upon 76-year-old White World War II veteran Walter Chamberlain by three Asian youths was amongst the first major provocations which led to the riots. Chamberlain was approached as he walked to his home after watching a local amateur rugby league match. He was mugged and badly beaten, receiving fractured bones in the face amongst other injuries. His battered face appeared on the front of the Manchester Evening News, and the story spread to all the major national newspapers. In the Daily Mirror, his face appeared under the headline "Beaten for being White: OAP, 76, attacked in Asian no-go area". Media pundits began to speculate on the apparent transformation of young Asian males - from the stereotype of hard-working boys, who respected their parents, to the new stereotype of angry, violent thugs. An Asian male (a Mr. Fokrul Islam) was ultimately charged for the crime of racially aggravated grievous bodily harm on 1 October 2001, some time after the riots. Chamberlain and his family, in an attempt to try to calm tensions in the borough, stated at the time that the mugging was just that, and not at all racially motivated. "It was a violent assault on an elderly man", said Chamberlain's son Steven. "As a family we don't think it was a race issue at all."
- Following a long period of ethnic-tensions, and the attack upon Chamberlain, the far-right National Front political party applied to the council on 26 April for permission to march and demonstrate in Oldham on 5 May. Permission was denied, with a three-month ban on public procession in Oldham put in place, aimed at keeping order and preventing a further increase in ethnic-tensions.
- Several racist skirmishes occurred in the town, including visiting football supporters from Stoke City F.C., who deliberately walked through multi-racial areas of the town before and after the match. Attacks followed, initially from Stoke City fans, and then more serious retaliatory attacks and petrol bomb throwing from local male Bangladeshi groups. Following this, on 5 May 2001, there was a day of mounting tension and run-ins between racist and anti-racist groups in the town. Up to fifty National Front supporters, mainly from Birmingham and London arrived in the town, clashing with members of the Anti-Nazi League and local Asian groups. Five hundred police were deployed, and the events received extensive media coverage.
- In the week before the Oldham riots, a number of racist incidents occurred at Breeze Hill School near Glodwick. Several White youths, some of whom were ex-pupils, approached the school, throwing stones and projectiles at the premises, and hurling racist abuse at the majority Asian pupils. Police were called for five consecutive days from 21 May 2001 to dissipate the disturbances, which were reported by the local press.

=== Immediate cause leading to riot ===
One largely shared and corroborated view of the events which led up to the riots on Saturday 26 May 2001, were the following, based upon eye-witness accounts, media interviews and police evidence:

- At 8 p.m., a fight occurred between one Asian youth and one White youth near the Good Taste chip shop on the corner of Salford Street and Roundthorn Road in Glodwick. Locals who witnessed the fight reported it included racist language from both sides and ended abruptly, but led to the hasty gathering of a gang of White youths assembled via mobile phone.
- Following this earlier fight between the two youths, further violence erupted as a gang of White men attacked an Asian business and threw a projectile through a window of a house in the Glodwick area, where a heavily pregnant Asian woman was in residence. Violence spiralled from this group as they rampaged through Glodwick attacking a number of persons and properties.
- Retaliatory violence soon followed, as large gangs of Asian men gathered and began to rally. Some of the earlier (but by then dissipating) group of White men were found and attacked. Further to this, a number of cars and commercial windows were also smashed in retaliation.
- The (White-owned) Live and Let Live pub was targeted and pelted with bricks, stones, bottles, and then petrol bombs. Cars were driven to block the fire exits, in an attempt to stop the patrons from escaping the flames, whilst vehicles in the surrounding roads were ignited, and police were called. Police officers were pelted by groups of Asian males. A night of violence began, and riot police were quickly drafted in to the Glodwick area, rife with both Pakistani and Bangladeshi rioters. Asians were angry with media coverage and police handling of the various incidents, and this may have intensified the riot.

== Ritchie Report ==
The Ritchie Report was a major review both of the Oldham Riots and the inter-ethnic problems that had long existed in the town. It was commissioned by the government, the Metropolitan Borough of Oldham and the local police authority. It was named after David Ritchie, Chairman of the Oldham Independent Review.

The report, published on 11 December 2001, was a 102-page document, addressed to the people of Oldham and was the sum total of much evidence gathering, including the interviewing of some 915 people and over 200 group meetings with local residents and governmental bodies.

The Ritchie Report largely blamed deep-rooted segregation, which authorities had failed to address for generations, as the cause of the Oldham Riots and its prior and subsequent inter-ethnic problems.

It warned: "Segregation, albeit self-segregation, is an unacceptable basis for a harmonious community and it will lead to more serious problems if it is not tackled".

== Sentencing ==
On 12 June 2003, 10 people were all jailed for nine months each after being convicted of their part in the rioting.

They were; Darren Hoy (aged 27 and from Fitton Hill district of the town), his sister Sharon Hoy (aged 38 and from the Raper Street neighbourhood), their cousin Matthew Berry (aged 25 and from the Limedale district of the town), James Clift (aged 24 and from Chadderton), Mark Priest (aged 32 and from Glossop in Derbyshire), Alan Daley (aged 38 and from Failsworth), David Bourne (aged 35 and from Limeside), Steven Rhodes (aged 30 and from the Medway Road neighbourhood), Paul Brockway (aged 39 and from Blackley) and 22-year-old Failsworth man Stephen Walsh. A 16-year-old boy and a 17-year-old girl were also convicted of involvement in the riot but avoided prison sentences, instead receiving a supervision order and conditional discharge, respectively.

Judge Jonathan Geake noted that none of the defendants were responsible for the rioting, and had directed the jury to clear the defendants of the charge of riot, before all 12 pleaded guilty to either affray or common assault.

== The Cantle Report ==
The Cantle Report was published coincidentally with the Ritchie Report in 2001 and was produced by an Independent Review Team appointed by the Home Secretary. The Team considered all of the disturbances in northern English towns, and created the concept of 'parallel lives' to describe the deep-seated segregation in the areas reviewed. It was not specific to Oldham and made recommendations for national and local government.

Subsequently, Ted Cantle led a team from the Institute of Community Cohesion (now iCoCo Foundation) to review the progress made since 2001. This 64-page Review was published on 25 May 2006, the eve of the fifth anniversary of the Oldham riots. It was commissioned by Oldham Metropolitan Borough Council to independently review the town's progress in its efforts to achieve racial harmony and community cohesion.

The report praised the council and town for its considerable progress and efforts, but said much more needed to be achieved, given Oldham's projected increase in ethnic diversity in the decades ahead. According to the report, the review teams were "struck by the extent to which divisions within and polarisation between Oldham's many communities continue to be a feature of social relations and the seeming reluctance of many sections of the community to embrace positive change".

The report broadly had three messages:

- "few cities, towns or districts in other parts of the country have done as much as Oldham in seeking to build community cohesion. In short, Oldham has every right to be proud of its record to date."
- "Segregation and divisions between Oldham's communities is still deeply entrenched."
- "If you want to change a community, the community must want to change."

In interviews with both the Oldham Evening Chronicle and BBC Radio, Cantle accused some community leaders of hindering progress because they were worried about losing their political influence. "We did find that a number of the communities, and particularly the community leaders were unwilling to get out of their comfort zones and that's a really big issue now".

== Legacy and impact ==
The legacy of the riots is broad and still in motion, but has seen increased ethnic-relations and some community-amenity improvements in the town, including the creation of a new Oldham Cultural Quarter (which includes the state-of-the-art Gallery Oldham and Oldham Library), and a number of proposed improvements and investments for the community facilities of the area.

The community facilities currently available in Oldham have been heavily criticised; however, as of 2016 a new ODEON cinema has been constructed in the town.

Some of the bodies and reports which proposed new community and amenity improvements included, Oldham Beyond (April 2004), Forward Together (October 2004), and The Heart of Oldham (May 2004).

Several men, mainly of Bangladeshi heritage were ultimately arrested and charged in connection to the riots.

Immediately after the Oldham Riots, the British National Party received an increase in the share of votes in both local and general elections; however, they have not won a seat to represent any part of the Metropolitan Borough of Oldham in the House of Commons or the Oldham Metropolitan Borough Council.

In the 2006 local elections, the BNP's share of votes decreased markedly, which was highlighted in The Cantle Report during the same year.

== See also ==
- 2001 Bradford riots
- British National Party
- Harehills Riot
- History of Oldham
- List of riots
- Moral panic
- Ethnic violence
- Race riot
- Riot control
- Social cohesion
