= I Don't Want You Back =

Studio album by Eamon
- Released: February 17, 2004
- Recorded: June–October 2003
- Studio: First Priority Labs; Battery Studios; (New York City)
- Genre: R&B
- Length: 48:55
- Label: Jive
- Producer: Milk Dee; Roy "Royalty" Hamilton

Eamon chronology
I Don't Want You Back (2004)	Love & Pain (2006)

Singles from I Don't Want You Back
- 1. "Fuck It (I Don't Want You Back)" Released: November 24, 2003; 2. "I Love Them Ho's (Ho-Wop)" Released: April 26, 2004

I Don't Want You Back is the debut album by American R&B singer Eamon, released in the United States on February 17, 2004. Produced by Milk Dee and Roy "Royalty" Hamilton, the album spawned two singles which combined modern hip hop with classic doo wop: "Fuck It (I Don't Want You Back)" and "I Love Them Ho's (Ho-Wop)". The album garnered a mixed reception from critics who found the production too predictable and the repeated profanity wearing. The album debuted at number seven on the Billboard 200 with first-week sales of 106,000 copies. It was certified Gold by the RIAA for selling over 500,000 copies.

== Reception ==
=== Critical reception ===
Professional ratings
Review scores
Source	Rating
AllMusic	2.5/5 stars
Blender	3/5 stars
Entertainment.ie	3/5 stars
The Guardian	2/5 stars
People	2.5/4 stars
Q	3/5 stars
Robert Christgau	(dud)
Rolling Stone	2/5 stars
Slant Magazine	2.5/5 stars
USA Today	1/4 stars

I Don't Want You Back received generally mixed reviews from music critics who found the production by-the-numbers and felt that his potty-mouth gimmick wore thin. Johnny Loftus of AllMusic found a lot of filler in the album but said that it is "still quite promising, especially with such a statement-making single." Entertainment.ie was mixed about the album's tracks with their depiction of women, concluding that "Eamon certainly has plenty of attitude and his album is undeniably good fun. But he also has a bit of growing up to do." Rob Kemp of Rolling Stone said he saw promise in Eamon through the album's competent R&B production and the track "I Love Them Ho's (Ho-Wop)," concluding that "you wonder if this modestly gifted kid has something special inside him that perhaps Kanye West or R. Kelly could coax out."

Sal Cinquemani of Slant Magazine found Eamon's talent on the album limited, saying that the tracks that don't mix his dirty mouth with Motown and doo-wop melodies aren't "clever or well-constructed enough to transcend the misogyny and double-standards put on whorish display." Despite praising Eamon's vocals, the album's beats and guest rap appearances, Caroline Sullivan of The Guardian found the swearing crooner gimmick throughout the album wearing thin before it even ended. Robert Christgau graded the album as a "dud", indicating "a bad record whose details rarely merit further thought." Elysa Gardner of USA Today criticized the album for its lack of humor or irony throughout the tracklist, saying that "Eamon makes Eminem look like a standard-bearer for feminists."

=== Commercial performance ===
The album debuted at number seven on the Billboard 200 with first-week sales of 106,000 copies. It dropped to number nine in its second week with sales dropping 31% to 73,000 copies. It was certified Gold by the RIAA and sold 591,000 copies as of June 2006.

== Track listing ==
No.	Title	Writer(s)	Producer(s)	Length
1.	"Intro" (featuring Al Trautwig)	Eamon Doyle; Mark Passy	M. Passy	0:15
2.	"I Love Them Ho's (Ho-Wop)"	E. Doyle; Kirk Robinson; Al Dubin; Harry Warren	Milk Dee; Eamon*	2:27
3.	"Somethin' Strange" (featuring Rap Legend Milk Dee)	E. Doyle; K. Robinson	Milk Dee; M. Passy	3:04
4.	"On & On"	E. Doyle; K. Robinson; Yared Williams	Milk Dee; Y. Williams	3:27
5.	"Fuck It (I Don't Want You Back)"	E. Doyle; K. Robinson; M. Passy	Milk Dee	3:45
6.	"Get off My Dick!" (featuring Rap Legend Milk Dee)	E. Doyle; K. Robinson; Y. Williams	Milk Dee	3:42
7.	"Girl Act Right"	E. Doyle; Roy Hamilton	R. Hamilton	3:05
8.	"My Baby's Lost"	E. Doyle; K. Robinson; Y. Williams	Milk Dee; Eamon*	2:59
9.	"I Want You So Bad"	E. Doyle; K. Robinson; M. Passy	Milk Dee; M. Passy	3:30
10.	"4 the Rest of Your Life"	E. Doyle; K. Robinson; Y. Williams	Milk Dee; Y. Williams	4:06
11.	"All Over Love"	Y. Williams; A. Brito	Y. Williams; Milk Dee*	3:16
12.	"Controversy"	E. Doyle; Y. Williams	Y. Williams; Milk Dee*	3:54
13.	"Lo Rida" (featuring N.O.R.E.)	E. Doyle; Y. Williams; Victor Santiago	Y. Williams	4:00
14.	"I'd Rather Fuck with You"	E. Doyle; Bootsy Collins; George Clinton Jr.; Gary Cooper; Eazy-E	R. Hamilton	3:25
15.	"Finally"	E. Doyle; V. Jeffrey Smith	Milk Dee; V. Jeffrey Smith	4:00

- (*) Denotes co-producer.

Sample credits

- "I Love Them Ho's (Ho-Wop)", samples "I Only Have Eyes For You" performed by The Flamingos, and written by Al Dubin and Harry Warren.
- "My Baby's Lost", samples "Top Billin'" performed by Audio Two, and written by Kirk Robinson.
- "I'd Rather Fuck with You", samples "I'd Rather Be With You" performed by Bootsy Collins, and written by Bootsy Collins, George Clinton Jr. and Gary Cooper and "I'd Rather Fuck You" performed by N.W.A., and written by Eazy-E.

== Personnel ==
Adapted from the I Don't Want You Back liner notes.

- Nat Robinson: executive producer
- Dave Kutch: mastering
- Crissy Gomez: make up artist
- Michelle 10: styling
- Anthony Cutajar: Milk Dee image
- Daniel Hastings: photography, art direction and graphic design

== Charts ==
=== Weekly charts ===
Chart (2004)	Peak position
Australian Albums (ARIA)	34
Australian Urban Albums (ARIA)	6
Austrian Albums (Ö3 Austria)	21
Belgian Albums (Ultratop Flanders)	60
Belgian Albums (Ultratop Wallonia)	74
Danish Albums (Hitlisten)	25
Dutch Albums (Album Top 100)	22
French Albums (SNEP)	52
German Albums (Offizielle Top 100)	13
Irish Albums (IRMA)	27
Italian Albums (FIMI)	19
New Zealand Albums (RMNZ)	16
Portuguese Albums (AFP)	18
Scottish Albums (OCC)	12
Swedish Albums (Sverigetopplistan)	30
Swiss Albums (Schweizer Hitparade)	17
UK Albums (OCC)	6
UK R&B Albums (OCC)	3
US Billboard 200	7
US Top R&B/Hip-Hop Albums (Billboard)	3

=== Year-end charts ===
Chart (2004)	Position
UK Albums (OCC)	149
US Billboard 200	134
US Top R&B/Hip-Hop Albums (Billboard)	68

== Certifications ==
Region	Certification	Certified units/sales
United Kingdom (BPI)	Gold	100,000^{^}
United States (RIAA)	Gold	591,000
^{^} Shipments figures based on certification alone.
