= Mizz (magazine) =

Defunct British teen magazine

- Frequency: Monthly (fortnightly until 2012)
- First issue: April 1985; 40 years ago
- Final issue: 2013; 12 years ago
- Company: IPC Media (1985 - March 2006); Panini UK (March 2006)
- Country: United Kingdom
- Website: themizz.co.uk

Mizz Magazine was a monthly magazine published in the United Kingdom, and was aimed at teenage and pre-teen girls (usually to those between the ages of 11 and 14).

== History ==
Mizz was first published in April 1985. In March 2006 the magazine was sold by IPC Media to Panini UK. The magazine was published on a fortnightly basis until 2012 when its frequency was changed to monthly.

In 2012 online version of Mizz was started. However, the magazine folded in 2013.

== Magazine sections ==
=== Say What? ===
Mizz readers could post comments in this section of the magazine. They usually talked about celebrities, brilliant sections of the magazine or stuff that they really like. A Star Letter was chosen every fortnight. The writer of the Star Letter used to get a T-shirt. You could also post "text messages" and say "hi" to your friends. Other sections of the Say What? section were "Get It Or Regret It" section which show items that the editor likes, a "Top Pet" section which readers show their pets and a "Sizzlin and Fizzlin" section. You could send Mizz your say by email, text or letter.

=== Real life ===
In the real life section, every issue showed a different story that someone has shared, about something "crazy, dramatic or unusual", usually there was a story about someone being hurt or a terrible experience. For example, in issue 652 the real life was "I'll never walk again".

=== Fashion ===
Mizz incorporated pages of fashion; displaying clothing trends, using models ranging from 12 to 16 years old. It encouraged its readers to write in about events in their life, varying from serious to comic issues. It also contained information about celebrities in a 'gossip' form. The magazine also included information on how to deal with teenage issues related to puberty, hygiene, friends and relationships. It had a range of competitions and quizzes and posters. It often came with freebies.
