= Oldham Evening Chronicle =

English daily newspaper

- Type: Daily newspaper
- Owner(s): Hirst Kidd and Rennie
- Editor: David Whaley
- Founded: 1854
- Ceased publication: 31 August 2017; relaunched online in February 2018
- Headquarters: Oldham; Greater Manchester; England
- Website: www.oldham-chronicle.co.uk

The Oldham Evening Chronicle was a daily newspaper published each weekday evening. It served the Metropolitan Borough of Oldham, in Greater Manchester, England. There were also four sister editions, called the Oldham Extra, Saddleworth Extra, Tameside Extra and Dale Times, which were published on the first Thursday of each month. The paper was owned by Hirst, Kidd and Rennie Ltd.

In February 2018, the main Evening Chronicle title relaunched online after it was bought by a local radio station.

== History ==
On 6 May 1854, the first edition of the Oldham Chronicle (as it was originally known) was published by a bookseller and printer Daniel Evans in an effort to provide the then thriving cotton manufacturing town of Oldham with its own locally produced newspaper. Oldham was enjoying rapid economic expansion thanks to the Industrial Revolution, but local communities had to rely on Manchester papers for news about the town and surrounding districts. The Oldham Chronicle was published in an attempt to fill this gap. Five months later, he sold it to Robert Lewis Gerrie.

Gerrie died from consumption 18 months after his purchase. Jonathan Hirst and Wallace Rennie bought the paper in 1857 for £800, and members of the Hirst family continued to work for the newspaper until its demise. The last chairman was Philip Hirst, a great-great-grandson of Jonathan Hirst.

The paper went from strength to strength. The increase in popularity led to a decision in 1880 to produce a daily edition (Monday to Saturday). The weekly edition and the Oldham Evening Chronicle were published together until 1982, when the paid-for Oldham Chronicle became the free Chronicle Weekend. In 2010, Chronicle Weekend was separated into two free monthly editions, the Oldham Extra and the Saddleworth Extra. In 2012 the Oldham Evening Chronicle produced the first Eid festival supplement which was aimed at the significant BME community in Oldham. According to Paul Bagguley and Yasmin Hussain, the newspaper's editorial stance had been "widely seen as anti-Asian" around the time of riots in 2001.

== Closure and purchase ==
On 31 August 2017, it was announced that the newspaper had gone into administration after 163 years in print, resulting in the loss of 49 jobs. The final edition was published on that day.

In October 2017 it was announced that local radio station Revolution 96.2 had bought the title and assets of the newspaper with the intention of relaunching it. According to a spokesman, doing so would be a complex matter, in part because the paper had stored so much of its information in the cloud and retrieving it might be difficult. The title relaunched as an online-only publication in February 2018.

== Former journalists ==
- Geoffrey Lancashire (1933-2004), television scriptwriter, notably on Coronation Street. Father of actress Sarah Lancashire.
- John Stapleton (1946-2025), journalist and broadcaster, known for GMTV and Watchdog.

== See also ==
- Oldham Advertiser
- List of newspapers in the United Kingdom
