= Manningham riot =

1995 ethnic riot in Bradford, England

Coordinates: 53.808°N 1.777°W

- Date: 9 June 1995 – 11 June 1995
- Location: Manningham, Bradford, England
- Methods: Rioting, petrol bombing, looting

Parties
West Yorkshire Police	British Pakistanis

Number
9 June – 100; 10 June – 600; 11 June – <300	9 June – <60; 10 June – 1,000; 11 June – unknown

The Manningham riot was a short but intense period of ethnic rioting which took place from 9–11 June 1995, in the district of Manningham in Bradford, West Yorkshire, England.

== Unrest ==
A series of widely publicised riots and racial disturbances have occurred in this part of Bradford since the early 1990s, which have often been attributed to the segregation that has been identified between the various ethnic groups present in the city mainly the white British and the British Pakistanis. The riot of summer 1995 was limited to a relatively confined area of the city, but was seen as indicative of the circumstances which led to the later and more widespread 2001 Bradford riots.

The rioting started after someone complained to police about two boys playing football in the street. When officers arrived, the two youths refused to move on and were detained for what was seen as a very minor infraction and not given police until some time later. The families of the two boys went to the police to protest and the situation deteriorated from there: 100 West Yorkshire Police officers were called in to help quell the trouble. Other witness reports stated that the police had attempted to arrest and then successfully detained two youths who were in a crowd. One of the arrestees had entered a house and when the police gained entry, an allegation of an assault by the police against a woman with a baby was made. The rioting that followed was estimated to have involved around 60 people.

Another version of the catalyst to the rioting was when a crowd of 30 youths had gathered outside the Jamiyat Tablighul Islam mosque after Friday prayers. The police had tried to arrest one and his friends came to support him with the situation quickly escalating.

The second night of the rioting (10 June 1995) saw rioters gathering around the Oak Lane police station in the city after peace talks between the police and the local community had broken down. At around 7:00 pm, the station was petrol bombed and stones were thrown with most windows in the station being smashed. Police had managed to disperse the crowd before trouble flared again at 9:00 pm.

More rioting followed on 12 June with 300 police officers deployed on the streets with the rioting fizzing out after the Sunday. Over the course of the weekend, police made 21 arrests and numerous others on both sides had ended up in hospital with injuries. Assistant Chief Constable Norman Bettison, of West Yorkshire Police, stated that he saw a "..community tearing itself apart," and that "the youths seem to be rising up as much against society and elders as against the police. The police are the anvil youth is beating out its frustration and anger on. Youth seems to be alienated from every conceivable part of the community from which it is drawn."

Two weeks later, eight men who had been arrested during the riot had charges against them dropped by the Crown Prosecution Service. Four men from the original arrest which sparked the riot remained on police bail.
