= Alibi (duo) =

English dance music duo

- Origin: England
- Genres: Dance
- Years active: 1996–1998
- Labels: Arista; BMG
- Past members: Jud Mahoney; Kye Mahoney

Alibi were an English dance music duo which consisted of Jud and Kye Mahoney. Three of their singles charted on the UK Singles Chart from 1997–1998.

After Alibi, Jud Mahoney became a songwriter and producer for artists such as Liberty X, Naomi, 911, Peter Andre, Shawn Desman, Eamon, and Tyrese. Jud also worked with Michael Jackson, Jimmy Jam & Terry Lewis, Brandy and Britney Spears.

== Discography ==
- "Sexual Healing" (Marvin Gaye cover) (1996)
- "I'm Not to Blame" (1997) - UK #51
- "You Got It" (1997) - UK #77
- "How Much I Feel" (Ambrosia cover) (1998) - UK #58
