= Salford City Radio =

Swinton; England
- Broadcast area: Salford
- Frequency: 94.4 FM
- RDS: SALFORD

Programming
- Format: Community radio

History
- First air date: 30 September 2007

Links
- Website: www.salfordcityradio.org

Salford City Radio is a community radio station based in Salford, Greater Manchester. It launched in September 2007 after securing a five-year FM licence to broadcast full-time on 94.4 MHz. The station broadcasts a mixture of community news, music and talk shows from its base at Salford Civic Centre in Swinton. In 2017 its licence was renewed until 2022.
