= Ouseley Report =

The Ouseley Report, dated July 2001, by the former chairman of the Commission for Racial Equality, Herman, Lord Ousely, gave a long-awaited response to race relations in Bradford of West Yorkshire, in Northern England. The report painted a picture of racial segregation and a deep-rooted concern about crime. Its publication coincided with the Bradford 2001 riots, but was in fact carried out months before 7 July, when the rioting broke out.

The report noted that Bradford had strong divisions along racial, ethnic and religious lines, reinforced by segregated schooling. This had resulted in communities deeply ignorant of each other, leading to mutual resentment: "Different cultural communities believe they get nothing while others get all the benefits". Lord Ouseley said this needed to be tackled with strong civic leadership, more effective communication, and a strengthening of partnerships between community groups. The report also noted a widespread fear of crime and violence which West Yorkshire Police had insufficiently tackled for fear of being branded racist. This had resulted in several Asian gangs, who were generally considered "untouchable".

== See also ==
- Bradford riots
- Cohesion (social policy)
- Ray Honeyford
