= Fuck It (I Don't Want You Back) =

2003 single by Eamon

Single by Eamon

from the album I Don't Want You Back
- Released: November 10, 2003
- Length: 3:45
- Label: Jive
- Songwriters: Eamon Doyle; Kirk Robinson; Mark Passy
- Producer: Milk Dee

Eamon singles chronology
"Fuck It (I Don't Want You Back)" (2003)	"I Love Them Ho's (Ho-Wop)" (2004)

Music video
- "Fuck It (I Don't Want You Back)" on YouTube

"Fuck It (I Don't Want You Back)", (Note: Appearing on the single cover and on Billboard magazine as "F**k It (I Don't Want You Back)".) known as "I Don't Want You Back" for the clean version, is a song by American singer-songwriter Eamon, released as his debut single. The song was co-written by Eamon, Kirk Robinson, and Mark Passy. It was released on November 10, 2003, as the lead single from Eamon's first album, I Don't Want You Back (2004). The song is notable for the frequency of its expletives.

"Fuck It (I Don't Want You Back)" topped the charts in many countries, including Australia, Belgium, Denmark, Germany, Italy, New Zealand, Sweden, and the United Kingdom. An Italian-language version titled "Solo" (English: "Alone") was also released, reaching number two in Italy.

== History ==
The success of the single "Fuck It (I Don't Want You Back)" and the controversial nature of its lyrics prompted production of an answer song, "F.U.R.B. (Fuck You Right Back)", by female singer Frankee, who claimed to be Eamon's ex-girlfriend. While Eamon initially said that he selected Frankee to record the song at an audition, he later stated that his only involvement was in clearing the use of the music with the following statement:

"I was not involved with 'F.U.R.B.' I have never met Frankee and she is definitely not my girlfriend or ex-girlfriend. The only way I was associated with it was when I was asked for licensing permission by Frankee's representatives, which makes me a writer on her song by copyright law. But I really didn't expect all this to come out of it, they are having fun with it, it's cool but in the end they are paying me for their 15 minutes of fame and I welcome her to my world of Ho-Wop!"

During the success of both songs in the United Kingdom, BBC Radio 1 host Chris Moyles was heavily critical of them, going as far as to record and broadcast his own spoof version; "We Want You to Leave", claiming that both singles were the product of what amounted to nothing more than a cynical marketing ploy by Eamon and Frankee's record labels.

Because of the great success of the song in Italy, an Italian version of the song was released. Its title was "Solo" and its lyrics, written by J-Ax, were changed so they did not contain any expression deemed offensive. "Solo" reached number two on the Italian Singles Chart and ended 2004 as the country's 32nd-best-selling hit.

The song reached number 1 in the Netherlands and even led to a parody song called "Vakkenvuller" by Dutch singer Hans Goes (using the alias 'Simon'), which was also a big hit.

== Music video ==
The video starts with black and white footage of Eamon and his girlfriend enjoying a trip together, then it cuts to color purporting to be present day outside at Bari's Pizza in Staten Island, New York. Eamon and his girlfriend are sitting across from one another while she tries to hold his hand he pushes her away while Eamon starts to argue with her. Eamon's girlfriend starts to well up with tears in her eyes while Eamon is singing.

A teardrop comes out of her left eye and drops into a puddle below, causing ripples to appear. The video then cuts to various couples on park benches then Its revealed that the argument that happened at the beginning was due to his girlfriend cheating on him because Eamon's friend called him to tell him that he saw his girlfriend kissing another man much to his outrage, Eamon in a sound recording booth singing the song, and Eamon in a room as he vents his frustrations by ripping up a picture to shreds and throws a wine bottle at the camera. Eamon stands with his back to the Brooklyn Bridge, singing. The video cuts back to Bari's Pizza showing the girl begging for forgiveness but Eamon refuses, as Eamon angrily throws the pizza on the ground and then gets up and walks away on a path and his girlfriend is left sobbing in despair.

The video ends with footage of them both kissing in black and white then cutting back to the present with Eamon walking along a pathway assuming that he broke up with his girlfriend.

== Track listing ==
=== Single version ===
Fuck It (I Don't Want You Back) – Single
No.	Title	Length
1.	"Fuck It (I Don't Want You Back)" (Explicit)	3:44
2.	"I Feel"	3:23
Total length:		7:07

=== EP version ===
Fuck It (I Don't Want You Back) – EP
No.	Title	Length
1.	"Fuck It (I Don't Want You Back)" (Dirty)	3:43
2.	"Fuck It (I Don't Want You Back)" (Georgie's Anthem Mix)	7:04
3.	"Fuck It (I Don't Want You Back)" (Giuseppe Mix)	6:41
4.	"Fuck It (I Don't Want You Back)" (FCM Remix)	3:25
Total length:		20:53

=== iTunes album version ===
Fuck It (I Don't Want You Back) – iTunes Album version
No.	Title	Length
1.	"Fuck It (I Don't Want You Back)"	3:44
2.	"I Don't Want You Back" (Clean Version)	3:45
3.	"Fuck It (I Don't Want You Back)" (Georgie's Anthem Mix)	7:04
4.	"Fuck It (I Don't Want You Back)" (Giuseppe Mix)	6:41
5.	"Fuck It (I Don't Want You Back)" (Fucked Dub)	6:01
6.	"Fuck It (I Don't Want You Back)" (Teri & Tod's Speak and Spell Remix)	8:04
7.	"Fuck It (I Don't Want You Back)" (FCM Remix)	3:27
Total length:		38:46

== Charts ==
=== Weekly charts ===
Chart (2004)	Peak position
Australia (ARIA)	1
Austria (Ö3 Austria Top 40)	1
Belgium (Ultratop 50 Flanders)	1
Belgium (Ultratop 50 Wallonia)	6
CIS Airplay (TopHit)	153
Croatia (HRT)	1
Czech Republic (IFPI)	1
Denmark (Tracklisten)	1
Europe (Eurochart Hot 100)	1
France (SNEP)	4
Germany (GfK)	1
Ireland (IRMA)	1
Italy (FIMI)	1
Italy (FIMI) Italian version: "Solo"	2
Netherlands (Dutch Top 40)	1
Netherlands (Single Top 100)	1
New Zealand (Recorded Music NZ)	1
Norway (VG-lista)	1
Poland (PiF PaF)	13
Romania (Romanian Top 100)	2
Russia Airplay (TopHit)	154
Scottish Singles Sales (Official Charts)	1
Sweden (Sverigetopplistan)	1
Switzerland (Schweizer Hitparade)	1
UK Singles (Official Charts)	1
Ukraine Airplay (TopHit)	139
US Billboard Hot 100	16
US Hot R&B/Hip-Hop Singles & Tracks (Billboard)	37
US Mainstream Top 40 (Billboard)	9
US Rhythmic Top 40 (Billboard)	5

=== Year-end charts ===
Chart (2004)	Position
Australia (ARIA)	5
Austria (Ö3 Austria Top 40)	5
Belgium (Ultratop 50 Flanders)	5
Belgium (Ultratop 50 Wallonia)	18
Europe (Eurochart Hot 100)	5
France (SNEP)	18
Germany (Media Control GfK)	4
Ireland (IRMA)	2
Italy (FIMI)	2
Italy (FIMI) Italian version: "Solo"	32
Netherlands (Dutch Top 40)	20
Netherlands (Single Top 100)	12
New Zealand (RIANZ)	3
Sweden (Hitlistan)	21
Switzerland (Schweizer Hitparade)	5
UK Singles (OCC)	2
US Billboard Hot 100	63
US Mainstream Top 40 (Billboard)	39
US Rhythmic Top 40 (Billboard)	32

=== Decade-end charts ===
Chart (2000–2009)	Position
Germany (Media Control GfK)	65
Netherlands (Single Top 100)	96
UK Singles (OCC)	57

== Certifications ==
Region	Certification	Certified units/sales
Australia (ARIA)	Platinum	70,000^{^}
Austria (IFPI Austria)	Gold	15,000^{*}
Belgium (BRMA)	Gold	25,000^{*}
Denmark (IFPI Danmark)	Gold	4,000^{^}
Germany (BVMI)	Platinum	300,000^{^}
New Zealand (RMNZ)	Platinum	10,000^{*}
Norway (IFPI Norway)	Platinum	10,000^{*}
Sweden (GLF)	Gold	10,000^{^}
Switzerland (IFPI Switzerland)	Gold	20,000^{^}
United Kingdom (BPI)	Platinum	600,000^{^}
United States (RIAA)	Gold	500,000^{^}
^{*} Sales figures based on certification alone.^{^} Shipments figures based on certification alone.

== Release history ==
Region	Date	Format(s)	Label(s)	Ref.
United States	November 10, 2003	Contemporary hit radio	Jive	
Australia	March 22, 2004	CD	Jive	
United Kingdom	April 12, 2004	12-inch vinyl; CD	Jive	
