= Oldham Advertiser =

English newspaper

- Type: Weekly newspaper
- Format: Tabloid
- Owner(s): Reach plc
- Editor: Martin Purdy
- Founded: 1982
- Headquarters: Manchester, England
- Circulation: 86,503 (Jan-Jul 2007)
- Price: Free to residents in the Oldham area, or £0.29 in stores
- Website: oldhamadvertiser.co.uk

The Oldham Advertiser is a weekly newspaper which serves the Metropolitan Borough of Oldham, Greater Manchester, England. Established in 1982, it is owned by Reach plc, as part of MEN Media which contains a collection of newspapers across North West England including the Manchester Evening News. In 2010, the then owners Guardian Media Group, decided to sell the Advertiser along with 22 other local and regional titles to Trinity Mirror plc.

== See also ==
- Oldham Evening Chronicle
