= 2001 Bradford riots =

Period of rioting in Bradford, England

- Date: 7–9 July 2001
- Location: Bradford, England; 53.776°N 1.714°W
- Caused by: Ethnic conflict
- Methods: Rioting, arson, vandalism

Parties
White youths British National Party; National Front	South Asian youths Anti-Nazi League	Law enforcement West Yorkshire Police

Casualties
- Injuries: 300+ police officers
- Arrested: 297

The Bradford riots were a brief period of violent rioting which began on 7 July 2001, in Bradford, West Yorkshire, England. They occurred as a result of heightened tension between the large and growing British Asian communities and the confrontation between the left wing Anti-Nazi League (ANL) and far-right groups such as the British National Party (BNP) and the National Front (NF). Similar ethnic riots had occurred earlier in other parts of Northern England, such as Oldham in May and Burnley in June.

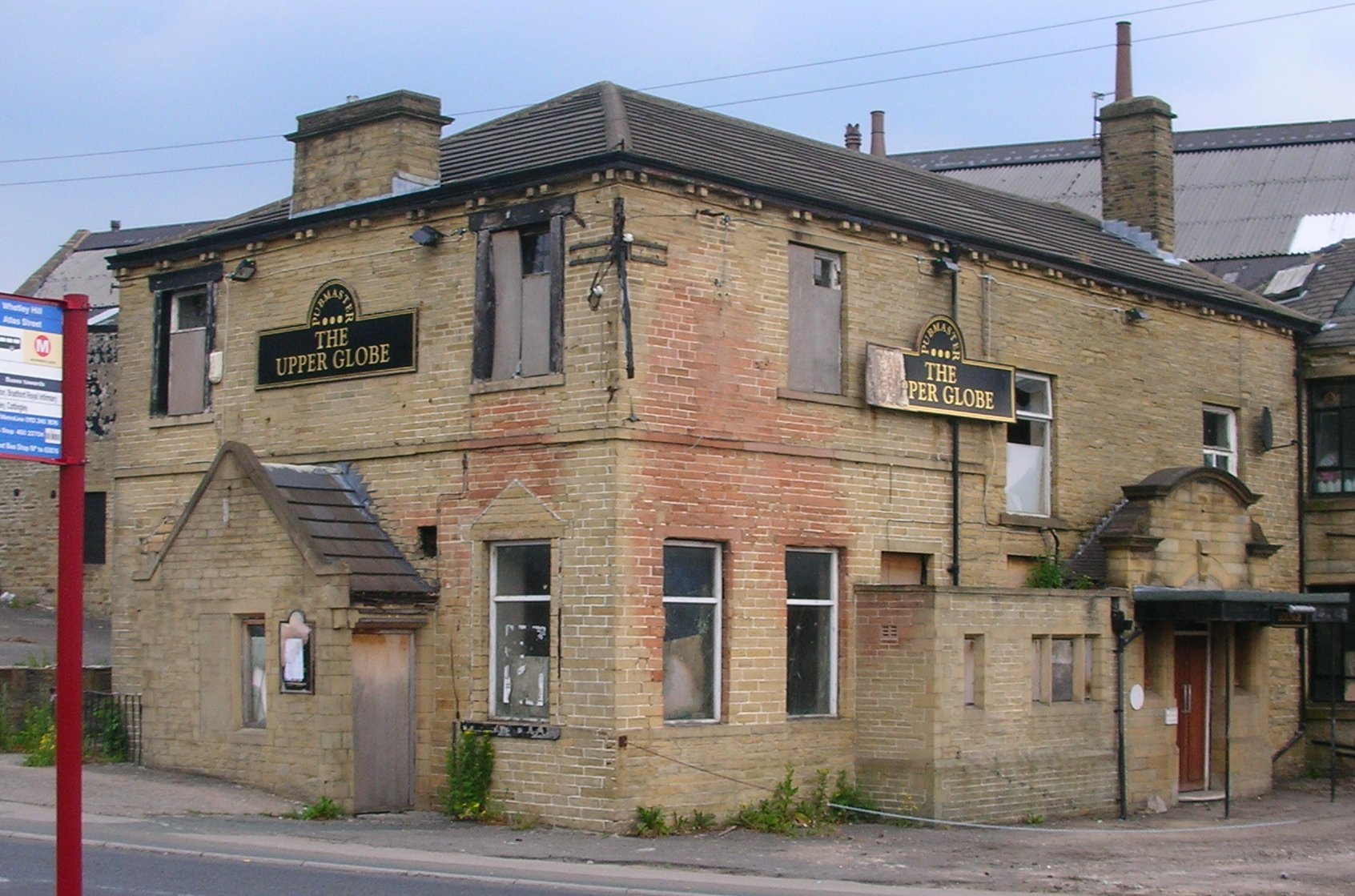
The Upper Globe pub was damaged and stood derelict for many years afterwards.

== Background ==
Bradford is historically a working class city. Since its rapid growth in the 19th century, there have been several significant waves of immigration, such as Irish (19th century), Poles (1940s–50s) and South Asian people since the 1950s.

At the time of the riot, Bradford had the second largest population of South Asians of any UK city, with approximately 68,000 Pakistanis, 12,500 Indians, 5,000 Bangladeshis and 3,000 other Asians. However, the majority of people in the city were white (Ethnicity: 78.3% White, and 19.1% S.Asian according to the 2001 census).

While the South Asian population in Bradford had grown, and there were areas which were still predominantly white and other areas which were predominantly South Asian, it is disputed whether segregation had grown over time, whether the phenomenon of white flight applies to Bradford, and whether one can accurately talk of ghettos in Bradford. At the time of the riot, Bradford Moor was 67% South Asian, Toller was 64% South Asian. Of the 17,512 people of Manningham 13,049 (74.5%) were South Asian. Tong was 93 per cent white, and Wibsey was 91 per cent white.

== Flashpoint ==
On 22–24 June, there were riots in Burnley; two months previously, there had been riots in Oldham. Tensions rose after the National Front attempted to organise a march in the city which was banned by Home Secretary David Blunkett under the Public Order Act 1986. The Anti-Nazi League organised a rally in Centenary Square in the centre of the city, which was allowed to proceed. During the course of the rally, held on Saturday 7 July, a rumour was spread by some of the marchers that National Front sympathisers were gathering at a pub in the centre of Bradford. A confrontation then occurred outside the pub in the city centre during which an Asian man was stabbed. According to the appeal court, this incident almost certainly triggered the riot. However, subsequent research amongst eyewitnesses contests this view with no single event being identifiable as a flashpoint.

== Riots ==
The riot was estimated to have involved 1,000 youths. On the nights of 8 and 9 July 2001, groups of between thirty and a hundred white youths attacked police and Asian-owned businesses, in the Ravenscliffe and Holmewood areas. Initially there were 500 police officers involved, but later reinforcements increased this to almost 1,000. The riot turned into an ethnic-related disturbance, with the targeting of businesses and cars, along with numerous attacks on shops and property. A notable point of the rioting was the firebombing of Manningham Labour Club, at the time a recreational centre. 23 people were trapped inside the Labour Club cellar during the fire but were later safely evacuated. A 48-year-old Asian businessman was jailed for 12 years for the arson attack.

The most expensive act of the riot was the arson attack of a BMW dealership, which had previously been attacked in a 1995 disturbance.

== Aftermath ==
More than 300 police officers were hurt during the riot. There were 297 arrests in total; 187 people were charged with the offence of riot, 45 with violent disorder and 200 jail sentences totalling 604 years were handed down. The last rioter was sentenced six-and-a-half years after the events. The number of convictions for riot was unprecedented in English legal history; the next highest amount was five for an investigation in London. The estimated damage was put at £7 million. The heaviest sentence handed out in connection with the riots was that of the aforementioned Mohammed Ilyas, a 48-year-old local businessman, who was found guilty of arson and being reckless as to whether life was endangered. He was sentenced to 12 years in prison on 3 July 2003.

The Ouseley Report released 7 March 2005 recommended a "people's programme" to bring harmony to the city. The government subsequently commissioned the Cantle Report which made 67 recommendations. In 2006 Channel 4 produced a non-fictional drama, Bradford Riots, directed by Neil Biswas. The film tells the story of 2001 riots from the perspective of an Asian family.

== See also ==
- List of riots

Similar sectarian violence:

- 2001 Oldham riots
- 2001 Harehills riot
- 2005 French riots
- 2005 Cronulla riots

Non-sectarian:

- 2008 Greek riots
