= Eamon (singer) =

American singer and songwriter

- Born: Eamon Doyle; September 19, 1983 (age 43) or September 19, 1984 (age 42); Staten Island, New York, U.S.
- Genres: R&B; hip hop
- Occupations: Singer, songwriter
- Years active: 2003–present
- Labels: Jive; First Priority; Huey Ave

Eamon Doyle (born September 19, 1983 or 1984), known mononymously as Eamon, is an American singer and songwriter. He is mainly known for his 2003 hit single "I Don't Want You Back".

== Early life ==
Eamon Doyle was born in Port Richmond, Staten Island, New York City, the son of Diane (née Zizzo), an Italian-American nurse, and Walter Doyle, a counselor with a private practice, of Irish descent. His father was a member of a doo-wop group named The Elations. He began singing at age nine and touring and performing with his father's group at the same age.

At age 15, while working in a music studio, he caught the attention of Nat Robinson, the CEO of "First Priority Music" who in turn entrusted Doyle to songwriter/producer Milk Dee, who had worked with musicians such as MC Lyte, Janet Jackson, and Mary J. Blige. Dee and his co-producer Mark Passy helped refine Eamon's sound. After Robinson shopped Eamon to over 22 different record labels he finally secured a record deal with record executive Barry Weiss and Eamon was eventually signed to Jive Records.

== Musical career ==
=== I Don't Want You Back (2003–2004) ===
Eamon's debut single, "Fuck It (I Don't Want You Back)" immediately caught the attention of urban, rhythmic, pop radio stations when it was released in the US in late 2003. Jive fast-tracked the release of a music video for the song and commissioned an album for release in early 2004. The single reached the top 20 of the Billboard Hot 100, and the popularity of the song helped his album, I Don't Want You Back, debut in the top ten of the Billboard 200.

The success of the song prompted Jive to release the song internationally, where it topped the charts in various countries, including Australia, Germany, the Netherlands, Sweden, and the United Kingdom. In the latter country, "Fuck It (I Don't Want You Back)" remained at the summit of the UK Singles Chart for four weeks and became Britain's second best-selling song of 2004. In Italy, the song was such a big hit that Eamon sang an Italian version called "Solo". The success of the single and the controversial nature of its lyrics prompted production of an answer single, "F.U.R.B. (Fuck You Right Back)", by then-unknown female singer Frankee who had claimed to be Eamon's ex-girlfriend (which Eamon denied). The song also earned Eamon a Guinness World Record for "the most expletives in a No. 1 song".

After the success of "Fuck It (I Don't Want You Back)", Eamon released a second single, "I Love Them Ho's (Ho-Wop)". The song did not match the success of its predecessor, although it was a top ten hit in Denmark, where it peaked at number seven on the Danish Singles Chart. "I Love Them Ho's (Ho-Wop)" also had a remix and video featuring fellow Staten Island resident Wu-Tang Clan's Ghostface Killah. In return Eamon appeared on Ghostface's album More Fish.

=== Love and Pain (2006) ===
On September 15, 2006, Eamon released his first single from his upcoming second studio album, Love & Pain, titled "(How Could You) Bring Him Home". Love & Pain was released on December 5, 2006. The album was produced by Happy Perez, Jeff Smith, and Milk Dee.

=== Later projects and Golden Rail Motel (2007–present) ===
Eamon and Jive Records parted ways in 2008. In 2011, Eamon signed with SMC Entertainment, a publicly traded independent record label. Eamon signed a two-album deal worth $1,000,000 and began recording with Grammy winning producer Mikal Blue (Colbie Caillat, Jason Mraz, OneRepublic). SMC was almost immediately delinquent on payments for musicians, studio costs, and advances. Eamon and Mikal Blue continued to record the album in spite of SMC not fulfilling their contractual obligation.

Legal action was taken at the end of 2012 to resolve the issue. At that point, SMC financial backer David Levy was arrested for stock fraud. It gave Eamon more leverage in the litigation, but not enough to get him out of his contract. Levy was later sentenced to nine years in prison in 2013. The album was finished in September 2012, and Eamon was still under contract with SMC, but could not release any music or perform for money. He could, however, collaborate with other artists.

Eamon joined forces with R.A. the Rugged Man on the rapper's 2013 album Legends Never Die. Eamon is featured on two songs: "Luv to Fuk" and "Still Get Through the Day". A video for "Still Get Through the Day" came out on February 4, 2014. In May 2014, SMC settled with Eamon to release him from his 360-record deal. Most of the album he recorded with Mikal Blue could not be sold or even made public, but Eamon became a free agent.

In 2015, Eamon appeared on the Jedi Mind Tricks' album The Thief and the Fallen. Again, he is featured on two songs: "Fraudulent Cloth" and "And God Said to Cain" (which also features A-F-R-O and R.A. the Rugged Man). A video for "Fraudulent Cloth" came out on May 27, 2015.

In 2016, he has appeared on a few more collaborations, including "The Void" on Vinnie Paz's solo project Cornerstone of the Corner Store, and "Use Them Blues" on the Afro & Marco Polo album A-F-R-O Polo.

On April 7, 2017, Eamon released the video for "Be My Girl", the lead single from his third album, Golden Rail Motel, which was released on September 15, 2017. On June 15, 2017, Eamon released the second single, "Before I Die", from the album. Golden Rail Motel was Eamon's first new album in over a decade and was produced by Eamon, Stoupe (Jedi Mind Tricks), Dan Ubick (Connie Price and the Keystones), Snipe Young, and Mikal Blue. On September 8, 2017, Eamon released the video for the third single "I Got Soul", which is a single-shot video directed by Doug Quill.

In August 2017, Vinnie Paz released the video for "The Ghost I Used to Be" featuring Eamon from Paz's solo album The Cornerstone of the Corner Store.

In June 2019, Eamon announced via Instagram that he would be releasing an EP and a song from the EP every week, which resulted in the singles "Runnin' Around" and "Step by Step".

== Personal life ==
Eamon has been married to his wife, Jessica, since May 14, 2016.

== Discography ==
=== Studio albums ===
List of studio albums, with selected chart positions, sales figures and certifications
Title	Album details	Peak chart positions										Sales	Certifications
Title	Album details	US	US R&B	AUS	AUT	GER	IRL	NLD	NZ	SWI	UK	Sales	Certifications
I Don't Want You Back	Released: February 14, 2004; Label: Jive, First Priority Music; Formats: CD, LP, digital download	7	3	34	21	13	27	22	16	17	6	US: 591,000	RIAA: Gold; BPI: Gold
Love & Pain	Released: December 5, 2006; Label: Jive; Formats: CD, LP, digital download	—	—	—	—	—	—	—	—	—	—		
Golden Rail Motel	Released: September 15, 2017; Label: Huey Ave Music; Formats: CD, LP, digital download	—	—	—	—	—	—	—	—	—	—		
"—" denotes a recording that did not chart or was not released in that territory.

=== Singles ===
List of singles, with selected chart positions and certifications, showing year released and album name
Title	Year	Peak chart positions										Certifications	Album
Title	Year	US	AUS	AUT	BEL (FL)	GER	NLD	NZ	SWE	SWI	UK	Certifications	Album
"Fuck It (I Don't Want You Back)"	2003	16	1	1	1	1	1	1	1	1	1	RIAA: Gold; ARIA: Platinum; BEA: Gold; BPI: Gold; BVMI: Platinum; IFPI AUT: Gold; IFPI SWE: Gold; IFPI SWI: Gold; RMNZ: Platinum	I Don't Want You Back
"I Love Them Ho's (Ho-Wop)"	2004	—	24	51	57	55	—	—	—	22	27		I Don't Want You Back
"(How Could You) Bring Him Home"	2006	—	—	—	—	—	—	—	—	—	61		Love & Pain
"Be My Girl"	2017	—	—	—	—	—	—	—	—	—	—		Golden Rail Motel
"—" denotes a recording that did not chart or was not released in that territory.

Other singles

- 2017: "Before I Die"
- 2017: "I Got Soul"
- 2018: "You and Only You"
- 2018: "Greatest Mistake"
- 2019: "Born and Bred"
- 2019: "Runnin' Around"
- 2019: "Step by Step"

=== Other releases ===
- 2004: Solo (Italian version of "Fuck It")
- 2004: My Baby's Lost (Like That) (promo EP)
- If Everyone Believed (feat. David Phelps)
- 2006: Fuck It – EP (with Jesse Saunders)
- Eamon vs. Frankee (LP)
