= List of people from Birmingham =

This is a list of famous or notable people born in Birmingham, the demonym is Brummies.

== Famous people born in Birmingham ==
=== A–F ===
- Troy Deeney (born 1988) - footballer, columnist
- Scott Adkins (born 1987) – actor, gymnast
- Gabriel Agbonlahor (born 1986) – footballer
- Moeen Ali (born 1987) – England cricketer
- Dennis Amiss (born 1943) – cricketer and Warwickshire administrator
- Tomás Ángel (born 2003) – footballer
- Keith Arkell (born 1961) – English chess champion, 2008
- Stephen Arlen (1913–1972) – opera manager
- Ian Ashbee (born 1976) – footballer
- Francis William Aston (1877–1945) – Nobel Prize winner, physicist
- Ian Atkins (born 1957) – footballer
- Albert Austin (1882–1953) – silent film star
- Jack Badham (1919–1992) – footballer
- Annette Badland (born 1951) – actress
- Kenny Baker (1934–2016) – actor
- Pato Banton (born 1961) – reggae artist
- Dave Barnett (born 1967) – footballer
- Simon Bates (born 1946) – radio DJ
- Blaze Bayley (born 1963) – musician, vocalist of Wolfsbane and Iron Maiden
- Ian Bell (born 1982) – England cricketer, Warwickshire CCC captain
- Jude Bellingham (born 2003) – footballer
- Moazzam Begg (born 1968) – outreach director
- Edward White Benson (1829–1896) – Archbishop of Canterbury
- Bev Bevan (born 1944) – musician
- Alfred Bird (1811–1878) – inventor of custard powder
- Sir Alfred Frederick Bird (1849–1922) – food manufacturer and chemist
- William Bloye (1890–1975) – sculptor
- Tom Blyth (born 1995) – actor
- Elizabeth Baker Bohan (1849–1930) – author, journalist, artist, social reformer
- Daniel Boone (1942–2023) – musician
- Sarah Booth (1793–1867) – actress
- Matthew Boulton (1728–1809) – pioneering industrialist and member of the Lunar Society
- Jon Bounds (born 1975) – blogger, humorist
- Paul Braddon (1864–1937) – artist
- Peter Bradley (born 1953) – politician
- William Bragge (1823–1884) – civil engineer/antiquarian
- Tony Britton (1924–2019) – actor
- James Jaysen Bryhan (born 1978) – actor
- Dan Bull (born 1986) – musician/ YouTuber
- Edward Burne-Jones (1833–1898) – Pre-Raphaelite painter and William Morris Associate
- Trevor Burton (born 1949) – musician
- Geezer Butler (born 1949) – bassist, Black Sabbath
- George Cadbury (1839–1922) – son of John Cadbury, founder of the Cadbury chocolate company
- John Cadbury (1801–1889) – founder of the Cadbury chocolate company
- Richard Cadbury (1835–1899) – son of John Cadbury, founder of the Cadbury chocolate company
- Pogus Caesar (born 1953) – television director, photographer
- Daniel Caines (born 1979) – track and field athlete
- Ali Campbell (born 1959) and Robin Campbell (born 1954) – musician (UB40)
- Duncan Campbell (born 1958) – musician
- David Cannadine (born 1950) – historian
- Bob Carolgees (born 1948) – television presenter (Tiswas and Surprise Surprise)
- Lee Carsley (born 1974) – footballer
- Darren Carter (born 1983) – footballer
- John Carter (born 1940) – musician
- Barbara Cartland (1901–2000) – novelist
- Jasper Carrott (born 1945) – comedian
- Austen Chamberlain (1863–1937) – politician
- Neville Chamberlain (1869–1940) – Prime Minister
- Gary Childs (born 1964) – footballer
- Paul Child (born 1952) – footballer who represented the United States national team
- Adrian Chiles (born 1967) – broadcaster
- Carl Chinn (born 1956) – historian, broadcaster
- Charlie Christodoulou (c. 1951–1976) – soldier and mercenary
- Ian Clarkson (born 1970) – footballer
- Lisa Clayton (born 1958) – solo yachtswoman
- Janice Connolly (born 1954) – comedy actress
- Raymond Teague Cowern (1913–1986) – artist
- Edward Cowie (born 1943) – composer
- Andy Cox (born 1956) – ska guitarist (Fine Young Cannibals and The Beat)
- David Cox (1783–1859) – artist
- Lauren Crace (born 1986) – actress
- Sarah Crompton (1802–1881) – children's writer
- Miguel Cunningham (born 1997), British rapper
- John Curry (1949–1994) – Olympic and World Champion figure skater
- Nigel Dakin (born 1964) – soldier, diplomat and Governor of the Turks and Caicos Islands
- Richard Dandy (born 1977) – former cricketer
- Fanny Dango (1878–1972) – comedienne, actress and singer
- Arthur Darvill (born 1982) – actor and singer
- Aidan Davis (born 1997) – dancer and television presenter
- Lindsey Davis (born 1949) – historical novelist
- Cat Deeley (born 1976) – television presenter
- Nathan Delfouneso (born 1991) – footballer
- Oscar Deutsch (1893–1941) – founder of the Odeon Cinemas chain
- Fred Dinenage (born 1942) – presenter, broadcaster, writer
- Stefflon Don (born 1991) – musician
- Don Dorman (1922–1997) – paratrooper, 1st Airborne Division, footballer, manager and scout
- K.K. Downing (born 1951) – musician
- Mark Duffus (born 1967) – musician (stage name Sure Shot)
- Pete Dunne (born 1993) – professional wrestler
- Dutchavelli (born 1993) – rapper
- Jessie Eden (1902–1986) – Communist activist and trade union leader
- Arthur Edwards (1863–1927) – architect
- Duncan Edwards (1936–1958) – footballer for Manchester United, one of the Busby Babes (died in Munich air disaster)
- Fabian Edwards (born 1993) – professional mixed martial artist, brother of Leon Edwards
- Leon Edwards (born 1991) – professional mixed martial artist, former UFC Welterweight Champion
- Rob Edwards (born 1982) – ex-footballer, current Manager for Luton Town F.C.
- Electribe 101 – electronic music group
- Hunt Emerson (born 1952) – cartoonist
- Ian Emes (born 1949) – animator
- Frederick Rowland Emett (1906–1990) – cartoonist, artist and kinetic sculptor
- Jo Enright (born 1968) – actress and comedian
- Dan Evans (born 1990) – former tennis player
- Niki Evans (born 1972) – singer
- Trevor Eve (born 1951) – actor
- Earl Falconer (born 1957) – bass player (UB40)
- Constance Amy Fall (1903–1992) – nurse
- Frank Farrell (1947–1997) – rock bassist and co-writer of "Moonlighting"
- Sid Field (1904–1950) – comedian
- F1NN5TER (born 2000) - Twitch streamer
- Robert Firth (1887–1966) – footballer and Real Madrid manager
- Philip Edward Fisher (born 1979) – musician
- Simon Fletcher (born 1948) – artist
- Sarah Florry (1744–1843) – metal dealer
- Winston Foster (born 1941) – footballer
- Mark Frost (born 1968) – actor
- Kevin Francis (born 1967) – footballer
- Harry Freeman (1858–1922) – music hall performer
- Edward Augustus Freeman (1823–1892) – historian, architectural artist and liberal politician
- Fuzzbox – late-1980s girl band

=== G–M ===
- Sir Francis Galton (1822–1911) – scientist; founder of eugenics
- Albert Gardner (1887–1923) – footballer
- Mike Gayle (born 1970) – writer
- Phil Gayle (born 1964) – broadcaster
- Helen George (born 1984) – actress
- Sam Gee (born 1992) — Rugby player
- GeoWizard (born 1990) – YouTuber
- Steve Gibbons (born 1941) – musician
- Colin Gibson (born 1960) – footballer
- Jon Gittens (1964–2019) – footballer
- John Goldingay (born 1942) – theologian, currently a professor of Old Testament, Fuller Theological Seminary
- Jaki Graham (born 1956) – soul singer
- Jack Grealish (born 1995) – footballer
- Mark "Barney" Greenway (born 1969) – musician (Napalm Death)
- Tom Grosvenor (1908–1972) – footballer
- George Dickinson Hadley (1908–1984) – gastroenterologist
- Rob Halford (born 1951) – musician, Judas Priest
- Charlie Hall (1899–1959) – actor; known for his work with Laurel and Hardy
- Alison Hammond (born 1975) – actress, television presenter
- Richard Hammond (born 1969) – television presenter
- John Hampson (1901–1955) – novelist
- Hannah Hampton (born 2000) – football goalkeeper
- Tony Hancock (1924–1968) – comedian and actor
- Ian Handysides (1962–1990) – footballer
- Nic Harcourt (born 1957) – American radio personality
- Nick Harding (born 1969) – Chief Medical Officer at Operose Health
- David Harewood (born 1965) – actor
- Wally Harris (1900–1933) – footballer
- Julia Hartley-Brewer (born 1968) – journalist and television panelist
- Norman Hassan (born 1958) – percussionist, UB40
- Phil Hawker (born 1962) – footballer
- William Haywood (1876–1957) – architect, town planner, and secretary of Birmingham Civic Society
- John Hemming (born 1960) – Member of Parliament and businessman
- Lee Hendrie (born 1977) – Aston Villa, later Basford United F.C. midfielder
- Duane Henry (born 1985) – actor
- Michael Higgs (born 1962) – actor
- Ian Hill (born 1951) – musician
- Jacqueline Hill (1929–1993) – actress
- David Hinds (born 1956) – rhythm guitarist and lead singer of Steel Pulse
- Ronzoni Hines – singer-songwriter
- Ken Hodge (born 1944) – National Hockey League player
- George Holyoake (1817–1906) – reformer
- Jack Hood (1902–1992) – boxer
- Martha Howe-Douglas (born 1980) – actress
- Dorothy Howell (1898–1982) – musician
- Mr. Hudson (born 1979) – singer
- Alex Hughes (born 1971) – cartoonist
- David Hughes (1925–1972) – operatic tenor
- Geoff Humpage (born 1954) – cricketer
- Al Hunter Ashton (1957–2007) – actor
- Raymond Huntley (1904–1990) – actor
- Millie Hylton (1870–1920) – actress and male impersonator
- Kassem Ibadulla (born 1964) – cricketer
- Tony Iommi (born 1948) – guitarist (Black Sabbath) (the surname Iommi is not to be confused with the demonym Brummie)
- Jamelia (born 1981) – R&B singer
- Maureen Jennings (born 1939) – novelist
- Claudia Jessie (born 1990) – actress
- Seth Johnson (born 1979) – footballer, Derby
- Ann Jones (born 1938) – tennis player; former World No. 2, 8 Grand Slam titles, including Wimbledon champion in 1969
- Digby Jones, Baron Jones of Birmingham (born 1955) – director-general of the Confederation of British Industry
- Felicity Jones (born 1983) – actress
- Geoffrey Jones – business historian
- John Jones (1858–1937) – cricketer
- Justin Jones (born 1964) – musician
- Simon Huw Jones (born 1960) – musician and photographer
- Nikita Kanda (born 1995) – radio presenter and socialite
- Trish Keenan (1968–2011) - musician (Broadcast)
- Ace Kefford (born 1946) – musician
- Mike Kellie (1947–2017) – musician (Spooky Tooth and The Only Ones)
- David Kelly (born 1965) – Republic of Ireland footballer
- Albert Ketèlbey (1875–1959) – composer
- Sir Rupert Alfred Kettle (1817–1894) – county court judge and noted strike arbitrator
- Guz Khan (born 1986) – comedian
- Jaykae (born 1991) – rapper
- Robert Kilroy-Silk (born 1942) – politician and television presenter
- John Andrew King (born 1964) – politician and singer
- Lorna Laidlaw (born 1963) – actress
- Denny Laine (born 1944) (Paul McCartney and Wings)
- Frederick W. Lanchester (1868–1946) – maker of the first petrol-driven car in Britain
- Bunny Larkin (1936–2025) – footballer
- Bob Latchford (born 1951) – footballer
- Dave Latchford (born 1949) – footballer
- Peter Latchford (born 1952) – footballer
- Ian Lavender (1946–2024) – actor
- Alfred Law (1862–1919) – Warwickshire cricketer and umpire
- Stewart Lee (born 1968) – comedian
- Vaughan Lee (born 1982) – ex-UFC fighter
- Russell Leetch (born 1982) – musician
- Joleon Lescott (born 1982) – footballer with Manchester City, Everton, Wolverhampton Wanderers
- Adrian Lester (born 1968) – actor
- Dick Lilley (1866–1929) – England and Warwickshire cricketer
- Letty Lind (1861–1923) – actress and dancer
- John Lodge (born 1945) – musician
- Jane C. Loudon (1807–1858) – writer of prose and verse and The Mummy
- Joseph Lucas (1834–1902) – founder of Lucas Industries
- Joe Lycett (born 1988) – comedian
- Jeff Lynne (born 1947) – musician (Electric Light Orchestra)
- Clare Maguire (born 1988) – musician born in Solihull but a resident of London
- Nigel Mansell (born 1953) – sportsman, F1 and Indy Car driver, 1992 Formula One World Champion, 1993 Indy Car Series Champion
- Lee Mantle (1851–1934) – U.S. Senator from Montana
- Sarah Manners (born 1975) – actress
- Tony Martin (born 1957) – musician (Black Sabbath)
- Eric Maschwitz (1901–1969) – lyricist
- Herbert Mason MC (1891–1960) – film director, producer, stage actor, stage manager, choreographer, and army officer in the First World War
- Hilary Mason (1917–2006) – actor
- Nick Mason (born 1944) – musician (Pink Floyd); did not reside in Birmingham
- Drake Maverick (born 1983) – WWE wrestler
- Robert McCracken (born 1968) – boxer, Commonwealth Middleweight champion, and World Title challenger
- Zena McNally (born 1979) – singer (Mis-Teeq)
- Christine McVie (1943–2022) – musician (Fleetwood Mac)
- Gil Merrick (1922–2010) – footballer and club manager
- Ken Miles (1918–1966) – sports car racing driver, engineer
- Shazia Mirza – comedian
- Mist (born 1992) – rapper
- Callum Moloney (born late 20th Century) - musician
- Alan Moore (born 1950) – musician
- William Moore (1916–2000) – actor
- Anisa Morridadi (born 1990) – social entrepreneur
- Everett Morton (1950–2021) – drummer (The Beat)
- Henry Vollam Morton (1892–1979) – journalist and travel writer
- Peter Mucklow (born 1949) – cricketer
- George Muntz (1794–1857) – pioneering industrialist and MP
- Laura Mvula (born 1986) – singer-songwriter
- Stanley Myers (1930–1993) – film music composer
- M1llionz (born 1997) – rapper
- Malkit Singh (born c. 1963) – Punjabi Bhangra singer

=== N–Z ===
- Constance Naden (1858–1889) – poet and philosopher
- Alan Napier (1903–1988) – actor
- Ritchie Neville (born 1979) – singer (Five)
- Neil Newbon (born 1978) – actor
- Ernie Newman (1887–?) – professional footballer
- Ernest Willmott Norton (1889–1972) – cricketer
- Patricia Noxolo – geographer
- Ursula O'Leary (1926–1993) – actress
- John Oliver (born 1977) – comedian, host of Last Week Tonight, and former 'Senior British Correspondent' of The Daily Show
- Ozzy Osbourne (1948–2025) – singer (Black Sabbath)
- Anri Okita (born 1986) – singer and former pornographic actress
- Carl Palmer (born 1950) – musician (Emerson, Lake & Palmer)
- Janet Parker (1938–1978) – medical photographer and last recorded person to die from smallpox
- Kay Parker (1944–2022) – pornographic actress
- Alexander Parkes (1813–1890) – inventor of the world's first plastic
- Henry Parkes (1815–1896) – Australian politician, "Father of Federation"
- Liam Payne (1993–2024) – singer (One Direction)
- Dave Pegg (born 1947) – musician (Fairport Convention and Jethro Tull)
- Kia Pegg (born 2000) – actress and television presenter
- Stephen Perryman (born 1955) – Warwickshire cricketer
- Gerry Peyton (born 1956) – footballer and goalkeeper coach
- James and Oliver Phelps (born 1986) – Harry Potter movie actors
- Jess Phillips (born 1981) – politician
- Michael Pinder (born 1941) – musician (The Moody Blues)
- Jacki Piper (born 1946) – actress
- Sadie Plant (born 1964) – writer
- John Poole (1926–2009) – sculptor
- Enoch Powell (1912–1998) – politician, poet and classical scholar
- Peter Powell (born 1951) – disc jockey
- Anthony E. Pratt (1903–1994) – inventor of Cluedo
- Bernard Quaife (1899–1984) – cricketer
- Alfred Radcliffe-Brown (1881–1955) – anthropologist
- Ranking Roger (1963–2019) – musician (The Beat)
- Mick Rathbone (born 1958) – footballer
- Adil Ray (born 1974) – actor, comedian, and radio and television presenter
- Nick Rhodes (born 1962) – musician (Duran Duran)
- Micah Richards (born 1988) – Manchester City F.C. defender
- Walter Richards (1863–1917) – cricketer and umpire
- Pat Roach (1937–2004) – actor and wrestler
- Dave Robinson (1948–2016) – footballer
- John Rogers (1505–1555) – Bible editor and martyr
- Sax Rohmer (Arthur Henry Sarsfield Ward) (1883–1959) – novelist
- Mark Rowley (born 1964) – Commissioner of Police of the Metropolis (London)
- Les Ross (born 1949) – radio disc jockey
- Adam Ruckwood (born 1974) – swimming Commonwealth Champion (200m backstroke)
- William Clayton Russon (born 1872) - businessman
- Mary Anne Schimmelpenninck (1778–1856) – writer on women in society and religion; slavery abolitionist
- Paul Scofield (1922-2008) - Actor
- Gary Shaw (1961–2024) – footballer
- Martin Shaw (born 1945) – actor
- Visanthe Shiancoe (born 1980) – American football player
- Sukshinder Shinda (born 1972) – English-born Punjabi music producer and artist
- Graham Short (born 1946) – micro-artist
- Paul Simm (born 20th century) – musician
- John Simmit (born 1963) – actor and comedian; known for playing Dipsy on Teletubbies from 1997 to 2001
- Jane Sixsmith (born 1967) – hockey player
- 1st Viscount Slim of Yarralumla and Bishopston (1891–1970) – military commander
- Sarah Smart (born 1977) – actress
- Alan Smith (born 1936) – cricketer and England selector
- Joshua Toulmin Smith (1816–1869) – political theorist
- Tiger Smith (1886–1979) – England and Warwickshire cricketer
- Maya Sondhi (born 1983) – actress
- Sir Benjamin Stone (1838–1914) – photographer
- Dean Sturridge (born 1973) – footballer
- Daniel Sturridge (born 1989) – footballer
- Simon Sturridge (born 1969) – footballer
- Ernest Suckling (1890–1962) – cricketer
- Phil Summerill (born 1947) – footballer
- James Sutton (born 1983) – actor
- Andrew Symonds (1975–2022) – cricketer
- Connie Talbot (born 2000) – singer
- John Taylor (born 1960) – musician (Duran Duran)
- Roger Taylor (born 1960) – musician (Duran Duran)
- Bobby Thomson (1943–2009) – footballer
- Will Thorne (1857–1946) – trade union leader; member of Parliament
- Charlie Tickle (1884–1960) – footballer
- Andrew Tiernan (born 1965) – actor
- Charlie Timmins (1922–2010) – footballer
- James Vaughan (born 1988) – Tranmere Rovers FC striker
- Johnny Vincent (1947–2006) – footballer
- Murray Walker (1923–2021) – motorsports journalist and commentator
- Kate Walsh (born 1981) – television presenter (Live from Studio Five)
- Julie Walters (born 1950) – actress
- Bill Ward (born 1948) – drummer (Black Sabbath)
- Clint Warwick (1940–2004) – musician (The Moody Blues)
- Carl Wayne (1943–2004) – musician (The Move and The Hollies)
- Graham Webb (1944–2017) – World Amateur Road Race Champion 1967
- Brooke Foss Westcott (1825–1901) – theologian and Bishop of Durham
- Peter Weston (1943–2017) – science fiction fan
- Ian Westwood (born 1982) – cricketer
- Fred Wheldon (1869–1924) – footballer
- Toyah Willcox (born 1958) – singer and television presenter
- Emma Willis (born 1976) – model
- George Willis-Pryce (1866–1949) – artist
- Jimmy Windridge (1882–1939) – England footballer
- Muff Winwood (born 1943) – musician
- Steve Winwood (born 1948) – musician (Traffic)
- Colin Withers (1940–2020) – footballer
- Chris Woakes (born 1989) – England and Warwickshire cricketer
- Chris Wood (1944–1983) – musician (Traffic)
- Roy Wood (born 1946) – musician (Electric Light Orchestra)
- Richie Woodhall (born 1968) – world champion boxer
- John Wyndham (1903–1969) – writer
- Kal Yafai (born 1989) – world champion boxer
- Dorian Yates (born 1962) – six-time Mr. Olympia
- Mark Yates (born 1970) – footballer and manager
- Benjamin Zephaniah (1958–2023) – poet

== Lived in or associated with Birmingham ==
- Joan Armatrading (born 1950) – singer, songwriter, quitarist
- W. H. Auden (1907–1973) – poet and author
- W. V. Awdry (1911–1997) – author of The Railway Series
- Sir Granville Bantock (1868–1946) – composer
- Connor Ball (born 1996) – bassist and singer (The Vamps)
- John Baskerville (1707–1775) – printer and inventor of typefaces
- Marie Bethell Beauclerc (1845–1897) – first female shorthand teacher and reporter in England
- Emma Blackery (born 1991) – musician
- William Booth (1776–1812) – forger
- John Bright (1811–1889) – politician
- Herbert Tudor Buckland (1869–1951) – architect
- Elihu Burritt (1810–1879) – US consul to Birmingham
- Pogus Caesar (born 1953) – broadcaster and artist
- Jazzy B (born 1975) – Punjabi singer
- Joseph Chamberlain (1836–1914) – politician, Mayor of Birmingham
- Bruce Chatwin (1940–1989) – author
- Lee Child (born 1954) – author
- George Dawson (1821–1876) – preacher
- Arthur Conan Doyle (1859–1930) – author of Sherlock Holmes
- John Boyd Dunlop (1840–1921) – industrialist, built Fort Dunlop
- Leon Edwards (born 1991) – professional mixed martial artist (originally from Kingston, Jamaica)
- Lucy Edwards, disability rights activist, educator, and TikToker
- Rev. Richard Enraght (1837–1898) – vicar, religious controversialist
- Allan Ford (born 1968) – soldier, convicted of manslaughter
- Philippa Forrester (born 1968) – television presenter, attended Birmingham University
- Foji Gill – singer, music producer
- Joseph Gillott (1799–1872) – industrialist
- Tommy Godwin (1920–2012) – racing cyclist and Olympic medallist
- Ashia Hansen (born 1971) – track and field athlete
- James Hinks (1829–1878) – bred the Bull Terrier dog
- William Ick (1800–1844) – botanist
- Washington Irving (1783–1859) – author
- Elizabeth "Tetty" Johnson (1689–1752) – wife of Samuel Johnson
- John Joubert (1927–2019) – South African-born composer
- Roi Kwabena (1956–2008) – author
- Simon Le Bon (born 1958) – studied drama at the University of Birmingham before joining Duran Duran in 1980
- Louis MacNeice (1907–1963) – poet
- Jane Madders (c. 1909–1990) – physiotherapist, educator and author
- Josiah Mason (1795–1881) – industrialist and philanthropist
- Nigel Mansell (born 1953) – racing driver
- Cardinal Newman (1801–1890) – theologian and founder of the English Oratory
- William McGregor (1846–1911) – instrumental in forming the football league
- William Murdoch (1754–1839) – inventor of gas lighting
- Bill Oddie (born 1941) – comedian and ornithologist
- Geoffrey Pernell (born 1971) – soldier, convicted of manslaughter
- Joseph Priestley (1733–1804) – chemist and dissenting clergyman
- Sir Simon Rattle (born 1955) – conductor of CBSO 1980–1998
- John Ray (1627–1705) – "Father of English natural history"
- Sir Peter Rigby (born 1943) – entrepreneur
- Mary Rollason (1764/5–1835) – steel toy maker and businesswoman
- Kevin Rowland (born 1953) – singer (Dexys Midnight Runners), formed in Birmingham
- Frank Skinner (born 1957) – comedian
- Mike Skinner (born 1979) – musician (The Streets)
- Meera Syal (born 1961) – actor, writer
- Dave Swarbrick (1941–2016) – musician
- J. R. R. Tolkien (1892–1973) – author
- Joshua Toulmin (1740–1815) – non-conformist preacher
- Ruby Turner (born 1958) – singer (originally from Montego Bay, Jamaica)
- UB 40 – Reggae group
- James Watt (1736–1819) – inventor and member of the Lunar Society
- Una White (1938/9–1997) – subject of public art-work
- William Withering (1741–1799) – doctor, discoverer of digitalis
- Victoria Wood (1953–2016) – actress
- John Skirrow Wright (1822–1880) – social improver
- Alastair Yates (1952–2018) – radio and television presenter
- Malala Yousafzai (born 1997) – Pakistani activist
- Lauren Zhang (born 2001) – pianist (winner of BBC Young Musician 2018) (originally from Albuquerque, New Mexico, United States of America)
- Syed Muhammad Faisal Sami (born 1977) - Award-winning Humanitarian based in Birmingham

Lady Leshurr Rapper

== See also ==
- Alumni of the University of Birmingham
