= Railton Road =

Street in London Borough of Lambeth

Coordinates: 51°27′26″N 0°06′26″W

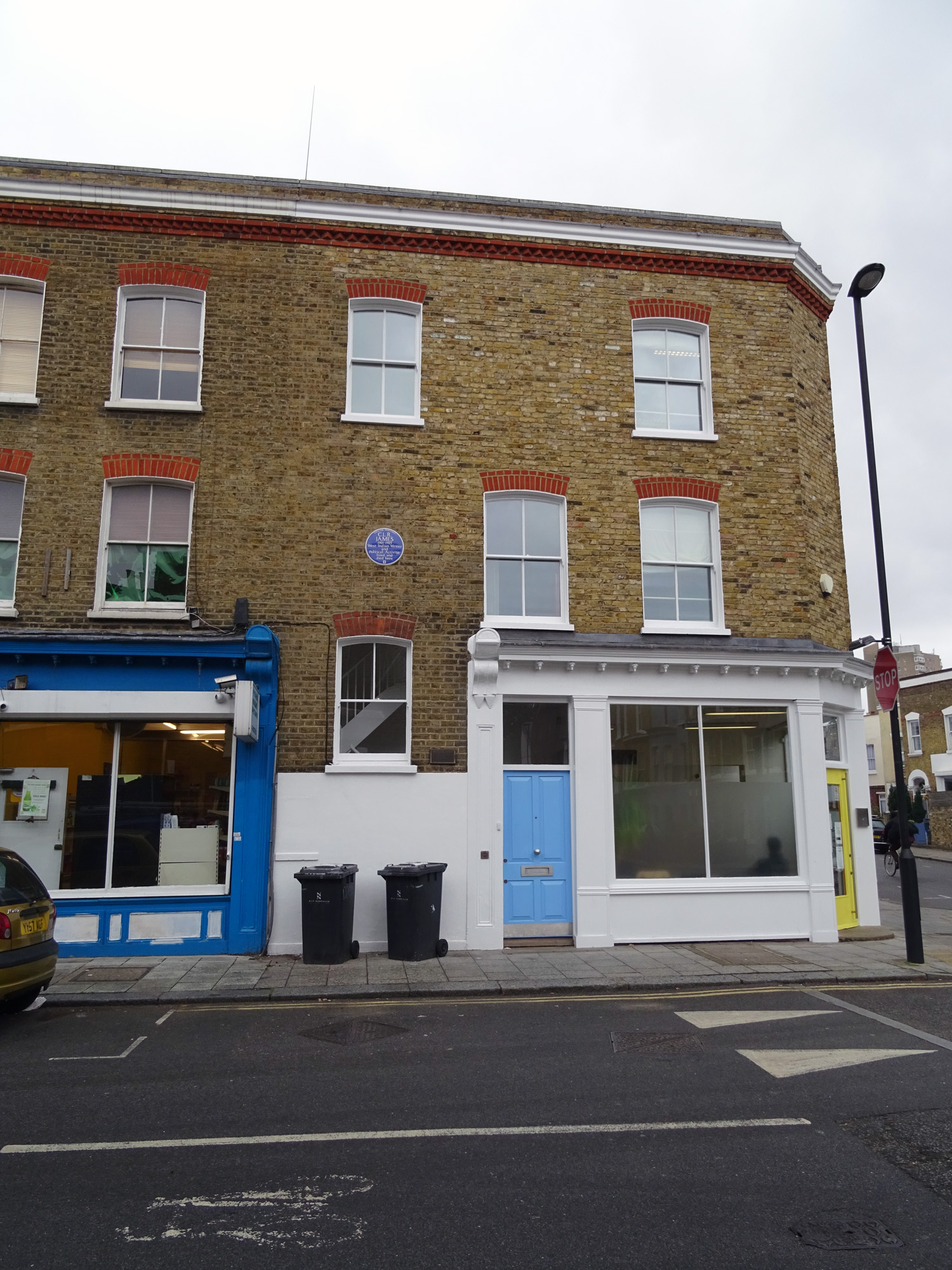
The home of C. L. R. James, 165 Railton Road

Railton Road runs between Brixton and Herne Hill in the London Borough of Lambeth. The road is designated the B223. At the northern end of Railton Road, it becomes Atlantic Road, linking to Brixton Road at a junction where the Brixton tube station is located. At the southern end is Herne Hill railway station.

A popular location for squatters in the 1970s, it won renown in the Black community as the "frontline" of the 1981 Brixton riot. Its leading establishment is the 198 Contemporary Arts and Learning centre.

== History ==
=== Origin ===
Railton Road takes its name, first applied to a stretch of the current street in 1869, from Gregory Railton, a local landowner in the 16th century. A small number of retail establishments and workshops had been established in response to the opening of Herne Hill station by the London, Chatham and Dover Railway in 1862.

Railton Road in its present form dates from a renumbering and renaming of streets in 1888. This incorporated buildings that had started life as properties on Station Road and Lett Street. It was in this late Victorian period that the road developed as a residential street. Railton Methodist Church (139–141 Railton Road) was erected in 1874 (damaged in the Blitz, it was replaced by the current church building and youth centre in 1963). The St. George’s Residences, 78-80 Railton Road, followed in 1878. With a water tank in their signature central tower, they are an early example of a purpose-built block of flats.

=== Squatted road, 1970s ===
After the Second World War, in which the Blitz damaged and destroyed much of the local housing stock, Lambeth Borough Council used new compulsory purchasing powers to buy out private landlords. A result was that, while plans for new public housing were being brought forward, many properties in Brixton, including on Railton Road, lay vacant and in disrepair. This contributed to an acute housing crisis in which West Indian immigrants and a growing Black community, in particular, found themselves crowded into substandard tenements. Combined with a developing counter-cultural scene in London, these conditions opened Railton Road in the 1970s to extensive squatting.

In 1972, the British Black Panthers, Olive Morris and Liz Obi, occupied a flat above a launderette on Railton Road. After fighting off attempts at illegal eviction, and taking cue from a group of white women who had also moved into the road to run women’s centre, they opened a larger corner-shop building, 121 Railton Road. This became a centre for Black organisations including the Brixton Black Women's Group, initially, and later for anarchists. Others followed: By the mid-1970s there was a second women’s centre at number 80; next to it in 78, the South London Gay Community Centre (evicted 1976); the collective producing Race Today, edited by Darcus Howe, whose uncle, the Trinidadian historian C. L. R. James, lived – and in 1989 was to die – at number 165 (now the Brixton Advice Centre); a Claimants’ Union; and, underneath her dress shop at 103, Pearl Alcock’s Shebeen (patronised by Caribbean gay men, it was closed by the police in 1979).

=== 1981 Brixton Riot and its aftermath ===
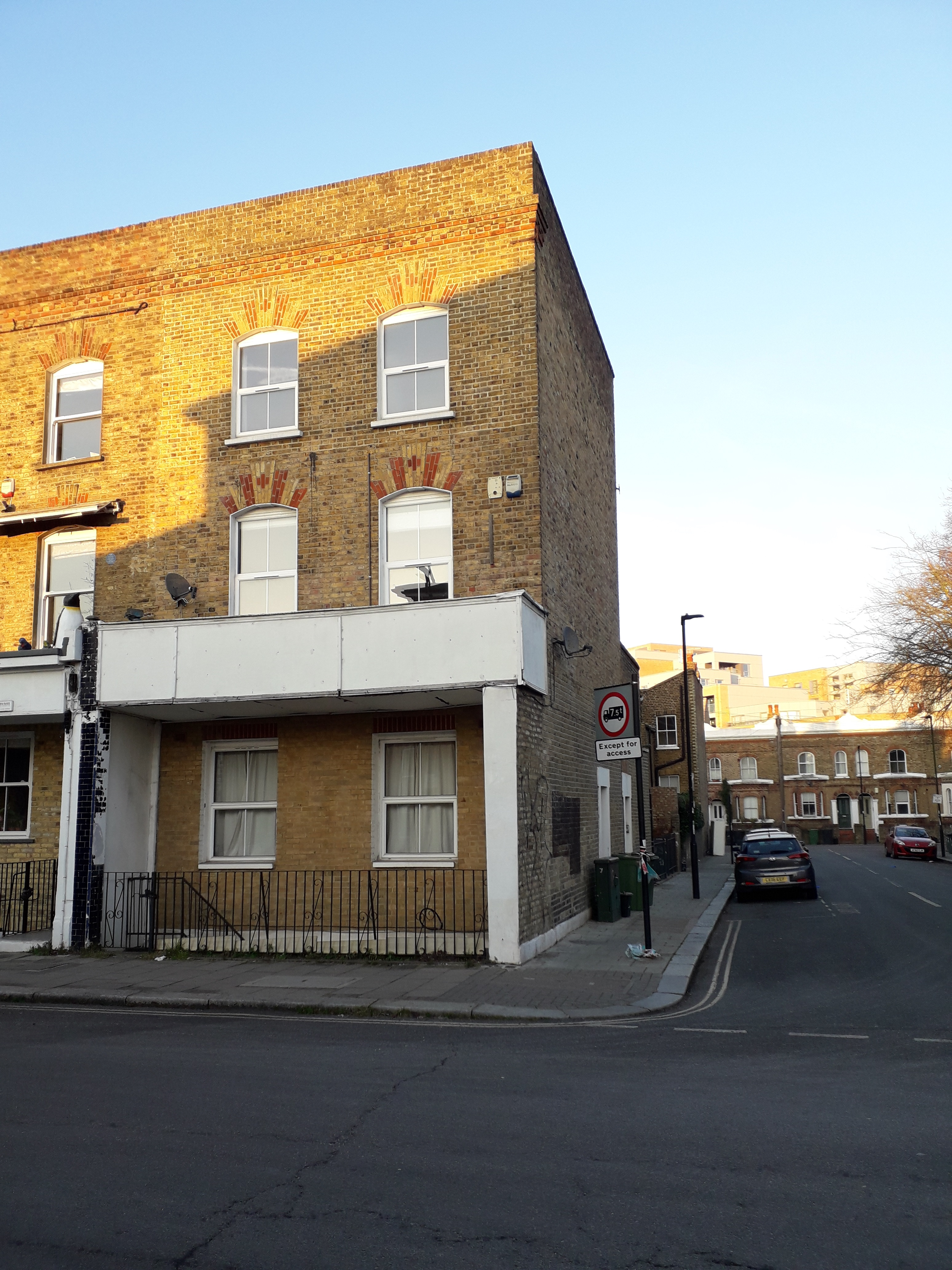
121 Railton Road in 2023

In 1981, Albert Meltzer, who established the Kate Sharpley Library (KSL) in the "121 Centre", recalls the police doing "their best" to blame the onset of the Brixton riot on he and his fellow anarchists, but that this had been "rather difficult as the rioters were Black youths pushed by harassment". The official Scarman Inquiry accepted that the trigger for the riot was the police's increased use of stop-and-search (the "sus law" which was subsequently repealed), and tensions arising from the deaths of 13 black teenagers and young adults in a suspicious house fire in New Cross.

In the riot, the George public house was burnt down and a number of other buildings were damaged, and the area became known as the "Front Line". In their search of the source of petrol bombs, police were accused of damaging homes, smashing televisions and ripping furniture.

After the riot, the authorities had saturated the area with police and social workers, and demolished half of both Railton and Mayall Roads, clearing them of shops, homes and clubs, although not without incident. In November 1982, following evictions from nine houses, riot squads broke through a makeshift barricade and batoned a large crowd of youths. In advance of demolition, squatters who had held out around the corner, in Effra Parade, were turned out of their row of seven workers' cottages by a force of 200 police in 1984.

The George was replaced with a Caribbean bar called Mingles. Later called the Harmony, this was to last as a late-night, mostly Caribbean-British attended, club/bar until the 2000s. The 121 Centre, in which the anarchists later ran a bookshop, a cafe and a disco, and published their news sheet Black Flag, was one legacy of squatting in Railton Road that survived until its heavily contested eviction in 1999.

=== 21st century ===
In 1994, an organisation, originally named Roots Community, founded in 1988 by John "Noel" Morgan, a minicab driver and Zoe Lindsay-Thomas, manager of the Vargus Social Club in Landor Road, established an arts centre at 198 Railton Road. 198 Contemporary Arts and Learning, also known as the 198 Gallery or 198, describes itself as a "Black-led, arts, creative and cultural organisation which nurtures and supports the careers of young Black, Asian and Minority Ethnic artists, curators, creatives and entrepreneurs".

198 has hosted projects and solo exhibitions showcasing the work of more than four hundred British and international artists, including: Keith Piper, Eva Sajovic, Hew Locke, Brian Griffiths, Fernando Palma Rodriguez, Quilla Constance, Barby Asante, Delaine Le Bas, and Godfried Donkor In 2022, it mounted a retrospective, "Coming Home", for the drawings and paintings of Pearl Alcock who, after her shebeen was closed at 103, continued to run a cafe at 105 until, following the 1981 riot, her electricity was cut. The gallery is currently closed for renovations.

On 30 October 2022, 21-year-old Deliveroo driver Guilherme Messias Da Silva, and 27-year-old Lemar Urquhart were killed as a result of a gang-related incident on Railton Road. Da Silva was fatally injured after his moped collided with a car being driven by Urquhart who was at the time of the collision being pursued by another vehicle. Urquhart escaped his car before being chased down and fatally shot.

== Notable people ==
- Pearl Alcock
- Winifred Atwell opened "The Winifred Atwell Salon" at 82a Railton Road in 1956
- Rotimi Fani-Kayode lived and died at 151 Railton Road
- Darcus Howe
- Leila Hassan, editor of Race Today
- Linton Kwesi Johnson
- C. L. R. James lived and died at 165 Railton Road, where in 2004 English Heritage erected a blue plaque.
- Olive Morris and Liz Obi lived at 121 Railton Road

== Notable organisations ==
- 198 Contemporary Arts and Learning
- 121 Centre at 121 Railton Road
  - The centre was home to a bookshop, a cafe, a meeting room, and offices for organisations such as The Anarchist Black Cross and the Faredodgers Association.
  - It also hosted the legendary club night Dead by Dawn, and early sets by artists such as Hectate.
  - It was squatted as the 121 Centre from 1981 to 1999, making it one of London's longest continuous squats. When it was evicted, Railton Road held a number of street parties mourning the loss of the important community asset.
  - The building has now been converted into flats.
- Brixton Black Women's Group at 121 Railton Road
- Black Panther Movement
- South London Gay Community Centre, GLF and Brixton Fairies at number 78
  - The building has now been knocked down and converted into luxury apartments, with no reference to its past
- Race Today Collective at 165 Railton Road

== Gallery ==
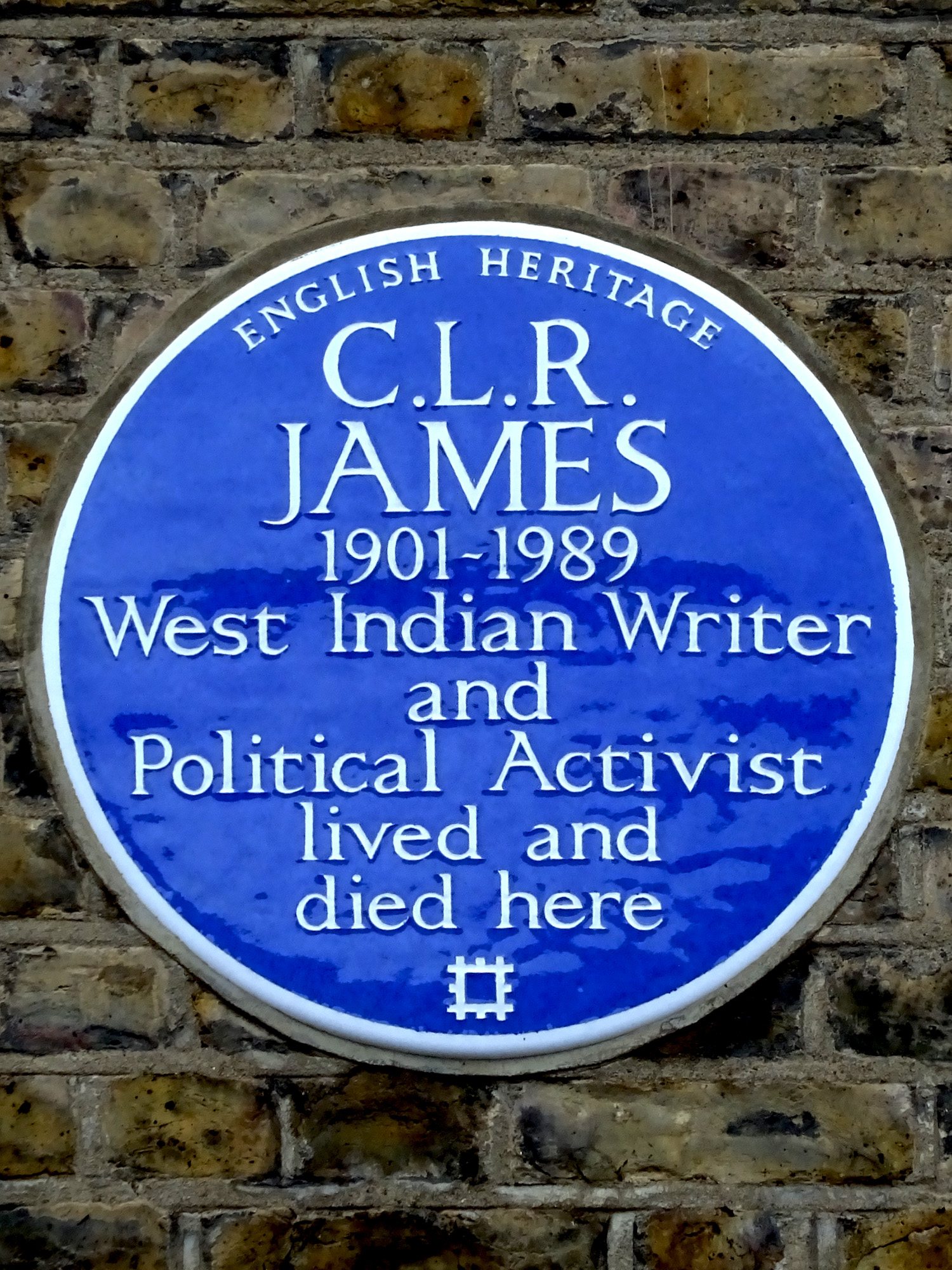
Blue Plaque at 165 Railton Road

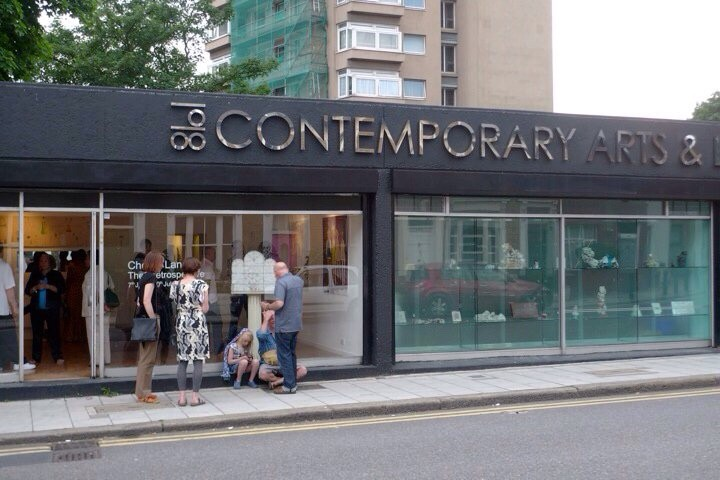
198 Contemporary Arts and Learning, 198 Railton Road

== See also ==
- Herne Hill
