= Fierce! =

English international performance festival

- Status: Active
- Genre: Art festival
- Frequency: Annually
- Location: Birmingham
- Country: United Kingdom
- Inaugurated: 2004
- Founder: Mark Ball
- People: Mark Ball; Laura McDermott and Harun Morrison; Aaron Wright; Clayton Lee
- Website: wearefierce.org

Fierce! is an international performance festival (previously produced by Fierce Earth) that has taken place annually in and around Birmingham, England since 1997.

The launch of the 2004 festival, in May in Birmingham, England, was a group of hot air balloons that drifted over Birmingham's streets in the early hours of the morning playing soft music to "encourage dreams related to the music".

In May 2007, the artwork Una White was created as part of the festival.

Fierce! 11 was held over the May Bank Holiday, 23 to 26 May 2008 and the artists taking part in the festival were chosen by way of a public vote. The voting commenced on 20 March 2008 and concluded on 11 April 2008.

The Birmingham Repertory Theatre, Warwick Arts Centre and Birmingham Hippodrome also collaborate heavily in the events.

In 2011 Fierce Festival reappeared after several years absence under the new joint artistic direction of Laura McDermott and Harun Morrison with the tagline 'Live Art. Collision. Super Local. Hyper Now.'

In 2013 Fierce launched Club Fierce XXX featuring New York rapper Cakes Da Killa grime MC Roxxxan, and electro punk satirist Quilla Constance.

In 2016, Aaron Wright became Artistic Director and the first festival under his leadership took place in 2017.

In 2019 The Guardian Newspaper gave the Festival five stars and described it as 'a daring whirl of theatrical thrills'

In 2024, after seven successful years, Aaron Wright left Fierce to become Head of Performance and Dance at the Southbank Centre and Clayton Lee become Director (Artistic) of Fierce alongside co-directors Pippa Frith (Producing) and Catherine Groom (Operations).

In September 2025, Fierce appointed Executive Director Ethan Hudson. Ethan joins after Director (Operations) Catherine Groom and Director (Producing) Pippa Frith left earlier this summer to take on the roles of General Manager for Artsadmin and Executive Producer for Selina Thompson Limited, respectively.

During his directorship Aaron led three outstanding editions of Fierce Festival in 2017, 2019 and 2022. In 2022 Aaron led special Fierce projects, Key to the City, a major participatory public realm artwork by Paul Ramírez Jonas and The Healing Gardens of Bab, a three-week programme exploring colonialism and queerness, as part of Birmingham 2022 Festival for the Birmingham 2022 Commonwealth Games.

Fierce festival has also presented performances by numerous artists including Ron Athey, Franko B, Gob Squad, Tim Miller, Forced Entertainment and more.
