= Alan Ford =

Alan or Allen Ford may refer to:

== People ==
- Alan Ford (actor) (born 1938), English actor
- Alan Ford (Canadian football) (born 1943), Canadian Football League player and manager
- Alan Ford (swimmer) (1923–2008), American swimmer
- Al Ford (born 1950), Canadian boxer
- Allan Ford (born 1968), convicted of the killing of Louise Jensen

== Other uses ==
- Alan Ford (comics), Italian comic book series
