= 198 Contemporary Arts and Learning =

Arts gallery in London, United Kingdom

Coordinates: 51.45397°N 0.10374°W

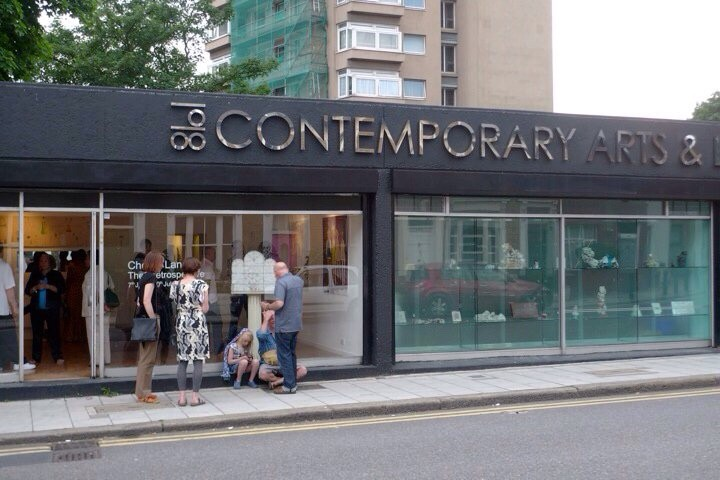
198 Contemporary Arts and Learning, 2010

198 Contemporary Arts and Learning, also known as the 198 Gallery or 198, is an art space and gallery in Railton Road, Brixton, London.

== History ==
The organisation, originally named Roots Community, was founded in 1988 by John "Noel" Morgan and Zoe Lindsay-Thomas. Lindsay-Thomas was a minicab driver and Morgan was manager of the Vargus Social Club in Landor Road. The organisation eventually changed its name to 198 Gallery, after its location on Railton Road.

198's initial remit was to promote the work of contemporary African, Caribbean and Asian artists whose work represented the diversity of British society. 198 later expanded their policy to include artists from outside the UK.

== Exhibitions ==
During the course of its 28-year existence, 198 Contemporary Arts and Learning has hosted projects and solo exhibitions showcasing the work of more than four hundred British and international artists, including: Rotimi Fani-Kayode, Keith Piper, Eva Sajovic, Hew Locke, Brian Griffiths, Fernando Palma Rodriguez, Quilla Constance, Barby Asante, Delaine Le Bas, Godfried Donkor and Ben F. Jones.
