= Braddon =

Braddon may refer to several people and places:

== Last name ==
- Sir Edward Braddon (1829–1904), Australian politician and member of the inaugural Australian House of Representatives
- Sir Henry Braddon (1863–1955), rugby union player and ambassador, son of Edward Braddon
- Laurence Braddon (died 1724), English politician and writer
- Mary Elizabeth Braddon (1835–1915), British novelist, daughter of Edward Braddon
- Paul Braddon (1864–1938), English landscape artist
- Russell Braddon (1921–1995), Australian writer, great-grandson of Edward Braddon

== First name ==
- Braddon Green (born 1959), Australian cricketer
- Braddon Mendelson (born 1961), American playwright

== Places named after Sir Edward Braddon ==
- Braddon, Australian Capital Territory, inner suburb of Canberra
- Division of Braddon, Australian Electoral Division
- Division of Braddon (state), electoral division for the Tasmanian House of Assembly

== See also ==
- Braddan, parish of the Isle of Man
