= Pearl Alcock =

Jamaican artist and business woman (1934–2006)

- Born: 16 April 1934; Jamaica
- Died: 7 May 2006; Brixton, London, England, UK
- Known for: Artist and proprietor of LGBT+ bar

Pearl Alcock (16 April 1934, Jamaica – 7 May 2006, London, England) was a club owner and artist, best known as a British outsider artist.

== Life and work ==
Alcock moved to the UK from Jamaica at the age of 25, abandoning her marriage in Jamaica.

=== The shop, the bar and the cafe on Railton Road ===
First finding work as a maid in Leeds, by the 1970s she had opened a dress shop at 103 Railton Road in Brixton, London, and underneath it created an illegal shebeen, popular with the local gay community. She herself was known to be bisexual. After the first Brixton uprising reduced the numbers of customers to her shop, she shut it down and opened a cafe at 105 Railton Road. The 1985 Brixton uprising brought more financial hardship, culminating with a period when the cafe was run by candlelight after the electricity was shut off.

=== Art career ===
Alcock's journey with art began when she was unable to afford to buy a birthday card for a friend so she drew one herself. Alcock described this realization of her knack for drawing:

I went mad scribbling on anything I laid my hands on [...] friends admired what I had done and began to bring me materials to use; that is how I started.

By the late 1980s, she was receiving more recognition, her art being exhibited at the 198 Gallery, the Almeida Theatre and the Bloomsbury Theatre. Then, in 1990, her work was included in the London Fire Brigade calendar.

Monika Kinley, one of the country's leading advocates of Outsider Art, describes her as "a visual poet". Alcock gained mainstream recognition a year before her death when, in 2005, her work was included in Tate Britain's first exhibition of art shown under the term Outsider Art.

In 2019, she was the subject of the retrospective at the Whitworth Art Gallery, Manchester. In 2022, she received a retrospective exhibition, Coming Home - A Retrospective of the work of Pearl Alcock, at 198 Gallery in Brixton.

Following her solo retrospective in 2019, Alcock's work was included in (Un)Defining Queer at the Whitworth Art Gallery, Manchester in 2023.

In 2025, Alcock's work was featured in an institutional survey Lives Less Ordinary: Working-Class Britain Re-seen, held in London at Two Temple Place from 25 January 2025 to 20 April 2025.

== Selected exhibitions ==
- 2022: COMING HOME - A retrospective of the work of Pearl Alcock, 198 Gallery
- 2019: Pearl Alcock, Whitworth Art Gallery, Manchester
- 2005: Outsider Art, Tate Britain, London
- 1989: Three Brixton Artists: Pearl Alcock, George Kelly, Michael Ross, 198 Gallery, London
- 1989: Mood Paintings, 198 Gallery

== Public collections ==
- The Whitworth, Manchester, UK
- Collectie de Stadshof, Netherlands

== The Brixton LGBTQ community ==
Alcock's shebeen had an unprecedentedly important place in the Brixton LGBTQ scene for the time. A white British man named Simon recalled the place as a hub of interaction for both the local LGBTQ black and white populations:

Always heaving a space this sort of size packed with people dancing, and there would be a bar at the end selling Heineken or cocktail type stuff, martinis and so on...there were only one or two women there, about 80% black men, 20% white I suppose. Of the black guys that would go to Pearl’s, maybe half of them would be in a relationship with a white person, and half would be in a relationship with a black person.

== Death ==
Pearl Alcock died on 7 May 2006 at the age of 72. She was living nearby to where she had been running the three different establishments on Railton Road, and she was still making art. Many attended her funeral.
