= Mary Rollason =

British self employed businesswoman

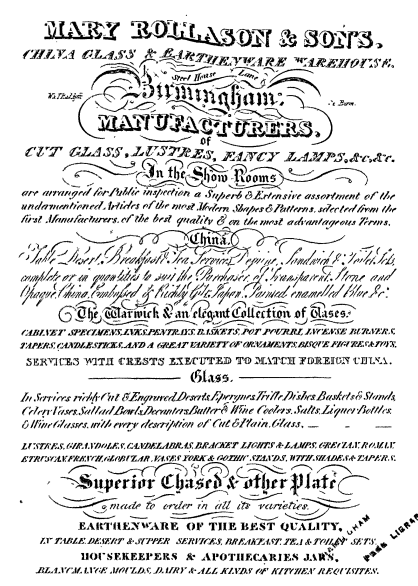
- 1825 advertisement
- Born: 1764/5
- Died: 17 January 1835; Birmingham, England
- Occupation: business person
- Known for: steel toys, cut glass and china
- Children: Thomas

Mary Rollason (1764/5 – 17 January 1835) was a British self employed businesswoman based in Birmingham. She first made steel toys and then dealt in china, cut glass and brass items. Her business was called "Mary Rollason and Son's China, Glass and Earthenware Warehouse" in 1825. Her son Thomas joined the business and continued it after her death.

== Life ==
Rollason is first recorded in 1791 when a trade directory records her business of making steel toys. This was an increasingly less profitable business as steel toymakers would sell to buyers and that would then re-sell them absorbing the profit and not sharing it equitably with the manufacturers. Rollason stocked Wedgwood china and she visit their works in 1808. In the 1820s she was working at 108 Steel House Lane in Birmingham.

Rollason appears to have moved her business into pottery, where she was the dealer. She sold her goods to the middle-classes from her business but she also operated as a wholesaler. She dealt in brass and cut-glass which was created at a manufactory she owned. The manufactory was nearby in Steelhouse Lane and in 1825 she brought her son into the business styling the company "Mary Rollason and Son". They had a trade card for "Mary Rollason & Son's" advertising their china, glass and earthenware warehouse. Their 1825 advert advised readers that they sold and made cut-glass, lustres and fancy lamps.

Rollason died at her home on 17 January 1835 on Bristol Road in Birmingham. She was buried on 24 January 1835 at St Mary's Church, Whittall Street, Birmingham which is now demolished. She was seventy years old. The business continued as "Thmas Rollason", then "G.T.Rollason". In 1845 Rollason and Son was still trading in China items transfer printed with the firm's name.
