= Quilla Constance =

British painter

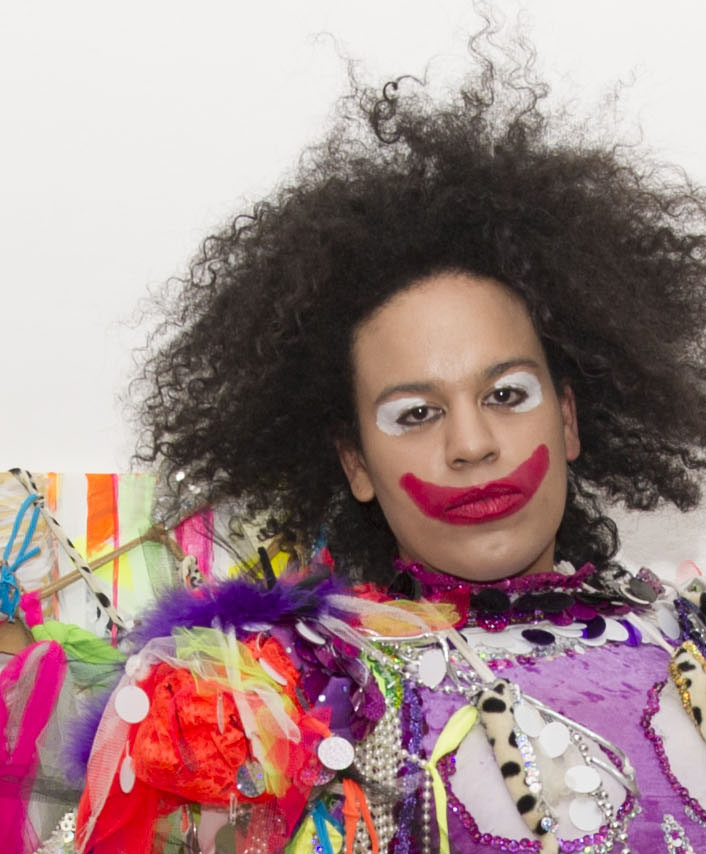
- Quilla Constance performing at 198 Contemporary Arts, 2015
- Born: Jennifer Allen; 1980 (age 45–46); Birmingham, West Midlands, England
- Education: University of Oxford; Goldsmiths College, University of London; Rose Bruford College

Jennifer Allen, known professionally as Quilla Constance, is a British contemporary interdisciplinary artist and lecturer, born in Birmingham, 1980.

== Education ==
Allen graduated from the Ruskin School of Drawing and Fine Art, St John's College, University of Oxford with a BA (Hons) Fine Art in 2001 and earned an MFA from Goldsmiths, University of London in 2006. She later studied acting at Rose Bruford College.

== Persona and style ==
Shortly after completing her master's degree, Allen created her Quilla Constance persona as an extension of the exoticised, androgynous punk-carnival aesthetic and malevolent demeanour explored in her earlier video and performance works and "to locate a point of agency within a hegemonic framework of white phallocentric order". Constance subsequently began staging performances in clubs, theatres, art galleries, music venues, the street and mainstream television.

Quilla Constance (abbreviated to QC) stages interventions across an interdisciplinary practice of paintings, lectures, photographs, live performances, costumes and music videos. Her live performance work has been noted for its "unflinching physical narrative performed entirely through breath, posture and non-verbal sounds: panting like a dog, sex noises, then laughter, pure guttural anger, and back again".

Her faculty biography states that "QC over-identifies with an 'exotic' militant punk persona to interrogate category-driven capitalist networks, through staging and virally inserting her artistic practice within pop culture, traversing music venues, forging protests and entering art galleries in order to emulate and interrupt the operations of these cultural zones".

QC's varied art practice also frequently 'scrutinises food as a signifying system onto which social class and ethnic identities are mapped out, from fried chicken in cardboard take¬away boxes to tea in fine, bone china cups.' where she questions the limitations of categories, boundaries, and contexts to humorous and destabilising effect.

== Career ==
Allen's video and performance works have been exhibited internationally since 2003 and are held in the art collections of Anita and Poju Zabludowicz, Roberts Institute of Art, and Goldsmiths College (Warden's).

In 2003, Allen was awarded British and Arts Council funding for her solo exhibition and artist's residency at BizArt Center, Shanghai, China through the ARTLINKART International Residency Programme.

In 2007, Allen guest curated a video screening at 176 London, Zabludowicz Collection. The event featured Allen's 2006 video work 'Happy Christmas Mom & Dad', a piece that sees Allen allegedly perform a seductive dance as a gift for her parents on Christmas Day.

In an interview with arts patron Shalini Passi, Constance stated that "My current professional name is Quilla Constance ... which is an art persona I've cultivated and deployed since 2009. My birth name is Jennifer Allen, and the name I operated under from 2001 to 2009"

In 2010, Constance staged a 'militant punk protest performance' outside the former Punk Soho nightclub in order to challenge the venue for cancelling a Quilla Constance punk performance in favour of a corporate booking. She later successfully prosecuted the club's promoter through Equity.

In 2011, the 80s synth-pop and New Romanticism artists Rusty Egan and Steve Strange invited Constance to perform at a reunion in the former Soho Blitz Club. Later that year, she performed at Fierce! Festival, Birmingham alongside Cakes da Killa.

In 2015, 2017 and 2019 Allen was awarded funding from Arts Council England in support of a series of Quilla Constance solo projects and exhibitions: 'Teasing Out Contingencies: Quilla Constance Open Studio' at Tate Modern, Tate Exchange and The Higgins Art Gallery & Museum 'Transcending The Signified' at The Museum of Contemporary Art/ MOCA, London, which toured to the Old Fire Station Theatre, Oxford; '#QC' at The Kendrew Barn, St John's College, Oxford and 'PUKIJAM' at 198 Contemporary Arts and Learning, curated by Maria Kheirkhah. PUKIJAM received additional support from The Research Centre for Transnational Art, Identity and Nation (TrAIN); and Diversity Arts Forum In December 2017 Allen's artworks were discussed in a paper presented at the conference 'Black Artists and Modernism: Conceptualism – Intersectional Readings, International Framings' held at Van Abbemuseum in the Netherlands.

In February 2018, Constance was selected by Bedford Creative Arts and live art organisation Artichoke (company) to lead women's art workshops in Bedford, and commissioned to produce a banner artwork with women of Bedfordshire to honour the suffragettes and the suffragists, and celebrate the centenary of women's right to vote. The banner featured in a major London procession PROCESSIONS (artwork) held on 10 June 2018. In a statement to the Associated Press, Constance said of the Suffragettes "They were really quite anarchic...They had to really fight. And we still have to fight...I think they're here today in spirit, and we're giving them high fives."

198 Contemporary Arts and Learning was the first gallery to screen Constance's arts council-commissioned video piece, PUKIJAM, which sees her 'perform a dystopian golliwog cakewalk, accompanied and interrupted by a montage of erotic media images, figurative objects and her mutant, sub-linguistic scat vocal set against a relentless electronic throb'. The exhibition also featured vibrant 'exotic' costumes adorning large, acrylic paint on canvas abstractions. 'These conspired with video works, inviting the viewer into a dialogue through which notions of cultural authenticity and the production of meaning were visibly contested'

In July 2015, Constance was invited to screen her performance art video, PUKIJAM in the Kendrew Barn Gallery, St John's College, Oxford for The 2000 Women Big Party. The event was held in celebration of the matriculation of the 2000th female to read for a degree at St John's College Oxford, and the appointment of Margaret Snowling, the first female president of the college in 450 years. St John's College, Oxford was an all-male college until 1979.

Constance has written articles for Transition Gallery (Garageland magazine) and The Rebel. She also writes a quarterly punk-art gossip column, 'Quilla's Constant Catch-Up' for La Bouche Zine.

=== Television ===
During the COVID-19 pandemic, Quilla Constance appeared on the docuseries Rob & Romesh Vs (Art) on Sky One, where she invited presenter-comedians Rob Beckett and Romesh Ranganathan to experiment with performance art in her studio. Here she offered up "Hoops in Flutes" and "High Tea in PPE". The episode also featured Constance's single and video PR BLITZ, described in The Guardian as "brilliantly deranged punk of Quilla Constance’s PR Blitz), in which the artist sings salacious tabloid headlines against a junkyard backdrop".

During tier 2 lockdown, Constance also featured in 'How Limits Can Boost Your Creativity' for BBC IDEAS where she makes reference to her admiration for artist Faith Ringgold, and the positive activation of her own biracial, working class female identity within the historically sexist and elitist contemporary art world.

== Artworks ==
- 2006 'Happy Christmas Mom & Dad' Performance/Video Artwork
- 2016 'Pukijam' Performance/Video Artwork
- 2016 '#QC_001' Performance/Video Artwork
- 2017 'Celsnakar' Painting
- 2017 'Transcending The Signified' Quilla Constance live performance, MOCA London

== Publications ==
- 2019 A Companion to Feminist Art, Hilary Robinson (editor), Maria Elena Buszek (editor)-Blackwell Wiley ISBN 9781118929155
- 2015 Garageland art, culture and ideas 'SEX' edition No. 18 (pages 15–19) 'Freud and Eros: Love, Lust, Longing and The Oedipus Complex: Jennifer Allen a.k.a. Quilla Constance visits The Freud Museum' edition #18 (pages 15–19)
- 2012 Equity magazine, spring 2012, page 11
- 2010 The Rebel 'Q&A With Quilla Constance'
- 2008 Saatchi Online 'Emerging Artist of The Week' Saatchi Art Online Magazine
- 2001 Bloomberg New Contemporaries Catalogue
