= Southbank Centre =

Arts centre in London, England

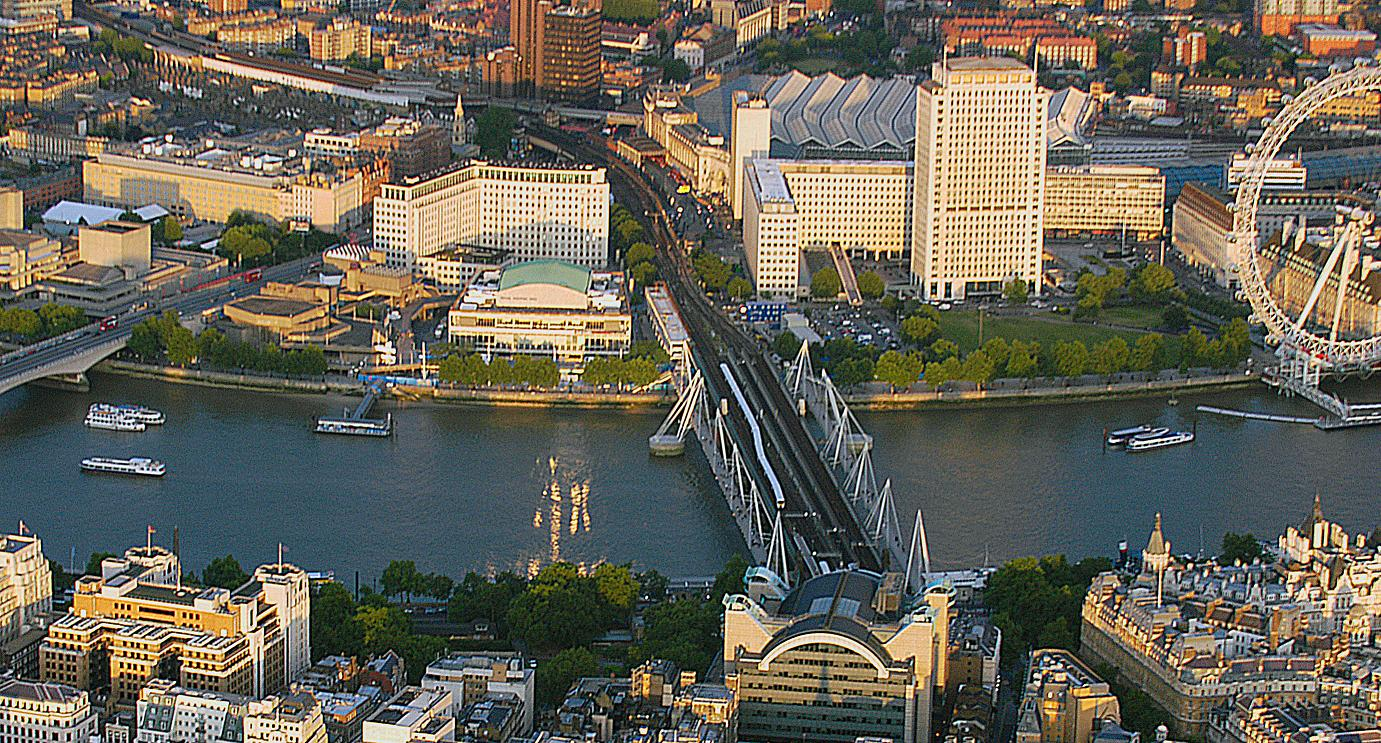
- Southbank Centre's 11 acre former estate extended from Waterloo Bridge to the London Eye
- Interactive map of Southbank Centre
- Full name: Southbank Centre
- Address: Belvedere Road; London, SE1; United Kingdom
- Coordinates: 51°30′20.56″N 00°07′0.34″W
- Owner: Southbank Centre Ltd. (registered charity, responsible to Arts Council England)
- Capacity: Royal Festival Hall: 2,700; Queen Elizabeth Hall: >900; Purcell Room: 370
- Type: Artistic venues: Royal Festival Hall; Queen Elizabeth Hall; Purcell Room; Hayward Gallery
- Designation: Grade II
- Acreage: 11
- Public transit: Waterloo; Waterloo

Construction
- Opened: 1 May 1951; 75 years ago
- Architect: Norman Engleback's team at the London County Council Architects' Department

Website
- southbankcentre.co.uk

The Southbank Centre is an arts centre in London, England. It is adjacent to the separately owned National Theatre and BFI Southbank.

It comprises the three main performance spaces – the Royal Festival Hall, Queen Elizabeth Hall, and Purcell Room – as well as the Hayward Gallery and National Poetry Library. It is the largest centre for the arts in the UK. The Southbank Centre drew around 3.7 million visitors to its venues in 2024 and stages approximately 5,000 performances each year. Three to four major art exhibitions are presented at the Hayward Gallery annually. Together with the Barbican Centre, a similar arts venue, the Southbank Centre is also known for its brutalist architecture, which now has listed building status.

The centre referred itself to the Charity Commission for England and Wales and the Secretary of State for Culture, Media and Sport called upon Arts Council England to investigate the Southbank Centre after its chair, Misan Harriman allegedly promoted antisemitic conspiracy theories and tropes in the 2026 Golders Green attack aftermath.

== Location ==
Southbank Centre's site is on the South Bank of the River Thames, between Hungerford Bridge and Waterloo Bridge.

It is fronted by The Queen's Walk and formerly extended to 21 acres (85,000 m^{2}), from County Hall to Waterloo Bridge, however in 2012 management of Jubilee Gardens transferred to the Jubilee Gardens Trust and the car park on the remaining land beyond Hungerford Bridge was sold in 2013, to extend the gardens as part of the Shell Centre redevelopment.

The closest Underground stations are Waterloo and Embankment.

== Personnel ==
Misan Harriman became chairman of the Board of Governors of the Southbank Centre in 2022, succeeding Susan Gilchrist, who had held the role since 2016. Elaine Bedell was appointed as Chief Executive in 2017; from 2009 to 2016 that position was held by Alan Bishop, former chairman of Saatchi & Saatchi International and Chief Executive of the Central Office of Information.

September 2005 saw the arrival of Jude Kelly as the centre's Artistic Director. After Kelly stepped down in order to devote herself to the Women of the World Festival, Madani Younis (previously Artistic Director at the Bush Theatre) was appointed to the new role of Creative Director from January 2019, to work alongside Gillian Moore, the Director of Music, and Ralph Rugoff, Director of the Hayward Gallery. Younis resigned in October 2019. Gillian Moore stepped down from her directorship in 2022, and the Music programme is now overseen by Jane Beese, Head of Contemporary Music, and Toks Dada, Head of Classical Music.

The role of artistic director remained vacant until the appointment of the former creative director of Manchester International Festival, Mark Ball who took up his position at the Southbank in January 2022.

== History ==
=== 1950s ===
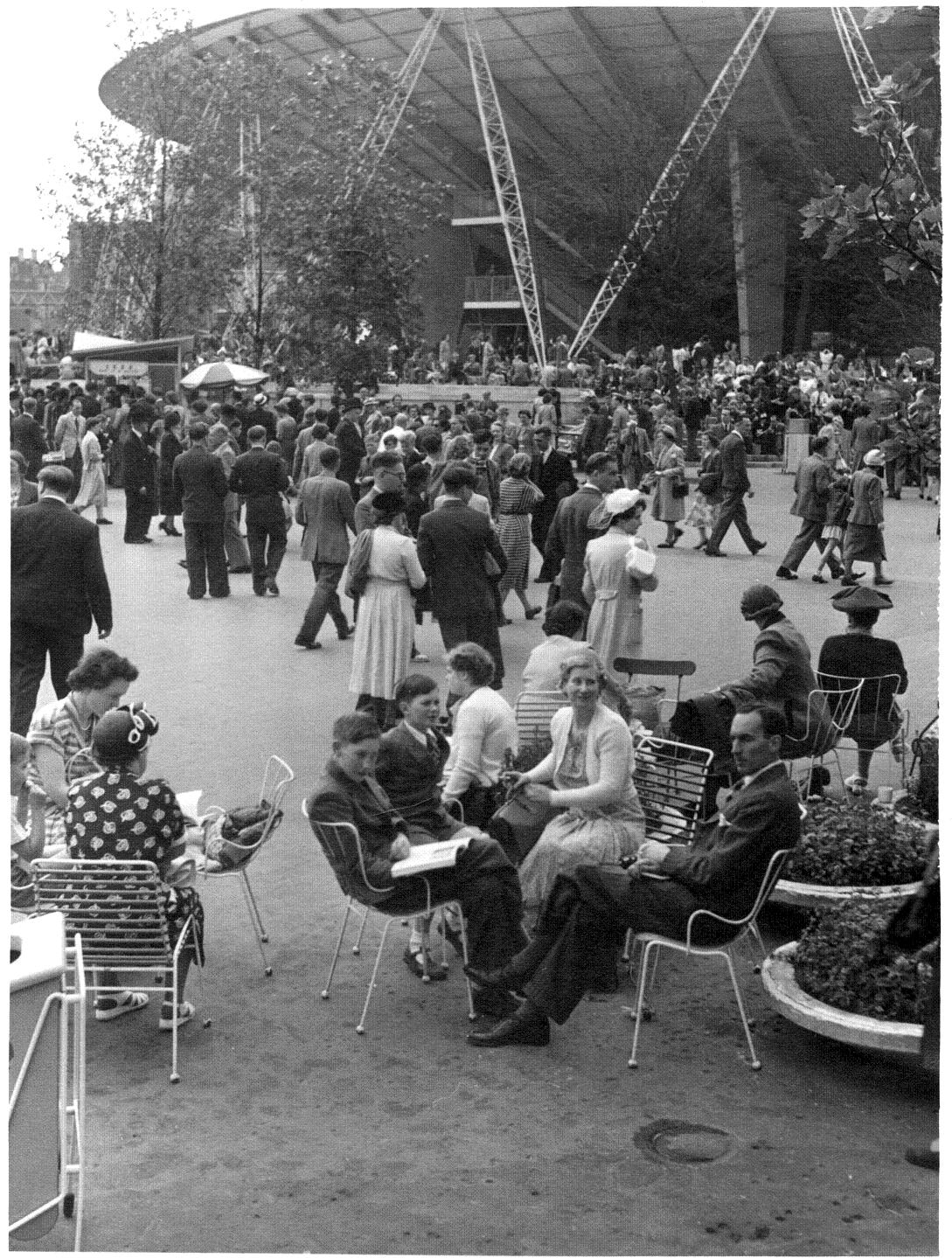
Visitors to the Festival of Britain in front of the Dome of Discovery, 1951

The history of Southbank Centre starts with the Festival of Britain, held in 1951. In what was described as "a tonic for the nation" by Herbert Morrison, the Labour Party government minister responsible for the event, the Festival of Britain aimed to demonstrate Britain's recovery from World War II by showcasing the best in science, technology, arts and industrial design. It ran from May to September 1951, and by June the following year most of it had been dismantled, following the victory of Winston Churchill and the Conservative Party in the general election of 1951. The Royal Festival Hall is the only building from the Festival of Britain that survives.

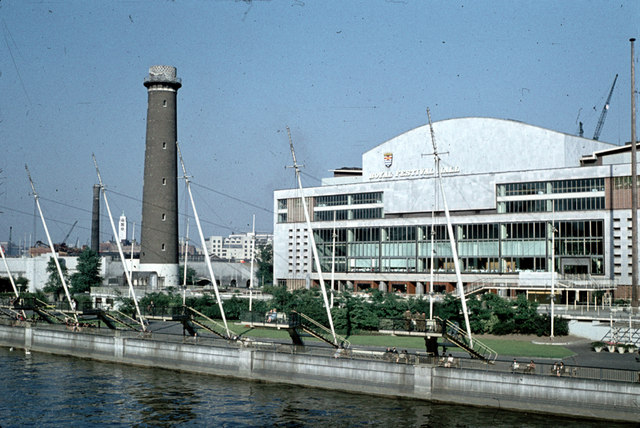
Royal Festival Hall and Shot Tower, 1959

=== 1960s ===
From 1962 to 1965, the Royal Festival Hall was extended towards the river and Waterloo station and refurbished. The London County Council (later, Greater London Council) decided in 1955 to build a second concert hall and an art gallery on the eastern part of the South Bank site previously occupied by a lead works and shot tower (and which had been earmarked as a site for the National Theatre). It was another 12 years before the Queen Elizabeth Hall and the linked Purcell Room opened to the public. Together, they were to be known as the South Bank Concert Halls. In 1968, the Hayward opened, under direct management of the Arts Council. The new buildings had their main entrances at first floor level and were integrated into an extensive elevated concrete walkway system linked to the Royal Festival Hall and the Shell Centre. This vertical separation of pedestrian and vehicle traffic proved unpopular due to the difficulty pedestrians had in navigating through the complex, and the dark and under-used spaces at ground level below the walkways.

=== 1980s ===
Following abolition of the Greater London Council in 1986, the South Bank Board was formed to take over operational control of the concert halls. The following year, the South Bank Board took over the administrative running of the Hayward from the Arts Council. Collectively, the arts venues, along with Jubilee Gardens, became the South Bank Centre, responsible to Arts Council England as an independent arts institution (after transitional arrangements).

=== 1990s ===
The walkway on the east side of the RFH, running along Belvedere Road towards the Shell Centre was removed in 1999–2000, to restore ground level circulation. The Waterloo Site (the late 1960s buildings) has been the subject of various plans for modification or reconstruction, in particular a scheme developed by Richard Rogers in the mid-1990s which would have involved a great glass roof over the existing three buildings. This did not proceed due to the high degree of National Lottery funding required and likely high cost.

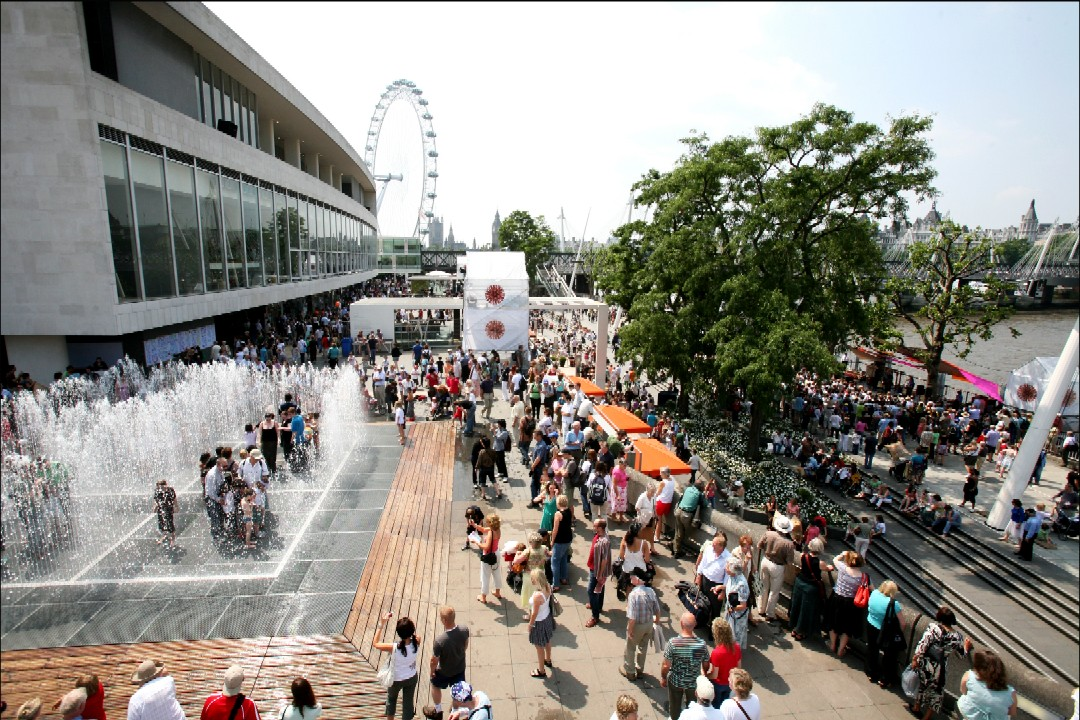
Royal Festival Hall, 2007

=== 2000s ===
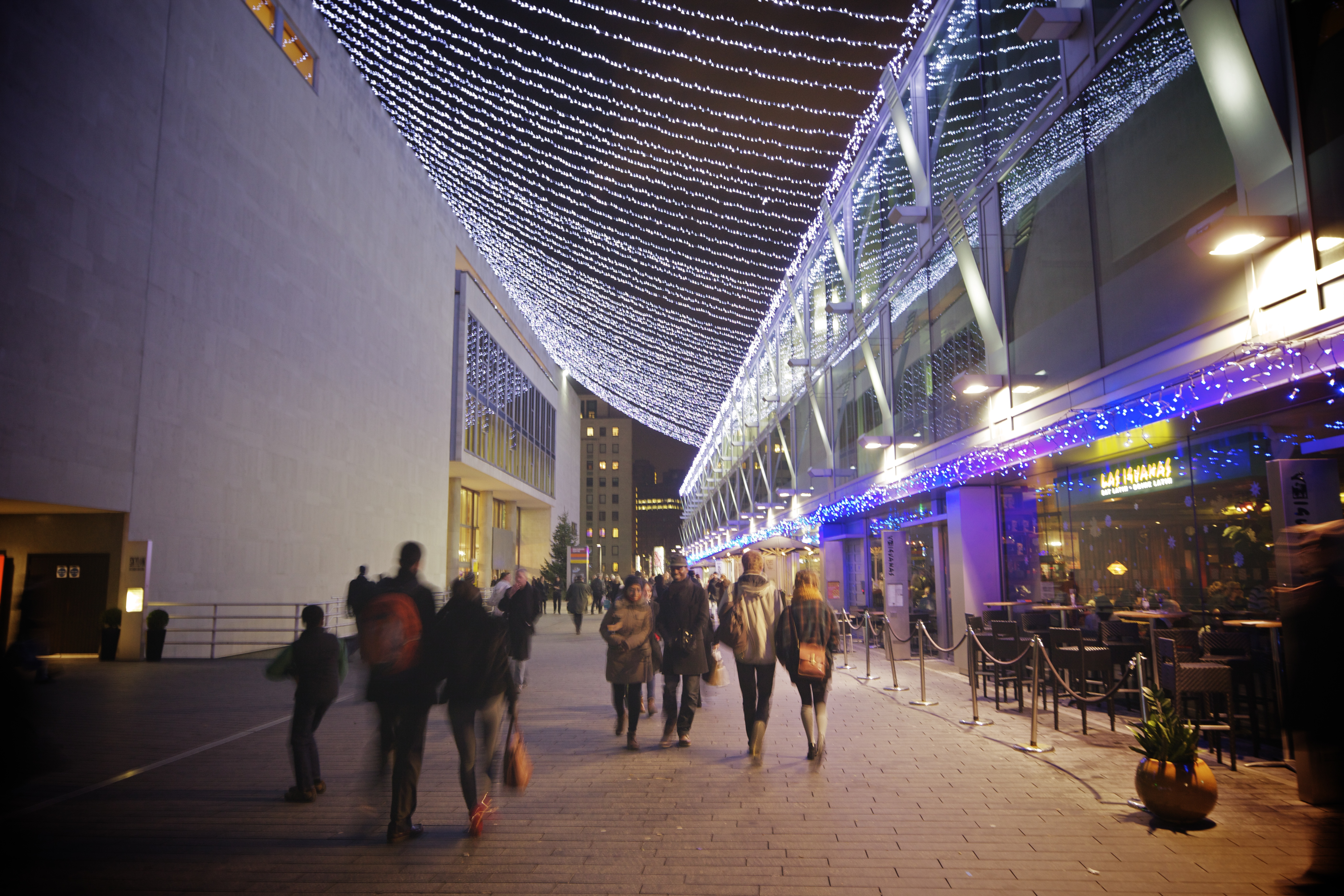
Royal Festival Hall, 2010

Audio description by Jude Kelly of the bust of Nelson Mandela at the Southbank Centre

In 2000, a masterplan for the South Bank Centre site was produced. The main features were

- a new administration building for members of staff
- the removal of access for delivery vehicles to the south of the Hungerford Bridge approach viaduct and east of the Hayward (by Waterloo Bridge);
- the creation of three new public spaces around the RFH (Festival Riverside, Southbank Centre Square and Festival Terrace);
- modification of the Queen Elizabeth Hall undercroft and the lower two levels of the Hayward to provide a frontage onto Southbank Centre Square; and
- a new British Film Institute building partly underground on the Hungerford Car Park site.

In line with the plans, in 2006-7 a new glass-fronted building was created to provide office space for Southbank Centre staff as well as a range of new shops and restaurants. This was inserted between the RFH and the approach viaduct to Hungerford Bridge. New restaurants and shops along the low level Thames elevation of the Royal Festival Hall replaced an earlier cafeteria area and accompanied pedestrianisation of this frontage, achieved by removing the circulation road. Between 2005 and 2007 the Festival Hall auditorium was modified, the natural acoustic enhanced to meet classical music requirements. Seating was also reconfigured, together with upgrades to production facilities and public areas, with provision of new bar areas, the removal of most shops from foyer spaces, and refurbished lifts and WCs.

=== 2010s ===
In early 2013 the Southbank Centre unveiled plans, which soon became a source of vigorous debate, for alterations to the Hayward Gallery and Queen Elizabeth Hall dubbed the "Festival Wing", funded by Arts Council England. The proposal would have provided arts spaces in a new high level L-shaped building linking the Hayward Gallery and Purcell Room buildings and with a wing running parallel to Waterloo Bridge behind the Queen Elizabeth Hall auditorium. Its features were to include a glass pavilion, new arts spaces, a literature centre, cafes and commercial units.

The skatepark located under the Queen Elizabeth hall

The proposed alterations would have replaced the skate park which has developed in the undercroft, hailed as the birthplace of British skateboarding, with retail units to fund the new arts spaces. By May 2014, the campaign group strongly opposing the proposals called Long Live Southbank had gained over 120,000 members. As well as the skateboarders, the National Theatre also had objections.

In early 2014, the scheme was put on hold when the Mayor of London, then Boris Johnson, said he would not support removal of the skateboarding area from the Queen Elizabeth Hall undercroft to under Hungerford Bridge. The development of the undercroft area was a key commercial and financing feature of the Festival Wing new building proposal and the scheme could not proceed in its proposed form without the commercial development or substitute funding which was not available in the amounts required.

=== 2018 refurbishment ===
Arts Council England awarded a £16m grant towards a two-year programme of repairs and conservation work on the Queen Elizabeth Hall, Purcell Room and Hayward Gallery in May 2014 and the scheme was granted planning permission in May 2015. The Southbank Centre also received funding for the conservation and limited alteration scheme, known as "Let the Light In", from the Heritage Lottery Fund and was raising funds from individuals for the final £3 million required.

This more conservation-orientated approach has also included joining with the National Trust to make the centre's 1960s buildings' contribution to the Brutalist movement better known. The buildings re-opened in 2018 following completion of the works.

=== 2020s ===
In response to the COVID-19 pandemic, which halted live performances and closed exhibitions, most of the centre's 600 employees were furloughed, and in July 2020 up to 400 were expected to be made redundant. The Hayward Gallery reopened in August but the Royal Festival Hall and Queen Elizabeth Hall were expected to remain closed until April 2021.

The complex was granted listed building status in 2026, encompassing all of its buildings and their associated walkways and public spaces including the skatepark, all of which are now Grade II listed, with the exception of the Royal Festival Hall and National Theatre, which were already Grade I and Grade II listed respectively. This followed decades of government refusal to accept the listing of the complex in its entirety. In May 2026, to mark its 75th anniversary, the centre ran a project named A Poet In Every Port in which a mobile library travelled to 11 different ports across the UK. Each stop included workshops, events and a poetry studio.

== Programming and resident orchestras ==
Six resident orchestras present full concert series across Southbank Centre's three performing spaces. London Philharmonic Orchestra, Philharmonia Orchestra, London Sinfonietta and Orchestra of the Age of Enlightenment, a roster that had gone unchanged since 1992, were joined by Aurora Orchestra and Chineke! Orchestra in 2022.

Southbank Centre is home to several high-profile annual festivals including:

- Meltdown, a music festival curated by high-profile musical figures or groups, such as David Byrne, MIA and Grace Jones. In 2026, the Southbank Centre announced Harry Styles as the Meltdown's 31st curator, for a summer that saw Styles concurrently perform a record-breaking twelve-night run at Wembley Stadium.
- Unlimited, a biennial festival multi-artform festival showcasing work by disabled artists.
- Women of the World, a festival celebrating women, girls and non-binary people founded by former Southbank Centre artistic director Jude Kelly.
- Multitudes, an annual multi-arts festival, powered by orchestral music in collaboration with the Southbank Centre's resident orchestras. The festival's debut won the Royal Philharmonic Society Award for Best Series/Event in 2026.

== Controversy ==
In June 2026, the Secretary of State for Culture, Media and Sport called on Arts Council England and the Charity Commission to investigate the centre following its chair, Misan Harriman re-posted antisemitic conspiracy theories about the 2026 attacks on Golders Green's Jewish community. Additionally, the centre also said that it would investigate Harriman internally.

The newspaper Jewish News stated that while Harriman commented on the UK's May 2026's local election results, he used a common antisemitic trope known as Holocaust inversion to describe the re-emergence of the British far-right. The racist trope draws comparisons between Nazi Germany's treatment of European Jewry to the Gaza genocide perpetrated against Palestinians.

== See also ==
- List of Brutalist structures
