= Paul Marny =

French painter (1829–1914)

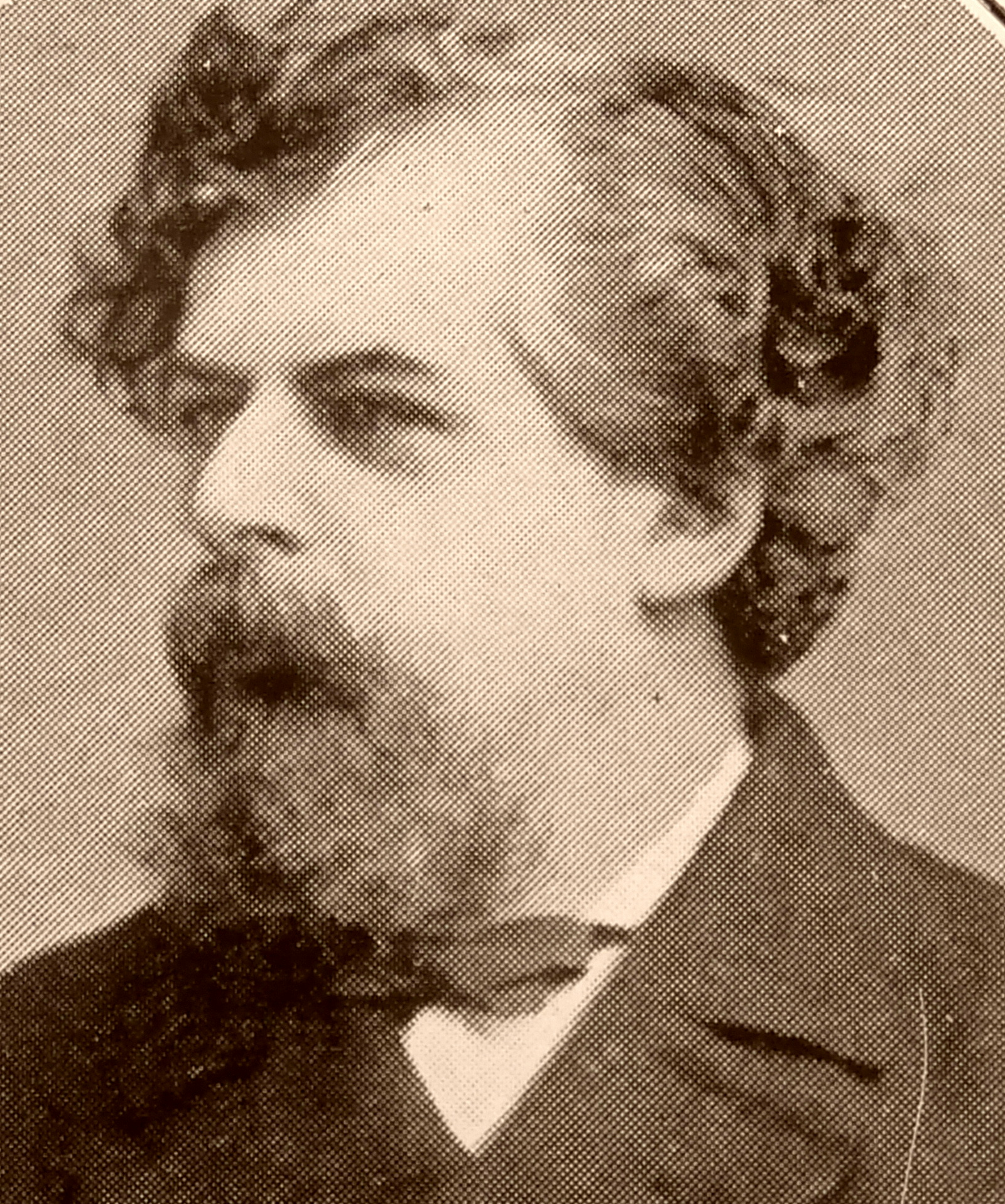
- Born: Paul François or Charles Paul Goddard; 1829; Paris, France
- Died: 1914 (aged 84–85); Scarborough, North Yorkshire, England
- Occupation: artist
- Known for: watercolour, landscapes, lithographs
- Notable work: Scarborough from White Nabb

Paul Marny (1829–1914) was a British–French artist.

== Life ==
Marny was born in Paris; his real name may have been Paul François or Charles Paul Goddard. He worked in the theatre, and as a porcelain decorator for the Sèvres factory, before moving to Belfast to work with a French architect. In 1860 he moved to Scarborough, at the suggestion of Oliver Sarony, the photographic pioneer and brother of Napoleon Sarony. There he taught Albert Strange and other Scarborough artists. William Tindall was his brother-in-law.

Marny exhibited at the Royal Academy. In 1874 the British Journal of Photography reported that

'A Gallic brother, M. Paul Marny Godard, of Paris, has obtained a patent for the application of carbon printing to porcelain or other similar substance, which, after the picture is developed, receives a coating of transparent enamel ...".

He died in Scarborough, North Yorkshire, on 24 October 1914.

== Works ==
Marny was a watercolour and landscape artist, and a lithographer. He exhibited at the Salon of 1857 in Paris. He is known for his painting The Loss of the Scarborough Lifeboat, which occurred on 2 November 1861, a subject also painted by Henry Redmore, Ernest Roe and J. N. Carte. His work is in galleries in Birkenhead, Lincoln, Scarborough and Whitby.

His painting Scarborough from White Nabb, which is in Scarborough Art Gallery, inspired Andrew Cheetham's North Bay.

== Gallery ==
'Marine View' (1930)

'Santa Maria Della Salute'

'Normandy'

'Old Paris'

'Continental study'
