= Ronzoni Hines =

English singer-songwriter (born 2006)

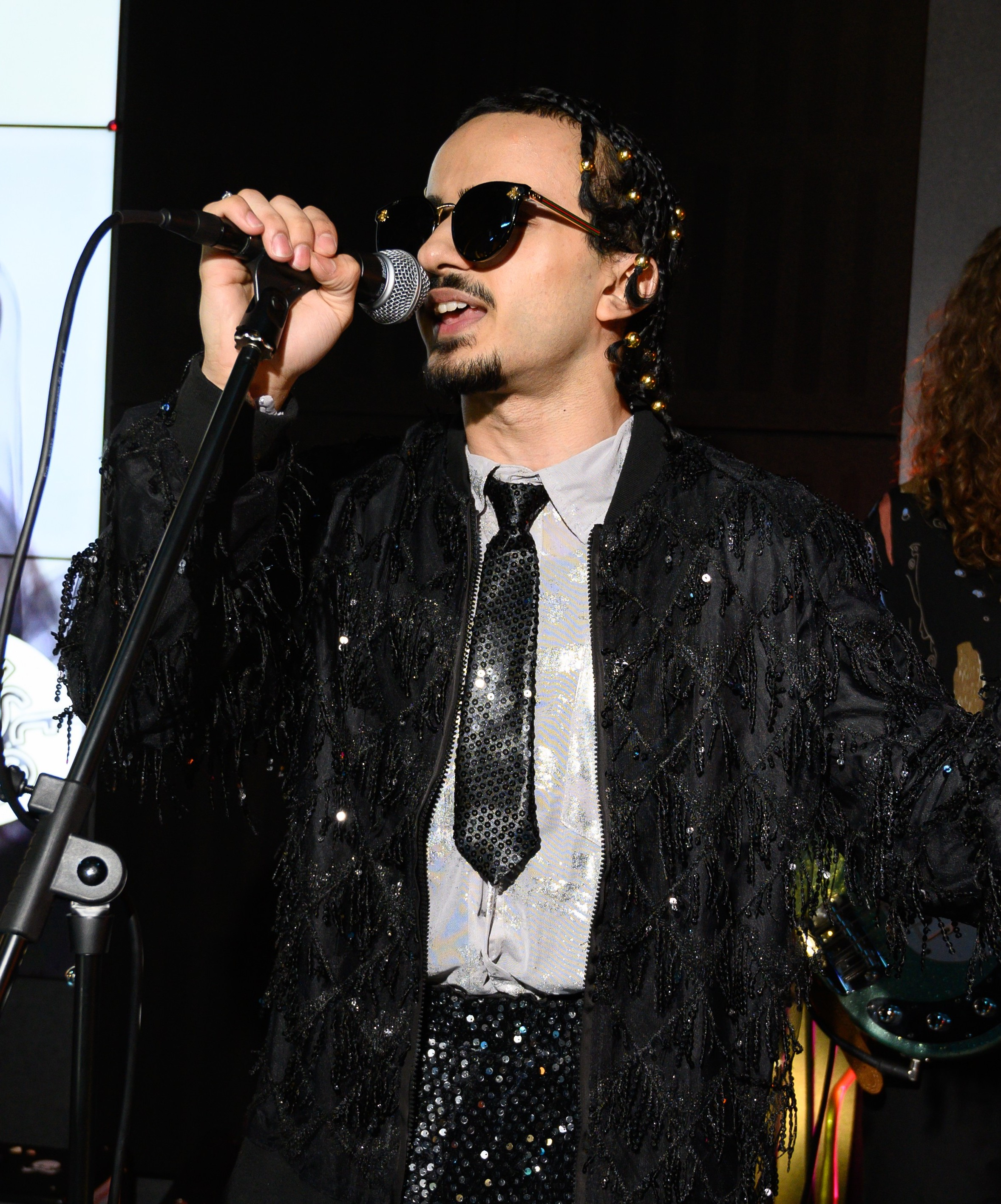
- Hines performing in 2025

Background information
- Born: Mustafa Ronzoni Hines-Kaan; 26 May 2006 (age 19); Birmingham, England
- Genres: R&B; Funk; Soul; Pop; Alt-rock
- Occupations: Singer; songwriter; record producer
- Instrument: Vocals
- Years active: 2024–present
- Labels: Mystery Records
- Website: ronzonihines.com

Ronzoni Hines (born Mustafa Ronzoni Hines-Kaan; 26 May 2006) is an English singer and songwriter. His music primarily incorporates R&B and funk, with elements of soul, pop, and alt-rock.

His work has been featured in music publications including Notion, Clash Magazine, and Earmilk. In June 2025, Entertainment Now published a feature describing him as an artist "leading a new wave of British R&B."

== Career ==
=== 2024: "Stand Up" and "Last Night" ===
Hines released his debut single, "Stand Up", in April 2024. He received wider media attention with his second single, "Last Night", released in June 2024. The music publication Earmilk provided a dedicated feature, calling the track a "soulful R&B anthem" and praising his "dynamic vocal range and undeniable charisma." The review stated that Hines "delivers a performance that is both vulnerable and powerful, his buttery smooth yet powerful vocals gliding effortlessly over a lush, atmospheric production." The blog I'm Not From London described the song as "a masterclass in modern R&B, a track that washes over you with gorgeous layers of sound and that feeling of effortless cool".

=== 2024–2025: "Trance" and "That's Her" ===
Hines released his third single, "Trance", in November 2024. Clash Magazine featured the release, describing it as a "dextrous fusion of rock and R&B, with his soulful voice soaring over distorted guitars and a driving beat." The publication noted that his "willingness to blur the lines between genres is what makes him stand out." The Big Takeover also reviewed the track, noting its blend of "hypnotic R&B with a rock-infused edge."

In June 2025, he released the single "That's Her", which was premiered by Notion. The magazine offered a detailed review:

The 19-year-old UK prodigy delivers a sleek, funk-infused anthem that radiates charisma, craftsmanship, and ambition. [...] With a smooth-as-silk vocal performance that glides over a bed of groovy basslines, shimmering guitars, and tight, infectious rhythms, Ronzoni has crafted a track that feels both timeless and distinctly modern. It's a confident stride forward from an artist who is not just finding his voice, but mastering it.

== Artistry ==
Hines's musical style is noted for its synthesis of genres. His vocal delivery is a frequent point of praise from critics, with Earmilk describing his voice as "buttery smooth yet powerful," and Notion commending his "smooth-as-silk vocal performance". As a songwriter, Hines's lyrics often explore themes of self-worth and romance. Notion described "That's Her" as a "funk-fuelled ode to confidence, charm, and self-worth". His growing presence as a live performer has also been noted as a key part of his artistic development.

== Personal life ==
Hines is the older brother of musician and producer Davi The Mavi. Davi has stated in an interview that his own musical beginnings involved experimenting with and remixing his older brother's early demos.

== Discography ==
Singles

- "Stand Up" (2024)
- "Last Night" (2024)
- "Trance" (2024)
- "That's Her" (2025)
