= Foji Gill =

Punjabi singer, writer and producer

- Born: Manjit Singh Gill Coventry, United Kingdom
- Genres: Punjabi; Bhangra
- Occupations: Singer-songwriter record producer
- Years active: 2009–present

Manjit Singh "Foji" Gill (Punjabi: ਫ਼ੋਜੀ) is a Birmingham-based Punjabi singer, writer and producer. First rising to fame in 2010 with hits such as "Dafa Hoja" and "Bruah", Foji has continued with a number of successful releases and has featured in the top 3 of the Official Asian Download Chart for longer than any other bhangra artist (12 weeks). Gill was sentenced to five years imprisonment for committing offences related to money laundering in April 2015 until January 2019.

== Early life ==
Brought up in Birmingham, Foji started singing at the age of eight. During a trip to India aged thirteen he learnt to read and write Punjabi and was exposed to the work of a number of Punjabi artists. Influences listed including classic Punjabi singers Lal Chand Yamla Jatt, Surinder Kaur, Amar Singh Chamkila, Didar Sandhu, K Deep and Jagmohan Kaur, as well as a sequence of more recent artists such as Kuldip Manak, Jagjit Singh, Satinder Sartaaj, Ustaad Rahat Fateh Ali Khan and Gurdas Mann (who Foji also interviewed in September 2010 on behalf of radio station Raaj FM). One of Foji's first songs was a humorous reworking of Golden Stars 'Lumbra De Vere Vich', whilst studying at Solihull College.

In the same year, Foji joined popular Bhangra dance group Nachda Sansaar as a freestyle and traditional Bhangra dancer, subsequently progressing to front vocalist. He performed with the group for 10 years, with appearances including the Eurovision Song Contest 1998, the 24th G8 summit, and BBC's The Generation Game and Goodness Gracious Me (BBC).,

Foji further honed his vocal range and skills further under the guidance of Indian classical musician and vocalist Soni Atwal and has also trained with Punjabi ghazal singer and music director Surinder Khan to develop his vocal range and harmonium skills to develop a deeper understanding of Indian classical music.

== Career ==
After releasing his first single, Bondhlgai in late 2009, Foji's second single, Dafa Hoja with top selling Punjabi female vocalist Miss Pooja, released in February 2010 and became one of the most successful singles in the Official Asian Download Chart, with both tracks featuring in the inaugural chart. Dafa Hoja enjoyed an unbroken and unprecedented 16-week spell in the top 10, and with Rahat Fateh Ali Khan's ‘Sajda’ dropping out of the top 40 on 11 September, Dafa Hoja became the last single to remain in the chart since featuring in the first official countdown in March.

On 24 July 2010, Foji's third single Bruah became the first original Bhangra single by a solo artist to top the Official Asian Download Chart. His fourth release, a tribute to the Punjabi freedom fighter Bhagat Singh, was released in August 2010. Despite featuring within the iTunes top 100 downloads within the World music category at one point, and receiving critical acclaim in The Times of India, the track which may be seen as containing some politically sensitive lyrics was not featured in the Official Asian Download Chart on BBC radio.

Foji's debut album, Dafa Hoja, was released on 30 September 2010.

Foji finished the year with a Christmas release, Peja's Kristmus. Recognisable by his trademark royal blue tracksuit and white turban, the comedy character Peja appeared in the animated video for the song, as well as in the Foji's Dafa Hoja, Bruah, and later Pumbeeri videos. A short humorous take on Jingle Bells, reaching number 14 in the chart following Christmas week made Peja's Kristmus the joint highest ever re-entry into the chart, until Jaswinder Daghamia's Teri Toor re-entered at number 9 in April 2011.

After the retro Punjabi ‘akaara’ style video for Dafa Hoja, then a spoof of the common Punjabi house party videos for Bruah (replacing partygoers, frolics and alcohol with children, mischief and milk), and the historic epic depicted in Shaheed Bhagat Singh, Foji maintained his penchant for original music videos with his February 2011 release, Pumbeeri. The video consists of a Flash Mob-style dance routine performed amongst unsuspecting shoppers at the Bull Ring, Birmingham on a busy Saturday afternoon.

The track gave Foji another Asian Download Chart number one, joining only the Billboard Hot 100 topping MOBO Awards nominee Jay Sean, and music producer Punjabi By Nature, in having three top 2 hits on the chart.

After his release from prison, foji made a comeback with his single Sher Di Poosh.
