= Paul Braddon =

English artist (1864–1937)

Paul Braddon (1864–1937) was an English artist who predominantly painted landscape scenes in the watercolour medium. He was influenced by the work of Paul Marny.

== Life and work ==
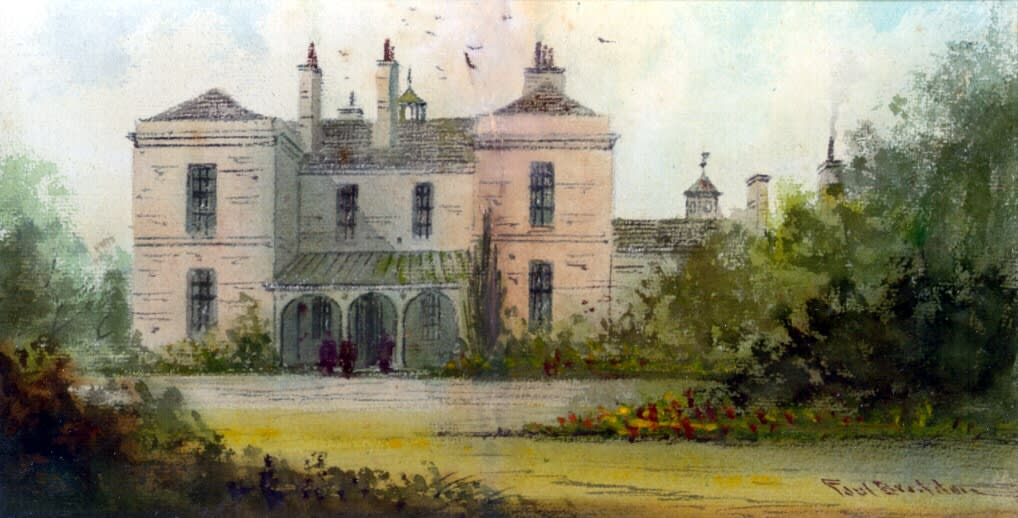
Braddon's undated painting of Heathfield Hall, Handsworth, the former home of inventor James Watt

Paul Braddon was the pseudonym of James Leslie Crees. He was born at 46, Ledsam Street in Birmingham on 10 July 1864. In his early years he created architectural drawings of continental cathedrals and churches. Later he abandoned this style in favour of the watercolours for which he is best known. He made pencil sketches of buildings and scenes, carefully annotated, from which he produced the eventual watercolours.

Braddon was a prolific painter whose works were widely appreciated for their detail and atmospheric quality. Educated in Europe, Braddon developed a keen interest in art at an early age and honed his skills in various European art academies. Traveling extensively, he captured the essence of the European countryside, urban scenes, and coastal views in his art. His works often reflected a romantic and sometimes idealized vision of the landscape, which was common among artists of his time.

Braddon's paintings were exhibited in numerous exhibitions, including the prestigious Royal Academy in London. Despite the popularity of his work during his lifetime, Paul Braddon contributions to the art of watercolor painting and his documentation of landscapes and cityscapes of the late 19th and early 20th centuries remain valued by collectors and historians.

His output was prolific, as it needed to be in order for him to earn a living. For several years he painted exclusively for a London firm which sold many of his pictures in the United States. He died aged 73 on 24 July 1937 in Thornton Heath, Croydon, Surrey, and was buried on 24 July 1937 in Addington, Surrey..

Paul Braddon's work has been offered at auction multiple times, with realized prices ranging from 16 USD to 900 USD, depending on the size and medium of the artwork. Since 2001 the record price for this artist at auction is 900 USD for Rouen Cathedral West Front, sold at Leland Little Auction & Estate Sales in 2012.

== Exhibitions and collections ==
Paul Braddon's work can be found in a number of museums and art galleries worldwide including Birmingham Museum and Art Gallery, Shrewsbury Museum, Yale Museum in Hartford USA; The Metropolitan Museum in New York City USA; Dunedin Public Art Gallery in New Zealand; the Victoria and Albert Museum in London UK; Edinburgh Museum and Art Gallery, The Samuel Johnson Birthplace Museum, Inverclyde Museum, Bronte Museum, municipal collections include Somerset County Council, and Blackburn Grammar School.
