= Una White =

Jamaican-British nurse

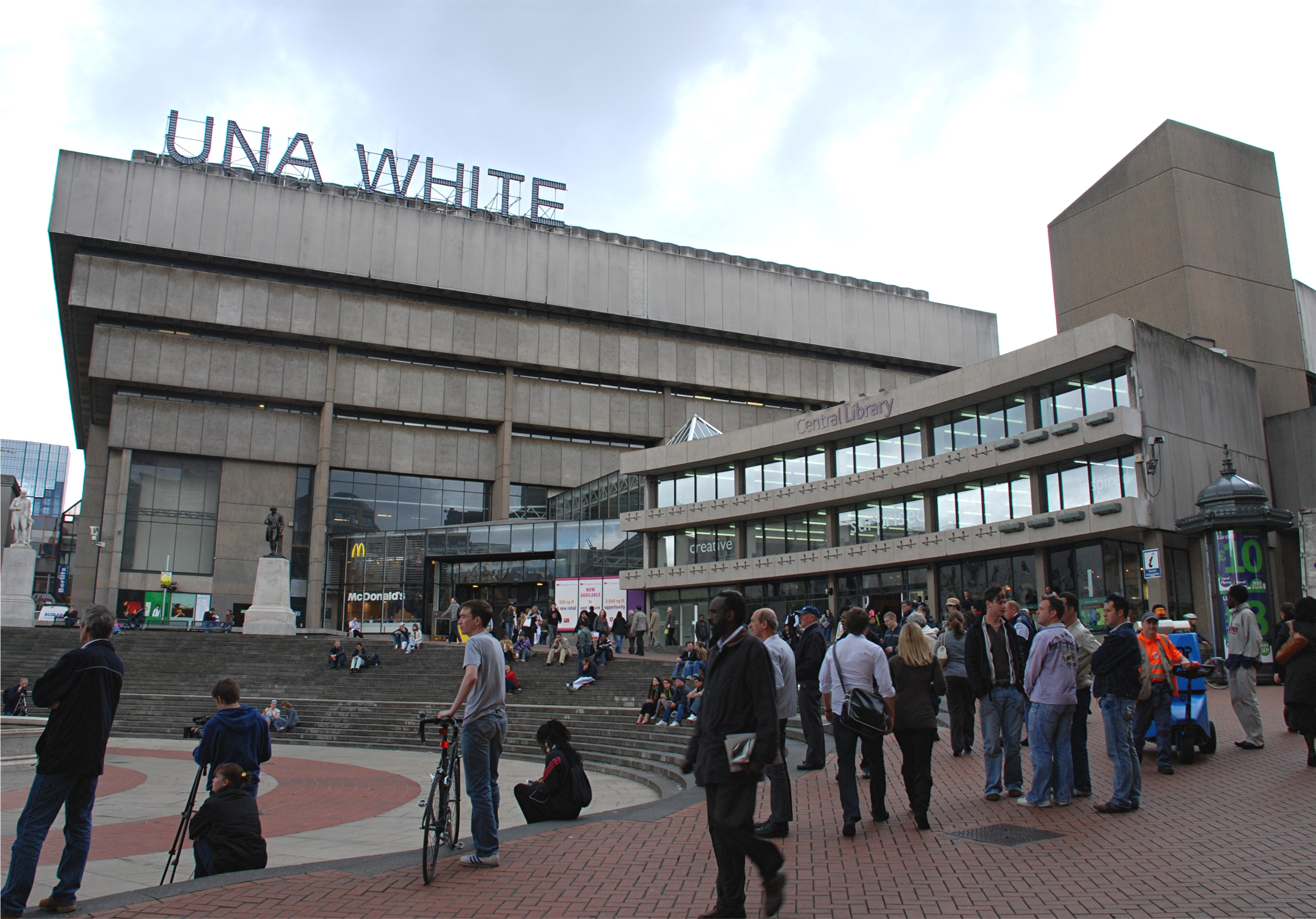
- The artwork in situ
- Died: April 1997 (aged 58)
- Monuments: Illuminated lettering on Birmingham Central Library, 2007
- Occupations: Hairdresser; Nurse
- Known for: Ordinariness

Una White (died April 1997) was a Jamaican-British nurse who achieved posthumous notability when her name was placed, in 12 feet (3.7 m) high illuminated lettering, on Birmingham Central Library (since demolished) for three weeks, as an art installation by Joshua Sofaer part of the city's Fierce! festival. The sign was illuminated from 17 May to 3 June 2007.

Her name was suggested for use in the artwork by her daughter Carol, after a public appeal for people to nominate a friend or family member who deserved to have their name in lights. Una was selected from a number of entries, by a panel comprising advertising mogul Trevor Beattie, broadcaster Mark Lawson, celebrity agent Jonathan Shalit, fashion designer Jemima French, and This Morning presenter Alison Hammond.

Sofaer said the project was "aimed at encouraging people to think about the meaning of celebrity", and that:

I wanted people to think about who they want as their role models. There might be unknown ones which are better than Posh Spice.

Formerly a hairdresser, White moved to the United Kingdom from Jamaica in the 1960s and trained as a nurse before working at St Margaret's (Mental) Hospital in Walsall.
