= Ernie Newman =

English footballer

Personal information
- Full name: Ernest Henry Newman
- Date of birth: 27 December 1887
- Place of birth: Birmingham, England
- Position: Inside forward

Senior career*
Years	Team	Apps	(Gls)
- Walsall
1909	Stockport County	19	(5)
1909–1913	Tottenham Hotspur	30	(7)
- * Club domestic league appearances and goals

Ernest Henry Newman (27 December 1887–?) was an English professional footballer who played for Walsall, Stockport County and Tottenham Hotspur.

== Football career ==
Newman began his football career at Walsall. In 1909 he joined Stockport County where he featured in 19 matches and scored five goals. The inside forward went on to play for Tottenham Hotspur. Between 1909 and 1913 Newman made 32 appearances and scored seven goals in all competitions for the White Hart Lane club before ending his playing career.
