= Mark Ball (artistic director) =

British artistic director

- Occupation: Artistic Director of the Southbank Centre

Mark Ball is Artistic Director based at London's Southbank Centre. He took up the position in January 2022. Ball grew up in Bury, Greater Manchester and studied politics at John Moores University in Liverpool. He was previously the Creative Director at Manchester International Festival and Artistic Director and Chief Executive of the London International Festival of Theatre and has worked for prison theatre company, Geese Theatre.
