= Peter Mucklow =

English cricketer

Personal information
- Full name: Peter Mucklow
- Born: 19 November 1949 (age 76); Edgbaston, Warwickshire, England
- Batting: Right-handed
- Role: Wicket-keeper

Domestic team information
- Years: Team
- 1968–1969: Shropshire
- 1970: Oxford University

Career statistics
Competition	First-class
Matches	2
Runs scored	48
Batting average	12.00
100s/50s	–/–
Top score	32
Catches/stumpings	1/–
- Source: Cricinfo, 10 July 2019

Peter Mucklow (born 5 November 1949) is an English former first-class cricketer.

Mucklow was born at Edgbaston in November 1949 and educated at Shrewsbury School. While studying at Trinity College at the University of Oxford, he made two appearances in first-class cricket for Oxford University against Surrey and Middlesex in 1970. He scored 48 runs in these two matches, with a high score of 32. In addition to playing first-class cricket, Mucklow also played minor counties cricket for Shropshire from 1968 and 1969, making ten appearances in the Minor Counties Championship, while playing at club level for Bridgnorth.
