= Killing of Louise Jensen =

1994 killing in Ayia Napa, Cyprus

The killing of Louise Jensen happened on 16 September 1994 in Ayia Napa, Cyprus, when British soldiers Allan Ford, Justin Fowler, and Geoffrey Pernell attacked, abducted, raped, and killed Danish tour guide Louise Jensen.

== The victim ==
Louise Jensen was born on 19 March 1971. She grew up in the town of Hirtshals, Denmark, together with her parents and her younger brother. After college, Jensen was working as a tour guide in Cyprus.

== Killing ==
On the night of 16 September 1994, Jensen and her Cypriot boyfriend, Michalis Vassiliades, were riding a motorbike when they were hit by a vehicle driven by the drunk soldiers Allan Ford, Justin Fowler, and Geoffrey Pernell, serving with the Royal Green Jackets. Having beaten Jensen's boyfriend to the ground, Pernell forced Jensen into the vehicle, and the soldiers abducted her. She was then repeatedly raped and repeatedly beaten with a spade, leading to her death.

== Trial and sentence ==
On 27 March 1996, Ford, Fowler, and Pernell were convicted of abduction, rape, and murder and sentenced to life imprisonment.

The judges described the crime as "inhumane when planned, and vulgar when exercised". In court the soldiers' only explanation was that they "wanted a woman".

On 16 April 1996, Jensen's parents received a written apology from the British Ministry of Defence on behalf of Prime Minister John Major.

In 1998, a higher court cut their sentences to 25 years. All three men were originally sentenced to life for murder, but that was reduced to 25 years for manslaughter on appeal, on the grounds that they were judged too drunk to have planned the attack.

In 2006, after spending under twelve years in custody, the soldiers were released and deported to Britain.

Following the murder, British military declared main tourist resorts on the island as out of bounds to military personnel.
