= Godfried Donkor =

UK-based Ghanaian artist

Godfried Donkor (born 1964) is a Ghanaian artist, living and working in London, who has exhibited in Cuba, Mexico, the US, Europe and Africa. He is known primarily for his work in collage, and has been described as similar to Keith Piper and Isaac Julien in his output. Some of his pieces depict boxers, such as Jack Johnson and Mohammad Ali. Donkor has been the subject of numerous solo exhibitions, both in the United States and in Europe, and was Ghana's representative to the 2001 Venice Biennale. His work is in the collection of the National Museum of African Art at the Smithsonian Institution.

== Introduction ==
Godfried Donkor was born in Ghana in 1964, then moved to London, England, in 1973 when he was eight years old. Although known for his painting and collage work, Donkor's original intention as an artist, from the age of 14, was to be a fashion designer. It was only at the urging of his teachers to try a different medium that he purchased some paint and brushes and began painting. Soon afterwards, he switched his entire focus to painting and was from thereon out a visual artist, but still with a fondness for fashion design, and sought a way to bridge the two throughout his career. After finding his new medium, Donkor began to study art and art history at Saint Martin's College of Art. After receiving his BA in Fine Art, he went on to attend postgraduate courses in the Fine Arts at Escola Massana in Barcelona, Spain, before completing an MA in African Art History from the School of Oriental and African Studies at the University of London, in 1995. Using a variety of methods, Donkor works in mixed-media creating painting, collage, and printmaking as well as video, photography and print works. Donkor's work inspiration comes from the historical and sociological issues shared in the history of the African and European people.

=== Influence and style ===
Taking inspiration from the people of Africa and Europe, Donkor's influences encompass topics in relation to historical events and social issues. Social issues, the commercialization of the human and the rise of the African American, are the most common themes used in his art. Working mostly in collage, he uses mixed-media, including as newspapers, lace, sheet music and other paper materials as a background to majority of his pieces. On top of the background, Donkor layers illustrations and photographic images that often juxtapose one another. The main images in his work usually represent a rise and empowerment of the African-American community, showing a breakthrough of success after a troubling and difficult history. Donkor's interest in collage began when he was a student at St. Martin's College of Art in London, where he instantly connected with the medium. His original intention with collages was as a preparation for his other works and paintings; however, others saw them as works of art in themselves and encouraged himor to continue experimenting. Of his inclination towards collaging, Donkor says: "Visual language is intriguing to me and with collage, symbols become a language… thus it was interesting to me that a language was developing from the images. Collage can be a very expressive medium, very instant and direct, [but] I think I’m drawn to using images that may seem to be contrasting in a harmonious way."

Donkor also works with fabrics and clothing design, separating him from his other types of works. Since the age of 14, he wanted to pursue fashion and was able to bring his love of fashion out through his work. He shows off his fashion design and use of fabric in series such as the Jamestown Masquerade. Many of his pieces showcase an outfit on a mannequin with no head, showing off the art in the fabric and fashion he has created. Donkor also was approached by Puma to design the Football Kits for the Ghana National Football Team in 2012, allowing him to create a design and theme behind his birth nation's team.

== Career ==
=== Collage series ===
Donkor describes artists as hoarders, always collecting text and images to be used in later works. His creative process often begins with someone sending him a series of images or text. He often assembles text and images from 1800s literature as a starting point. Donkor plans his layout with these images before beginning the drawing process, as an outline to each collage. He is known for creating juxtapositions between the modern world and the past, comparing Africa, Europe, and the Caribbean.

In his series of collages entitled Slave to Champ and Madonnas, Donkor uses images of African Americans in recent history, such as boxers, football players or a pin-up girls, to show the rise of the African American from slavery to success. The variety of characters as well as the rise from the centre of the ship shows that the black ladder to success is not a natural one, but an artificial rise that conforms to a society catered towards white people. Muhammad Ali stands over the illustrated slave ship like a mythic giant, though his stance and facial expression are timid and nonaggressive. Donkor frequently selects images of heroic black figures in these positions as a way to tear down the brutish stereotype of black men and play with notions of black masculinity. These images also suggest that their success, specifically the black sports figures, is rooted in their commodification as entertainment for a white audience.

Donkor also has many other collage series such as: The Art of Football, Guns and Bullets and Financial Times Flags 2004–2008. The Guns and Bullets collection and the Financial Times Flags show a different message, using objects rather than people in his images. The Financial Flags show stock market figures as the background to different nations’ flags, including Saudi Arabia, Israel, Iraq and many others. The Guns and Bullets series have similar backgrounds with market and financial statements with images of guns and ammunition pasted as the focal point.

=== Paintings ===
Along with collage, Donkor also has painting series, oil sketches and print series. Keeping with a similar theme of a central character, in the form of an athlete or leader, his paintings are done with oil on canvas, with the addition of a gold-leaf halo around the central figure or figures’ heads. This insertion alludes to Donkor's own relationship to Christianity and recalls early Renaissance commissions for the church. The halo represents a divine and holy figure, showing the African American figure as a higher power similar to a saint. This shows the figures as role models for success and that success is possible no matter where you come from.

This technique can be seen in his painting St. Tom Molineaux, which features the famed bare-knuckle boxer. Tom Molineaux’s image is entirely appropriated from English portrait painter Robert Dighton’s portrait of him in Donkor’s own style of painting. The fairly modest portrait would be indistinguishable to Donkor’s body of work without his insertion of the gold-leaf halo around Molineaux’s head, elevating him to the saint status provided in the work’s title.

=== Lace series ===
Another material used for Donkor's work has been the incorporation of lace. After living in Nottingham, Donkor created a series called “Once Upon a Time in the West, There Was Lace” for Art Exchange and Nottingham Contemporary. Donkor chose lace, which is a symbol of Nottinghams heritage, as a tribute to Nottingham. To continue the integration of lace in his work, Donkor most recently used lace for the EVA International Ireland's Biennial of Contemporary Art in 2016. Donkor used the Rebel Madonna Lace design which has been made from a series of drawings by the artist, inspired by traditional Limerick lace patterns and by images from Donkor's own vision and influence from Ghanaian culture. Building on the shared history of lace production in Ireland and Ghana, Donkor had the lace piece for the exhibition commercially produced in Ghana and hand made in Limerick, Ireland. By incorporating both nations into the production process, Donkor connects their similar lace histories in terms of how the material was being exploited by greater colonial powers. The Rebel Madonna Lace exhibit is made up of a bright orange lace jumpsuit, embroidered with a number on the left side, and a straitjacket. The outfits evoke "a penitentiary’s finest", creating "a striking visual representation of commercial enslavement as colonial legacy". Similar to Donkor's previous works bringing attention to the commodification of the human being, the exhibition boldly critiques “empire and exploitation” in the face of Ireland's colonial legacy. This exhibition is also a call to the craving of lace in West-Africa, more specifically in Ghana, where it is a highly luxurious and expensive material.

=== Jamestown Masquerade ===
Donkor's print series Jamestown Masquerade, done in collaboration with designer Allan Davids, shows images of black models in ornately patterned and vibrantly colored clothing, wearing masquerade masks. This series differs the most from the majority of his works, adding live images and vibrant color to his collections as well as working with textiles as a medium. The photograph series combines Donkor's interest in fashion with his painting and design background. The inspiration behind this series came from Donkor's fascination with the classical era, and imagining how classical music could be transformed to a place like Ghana, Trinidad, or Jamaica. The outfits, which Donkor describes more as "sculptural pieces", were based on 18th-century costumes to further evoke the musical era, and capture his fascination with the weighty past of Africans and their historical presence. This work is Donkor's modernist example of drawing two unique histories together: those of Europe and Africa.

=== 2010–Present ===
In 2012, Donkor designed the football kit for the Ghanaian national football team. He was sought out by Puma after showcasing some work at an exhibit during the 2010 World Cup in South Africa. Donkor wanted a theme or title for the kit so that it would stand out as another one of his artworks. Donkor researched past Ghana kits ranging from the 1950s to the Youth team. He came up with the theme for the kits "Raining Black Stars", representing the team raining down on the opponent in unison and used the nation's colors of red, gold and green. Some other themes behind the kit were inspired by how the team he analysed the teams play, "they are fearless of any opponent, they move in unison in attack and defence so the idea soon developed of a constellation of Black Stars falling down the kit".

Donkor continues to work with textiles in addition to his painting and collage work, which can be seen as recently as the 2016 EVA International Biennial in Ireland.

== Exhibitions ==
=== Solo exhibitions ===
- People of Utopia (2011), ARTCO Gallery Herzogenrath, Germany
- The Five Court (2010), Fred, London
- The Olympians and Muses (2009), Afronova Gallery, Johannesburg, South Africa
- Story of a London Township (2009)
- London; Financial Times (2007)
- Gorée Festival, Gorée Island, Senegal
- The Sable Venus and the Black Madonna (2006), Gallerie 23, Amsterdam, Holland
- Concerto in Light and Darkness no 1 (2005), National Museum, Ghana (EVA International)

=== Group shows ===
- STREAMLINES (2015), Deichtorhallen, Hamburg
- How Far How Near (2014), Stedelijk Museum, Amsterdam
- Speaking of People: Ebony, Jet and Contemporary Art (2014), Studio Museum, Harlem, New York
- GOLD (2012), Museum Belvedere, Vienna, Austria
- Moving into Space: Football and Art in West Africa (2012), National Museum of Football, Manchester; Hollandaise (2012), Stedelijk Museum Bureau Amsterdam
- Space and Currencies (2010), Museum of Africa, Johannesburg, South Africa

== Awards ==
Awards Donkor has received include in 1998 the Prix de la Revelation, at the Dakar Biennale.
