= Brian Griffiths (artist) =

British artist

Brian Griffiths RA (born 1968) is a British artist based in London. He produces three-dimensional collages using a range of sources, including old textbooks, 1950s and 1960s furniture, remnants of cut linoleum and polystyrene. His most well known works are his full-size cardboard reconstructions of computer workstations.

Griffiths was born in Stratford-Upon-Avon, UK. He received his BA from the University of Humberside in 1992. From 1995 to 1996 he studied for his M.A. in Fine Art at Goldsmiths College, University of London.

Griffiths has shown work internationally in many exhibitions including New Blood at the Saatchi Gallery in London, the 2001 Tirana Biennale, Haemorrhaging States at Tent in Rotterdam and Hey, You Never Know at Kenny Schachter in New York City. He participated in the 2001 Beck's Futures prize and was a selector for the 2006 Bloomberg New Contemporaries.

Grittiths is also a tutor at the Royal Academy Schools and a part-time tutor at Camberwell College of Arts for BA sculpture.
